= List of Bulgarian films of the 1980s =

A list of the most notable films produced in Bulgaria during the 1980s grouped by year of release. For an alphabetical list of articles on Bulgarian films see Category:Bulgarian films.

== List ==
=== 1980 ===
Title	Title (Latin) English	Director	Length	Cast	Notes
1980
Баш Майсторът на Екскурзия	Bash Maystorat na Ekskurziya; Past-Master on the Excursion	Petar B. Vasilev		Kiril Gospodinov, Todor Todorov, Nataliya Zubareva, Svetla Stoeva, Nikolay Atanasov, Petar Gogov and Yuriy Yakovlev	Color; Mono; Comedy
Въздушният човек	Vazdushniyat chovek The Airman	Kiran Kolarov		Dimitar Buynozov, Petar Despotov, Maria Kavardjikova, Grigor Vachkov, Nikola Todev, Itzhak Fintzi, Vasil Popiliev, Boris Lukanov, Aneta Sotirova, Tzvetana Maneva, Veselin Vulkov and Boncho Urumov	Color; Mono; Drama
Голямото нощно къпане	Golyamoto noshtno kapane The Big Night Bathe	Binka Zhelyazkova	144min	Yanina Kasheva, Małgorzata Braunek, Tanya Shahova, Lyuben Chatalov, Ilia Karaivanov, Nikolai Sotirov, Juozas Budraitis, Ivan Kondov, Ventzislav Bozhinov, Krasimir Mashev and Nelli Topalova	Color; Mono; Drama
Дами канят	Dami kanyat Ladies Choice	Ivan Andonov	95min	Stefan Danailov, Tzvetana Maneva, Mariana Dimitrova, Nevena Kokanova, Boryana Puncheva, Maria Statoulova, Dorotea Toncheva, Ilka Zafirova, Georgi Rusev, Nadya Todorova, Yordanka Kuzmanova and Nikola Todev	Color; Mono; Comedy
Двойникът	Dvoynikat; The Double	Nikolai Volev	98min	Todor Kolev, Yordanka Kuzmanova, Georgi Rusev, Nadya Todorova, Pavel Popandov, Radosveta Vassileva, Lyuben Kalinov, Aneta Sotirova, Ivan Yanchev and Georgi Mamalev	Color; Mono; Comedy
Игра на любов	Igra na lyubov Love Game	Yanush Vazov	95min	Lyuben Chatalov, Yordanka Lyubenova, Bistra Marcheva, Rashko Mladenov, Rumyana Gaytandzhieva, Madlen Cholakova and Lyubomir Dekovski	Color; Drama
Илюзия	Ilyuzia; Illusion	Ludmil Staikov	112min	Lyuben Chatalov, Rusi Chanev, Susana Kotzurikova, Petar Slabakov, Velko Kynev, Georgi Rusev, Nikola Todev, Kirill Kavadarkov and Nadya Todorova	Color (Eastmancolor); Mono; Drama; Fantasy
Камионът	Kamionat; The Truck	Christo Christov	108min	Grigor Vachkov, Lilyana Kovacheva, Veselin Vulkov, Stefan Dimitrov and Djoko Rosic	Entered into the 31st Berlin International Film Festival
Почти любовна история	Pochti lyubovna istoriya Almost a Love Story	Eduard Zahariev	86 min	Mariana Dimitrova, Grigor Vachkov, Yavor Spasov, Elena Kuneva, Nina Arnaudova, Veselin Vulkov and Panayot Kasabov	Color; Mono; Drama
Нощните бдения на Поп Вечерко	Noshtnite bdeniya na pop Vecherko; Priest Vecherko's Night Wakefulness	Dimitar Petrov		Konstantin Kotsev, Georgi Kaloyanchev, Dimitar Panov, Pavel Popandov, Tzvetana Maneva, Anya Pencheva and Ivan Ivanov	Color; Silent; Comedy

=== 1981 ===
1981
Адаптация	Adaptatsiya; Adaptation	Vulo Radev	165min	Eli Skorcheva, Antony Genov, Ivan Grigorov, Nikolai Sotirov, Lyuben Chatalov, Elena Kuneva, Neli Valkanova, Anya Pencheva and Ilia Karaivanov	Color; Mono; Drama
Баш майсторът фермер	Bash maystorat fermer The Past-Master Farmer	Petar B. Vasilev	75min	Kiril Gospodinov, Silviya Avramova, Mariana Alamancheva, Inna Simeonova and Ivan Tanev	Color; Mono; Comedy
Йо Хо Хо	Yo ho ho Yo ho ho	Zako Heskiya	98 min	Kiril Variyski, Viktor Chouchkov, Iliya Penev, Anani Anev, Sonya Djulgerova, Kirill Kavadarkov, Georgi Bakhchevanov and Boris Lukanov	Color; Mono; Drama; Romance, entered into the 12th Moscow International Film Festival
Боянският майстор	Boyanskiyat maystor The Master of Boyana	Zahari Zhendov	108min	Petar Despotov, Lyubomir Dimitrov, Bojka Velkova, Emil Markov, Atanas Bozhinov, Yordan Spirov and Petya Hrisu	Color; Mono; Drama; Romance
Капитан Петко войвода	Kapitan Petko Voyvoda; Captain Petko Voivode	Nedelcho Chernev		Vassil Mihaylov, Plamen Donchev, Petar Chernev, Stoyan Gudev, Prodan Nonchev, Naum Shopov, Vasil Banov, Bistra Marcheva, Nikola Chipriyanov, Dicho Dichev, Mariana Dimitrova and Djoko Rosic	Color; Mono; Drama; History; Eastern (TV series)
Мера Според Мера	Mera spored mera Measure for Measure	Georgi Djulgerov	288min	Rusi Chanev, Grigor Vachkov, Katia Ivanova, Stefan Mavrodiyev, Bogdan Glishev, Christine Bartlet, Rumena Trifonova, Tzvetana Maneva, Dimitar Buynozov, Vladimir Yochev, Margarita Karamiteva and Georgi Bakhchevanov	Color; Mono; Drama; History; Eastern
Търновската Царица	Tarnovskata tzaritza The Queen of Turnovo	Yanko Yankov	97 min	Kameliya Todorova, Stefan Danailov, Eli Skorcheva, Nevena Kokanova, Boris Lukanov, Minka Syulemezova, Kirill Kavadarkov, Djoko Rosic and Vasil Vachev	Color; Mono; Drama
Хан Аспарух	Khan Asparuh; Khan Asparuh	Ludmil Staikov		Stoyko Peev, Antony Genov, Vassil Mihajlov, Vania Tzvetkova, Stefan Getsov, Georgi Cherkelov, Iossif Surchadzhiev, Lora Kremen, Djoko Rosic, Velko Kynev, Anya Pencheva, Stoycho Mazgalov and Petar Slabakov	Color; Mono; Drama; History; War (Three Series)

=== 1982 ===
1982
Бяла Магия	Byala magiya White Magic	Ivan Andonov	97 min	Plamena Getova, Anton Gorchev, Velko Kynev, Ivan Grigorov, Ilka Zafirova, Georgi Kaloyanchev, Petar Slabakov, Kunka Baeva, Stoyan Gudev and Nikola Todev	Color; Mono; Drama
24 Часа Дъжд	24 chasa dazhd Twenty-Four Hours Raining	Vladislav Ikonomov	86 min	Ewa Szykulska, Stefan Mavrodiyev, Stefan Danailov, Kiril Variyski, Veljo Goranov, Nikola Dadov, Igor Kyulyumov, Lambi Kondov, Vassil Dimitrov, Ivan Dzhambazov and Stefan Peev	Color; Mono; Drama
Една Жена на Тридесет и Три	Edna zhena na trideset i tri A Woman at Thirty-Three	Christo Christov	102min	Lilyana Kovacheva, Bogdan Glishev, Veselin Vulkov, Gergana Bardarova, Georgi Novakov, Desislava Spirova, Dimitar Lisicharov, Pavel Spasov, Katya Dineva, Georgi Velchovski, Yakim Mihov and Angel Lambev	Color; Mono; Drama
Елегия	Elegia; Elegy	Eduard Zahariev	113min	Itzhak Fintzi, Anton Radichev, Mariana Dimitrova, Hristina Kostadinova, Katya Paskaleva, Panaiot Janev, Pavel Popandov, Ivan Kadiyski and Ivan Yanchev	Color; Mono; Drama
Комбина	Kombina; The Racket	Nikola Rudarov	119min	Ivan Ivanov, Vania Tzvetkova, Valcho Kamarashev, Nikolai Sotirov, Mario Krastev, Pavel Doychev, Svetozar Nedelchev, Zhivka Peneva, Panaiot Janev, Vladimir Yochev and Georgi Georgiev-Gocheto	Color; Mono; Drama; Thriller
Куче в Чекмедже	Kuche v chekmedzhe A Dog in a Drawer	Dimitar Petrov	80 min	Veselin Prahov, Martin Stoyanov, Ruzha Delcheva, Lyudmila Filipova, Evgeniya Genova, Alexandrina Pendatchanska, Rositza Stoycheva, Stefan Ilyev, Pavel Popandov, Ivan Yanchev and Aneta Sotirova	Color; Mono
Лавина	Lavina; Avalanche	Irina Aktasheva, Hristo Piskov	153min	Veliko Stoianov, Lyuben Chatalov, Stefan Stefanov, Diana Batzieva, Todor Nikolov, Bogumil Atanasov, Pavel Popandov, Ognyan Kupenov, Trayan Yankov, Vania Tzvetkova, Vasil Popiliev, Ivan Balsamadzhiev, Filip Trifonov and Ivan Ivanov	Color; Mono; Drama; Adventure
Оркестър без Име	Orkestar bez ime A Nameless Band	Lyudmil Kirkov		Velko Kynev, Filip Trifonov, Pavel Popandov, Georgi Mamalev, Katerina Evro, Maria Kavardjikova, Dimitar Manchev, Nikolay Nikolaev, Georgi Rusev, Ivan Tzvetarski, Anton Radichev and Ivan Yanchev	Color; Comedy
Рицарят на Бялата Дама	Ritzaryat na bylata dama The Knight of the White Lady	Petar Kaishev		Asen Kisimov, Klara Armandova, Georgi Rusev, Luchezar Stoyanov and Dimitar Ganev	Color;

=== 1983 ===
1983
Баш Майсторът Началник	Bash maystorat nachalnik The Past-Master Boss	Petar B. Vasilev	74 min	Kiril Gospodinov, Maria Stefanova, Stoyanka Mutafova, Yuri Angelov, Valentin Rusetzki, Sashka Bratanova, Georgi Kishkilov	Color; Mono; Comedy
Бон Шанс, Инспекторе!	Bon shans, inspektore! Bonne Chance, Inspector!	Peter Donev	94 min	Velko Kynev, Georgi Kaloyanchev, Tatyana Lolova, Iossif Surchadzhiev, Kameliya Todorova, Kirill Gospodinov, Stoyan Stoev, Dimitar Georgiev, Anton Radichev and Kirill Kavadarkov	Color; Mono; Retro Comedy
Господин за Един Ден	Gospodin za edin den King for a Day	Nikolai Volev	87 min	Todor Kolev, Yordanka Stefanova, Itzhak Fintzi, Stoyan Gadev, Nikola Pashov, Ivan Grigorov, Ivan Obretenov, Pavel Popandov and Georgi Mamalev	Color; Mono; Comedy; Drama
Константин Философ	Konstantin filosof Constantine the Philosopher	Gueorgui Stoyanov	240min	Rusi Chanev, Marin Yanev, Naum Shopov, Itzhak Fintzi, Georgi Cherkelov, Velko Kynev, Nevena Kokanova, Andrey Chaprazov, Vitomir Saraivanov, Nikolai Binev, Rashko Mladenov and Pavel Popandov	Entered into the 13th Moscow International Film Festival
Равновесие	Ravnovesie; Balance	Lyudmil Kirkov	140min	Georgi Georgiev-Getz, Plamena Getova, Konstantin Kotsev, Katerina Evro, Pavel Popandov, Vania Tzvetkova, Stefan Danailov, Luchezar Stoyanov, Ivan Dzhambazov, Maria Stefanova, Lyuben Chatalov and Anton Radichev	Color; Mono; Drama
Хотел Централ	Hotel Tsentral; Hotel Central	Veselin Branev	105min	Iren Krivoshieva, Zhivko Garvanov, Valentin Gadzhokov, Boryana Puncheva, Anton Radichev, Stoyan Stoev, Konstantin Dimchev, Boris Lukanov and Georgi Rusev	Color; Mono; Drama

=== 1984 ===
1984
Горе на Черешата	Gore na chereshata On the Top of the Cherry Tree	Mariana Evstatieva-Biolcheva	90 min	Veselin Prahov, Todor Trankarov, Tzvetanka Uzunova, Mincho Minchev, Konstantin Kotsev, Lyuben Chatalov, Anton Gorchev	Color; Mono
Златният Век	Zlatniyat vek The Golden Age	Lyuben Morchev		Marius Donkin, Rumyan Lazov, Kiril Yanev, Vassil Mihajlov, Bogomil Simeonov, Ivan Kondov, Anya Pencheva	Color; Mono; History; Drama; War; (TV Series)
Не Знам, Не Чух, Не Видях	Ne znam, ne chuh, ne vidyah I Don't Know, I Didn't Hear, I Didn't See	Lyudmil Kirkov	76 min	Stefan Mavrodiyev, Vladimir Kolev, Plamena Getova, Banko Bankov, Konstantin Tsanev, Maria Kavardjikova, Plamen Donchev,	Color; Mono; Crime; Drama;
Опасен Чар	Opasen char Dangerous Charm	Ivan Andonov	90 min	Todor kolev, Nevena Kokanova, Stefan Mavrodiyev, Georgi Rusev, Tatyana Lolova, Nadya Todorova, Tzvetana Maneva, Margarita Karamiteva, Lyuben Chatalov, Petar Petrov	Color; Mono; Comedy; Thriller
Откога Те Чакам	Otkoga te chakam It's Nice to See You	Anna Petkova	103min	Tzvetana Maneva, Elena Stefanova, Katya Todorova, Assen Milanov, Georgi Georgiev-Getz, Georgi Kaloyanchev, Petar Slabakov, Leda Taseva, Marin Yanev, Plamen Donchev, Lyubomir Bachvarov, Aneta Sotirova	Color; Mono; Drama;

=== 1985 ===
1985
Борис I	Boris I Boris I	Borislav Sharaliev	263min	Stefan Danailov, Boris Lukanov, Aneta Petrovska, Antony Genov, Ventzislav Kisyov, Kosta Tsonev, Plamen Donchev, Ivan Ivanov, Yanina Kasheva, Adriana Petrova, Irinei Konstantinov, Kiril Variyski	Color; Drama; History (Two Episodes)
Маневри на Петия Етаж	Manevri na petiya etazh Maneuvers on the Fifth Floor	Petar B. Vasilev	94 min	Stefan Danailov, Velko Kynev, Anton Radichev, Ventzislav Valchev, Vasil Stoychev, Ivan Grigorov, Maria Stefanova, Aneta Sotirova, Maria Statoulova, Iskra Radeva, Ivan Yanchev	Color; Mono; Comedy
Нощем с Белите Коне	Noshtem s belite kone Nights with the White Horses	Zako Heskija		Nikolai Binev, Ivan Ivanov, Ginka Stancheva, Lyubomir Mladenov, Pasha Berova, Plamen Sirakov, Plamena Getova, Boris Lukanov, Bogdan Glishev	Color; Mono; Drama
Романтична История	Romantichna istoriya Romantic Story	Milen Nikolov	105min	Ivan Ivanov, Iren Krivoshieva, Itzhak Fintzi, Domna Ganeva, Boyan Milushev	Color; Mono; Drama
Търси се Съпруг за Мама	Tarsi se saprug za mama A Husband for Mum	Mariana Evstatieva-Biolcheva	88 min	Veselin Prahov, Tzvetana Maneva, Bogdan Glishev, Pavel Popandov	Color; Mono

=== 1986 ===
1986
Да Обичаш на Инат	Da obichash na inat Stubborn Love	Nikolai Volev	92 min	Velko Kynev, Ivan Velkov, Maria Statoulova, Leda Taseva, Kina Mutafova, Boyan Milushev	Color; Mono; Drama
За Къде Пътувате	Za kude putuvate Where Are You Going?	Rangel Vulchanov	93 min	Stoyan Aleksiev, Georgi Kaloyanchev, Katerina Evro, Iossif Surchadzhiev, Yordan Spirov	Screened at Cannes and Moscow
Скъпа Моя, Скъпи Мой	Skapa moya, skapi moy My Darling, My Darling	Eduard Zahariev	107min	Mariana Dimitrova, Plamen Sirakov, Ivan Donev, Raya Bachvarova, Andrey Todorov, Anton Radichev	Color; Mono; Drama, Entered into the 36th Berlin International Film Festival
Съдията	Sadiyata; The Judge	Plamen Maslarov	89 min	Georgi Cherkelov, Djoko Rosic, Tzako Dachev, Vasil Banov, Plamen Donchev, Ivaylo Hristov, Kalin Arsov, Nikolay Latev, Krastyo Lafazanov, Kiril Variyski	Color; Mono; Drama; Eastern
Характеристика	Harakteristika; Reference	Christo Christov	96 min	Ivaylo Geraskov, Itzhak Fintzi, Lilyana Kovacheva, Jorzheta Nikolova, Atanass Atanassov, Plamen Sirakov, Vassil Mihajlov, Georgi Kaloyanchev	Entered into the 14th Moscow International Film Festival

=== 1987 ===
1987
Васко де Гама от Село Рупча	Vasko de Gama ot selo Rupcha; Vasko de Gama from Rupcha Village	Dimitar Petrov		Ivan Laskin, Iliya Lingurski, Georgi Markov, Irena Minkova, Georgi Georgiev-Getz, Pavel Popandov, Maria Kavardjikova, Georgi Mamalev, Stoycho Mazgalov, Georgi Rusev, Marin Yanev	Color; Mono; (TV Series)
Дом за Нашите Деца	Dom za nashite deca Home for Our Children	Nedelcho Chernev	306min	Emilia Radeva, Kosta Tsonev, Maria Kavardjikova, Georgi Novakov, Elzhana Popova, Eli Skorcheva, Valentin Gadzhokov, Nevena Kokanova, Stefan Danailov, Georgi Kaloyanchev, Ivan Yanev, Vassil Mihajlov, Marius Donkin	Color; Mono; Drama; (TV Series)
Ева на Третия Етаж	Eva na tretiya etazh Eve on the Third Floor	Ivanka Grybcheva	95 min	Eli Skorcheva, Marin Yanev, Pepa Nikolova, Katya Paskaleva, Maria Statoulova, Maria Kavardjikova, Zhivko Garvanov, Asen Kisimov, Plamena Getova, Dimitar Buynozov	Color; Mono; Drama
Живот до Поискване	Zhivot do poiskvane Life, Post Restate	Kosta Bikov	91 min	Lyuben Chatalov, Katia Ivanova, Ivaylo Geraskov, Filip Trifonov, Adriana Petrova, Yuri Angelov, Lyudmil Todorov, Dimitar Shkumbata-Tudzharov	Color; Mono; Drama
Левакът	Levakat; The Mooncalf	Petar B. Vasilev	80 min	Ivaylo Geraskov, Stefan Danailov, Jolanta Pientec, Andrei Andreyev, Kristal Konstantinova, Anton Radichev	Color; Mono; Drama

=== 1988 ===
1988
А сега накъде?	A sega nakade? And Where Do We Go from Here?	Rangel Vulchanov	93 min	Albena Stavreva, Ani Valchanova, Antoaneta Stancheva, Georgi Enchev, Georgi Staykov	Color; Dolby SR; Drama
Ако можеш, забрави	Ako mozhesh, zabravi Forget It If You Can	Nikolai Bosilkov	84 min	Ivan Grigorov, Veselin Tsanev, Yordan Bikov, Zhulieta Raleva, Kameliya Nedkova, Sofiya Kuzeva, Hristina Madzhurova, Albena Dodeva, Valeriya Todorova	Color; Mono; Comedy
Време разделно	Vreme razdelno Time of Violence	Ludmil Staikov	288min	Iossif Surchadzhiev, Rusi Chanev, Ivan Krystev, Anya Pencheva, Valter Toski, Vassil Mihajlov, Kalina Stefanova, Max Freeman, Konstantin Kotsev, Stoyko Peev, Bogomil Simeonov, Djoko Rosic, Velko Kynev, Stefka Berova	Color; Dolby SR; Drama; History
Вчера	Vchera; Yesterday	Ivan Andonov	84 min	Hristo Shopov, Georgi Staykov, Sofiya Kuzeva, Svetla Todorova, Georgi Rusev, Nikola Rudarov, Stoyan Aleksiev, Pavel Popandov, Maria Stefanova, Petar Popyordanov, Kosta Tsonev, Boris Lukanov, Nadya Todorova	Color; Mono; Drama

=== 1989 ===
1989
Адио, Рио	Adio, Rio; Adio, Rio	Ivan Andonov	88 min	Filip Trifonov, Vania Tzvetkova, Petar Popyordanov, Georgi Mamalev, Nikola Rudarov, Georgi Rusev, Natalia Dontcheva, Nadya Todorova, Latinka Petrova, Nikola Todev, Pavel Popandov, Dimitar Goranov, Anani Yavashev	Color; Mono; Comedy; Thriller
Аз, Графинята	Az, grafinyata Me, the Countess	Petar Popzlatev	119min	Svetla Yancheva, Alexander Doynov, Itzhak Fintzi, Valcho Kamarashev, Katya Paskaleva, Petar Popyordanov, Maria Statoulova, Ilia Dobrev, Krystjo Lafazanov, Martina Vachkova, Hristo Garbov, Iren Krivoshieva	Color; Mono; Drama
Маргарит и Маргарита	Margarit i Margarita; Margarit and Margarita	Nikolai Volev	92 min	Irini Antonios Zampona, Hristo Shopov, Rashko Mladenov, Vassil Mihajlov, Veselin Vulkov, Iliya Raev, Tanya Shahova, Kina Dasheva, Elena Rainova, Stoyan Stoev, Marin Damyanov	Color; Mono; Drama
Иван и Александра	1952: Ivan i Aleksandra	Ivan Nitchev	80 minutes		Entered into the 39th Berlin International Film Festival
