= 1871 in literature =

This article contains information about the literary events and publications of 1871.

== Events ==
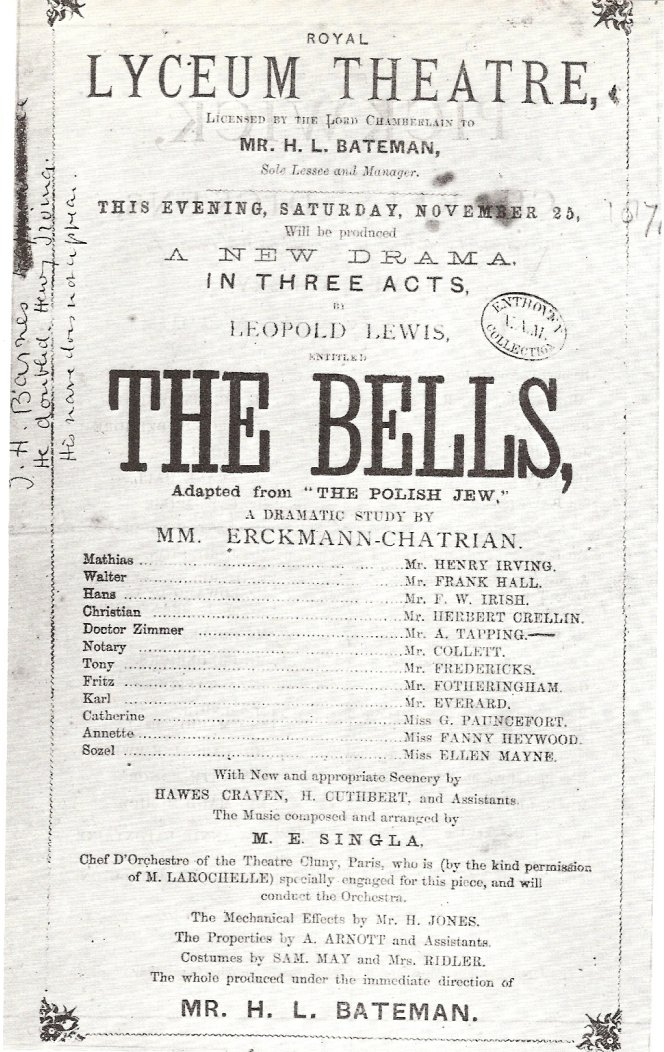
Programme for the opening night of The Bells

Henry Irving as Mathias in The Bells

- January 1 – The children's literary magazine Young Folks begins publication in the United Kingdom as Our Young Folks' Weekly Budget.
- January – John Ruskin begins publishing Fors Clavigera, his originally monthly "letters to the workmen and labourers of Great Britain".
- March 18–May 28 – The Paris Commune is influential on the literary figures in the city at the time and far beyond:
  - Jules Vallès publishes his newspaper Le Cri du Peuple February 22–May 23 (with interruptions).
  - At the beginning of April, Victor Hugo moves to Brussels to take care of the family of his son Charles Hugo, who has just died, but closely follows events in Paris.
  - Émile Zola, as a journalist for Le Sémaphore de Marseille, reports the fall of the Commune, and is one of the first reporters to enter the city during Semaine sanglante (Bloody Week, beginning May 21).
- October – "Thomas Maitland", i.e. Robert Williams Buchanan, attacks Dante Gabriel Rossetti and other members of what Buchanan calls the "Fleshly School" of English poetry in The Contemporary Review. On December 16 Rossetti replies in "The Stealthy School of Criticism" in the Athenaeum.
- November 25 – First performance of The Bells starring Henry Irving at the Lyceum Theatre, London, the actor's first great success. On the same night, he breaks up permanently with his wife when she criticises his choice of profession.
- December – Publication of George Eliot's novel Middlemarch in eight parts commences.
- unknown date
  - Under the direction of John Ruskin, George Allen sets up his publishing company, predecessors of Allen & Unwin, in London.
  - James Edward Austen-Leigh publishes a second edition of his 1869 book A Memoir of Jane Austen, including two unpublished novellas by his aunt Jane Austen (who had died in 1817): Lady Susan (written in 1794) and The Watsons (written in 1803-1805)

== New books ==
=== Fiction ===
- William Black – A Daughter of Heth
- Mary Elizabeth Braddon – Fenton's Quest
- George Chesney – The Battle of Dorking (invasion novella and science fiction precursor, originally published anonymously in Blackwood's Magazine, May)
- Edward Eggleston – The Hoosier Schoolmaster
- George Eliot – Middlemarch (first of eight installments)
- Edward Bulwer-Lytton – The Coming Race
- Thomas Hardy – Desperate Remedies
- Vanchinbalyn Injinash – The Blue Chronicle (köke sudur, Хөх судар; completed in MS)
- Henry James – Watch and Ward
- George Meredith – The Adventures of Harry Richmond
- Charles Reade – A Terrible Temptation
- Emily Spender – Restored (feminist novel)
- Anthony Trollope -
  - Ralph the Heir
  - Sir Harry Hotspur of Humblethwaite
- Giovanni Verga – Storia di una capinera (The Sparrow; book publication)
- Jules Verne – A Floating City (Une ville flottante)
- Émile Zola – La Fortune des Rougon

=== Children and young people ===
- Alexander Afanasyev (collected) – «Русские детские сказки» (Russian Children's Fairy Tales)
- Louisa M. Alcott – Little Men
- George MacDonald – At the Back of the North Wind
- Samuel Smiles – A Boy's Voyage Round the World
- Johanna Spyri – Ein Blatt auf Vrony’s Grab (A Note on Vrony's Grave)

=== Drama ===
- François Coppée
  - Fais ce que Dois
  - L'Abandonnée
- W. S. Gilbert – Pygmalion and Galatea
- Leopold David Lewis – The Bells (adapted from Erckmann-Chatrian's Le Juif Polonais)
- Alexander Ostrovsky – The Forest (Russian: Лес, Les)
- Dobri Voynikov – The Phoney Civilization (Bulgarian: Криворазбраната цивилизация, Krivorazbranata tsivilizatsiya)

=== Poetry ===
- Arthur Rimbaud - Le Bateau ivre ("The Drunken Boat")
- Algernon Charles Swinburne - Songs before Sunrise

=== Non-fiction ===
- John Burroughs - Wake-Robin
- Charles Darwin – The Descent of Man, and Selection in Relation to Sex
- William Gifford Palgrave – Personal Narrative of a Year’s Journey through Central and Eastern Arabia (1862–63)
- Edward Burnett Tylor – Primitive Culture
- Walt Whitman - Democratic Vistas

== Births ==
- January 9 – Eugène Marais, South African lawyer, naturalist, poet and writer (died 1936)
- February 22 – John Langalibalele Dube, Zulu writer (died 1946)
- February 25 (February 13 OS) – Lesya Ukrainka, Ukrainian poet and writer (died 1913)
- February 28 – Manuel Díaz Rodríguez, Venezuelan writer and politician (died 1927)
- March 5 – Rosa Luxemburg, Polish-born German revolutionary socialist (died 1919)
- March 27 – Heinrich Mann, German narrator, dramatist and essayist (died 1950)
- June 17 – James Weldon Johnson, American writer and activist (died 1938)
- May 6 – Christian Morgenstern, German poet (died 1914)
- May 14 – Caton Theodorian, Romanian dramatist and novelist (died 1939)
- June 5 – Nicolae Iorga, Romanian historian, politician, culture critic, poet and playwright (died 1940)
- July 3 – W. H. Davies, Welsh poet (died 1940)
- July 10 – Marcel Proust, French novelist (died 1922)
- August 21 (August 9 OS) – Leonid Andreyev, Russian short story writer and playwright (died 1919)
- August 27 – Theodore Dreiser, American novelist (died 1945)
- September 27 – Grazia Deledda, Italian writer and Nobel Prize winner (died 1926)
- October 7 – Georg Hermann, German fiction writer (died 1943)
- October 10 – Wickham Steed, English journalist, editor and historian (died 1956)
- October 30 – Paul Valéry, French poet (died 1945)
- November 1 – Stephen Crane, American novelist (died 1900)
- November 10 – Winston Churchill, American novelist (died 1947)

== Deaths ==
- January 12 – Auguste Anicet-Bourgeois, French dramatist (born 1806)
- February 4 – Hermann, Fürst von Pückler-Muskau, German travel and gardening writer (born 1785)
- February 9 – Martha Haines Butt, American novelist (born 1833)
- February 12 – Alice Cary, American poet (tuberculosis, born 1820)
- March 17 – Robert Chambers, Scottish writer and publisher (born 1802)
- March 28 – Joseph Isidore Samson, French playwright and actor (born 1793)
- July 6 – Castro Alves, Brazilian poet and playwright (tuberculosis;born 1847)
- July 31 – Phoebe Cary, American poet (born 1824)
- July 15 – Ján Chalupka, Slovak dramatist (born 1791)
- September 16 – Jan Erazim Vocel, Czech poet, archaeologist, historian and cultural revivalist (born 1803)
- November 2 – Athalia Schwartz, Danish writer, journalist and educator (born 1821)
- December 8 – Thomas Gaspey, English novelist and journalist (born 1788)
- December 21 – Luise Aston, German author and feminist (born 1814)
