= Hindo Kasimov =

Bulgarian actor

Hindo Kasimov Хиндо Касимов
- Hindo Kasimov in 1980
- Born: Hindo Kasimov; October 11, 1934; Burgas, Bulgaria
- Died: July 24, 1986 (aged 51); Sofia, Bulgaria
- Occupations: Film and Stage Actor
- Years active: 1955–1986

Hindo Kasimov (Bulgarian: Хиндо Касимов) was a Bulgarian stage and film actor born in 1934, deceased in 1986.

== Biography ==
He is best known for the television comedy sketches performed by him together with leading Bulgarian actors as Vasil Popov, Georgi Partsalev, Stoyanka Mutafova and others. He is also known for the numerous roles on the stage of the Satirical Theatre „Aleko Konstantinov“, Sofia where he remained until his untimely death in 1986. Some notable appearances on the stage include the plays “Marriage” by Nikolai Gogol, “Doctor” by Branislav Nušić and “January” by Yordan Radichkov. Kasimov is in the cast of the popular TV musical The Phoney Civilization released by the Bulgarian National Television in 1974.

== Selected filmography ==
Year	Film			Role	Notes
Year	English title	Bulgarian title	Transliteration	Role	Notes
1965	The End of the Summer Holiday	Краят на една ваканция	Krayat na edna vakantziya		directed by Lyudmil Kirkov
1968	The Swedish Kings	Шведските крале	Shvedskite krale	the taxi driver	directed by Lyudmil Kirkov
1971	Naked Conscience	Гола съвест	Gola savest	Bancho the commission agent	
1974	The Phoney Civilization	Криворазбраната цивилизация	Krivorazbranata tsivilizatsiya	Pencho	TV musical directed by Hacho Boyadzhiev
1974	Dawn Over the Drava	Зарево над Драва	Zarevo nad Drava		directed by Zako Heskiya
1980	The Soloist	Солистът	Solistat		
1980	Maybe a Frigate	Може би фрегата	Mozhe bi fregata	Stancho	

== Selected theatre appearances ==
The following table presents the Kasimov's appearances on the stage of the Satirical Theatre “Aleko Konstantinov”, Sofia.

Year	Play			Playwright	Notes
Year	English title	Bulgarian title	Transliteration	Playwright	Notes
1959	Bed bug	Дървеница	Darvenitsa	Vladimir Mayakovsky	directed by Boyan Danovski
1960	Uncles	Чичовци	Chichovtsi	Ivan Vazov	directed by Metodi Andonov
1961	The Models' Ball	Балът на манекените	Balat na manekenite	Bruno Jasieński	directed by Grisha Ostrovski
1961	The Resistible Rise of Arturo Ui	Удържимият възход на Артуро Хи	Udarzhimiyat vazhod na Arturo Hi	Bertolt Brecht	directed by Boyan Danovski
1962	The Pig tails	Свинските опашчици	Svinskite opashchitsi	Jaroslav Dietl	directed by Metodi Andonov
1962	Improvisation	Импровизация	Improvizatsiya	Valeri Petrov; Radoy Ralin	directed by Grisha Ostrovski
1963	Frank V	Франк V	Frank V	Friedrich Dürrenmatt	directed by Grisha Ostrovski
1963	Mihal Mishkoed	Михал Мишкоед	Mihal Mishkoed	Sava Dobroplodni	directed by Metodi Andonov
1964	The Fourth Vertebra	Четвъртият прешлен	Chetvartiyat preshlen	Martti Larni	directed by Grisha Ostrovski
1965	Tarelkin's Death	Смъртта на Тарелкин	Smarta na Tarelkin	Aleksandr Sukhovo-Kobylin	directed by Metodi Andonov
1965	The Fire Raisers	Бидерман и подпалвачите	Biderman i podpalvachite	Max Frisch	directed by Grisha Ostrovski
1966	The Government Inspector	Ревизор	Revizor	Nikolai Gogol	directed by Metodi Andonov
1969	The Old Man and the Arrow	Старчето и стрелата	Starcheto i strelata	Nikola Rusev	directed by Metodi Andonov
1975	January	Януари	Yanuari	Yordan Radichkov	directed by Lyubomir Sharlandzhiev
1978	Doctor	Д-р	Doctor	Branislav Nušić	directed by Anastas Mihaylov
1980	Bus	Рейс	Reys	Stanislav Stratiev	directed by Mladen Kiselov
1980	Of Too Much Mind	От много ум	Ot mnogo um	Stefan Kostov	directed by Asen Shopov
1981	Cabaret “Parnas”	Кабаре “Парнас”	Kabare “Parnas”	Lyubomir Peevski	directed by Margarita Mladenova and Mladen Kiselov
1981	Uncles	Чичовци	Chichovtsi	Ivan Vazov	directed by Margarita Mladenova and Mladen Kiselov the second staging
1983	Turandot	Принцеса Турандот	Printsesa Turandot	Carlo Gozzi	directed by Vili Tsankov
1984	The New Port	Новото пристанище	Novoto Pristanishte	Stefan Kostov	directed by Nikolay Polyakov
1985	Mr. Balkanski	Господин Балкански	Gospodin Balkanski	Georgi Danailov	directed by Ivan Dobchev
