= Jacques Dufilho =

French actor

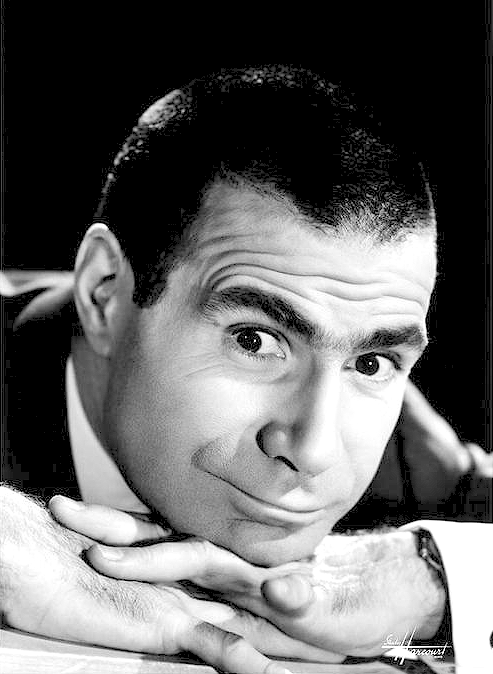
- Jacques Dufilho in 1960.
- Born: 19 February 1914; Bègles, Aquitaine, France
- Died: 28 August 2005 (aged 91); Lectoure, France
- Occupation: Actor
- Years active: 1939–2004
- Notable work: La Guerre des boutons Cher Victor; Black and White in Color

Jacques Dufilho (19 February 1914 – 28 August 2005) was a French actor. He was born in Bègles (Gironde) and he died in Lectoure (Gers).

== Life and career ==
Dufilho appeared in 65 French productions. Moreover, he was frequently seen in Italian films. In 1978 he received a César Award for Best Supporting Actor for his performance in Le Crabe-tambour and in 1980 another one for his role in Un mauvais fils.

The actor was also known as a collector of Bugatti vintage cars.

== Selected filmography ==
Year	Title	Role	Director
1948	The Farm of Seven Sins	François Sovignant	Jean Devaivre
1951	Bibi Fricotin	the uncle	Marcel Blistène
1954	Le Chevalier de la nuit	Monsieur Machard	Robert Darène
1954	Love in a Hot Climate	Chispa	Georges Rouquier and Ricardo Muñoz Suay
1955	Marie Antoinette Queen of France	Marat	Jean Delannoy
1956	Short Head	the stable-boy	Norbert Carbonnaux
1956	Notre-Dame de Paris	Guillaume Rousseau	Jean Delannoy
1957	The Happy Road	Michel Bertrand	Gene Kelly
1958	A Tale of Two Cities	uncredited	Ralph Thomas
1958	Taxi, Roulotte et Corrida	the taxi passenger	André Hunebelle
1958	Maxime	policeman	Henri Verneuil
1959	I Tartassati	the prison director	Steno
1960	Zazie dans le Métro	Ferdinand Gridoux	Louis Malle
1961	Dans l'eau qui fait des bulles	Alphonse, the undertaker	Maurice Delbez
1962	War of the Buttons	Aztec's father	Yves Robert
1962	Un clair de lune à Maubeuge	the director	Jean Chérasse
1962	La Poupée	the Indian	Jacques Baratier
1963	Sweet and Sour	Monsieur Alfonso	Jacques Baratier
1964	The Visit	Fish	Bernhard Wicki
1965	James Tont operazione U.N.O.	Y	Bruno Corbucci
1965	Lady L	Bealu	Peter Ustinov
1967	The Unknown Man of Shandigor	Schoskatovich	Jean-Louis Roy
1968	Benjamin	Camille	Michel Deville
1971	Les bidasses en folie	the colonel	Claude Zidi
1973	Supermen Against the Orient	American ambassador	Bitto Albertini
1973	The Heavenly Bodies (Les Corps célestes)	Le Curé	Gilles Carle
1974	Erotomania	Professor Pazzoni	Marco Vicario
1975	Cher Victor	Victor Lasalle	Robin Davis
1976	Black and White in Color	Paul Rechampot	Jean-Jacques Annaud
1977	Le Crabe-tambour	the technical manager	Pierre Schoendoerffer
1978	Nosferatu the Vampyre	the captain	Werner Herzog
1980	Fantômas (TV miniseries)	Inspector Juve	Claude Chabrol, Juan Luis Buñuel
1980	The Horse of Pride	grandfather Alain	Claude Chabrol
1991	Les Enfants du naufrageur	Petit Louis	Jerome Foulon
1999	The Children of the Marshland	the old man	Jean Becker
