= Three Reservists =

Тримата от запаса Trimata ot zapasa (Three Reservists)
- Directed by: Zako Heskiya
- Written by: Pavel Vezhinov
- Starring: Georgi Partsalev; Kiril Gospodinov; Nikola Anastasov
- Cinematography: Hristo Valchanov
- Music by: Simeon Pironkov
- Production company: SFF
- Release date: 1971
- Running time: 97 minutes
- Country: Bulgaria
- Language: Bulgarian

Three Reservists (Bulgarian: Тримата от запаса, romanized: Trimata ot zapasa) is a Bulgarian comedy-drama war film released in 1971, directed by Zako Heskiya, starring Georgi Partsalev, Kiril Gospodinov and Nikola Anastasov.

The winter of 1945, the First Bulgarian Army is engaged in the battles for the liberation of Hungary from the Nazis during the Second World War. Three men are sent to join the army, but they are completely unprepared and without a clear idea of warfare. They are laughable with their inability to cope with their tasks.

Upon its release, the film won wide popularity. The memorable performances by Partsalev, Gospodinov and Anastasov turned their characters into favorites of the audience. Three Reservists became one of the film classics of the Bulgarian cinematography from those years.

== Cast ==
- Georgi Partsalev as Ivan Staykov
- Nikola Anastasov as Peyo Vutov
- Kiril Gospodinov as Spiro Stoimenov
- Valcho Kamarashev as the master sergeant
- Stoycho Mazgalov as the assistant commander
- Tünde Szabó as Ilonka (the Hungarian girl)
- Bella Tsoneva as Peyo's wife
- Vasil Popiliev as the commander
- Slavcho Mitev
- Dimitar Yordanov
- Dimiter Milushev
- Gani Staykov
- Nikola Dobrev
- Vasil Yotov
- Vladimir Davcev
- Nikola Dadov
