= 40th Venice International Film Festival =

Italian film festival in 1983

- Festival poster
- Location: Venice, Italy
- Founded: 1932
- Awards: Golden Lion: First Name: Carmen
- Festival date: 31 August – 11 September 1983
- Website: Website

Venice Film Festival chronology
- 41st 39th

The 40th annual Venice International Film Festival was held from 31 August to 11 September 1983.

Italian filmmaker Bernardo Bertolucci was the Jury President of the main competition. The Golden Lion winner was First Name: Carmen directed by Jean-Luc Godard.

== Jury ==
The following people comprised the 1983 jury:

- Bernardo Bertolucci, Italian filmmaker - Jury President
- Jack Clayton, British director and producer
- Peter Handke, Austrian novelist
- Leon Hirszman, Brazilian filmmaker
- Márta Mészáros, Hungarian filmmaker
- Nagisa Oshima, Japanese filmmaker
- Gleb Panfilov, Soviet filmmaker
- Bob Rafelson, American filmmaker
- Ousmane Sembene, Senegalese filmmaker
- Mrinal Sen, Indian filmmaker
- Alain Tanner, Swiss filmmaker
- Agnès Varda, French filmmaker, photographer and artist

== Official Sections ==
The following films were selected to be screened:

=== In Competition ===
English title	Original title	Director(s)	Production country
Biquefarre		Georges Rouquier	France
Careful, He Might Hear You		Carl Schultz	Australia
The Deserter	Il disertore	Giuliana Berlinguer	Italy
Edith's Diary	Ediths Tagebuch	Hans W. Geissendörfer	West Germany
Embers	Glut	Thomas Koerfer	Switzerland, West Germany
First Name: Carmen	Prénom Carmen	Jean-Luc Godard	France
Hanna K.		Costa-Gavras	France, Israel, United States Bulgaria
Jogo de Mão		Monique Rutler	Portugal
Life Is a Bed of Roses	La vie est un roman	Alain Resnais	France
A Love in Germany	Eine Liebe in Deutschland	Andrzej Wajda	West Germany, France, Poland
The Makioka Sisters	細雪	Kon Ichikawa	Japan
Maria Chapdelaine		Gilles Carle	Canada
The Millennial Bee	Tisícročná včela	Juraj Jakubisko	Czechoslovakia, West Germany
Mother Mary	Мать Мария	Sergey Kolosov	Soviet Union
The Power of Emotion	Die Macht der Gefühle	Alexander Kluge	West Germany
A School Outing	Una gita scolastica	Pupi Avati	Italy
Streamers		Robert Altman	United States
The Turning Point	Der Aufenthalt	Frank Beyer	East Germany

=== Out of Competition ===
English title	Original title	Director(s)	Production country
And the Ship Sails On	E la nave va	Federico Fellini	Italy, France
City of Pirates	La ville des pirates	Raoul Ruiz	France
Fanny and Alexander	Fanny och Alexander	Ingmar Bergman	Sweden
Milano '83		Ermanno Olmi	Italy
Zelig		Woody Allen	United States

=== Venezia Giovani ===
English title	Original title	Director(s)	Production country
1919, crónica del alba		Antonio Betancor	Spain
Dust of Empire	Poussière d'empire	Lâm Lê	France
The Happy Bachelors	快乐的单身汉	Chong Song	China
Hotel Central	Хотел Централ	Veselin Branev	Bulgaria
Lontano da dove		Stefania Casini, Francesca Marciano	Italy
Il momento dell'avventura		Faliero Rosati	Italy
Never Cry Wolf		Carroll Ballard	United States
The Ploughman's Lunch		Richard Eyre	United Kingdom
Straight Through the Heart	Mitten ins Herz	Doris Dörrie	West Germany
Sugar Cane Alley	La Rue Cases-Nègres	Euzhan Palcy	France, Martinique
A Wife for My Son	زوجة لابني	Ali Ghalem	Algeria

=== Venezia Giorno ===
English title	Original title	Director(s)	Production country
250 Grammes: A Radioactive Testament	250 grammaa - Radioaktiivinen testamentti	Pirjo Honkasalo, Pekka Lehto	Finland
Ascendancy		Edward Bennett	United Kingdom
The Crazy Years of the Twist	Les folles années du twist	Mahmoud Zemmouri	Algeria, France
Dark Habits	Entre tinieblas	Pedro Almodóvar	Spain
A Season in Hakkari	Hakkari'de Bir Mevsim	Erden Kiral	Turkey
Legati da tenera amicizia		Alfredo Giannetti	Italy
Naughty Boys	扭計雜牌軍	Wellson Chin	Hong Kong
Vassa		Gleb Panfilov	Soviet Union
Special events
All About Mankiewicz		Luc Béraud, Michel Ciment	France
Breathless (1960)	À bout de souffle	Jean-Luc Godard	France
Drittes Jahrtausend		Jorge Bodanzky, Wolf Gauer	France
The Fall of Fascism	La caduta del fascismo	Ernesto G. Laura	Italy
Farrebique ou Les Quatre Saisons (1946)		Georges Rouquier	France
L'Italia viva		Luigi Turolla	Italy
Journey to the Land of Rimbaud	Voyage au pays De Rimbaud	Dariush Mehrjui	France
Maria Chapdelaine (1934)		Julien Duvivier	France
Metropoli		Mario Franco	Italy
Pam Kuso Kar (1974)		Jean Rouch	France
Portrait de Raymond Depardon		André Lenôtre, Jean Rouch	France
Tale of an Encounter	Histoire d'une rencontre	Brahim Tsaki	Italy
Ten Minutes of Silence for John Lennon		Raymond Depardon	France
Tristana (1970)		Luis Buñuel	Spain
Unknown Chaplin		Kevin Brownlow, David Gill	United Kingdom
Yenendi Gengel		Jean Rouch	France

=== Venezia Notte ===
English title	Original title	Director(s)	Production country
Blue Thunder		John Badham	United States
Breathless		Jim McBride	United States
Danton		Andrzej Wajda	France, Poland, West Germany
Flashdance		Adrian Lyne	United States
Io con te non ci sto più		Gianni Amico	Italy
Runners		Charles Sturridge	United Kingdom
Return of the Jedi		Richard Marquand	United States
Spring Symphony	Frühlingssinfonie	Peter Schamoni	West Germany
Under Fire		Roger Spottiswoode	United States
Tribute to George Cukor
A Star Is Born (1954)		George Cukor	United States

=== Venezia De Sica ===
English title	Original title	Director(s)	Production country
Divergenze parallele		Renato Meneghetti	Italy
Favoriti e vincenti		Salvatore Maira	Italy
Flipper		Andrea Barzini	Italy
Il cavaliere, la morte e il diavolo		Beppe Cino	Italy
Un foro nel parabrezza		Sauro Scavolini	Italy
The Prince of Homburg	Il principe di Homburg	Gabriele Lavia	Italy
Occhio nero, occhio biondo e occhio felino		Muzzi Loffredo	Italy
Dream of a Summer Night	Sogno di una notte d'estate	Gabriele Salvatores	Italy
Summertime		Massimo Mazzucco	Italy
Testadura		Daniele Segre	Italy
Toxic Love	Amore tossico	Claudio Caligari	Italy

== Official Awards ==
- Golden Lion: First Name: Carmen by Jean-Luc Godard
- Grand Special Jury Prize: Biquefarre by Georges Rouquier
- Silver Lion: Sugar Cane Alley by Euzhan Palcy
- Volpi Cup for Best Actor: Matthew Modine, Michael Wright, Mitchell Lichtenstein, David Alan Grier, Guy Boyd, and George Dzundza for Streamers
- Volpi Cup for Best Actress: Darling Légitimus for Sugar Cane Alley

=== Career Golden Lion ===
- Michelangelo Antonioni

== Independent Awards ==
=== FIPRESCI Prize ===
- Fanny and Alexander by Ingmar Bergman
- Die Macht der Gefühle by Alexander Kluge

=== Pasinetti Award ===
- Best Film: Zelig by Woody Allen
- Best Actor: Carlo Delle Piane for Una gita scolastica
- Best Actress: Angela Winkler for Edith's Diary

=== Pietro Bianchi Award ===
- Luigi Zampa

=== De Sica Award ===
- Summertime by Massimo Mazzucco
- Toxic Love by Claudio Caligari
- Technical Prize: Raoul Coutard & François Musy for First Name: Carmen
