= Every Kilometer =

- Directed by: Nedelcho Chernev; Lyubomir Sharlandzhiev
- Screenplay by: Svoboda Bachvarova; Evgeni Konstantinov; Kostadin Kyulyumov; Georgi Markov; Pavel Vezhinov
- Starring: Stefan Danailov; Grigor Vachkov; Georgi Cherkelov; Georgi Georgiev-Getz
- Music by: Atanas Boyadzhiev; Peter Stupel
- Production company: Nu Boyana Film Studios
- Distributed by: Bulgarian National Television; Nu Boyana Film Studios
- Release date: 20 August 1969
- Running time: 755 minutes
- Country: Bulgaria
- Language: Bulgarian

Every kilometer (Bulgarian: На всеки километър) is a Bulgarian Televised-movie series from the late 1960s and early 1970s about the Bulgarian anti-fascist resistance during the 1920s-1940s.

The series consists of 26 episodes divided into two parts as 13 episodes - the first covering the period between 1923 and 9 September 1944, and the second one - after it. The main characters are Nikola Deyanov, played by Stefan Danailov and Dimitar Bombov, nicknamed "Mitko Bombata" (Mitko the Bomb), played by Grigor Vachkov. They are childhood friends, both communists, spies, and partisans.

Among the writers of the film are Pavel Vezhinov, and the poet and dissident Georgi Markov. Directors of the series are Lyubomir Sharlandjiev and Nedelcho Chernev. The production was funded by the ruling Bulgarian Communist Party and is dedicated to the 25th anniversary of the coup of 9 September 1944 coup d'état, presented as a popular anti-fascist uprising.

== Cambodian release ==
Bayon Television was released by 2016. It was Khmer dubbed version voiced by the Cambodians (its title in Cambodian was រាល់គីឡូម៉ែត្រ). The series was released only in Phnom Penh, Cambodia and Vietnam under VTV Vietnam.
