= Petia Miladinova =

Bulgarian actress (born 1962)

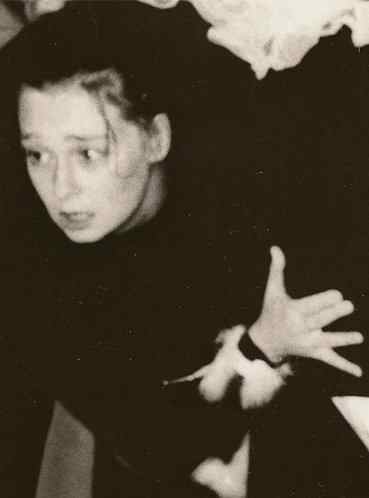
- Born: January 10, 1962 (age 64); Sofia, Bulgaria

Petia Lyubomirova Miladinova (born January 10, 1962) is a Bulgarian actress.

== Early life ==
She comes from a family of actors. Her father is the actor Lyubomir Miladinov, known for his act as the black captain in "Na vseky kilometur" (On every mile), and her mother is the actress Nadya Savova. Petia graduated NATFIZ (National Academy of Theater and Film Arts in Sofia, Bulgaria) as an actress.

== Acting career ==
She played in a theater in Shumen and also for about two years in Haskovo. Later on she started acting in the "Tears and Laughter" theatre. She is acofounder of the "Dialogue" theater. She has played in "Thessaloniki conspirators," "In the Moon Room", "Confusion", "That's absurd," "The Importance of Being Earnest", etc. and participated in numerous theatrical performances of festival projects in countries of Europe such as Hungary (Budapest and Szeged), Georgia, Uzbekistan (Tashkent), Russia (Yaroslavl) Italy (Urbino and Rome), France (Avignon) and Romania (Iași).

== Voice acting career ==
Miladinova deals with dubbing films and TV shows. Her first dubbing job was on Russian animated series (she was six years old then). Later on she also dubbed the same movies she acts in. She started dubbing actively after the popular series "Alf". More popular titles with her voice are "Mad About You", "Absolutely Fabulous", "Babylon 5" (second dubbing), "Cybill" (second dubbing) "Doctor Who", "That '70s Show", "Monk" (from season 7), "Two and a Half Men" (from season 2), "Ghost Whisperer" (from season 2), "'Til Death", "Fringe", "Stargate Universe", "Drop Dead Diva", "Suits", and more. Animated series with her participation are "Disney's Adventures of the Gummi Bears" and "Superman: The Animated Series", as well as the second dubbes of "Teen Titans" and "Duck Dodgers".

Actress	Movies / TV Series	Role
Anna Torv	Mistresses; Fringe	Alex; Olivia Dunham
Juliette Lewis	Natural Born Killers; The Firm	Malary Knox Tammy Hemphill
Lea Thompson	Back to the Future Back to the Future 2 Back to the Future 3	Lorraine McLean Lorraine McFlai Maggie McFly / Lorraine McFly
Lindsay Lohan	That '70s Show; Vacation	Daniel; Herself
Eypril Bolby	Two and a Half Men; Fallen from the sky	Kimber / Candy Stacey Barrett
Gina Torres	Fallen from the sky Skirts	Diana Hall Jessica Pearson
Kelly Stables	Til Death; Two and a Half Men (seasons 7 & 8)	Sandi Melisa

== Other activities ==
In 2000 she teaches Acting in the private school "Tour défors". She is the author and performer of a performance on The First Theoretical Lecture on History of the Ancient Theater .

Miladinova also deals with writing poems. Some of her poems "If Someone Dies" were released on Radio Free Europe in the late 1980s, and some of them were published in The Literary Journal.

He wrote the children's book "Fairy Riddles", which was published in 2003. Later, she performed a performance of the same name with the play of Jana Dobreva based on the booklet.

In 2004 she teaches at the Private Theater School for "Children Deprived of Parental Care" at the House "P. Slaveykov ".

== Awards and nominations ==
She took a special part in the book "The Magic City" by Kiril Milchev, who received the 2001 Independent Writers Association Award.

In 2002, she received a second prize for a screenplay competition "Studio on the Fifth Floor" in the category Situational Comedy, organized by the National Film Center and the Dolly Media Studio.

In 2003 her play "Flower Hill" was nominated for the National Drama Competition "Ivan Radoev" and was selected in the Dramaturgy section of the Drumevi Fests Festival. Later in 2009 and 2010, Colorful Hill was ranked third in the National Film Center competition in the animation section.

Miladinova is included in Anthology Writing actors "Written in Antract" in 1998, as well as in Almanac "Irin Pirin" in 2003.

In 2011, Miladinova was awarded the National Drama Award for the Mikhail Lakatnik Puppet Theater Festival - Yambol for the play "Feng and the Sky Dragon".

That same year the play "The Papyrus of Tot" was nominated for a competition for child radio broadcast at BNR "Hristo Botev".

== Personal life ==
She has one son – Branimir Miladinov. In her spare time Petia takes care of several tropical birds called gouldian finches.

== Film and TV appearances ==
Year	Movie	Director
1987	The 13th Princess's Bride	Ivanka Grivcheva
1985	At night with white horses	Zac Heskey
1985	Boris I	Borislav Sharaliev
1983	Where you live?	Gencho Genchev
1982	The Heaviest Sin	Ivanka Grivcheva
1976	Notes on the Bulgarian uprisings	Georgi Branev Veselin Branev
1974	Life and death	Nedelcho Chernev
1974	Exams at no time	Ivanka Grivcheva
1973	Children play out	Ivanka Grivcheva
1971	Gerlova history	Grisha Ostrovsky
1969	The iconostasis	Hristo Hristov Todor Dinov
—	Give one fire	—
—	Four hours of singing (two parts)	—
—	Birthday	—

== Theater appearances ==
- "The Thessaloniki Consul" by Georgi Danailov
- "Viewpoint" by Vasily Shuxhin
- "In the Moon Room" by Valeri Petrov
- The Squid by Nicolas Erdman
- "Sumathoha" by Yordan Radichkov
- "This one who gets slapped" by Leonid Andreev
- "Euphonal Wedding" by Bertolt Brecht
- "Bing"
- "Bit" by Ivan Hadjiyski
- "This is absurd" by Ivan Kulekov
- "Gonzago's murder" by Nedyalko Yordanov
- "How Important to Be Serious" by Oscar Wilde
- "Trample Desire " by Tennessee Williams
- "Cinderella" by M. Minkov
- "Vishneva Garden" by Anton Chekhov

=== Plays, recorded in a Theater Author ===
Play	Notes
The colorful hill	Nomination of the National Competition for Dramaturgy "Ivan Radoev" Selection of the national competition for drama "Drumevi festivals" Two consecutive years third place in the animation competition of the National Film Center
Vampire Bride	Adaptation for puppet theater together with the director Todor Valov. Since 2010, she has been playing at the Sofia Puppet Theater.
Bratimir	Tale of children and adults.
By Pa's Will	Forbidden for children up to 13 years of age
Toth's Papyrus	A fairy tale for Egyptian children, nominated for a radio contest in 2011. It was performed in July 2012 under the program Hristo Botev directed by Georgi Mihalkov.
Kikibok and the Sun's daughter	Fairy tale for children with African motives. Done in July 2012 for the Children's Play for Children Festival from the Children's School to the New Drama Theater " Salza and laughter " directed by Emil Emilov.
Feng and the Heavenly Dragon	A tale for children with Chinese motives. Realized by the State Puppet Theater Targovishte in May 2012 with director Ivaylo Markov. National Prize for Dramaturgy at the Mihail Lakatnik Puppet Theater Festival, 2011
