= The Barrier (1979 film) =

1979 film

- Directed by: Christo Christov
- Written by: Pavel Vezhinov
- Produced by: Kiril S. Kirov
- Starring: Innokentiy Smoktunovskiy
- Cinematography: Atanas Tasev
- Release dates: August 1979 (Moscow); 11 November 1979 (Bulgaria)
- Running time: 114 minutes
- Country: Bulgaria
- Language: Bulgarian

The Barrier (Bulgarian: Бариерата, translit. Barierata) is a 1979 Bulgarian drama film directed by Christo Christov. It was entered into the 11th Moscow International Film Festival where it won the Silver Prize. The film was selected as the Bulgarian entry for the Best Foreign Language Film at the 52nd Academy Awards, but was not accepted as a nominee.

== Cast ==
- Innokentiy Smoktunovskiy as Antoni Manev
- Vania Tzvetkova as Doroteya
- Yevgeniya Barakova as Saprugata
- Maria Dimcheva as D-r Yurukova
- Ivan Kondov as Sledovatelyat
- Roumiania Parvanova as Mashtehata

== See also ==
- List of submissions to the 52nd Academy Awards for Best Foreign Language Film
- List of Bulgarian submissions for the Academy Award for Best Foreign Language Film
