= Todorka Bakardzhieva =

Bulgarian actress

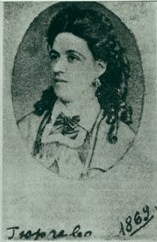
Todorka Bakardzhieva (cropped)

Todorka Bakardzhieva (c. 1850–1934) was a Bulgarian actress and a known revolutionary. She was an actor in the company of Dobri Voynikov. She was a member of the Bulgarian Revolutionary Central Committee and active in its service during the Russo-Turkish War (1877–1878).
