= Claudio Caligari =

Italian film director and screenwriter

- Born: 7 February 1948; Arona, Piedmont, Italy
- Died: 26 May 2015 (aged 67); Rome, Italy
- Occupation: Director

Claudio Caligari (7 February 1948 – 26 May 2015) was an Italian director and screenwriter.

== Life and career ==
Born in Arona, Piedmont, Caligari began his career as a documentarist, often collaborating with Franco Barbero; his first work was Perché droga (1975). He made his feature film debut in 1983, with the drug-centered drama Toxic Love, which won the De Sica Award at the 40th Venice International Film Festival. Only fifteen years later he directed another work, the neo-noir The Scent of the Night. He completed the editing of his third and last film, Non essere cattivo, a few days before his death from a tumour.

== Filmography ==
Director and Writer

- Lotte nel Belice (1977)
- Toxic Love (Amore tossico) (1983)
- The Scent of the Night (L'odore della notte) (1998)
- Don't Be Bad (Non essere cattivo) (2015)
