= S.O.S. Noronha =

1957 film

- Directed by: Georges Rouquier
- Written by: Pierre Boileau
- Produced by: Cila Films
- Starring: Jean Marais; Daniel Ivernel
- Music by: Jean-Jacques Grünenwald, José Padilla
- Release date: 21 June 1957 (France)
- Running time: 100 minutes
- Countries: France, Italy, West Germany
- Language: French
- Box office: 957,961 admissions (France)

S.O.S. Noronha is a French adventure film from 1957, directed by Georges Rouquier, written by Pierre Boileau, starring Jean Marais. The scenario was based on a novel of Pierre Viré.

== Cast ==
- Jean Marais: Frédéric Coulibaud
- Daniel Ivernel: Mastic
- Yves Massard: Froment
- Vanja Orico: Vanja
- José Lewgoy: Pratinho
- Ruy Guerra: Miguel
- Altit: Santaremi
- Mario Bernardi: Le gouverneur
- Alina de Lima: La femme du gouverneur
