= First Name: Carmen =

1983 film by Jean-Luc Godard

- Theatrical release poster
- French: Prénom Carmen
- Directed by: Jean-Luc Godard
- Screenplay by: Anne-Marie Miéville
- Produced by: Alain Sarde
- Starring: Maruschka Detmers; Jacques Bonnaffé; Myriem Roussel; Christophe Odent
- Cinematography: Raoul Coutard; Jean-Bernard Menoud
- Edited by: Fabienne Alvarez-Giro; Suzanne Lang-Willar
- Music by: Beethoven
- Production companies: Sara Films; JLG Films; Films A2
- Distributed by: Parafrance
- Release dates: 8 September 1983 (Venice); 11 January 1984 (France)
- Running time: 85 minutes
- Country: France
- Language: French
- Box office: $3 million

First Name: Carmen (French: Prénom Carmen) is a 1983 French film directed by Jean-Luc Godard. Loosely based on Bizet's opera Carmen, the film was written by Anne-Marie Miéville and produced by Alain Sarde, and stars Maruschka Detmers and Jacques Bonnaffé. The film won the Golden Lion at the 40th Venice International Film Festival and had 395,462 admissions in France.

== Plot ==
Carmen, in a voice over paired with shots of the city and the sea, introduces herself as "the girl who should not be called Carmen." Somewhere a string quartet is rehearsing the late string quartets of Beethoven. The eccentric Jeannot (played by Godard) is living in a sanitarium where the doctor threatens to throw him out if he doesn't start to show signs of real illness. Carmen comes to visit him, and it is revealed he is a washed-up filmmaker and her lecherous uncle. After getting her Uncle Jeannot to loan her his seaside apartment, Carmen and some others attempt to rob a bank.

During the mayhem of the robbery, Carmen comes face to face with Joseph, a comically inept bank guard, and the two immediately fall in love. The string quartet continues to rehearse, inflecting the scenes of the robbery, and vice versa. The narrative link is that one of the members of the quartet is Claire, who is established earlier in the film as a potential love interest for Joseph.

Carmen and Joseph retreat to Uncle Jeannot's apartment, where Carmen recalls childhood incestuous encounters. Carmen tells Joseph, quoting from Carmen Jones: "if I love you, that's the end of you." Joseph is arrested and put on trial, and Carmen escapes with Fred, the leader of her gang. In flashback, Carmen reveals to Joseph that the robbery was intended to fund a larger project, the kidnapping of "a big manufacturer" or his daughter, with a fake film directed by Uncle Jeannot meant to provide cover, a scheme that John Dillinger supposedly once perpetrated. Joseph is acquitted with the help of an impassioned public defender and Claire's moral support.

Meanwhile, Fred persuades Uncle Jeannot to direct the gang's film. After receiving a rose from her during the trial, Joseph reunites with Carmen at a hotel where the gang is staying. He plans to renew their relationship and to participate in the kidnapping, but Carmen seems increasingly uninterested in him, and the gang ostracizes Joseph. Things go from bad to worse for Joseph as Carmen toys with a young hotel attendant, Fred directs Carmen to tell Joseph it's over, and Joseph forces Carmen into an abject sexual encounter in the shower where he ejaculates on her.

The day of the kidnapping arrives, and the incident is to take place in the restaurant in the hotel where the gang has been staying. Uncle Jeannot is present to direct the film (apparently shot on video), along with the string quartet (performing in public at last) and eventually the police (who have followed Joseph). As with the bank robbery, mayhem ensues.

Joseph is determined to encounter Carmen alone; a gun goes off between them, and Carmen falls to the floor. Leaving her for dead, the police drag Joseph away. In a stupor, Carmen asks the young hotel attendant what it is called when the innocents are on one side and the guilty on the other, when everything has been lost but you are still breathing and the sun is still rising. "Daybreak," he responds.

== Cast ==
- Maruschka Detmers as Carmen X
- Jacques Bonnaffé as Joseph Bonnaffé
- Myriem Roussel as Claire
- Christophe Odent as the chef
- Hippolyte Girardot as Fred

Isabelle Adjani was originally cast in the title role, but she left the set after a few days of filming to be with her dying father. It was producer Alain Sarde who brought Maruschka Detmers, a 20-year-old Dutch girl, to the attention of Godard, just out of an acting class and without any film experience behind her. Godard accepted, persuaded both by the perfectly fitting physical type to give life to the sensual and melancholy Carmen, and by the ease with which she faced, during an audition, a nude scene in the presence of the male protagonist.
