= Toxic Love =

- Directed by: Claudio Caligari
- Written by: Claudio Caligari; Guido Blumir
- Produced by: Giorgio Nocella
- Starring: Cesare Ferretti; Michela Mioni
- Cinematography: Dario Di Palma
- Edited by: Enzo Meniconi
- Music by: Detto Mariano
- Release date: 1983
- Country: Italy
- Language: Italian

Toxic Love (Italian: Amore tossico) is a 1983 Italian drama film directed by Claudio Caligari. The film depicts a realistic and graphic portrayal of the heroin addiction that afflicted many young drifters in the eighties. The cast was entirely made of amateur actors, of whom most were or had been drug addicts.

The film premiered at the 40th Venice International Film Festival, in which it won the De Sica Award. It was also screened at the San Sebastián International Film Festival, in which Michela Mioni was awarded best actress.

== Plot ==
Cesare, Enzo and Ciopper are a group of heroin addicts whose main occupation is to find money for their daily fix. Cesare hopes that his girlfriend, Michela, would help them but she has already bought drugs on her own from Teresa, a prostitute in Ostia, and the two have an argument. Cesare, Ciopper and Enzo eventually manage to score from a local pusher, nicknamed Dartagnan. When Michela test Teresa's heroin, and finds out that she's been ripped off, she tries to convince Cesare to get her money back. Cesare reluctantly agreed on confronting Teresa, but her pimp steps in and protects her. The next day, Michela, Cesare, Ciopper and Enzo take the train to Rome, to go to a methadone clinic. Here they meet a group of friends, including Donna, a transvestite, her boyfriend Debora, and Massimo, a fellow heroin-addict who has just been released from prison. Massimo talks Cesare into the idea of sticking up a local shop, but the results are poor, and Cesare lets Massimo taking all the money so that he can score. Meanwhile, Enzo meets a local pusher, Mario, who is looking for a young heroin-addicted girl he is smitten with called Loredana. Taking advantage of Mario's temporal vulnerability, Enzo manages to get four heroin doses with the promise of selling them and give Mario the profits, but eventually he shoots them all himself. The next day the group pay a visit to Patrizia, a local artist who is willing to share her stash, and they all do drugs in her studio. During the course of the night Cesare and Michela break away from the group and return to Ostia. Unsatisfied with their life, they talk about their future and agree on kicking their addiction. To celebrate, they shoot dope for one last time, this time cocaine, but Michela unexpectedly overdoses. Cesare rushes her to the hospital, and consumed by guilt and anxiety, returns to the beach and shoots the rest of their drugs before frantically running back to the emergency room where a doctor is trying to save Michela. A police car spots him and intimates him to stop, but as he refuses, they shoot him. The film ends with a series of flashbacks of Enzo, Michela and Cesare's initiation to drugs as teenagers.

== Cast ==
- Cesare Ferretti as Cesare
- Michela Mioni as Michela
- Enzo Di Benedetto as Enzo
- Roberto Stani as Roberto aka Ciopper
- Loredana Ferrara as Loredana
- Fernando Arcangeli as Debora
- Gianni Schettino as Donna
- Mario Afeltra as Mariuccio
- Clara Memoria as Teresa
- Patrizia Vicinelli as Patrizia

== Release ==
In October 2025, the film was screened as 'A Tribute to Claudio Caligari' at the 20th Rome Film Festival.

== See also ==
- List of Italian films of 1983
