= Torrid Noon =

1965 film

Torrid Noon (Горещо пладне)
- Directed by: Zako Heskija
- Written by: Yordan Radichkov
- Produced by: Ivan Kordov
- Starring: Plamen Nakov
- Cinematography: Todor Stoyanov
- Edited by: Katya Vasileva
- Release dates: 1965 (Cannes); 1966 (Bulgaria)
- Running time: 89 minutes
- Country: Bulgaria
- Language: Bulgarian

Torrid Noon (Bulgarian: Горещо пладне, translit. Goreshto pladne) is a Bulgarian drama film released in 1966, directed by Zako Heskija. It was entered into the 1965 Cannes Film Festival.

== Cast ==
- Plamen Nakov - Aleko
- Peter Slabakov - Generalat
- Grigor Vachkov - Selyanin
- Rousy Chanev - Voynik
- Gerasim Mladenov - Chinovnik
- Vladislav Molerov - Kapitanat
- Kalina Antonova - Devoyka
- Ivan Bratanov - Selyanin
- Dimitar Panov
- Naicho Petrov - Pasazher
- Dora Staeva - Mayka
- Kyamil Kyuchukov
- Lachezar Yankov
- Aszparuh Sarjev
- Lyubomir Kirilov
- Dimitar Manchev
