= Ruzha Delcheva =

Bulgarian actress

Ружа Делчева Ruzha Delcheva
- Ruzha Delcheva in A Dog in a Drawer (1982)
- Born: Ruzha Nikolova Delcheva; August 2, 1915; Stara Zagora, Bulgaria
- Died: November 26, 2002 (aged 87); Sofia, Bulgaria
- Occupations: Film and Theatre Actress
- Years active: 1938–1989
- Spouse: Alexander Tihov

Ruzha Delcheva (Bulgarian: Ружа Делчева, 2 August 1915 – 26 November 2002) was a Bulgarian stage and film actress.

She is probably best known for her memorable performance as Madam Zlata, costarring with Georgi Partsalev in the TV musical The Phoney Civilization (1974) directed by Hacho Boyadzhiev. She is also known for her numerous roles on the stage of the Ivan Vazov National Theatre most notably as Masha in Three Sisters by Anton Chekhov, Kostanda in Mother-in-law by Anton Strashimirov, Regina in The Little Foxes by Lillian Hellman and Beatrice in The Duchess of Padua by Oscar Wilde.

Between 1968 and 1970, Ruzha Delcheva was a chairwoman of The Union of Bulgarian Actors (UBA). In 2000, she was decorated with the high government prize the Order Of The Balkan Mountains.

== Selected filmography ==
Year	Film			Role	Notes
Year	English title	Bulgarian title	Transliteration	Role	Notes
1938	Strahil Voivode	Страхил войвода	Strahil voyvoda	Ivana	short directed by Josip Novak
1940	They Were Victorious	Те победиха	Te pobediha	Rada	
1956	Item One	Точка първа	Tochka parva	the chairwoman	
1957	Years of Love	Години за любов	Godini za lyubov	Maria	
1969	Tzar Ivan Shishman	Цар Иван Шишман	Tzar Ivan Shishman	Teodora Sara	
1974	The Phoney Civilization	Криворазбраната цивилизация	Krivorazbranata tsivilizatsiya	Zlata	TV musical directed by Hacho Boyadzhiev
1982	A Dog in a Drawer	Куче в чекмедже	Kuche v chekmedzhe	Andro's grandmother	
1985	This Fine Age of Maturity	Тази хубава зряла възраст	Tazi hubava zryala vazrast		directed by Hacho Boyadzhiev
