= Hotel Central (film) =

1983 film by Vesselin Branev

- Хотел Централ (Hotel Zentral)
- Directed by: Veselin Branev
- Written by: Veselin Branev
- Starring: Iren Krivoshieva
- Cinematography: Yatsek Todorov
- Edited by: Nadezhda Tzenova
- Music by: Bozhidar Petkov
- Production company: Boyana Film
- Release date: 1983
- Country: Bulgaria
- Language: Bulgarian

Hotel Central (Bulgarian: Хотел Централ, also known as The Central Hotel) is a 1983 Bulgarian film written and directed by Veselin Branev. It premiered at the 40th edition of the Venice Film Festival to large critical acclaim. The film is based on two short stories of Georgi Kostantinov.

== Plot ==
Set on the eve of the 1934 coup d'état, the film tells the parallel stories of the chambermaid Tinka, who is forced to prostitution, and of a stage company led by Tinka's idol.

== Cast ==
- Iren Krivoshieva as Tinka
- Zhivko Garvanov as Aptekaryat Yonchev
- Valentin Gadzhokov as Stefo
- Boryana Puncheva as Lencheto
- Anton Radichev as Stavri
- Stoyan Stoev as Benyo
