= Love in a Hot Climate =

1954 film

- Directed by: Georges Rouquier; Ricardo Muñoz Suay
- Written by: Michel Audiard; Maurice Barry; Luis García Berlanga; Ricardo Muñoz Suay; Joseph Peyré
- Produced by: Jacques Bar; Ignace Morgenstern; Joaquín Reig
- Starring: Christine Carère
- Cinematography: Maurice Barry
- Edited by: Christian Gaudin
- Music by: Raymond Legrand
- Distributed by: Cocinor
- Release date: 14 May 1954
- Running time: 99 minutes
- Countries: France; Spain
- Languages: French; Spanish

Love in a Hot Climate (Spanish: Sangre y luces, French: Sang et lumières) is a 1954 Spanish-French drama film directed by Georges Rouquier and Ricardo Muñoz Suay. It was entered into the 1954 Cannes Film Festival.

== Cast ==
- Manuel Aguilera
- Léandre Alpirente
- Rafael Arcos - Paco
- Julia Caba Alba - La tante de Pili
- Christine Carère - Pili
- Mercedes Cora - La Comtesse
- Eugenio Domingo - Federico
- Jacques Dufilho - Chispa
- Félix Fernández - El Chato
- Arnoldo Foà - Riera
- Zsa Zsa Gabor - Marilena
- Daniel Gélin - Ricardo Garcia
- José Guardiola - Manuel
- Manuel Guitián
- Casimiro Hurtado
- Arturo Marín
- Chantal Retz
- Emilio Ruiz de Córdoba
- Emilio Santiago
- José Sepúlveda
- Rico Sevillanito
- Juan Vázquez
- Florence Vernet
- Henri Vilbert - Noguera
- Manuel Zarzo - Nino de Triana
