= A Dog in a Drawer =

Куче в чекмедже Kuche v chekmedzhe A Dog in a Drawer
- Directed by: Dimitar Petrov
- Written by: Rada Moskova
- Starring: Veselin Prahov; Martin Stoyanov; Ruzha Delcheva; Zhivko Garvanov
- Cinematography: Atanas Tasev
- Music by: Boris Karadimchev
- Production companies: Boyana, a Film Unite Mladost
- Release date: 1982
- Running time: 86 minutes
- Country: Bulgaria
- Language: Bulgarian

A Dog in a Drawer (Bulgarian: Куче в чекмедже / Kuche v chekmedzhe) is a Bulgarian comedy-drama film released in 1982, directed by Dimitar Petrov, starring Veselin Prahov, Martin Stoyanov and Ruzha Delcheva.

This is the first of a series of hit movies starring the child actor Veselin Prahov which turned him into a star of the Bulgarian cinema from the 1980s. A Dog in a Drawer successfully carries on the popular in Bulgaria "Childhood genre", developed in the 1970s by Mormarevi Brothers together with the present director Dimitar Petrov. The film won first prize at the “Varna Film Fest 1982” as well as an award from the “Union of the Bulgarian Writers” for the screenplay by Rada Moskova who is also the writer of the next in the series On the Top of the Cherry Tree (1984).

== Cast ==
In the roles of the children are:

- Veselin Prahov as Dimitar Mitashki
- Martin Stoyanov as Andro
- Emil Dimitrov as Stefo
- Lyudmila Filipova
- Evgeniya Genova
- Aleksandrina Pendichanska
- Rositsa Stoycheva
- Ani Petrova

In the roles of the adults are:

- Ruzha Delcheva as Andro's grandmother
- Zhivko Garvanov as Stefo's father
- Stefan Iliev as Mitashki's father
- Ivan Yanchev as Mitashki's grandfather
- Pavel Popandov as a dog trader, the bad guy
- Aneta Sotirova as Andro's mother
- Maria Kavardzhikova
- Nadya Todorova as Dacheva
