= The Last Summer (1974 film) =

1974 film

- Directed by: Christo Christov
- Written by: Yordan Radichkov
- Starring: Grigor Vachkov
- Cinematography: Tzvetan Chobanski
- Release date: 10 May 1974
- Running time: 86 minutes
- Country: Bulgaria
- Language: Bulgarian

The Last Summer (Bulgarian: Последно лято, translit. Posledno lyato) is a 1974 Bulgarian drama film directed by Christo Christov. It was selected as the Bulgarian entry for the Best Foreign Language Film at the 47th Academy Awards, but was not accepted as a nominee.

== Cast ==
- Grigor Vachkov as Ivan Efreytorov
- Dimitar Ikonomov as Dinko
- Bogdan Spasov as Dyadoto
- Vesko Zehirev as Vuychoto
- Lili Metodieva as Maykata
- Daniela Danailova as Karakachankata
- Lyuben Boyadzhiev as Generalat
- Yuli Toshev as Majorat
- Peter Goranov as Partizaninat
- Dimitar Milanov as Dyavolat

== See also ==
- List of submissions to the 47th Academy Awards for Best Foreign Language Film
- List of Bulgarian submissions for the Academy Award for Best Foreign Language Film
