= Biquefarre =

- Directed by: Georges Rouquier
- Produced by: Bertrand Van Effenterre
- Cinematography: André Villard
- Music by: Yves Gilbert
- Release date: 1983
- Country: France
- Language: French

Biquefarre is a 1983 French docufiction film, written and directed by Georges Rouquier, about the uncertain future facing a small farm in Aveyron. The film revisits characters first documented by Rouquier in his 1947 film Farrebique.

The film entered the competition at the 40th Venice International Film Festival, where it received the Special Jury Prize.

== Cast ==
- Henri Rouquier : Henri
- Maria Rouquier : Maria
- Roger Malet : Raoul
- Marius Benaben : Lucien
- André Benaben : Marcel
