= Cyclops (1976 film) =

1976 film

- Directed by: Khristo Khristov
- Written by: Khristo Khristov
- Story by: Gencho Stoyev (novel)
- Produced by: Kiril S. Kirov
- Starring: Mikhail Mutafov
- Cinematography: Venets Dimitrov
- Music by: Kiril Tsibulka
- Release date: 26 November 1976
- Running time: 96 minutes
- Country: Bulgaria
- Language: Bulgarian

Cyclops (Bulgarian: Циклопът, translit. Tsiklopŭt) is a 1976 Bulgarian drama film directed by Khristo Khristov. It was entered into the 27th Berlin International Film Festival.

== Cast ==
- Mikhail Mutafov - Edi, komandirŭt
- Nevena Kokanova - Zoya
- Penka Tsitselkova - Maria
- Nikola Dadov - Bashtata na Edi
- Penko Penkov - Pomoshtnik komandirŭt
- Pavel Poppandov - Starshinata akustik
- Ivan Yordanov
- Zinka Drumeva
- Virdzhiniya Kirova
- Kiran Kolarov
- Ognyan Gilinov
