= Dawn Over the Drava =

- Directed by: Zako Heskiya
- Screenplay by: Pavel Vezhinov; Rangel Ignatov
- Produced by: Nikola Vulchev
- Starring: Georgi Georgiev-Getz; Georgi Cherkelov; Peter Slabakov
- Cinematography: Krum Krumov
- Edited by: Dimitrichka Zlateva
- Music by: Simeon Pironkov
- Production company: Nu Boyana Film Studios
- Release date: March 15, 1974
- Running time: 161 minutes
- Country: Bulgaria
- Language: Bulgarian

Dawn Over the Drava (Bulgarian: Зарево над Драва, romanized: Zarevo nad Drava) is a Bulgarian war-drama film from 1974, directed by Zako Heskiya.

== Plot ==
After the 1944 Bulgarian coup d'état the political prisoner Boyan Vassilev is freed from prison. He is appointed as political officer in the Bulgarian Army, fighting Nazi Germany in Yugoslavia and Hungary. On the banks of the Drava the Bulgarian Army stopped the last major German offensive of World War II.

== Cast ==
- Georgi Georgiev-Getz as Boyan Vassilev
- Georgi Cherkelov as Colonel Demirev
- Peter Slabakov as Delcho
- Stoyan Gadev as big man
- Stefan Danailov as Lieutenant Bozhev

== Awards ==
- Golden Rose Bulgarian Feature Film Festival (1974):
  - Best Film
  - Best Actor — Georgi Georgiev-Getz, Georgi Cherkelov
  - Best Screenplay — Pavel Vezhinov, Rangel Ignatov
  - Best Cinematography — Krum Krumov
- Screenplay Award of Union of Bulgarian Writers (1974):
  - Pavel Vezhinov, Rangel Ignatov
