= Grigor Vachkov =

Bulgarian actor (1932–1980)

Grigor Vachkov Григор Вачков
- Grigor Vachkov in the film Against the Wind (1977)
- Born: Grigor Vachkov Grigorov; 26 May 1932; Tranchovitsa, Levski Municipality, Bulgaria
- Died: 18 March 1980 (aged 47); Sofia, Bulgaria
- Occupations: Film and Theatre Actor
- Years active: 1955–1980

Grigor Vachkov, often called Grishata (Bulgarian: Григор Вачков - Гришата; 26 May 1932 – 18 March 1980) was a Bulgarian theater and film actor, honored with the award of "People's actor" in the People's Republic of Bulgaria. He had more than 41 appearances and leading roles in the Bulgarian cinema.

Vachkov got a broad popularity after the role of Mitko the Bomb in the TV series At Each Kilometer (1969–71). Despite his death in 1980, he remains as one of the leading actors in the history of the Bulgarian cinematography of that time. During the 1960s and 1970s, Vachkov starred in classic film productions as Torrid Noon (1965), The Tied Up Balloon (1967) both written by Yordan Radichkov, Whale (1970) directed by Petar B. Vasilev, The Kindest Person I Know (1973), The Last Summer (1974) also written by Radichkov, Almost a Love Story (1980), The Truck (1980) and especially his role as Banko in Manly Times (1977) directed by Eduard Zahariev. Vachkov is also known for his numerous appearances on the stage of the Satirical Theatre „Aleko Konstantinov“, Sofia.

== Biography and career ==
He was born as Grigor Vachkov Grigorov on 26 May 1932 in the village of Tranchovitsa, Levski Municipality, Bulgaria. In 1955 he graduated from the Krastyo Sarafov National Academy for Theatre and Film Arts. After the graduation, Vachkov was appointed in the Vratsa Theatre for two years. In 1957 he joined the troupe of the newly founded Satirical Theatre „Aleko Konstantinov“ in Sofia. His debut in films came in 1960. The TV series Every Kilometer (1969–71), where he plays the role of Mitko the Bomb, brought him a wide popularity. Vachkov took part in films that gained international success such as The Last Summer (1974) and Manly Times (1977). His last film was Mera spored Mera. He died at the beginning of shooting and the script had to be changed so that the film could be finished.

He is the father of the actress Martina Vachkova and was a good friend of the writer Yordan Radichkov.

== Partial filmography ==
- Sterne (1959) - Montyor v rabotilnitzata (Repair-man)
- Dom na dve ulitzi (1960) - Guni Hunata
- Hitar Petar (1960)
- Bednata ulitza (1960)
- Prizori (1961)
- Hronika na chuvstvata (1962) - Iliycho
- Tyutyun (1962)
- Smart nyama (1963) - Pesho
- Neprimirimite (1964) - Vaklin
- Verigata (1964) - Karutzaryat
- Neveroyatna istoriya (1964) - Shofyorat (The Driver)
- Antike Münze, Die (1965) - Boncho
- Goreshto pladne (1965) - Selyanin (A peasant)
- Dzhesi Dzeyms sreshtu Lokum Shekerov (1966) - Lokum Shekerov
- Privarzaniyat balon (1967) - Chovekat s pishtova (Man with gun)
- Gibelta na Aleksander Veliki (1968) - Aleksander Karev
- Byalata staya (1968) - Kloun
- Man of La Mancha (1968, TV musical)
- Tango (1969) - Ilyo Mitovski
- Beliyat kon (1969, Short) - Dzheri
- Na vseki kilometar (1969, TV Series) - Mitko 'Bombata'
- Kit (1970) - Kapitanat
- Knyazat (1970) - Zografat
- Na vseki kilometar — II (1971, TV Series) - Mitko Bombata
- Byagstvo v Ropotamo (1973) - Yusuf
- Nay — dobriyat chovek, kogoto poznavam (1973) - Semo Vlachkov
- Vetchni vremena (1974) - Gunchev
- Posledno lyato (1974) - Ivan Efreytorov
- Selkor (1974) - Mangafata
- Spomen za bliznachkata (1976) - Parvan
- Mazhki vremena'(1977) - Banko
- Sreshtu vyatara (1977) - Kapitan vtori rang Grigorov
- Utroto e nepovtorimo (1978) - Michev
- Pokriv (1978) - Murgaviya
- Vsichki i nikoy (1978) - Mustafa
- Instrument li e gaydata? (1978) - Popat
- Toplo (1978) - Maystor
- Yumrutzi v prastta (1980) - Birnikat Tasho
- Pochti lyubovna istoriya (1980) - Parushev
- Trite smurtni gryaha (1980) - Mitar
- Vazdushniyat chovek (1980) - Bay Foti
- Kamionat (1980) - Dedleto
- Mera spored mera (1981) - Apostol voevoda
- Mera spored mera (1988, TV Series) - Apostol Petkov Enidzhevardarskoto Sontze (final appearance)
