= The Scent of the Night (film) =

- Directed by: Claudio Caligari
- Written by: Claudio Caligari; Dido Sacchettoni
- Starring: Valerio Mastandrea
- Cinematography: Maurizio Calvesi
- Music by: Pivio and Aldo De Scalzi
- Release date: 1998
- Country: Italy
- Language: Italian

The Scent of the Night (Italian: L'odore della notte) is a 1998 Italian crime-drama film directed by Claudio Caligari. It is loosely based on the novel Le notti di arancia meccanica by Dido Sacchettoni.

The film premiered at the 1998 Venice Film Festival. It was nominated for three Nastro d'Argento Awards.

== Cast ==
- Valerio Mastandrea: Remo Guerra
- Marco Giallini: Maurizio Leggeri
- Giorgio Tirabassi: Roberto Salvo
- Alessia Fugardi: Rita
- Franca Scagnetti: maid
- Little Tony: himself

== Release ==
In October 2025, the film was screened as 'A Tribute to Claudio Caligari' at the 20th Rome Film Festival.

== See also ==
- List of Italian films of 1998
