= Anya Pencheva =

Bulgarian actress

Anya Angelova Pencheva
- Born: 12 September 1957 (age 68); Smolyan, Bulgaria
- Occupation: Actress
- Years active: 1969-present

Anya Pencheva (Bulgarian: Аня Пенчева; born 12 September 1957) is a Bulgarian actress.

== Biography ==
She was born in Smolyan, but soon after that her family relocated to Troyan. Pencheva has performed on numerous occasions in the youth theater (Bulgarian: Младежки театър), which she describes as the best years in her life.

Pencheva has been married twice - to sports journalist Sasho Dikov and Ivaylo Karanyotov.
