= Yordan Radichkov =

Bulgarian writer and playwright

- Born: Yordan Dimitrov Radichkov; 24 October 1929; Kalimanitza, Montana region, Bulgaria
- Died: 21 January 2004 (aged 74); Sofia, Bulgaria
- Occupations: Writer, playwright

Yordan Dimitrov Radichkov (Bulgarian: Йордан Радичков; 24 October 1929 – 21 January 2004) was a Bulgarian writer and playwright.

Literary critics Adelina Angusheva and Galin Tihanov called him "arguably the most significant voice of Bulgarian literature in the last third of the 20th century". Some literary critics have referred to him as the Bulgarian Kafka or Gogol. Radichkov is widely known for his numerous short stories, novels and plays. He is also known for the screenplays of the Bulgarian film classics Torrid Noon (1966) directed by Zako Heskiya, The Tied Up Balloon (1967) and The Last Summer (1974).

In 2000, Radichkov was decorated with the high government prize the Order of the Balkan Mountains. In 2007, a monument dedicated to him was officially opened at the garden of the former Royal Palace, nowadays National Art Gallery in Sofia city centre.

== Early life ==
He was born as Yordan Dimitrov Radichkov on 24 October 1929 in a poor family in the village of Kalimanitza, Montana Province, Bulgaria. In 1947, he graduated from the high school in the town of Berkovitsa. Radichkov began his career in 1951 as Vratsa regional correspondent for the Narodna mladezh (National Youth) newspaper and editor (1952–1954) for the same paper. Between 1954 and 1960, he worked as editor for Vecherni Novini (Evening News) paper.

== Writing career ==
Radichkov's literary career began as he started writing short stories for the Vecherni novini (Evening News) newspaper and his early collections caught the attention of readers and critics. In 1959, he published his first full-length book, Sarczeto bie za horata (The Heart Beats for the People), followed by Prosti rutse (Simple Hands, 1961) and Oburnato nebe (A Sky Turned Upside Down, 1962), all written in the socialist-realist official style.

This romantic style was gradually replaced by a style of parody and the grotesque, with an increase in folkloristic elements, including folk fantasy and humor. Radichkov began parodying styles and reality: his works deprived objects of their natural dimensions and took them out of context; he combined disparate genres and transformed reality into a comic theater, defusing absurd aspects of life by means of laughter. A mixture of the fantastic and the real, Radichkov's works combined images of industrial civilisation with those of a remote mythical past, and were sometimes defined as a Balkan magic realism. His parodic style was initially met with animosity from the ruling Communist party (he was often accused of primitivism, escapism and dark agnosticism). Much of his writing (prose and plays) draws on characters and the ethnography of his native North-West Bulgaria. The fact that his own village Kalimaniza was destroyed and it site is currently under the waters of the "Ogosta" dam (1983) became a recurring theme in his writing and another metaphor for the detachedness of the "modern" world from the one to which Radichkov brings his readers in his reminiscings. Another major theme of his writing is nature and wildlife. In his prose he makes a masterful use of the often chaotic and irrational manner villagers and hunters narrate stories. Over the years Radichkov has gained popularity and recognition in Bulgaria and the international community, including a Nobel Prize nomination.

Radichkov's 1966 script for the film Goreshto pladne (Hot Noon) was a story about humanity's efforts to save a trapped boy from drowning in a surging river and was a huge success for the writer. Baruten bukvar (Gunpowder Primer), his 1969 novel, was the first in his homeland to talk about socialism through a powerful blend of profanity, fantasy and folkloric wisdom rather than simple idealization. The award-winning Posledno liato (The Last Summer, 1974) is a parable of a man trying desperately to stay faithful to his own identity in a dynamically changing world.

He also wrote a number of domestically and internationally acclaimed children's books. Of these Nie Vrabchetata (We, the Sparrows) has gained particular popularity in Bulgaria.

Radichkov often illustrated his works with his own abstract drawings that have become another hallmark of his artistic presence.

Radichkov is particularly famous for his language and his use of dialectisms. Critics have stated that "the real main character in the work of Radichkov is the word". Probably the greatest manifestation of Radichkov's impact on Bulgarian culture is the fact that his work introduced a number of neologisms and expressions in the every-day Bulgarian language.

== Awards and public recognition ==
Radichkov has been awarded a wide number of awards for literature, theatre, and film, both in his homeland and abroad, among them the Order of Stara Planina (the highest order of Bulgaria, 2003), a finalist for the Italian Grinzane Cavour Prize (1984) and the prize of the International Academy of the Arts in Paris (1993). A founding member, and first president (1984–1991) of the Bulgarian-Swedish Association for Friendship, he received the Swedish national Order of the Polar Star (1988).

He was a prominent figure in Bulgaria's public life – a member of the Union of Bulgarian Writers since 1962, he was elected MP for the Bulgarian Socialist Party in 2001, but quickly resigned in disagreement and spent the last years of his life increasingly withdrawn from politics.

Radichkov's works have been translated in more than 30 languages and in 2001 he was nominated for the Nobel Prize in Literature.

== Honour ==
Radichkov Peak on Livingston Island in the South Shetland Islands, Antarctica is named after Yordan Radichkov.
