= Emily Spender =

English author

Emily Spender (1841–1922) was an English novelist and suffragist.

== Biography ==
Spender was born in 1841 in Bath, England. She was cousin of the diarist Henry Crabb Robinson and sister-in law of radical publisher William Saunders, who placed her brother Edward Spender into a position as editor of the Western Morning News. She was the great-aunt of Stephen Spender, the British poet.

Spender published her first two novels anonymously, first a conventional novel Son and Heir (1870), and then the feminist novel Restored (Hurst & Blackett, 1871), which was dedicated to Lilias Sophia Hallett the leader of the Bristol society for women's suffrage. Spencer went on to write more novels including Kingsford: A Novel (1866), True Marriage (1878), Until the Day Breaks (1886), and A Soldier for a Day: A Story of the Italian War of Independence (1901).

In 1871 she was the honorary secretary of the Bath committee of the National Society for Women's Suffrage (NSWS). She was also part of the executive committee of the Central committee of the NSWS.

Spender died in 1922.
