= Fleshly School =

The Fleshly School is the name given by Robert Buchanan to a realistic, sensual school of poets, to which Dante Gabriel Rossetti, William Morris, and Algernon Charles Swinburne belonged. He accused them of immorality in an article entitled "The Fleshly School of Poetry" in The Contemporary Review in October 1871. This article was expanded into a pamphlet (1872), but he subsequently withdrew from the criticisms it contained, and it is chiefly remembered by the replies it evoked from Rossetti in a letter to the Athenaeum (December 16, 1871), entitled The Stealthy School of Criticism, and from Swinburne in Under the Microscope (1872).

== See also ==
- Pre-Raphaelite Brotherhood
