= Reference (film) =

1985 film

- Directed by: Christo Christov
- Written by: Alexander Tomov
- Starring: Ivaylo Geraskov
- Cinematography: Atanas Tasev
- Release dates: July 1985 (Moscow); 17 March 1986 (Bulgaria)
- Running time: 96 minutes
- Country: Bulgaria
- Language: Bulgarian

Reference (Bulgarian: Характеристика, translit. Kharakteristika) is a 1985 Bulgarian drama film directed by Christo Christov. It was entered into the 14th Moscow International Film Festival.

== Cast ==
- Ivaylo Geraskov as Paliev
- Itzhak Finzi as Penchev
- Lilyana Kovacheva as Chernoto Meri
- Joreta Nikolova as Lilyana
- Atanass Atanassov as Itzeto
- Plamen Serakov as Petzata
- Vassil Mihajlov as Krushev
- Georgi Kaloyanchev as Bay Luko
