= Dobri Voynikov =

Bulgarian teacher, playwright and journalist

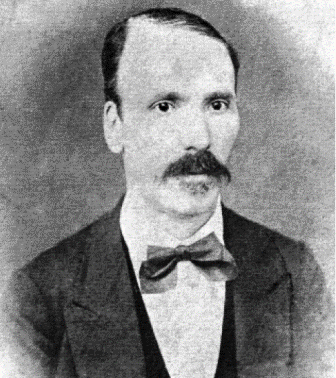
Dobri Voynikov (1833–1878)

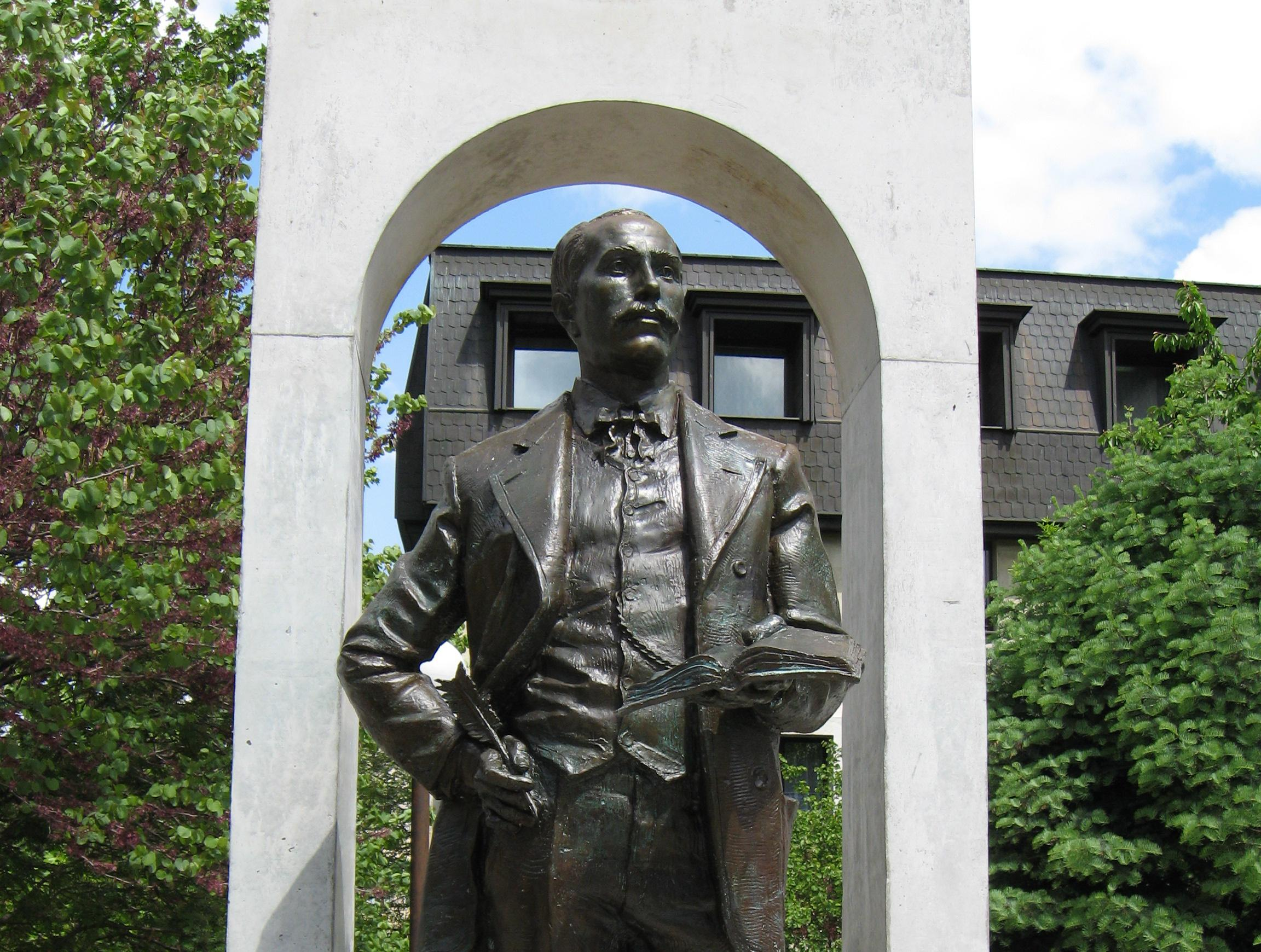
Monument to Voynikov in Shumen

Dobri Popov Voynikov (Bulgarian: Добри Попов Войников; 10 November 1833 – 27 March 1878) was a Bulgarian teacher, playwright and journalist of the Bulgarian National Revival. He is regarded as the father of modern Bulgarian theatre and the first Bulgarian producer. Voynikov was among the founders of the Bulgarian Academy of Sciences.

== Biography ==
Voynikov was born in the city of Şumnu, Ottoman Empire (now Shumen, Bulgaria) in 1833 and studied at Sava Filaterov, Ivan Bogorov and Sava Dobropolodni's schools. He graduated from the Galatasaray High School in Istanbul in 1858 and became a teacher in Shumen, where he remained until 1864. In Shumen, he was an active public figure and took an active part in the Bulgarian Church struggle and the establishment of secular Bulgarian education.

In 1864, he was forced to emigrate to the autonomous Romanian Principalities, settling first in Brăila and then moving to Giurgiu in 1873. In 1866, he was for a while part of the Secret Central Bulgarian Committee. He authored brochures in French, revealing the atrocities committed by the Ottoman authorities in the Bulgarian lands and enlightened the goals of the Bulgarian revolutionary movement. As an émigré in Romania Voynikov came to be involved in theatre: he founded a Bulgarian amateur theatrical company in Brăila in 1865 and headed it until 1870. For the first time in the history of Bulgarian theatre, women took part as actresses. He continued his involvement in theatre in Giurgiu, Bucharest and Shumen.

Voynikov authored several plays, both dramas and comedies: Princess Rayna (1866), Baptism of the Preslav Court (1868), Velislava, Bulgarian Princess (1870), The Enthronement of Krum the Fearsome (1871), the famous The Misunderstood Civilization (1873), The Chorbadzhia (1881), A Physician in Spite of Himself (1884) and the unpublished Dimanka or True First Love. His plays constitute the main repertoire of Bulgarian National Revival theatre and set some trends that were continued by the next generations of playwrights, such as Vasil Drumev and Ivan Vazov.

In the early 1870s Voynikov was close to the right-wing Band of Virtues group who assisted him in obtaining Russian citizenship; thus, Voynikov could return to Bulgaria in 1874. During the Russo-Turkish War of 1877–1878, he was the director of an orphanage in Tarnovo, where he died of typhus.
