= Christo Christov =

Bulgarian film director (1926–2007)

- Born: 11 April 1926; Plovdiv, Bulgaria
- Died: 16 April 2007 (aged 81); Sofia, Bulgaria
- Other name: Hristo Hristov
- Occupations: Film director, screenwriter
- Years active: 1969-1997

Christo Kostov Christov (Bulgarian: Христо Костов Христов; 11 April 1926 – 16 April 2007) was a Bulgarian film director and screenwriter. He directed 19 films between 1969 and 1997.

== Career ==
In 1973, he was a member of the jury at the 8th Moscow International Film Festival. His 1976 film Cyclops was entered into the 27th Berlin International Film Festival. His 1979 film The Barrier won the Silver Prize at the 11th Moscow International Film Festival. In 1981, his film The Truck was entered into the 31st Berlin International Film Festival. His 1985 film Reference was entered into the 14th Moscow International Film Festival.

== Selected filmography ==
- The Last Summer (1974)
- Cyclops (1976)
- The Barrier (1979)
- The Truck (1981)
- Reference (1985)
