= Georgi Mamalev =

Bulgarian actor (born 1952)

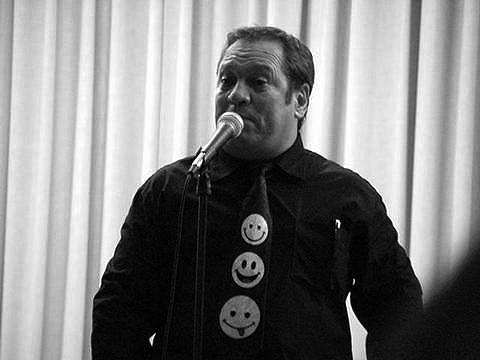
- Georgi Mamalev June 2007
- Born: 5 August 1952 (age 72); Mamarchevo, Yambol Province, Bulgaria
- Occupation: Actor

Georgi Mamalev (Bulgarian: Георги Мамалев; born 5 August 1952) is a Bulgarian actor.

== Career ==
He is one of the founders of the NLO group alongside Velko Kanev and Pavel Popandov.

He has been performing in the Bulgarian national theatre "Ivan Vazov" since 1977. In 2008, Mamalev participated in the Bulgarian show "Dancing stars".

== Personal life ==
Mamalev is married and has two sons.
