= Watch and Ward =

1878 novel by Henry James

- First edition
- Author: Henry James
- Language: English
- Publisher: Houghton, Osgood and Company, Boston
- Publication date: 29 May 1878
- Publication place: United States
- Media type: Print (serial)
- Pages: 219
- Followed by: Roderick Hudson

Watch and Ward is a short novel by Henry James, first published as a serial in The Atlantic Monthly in 1871 and later as a book in 1878. This was James' first novel, though he virtually disowned the book later in life. James later called Roderick Hudson (1875) his first novel instead of Watch and Ward.

== Synopsis ==
Wealthy and leisured Roger Lawrence adopts 12-year-old Nora Lambert after her father kills himself in the hotel room next to Lawrence's. Roger had refused financial assistance to the man, and he feels remorse. Nora is not a pretty child but she soon starts to develop, as does Roger's idea of eventually marrying her.

Unfortunately for Roger, once Nora matures into a beautiful young woman, she is attracted to two other men: worthless George Fenton and the somewhat hypocritical minister, Hubert Lawrence (Roger's cousin). After various adventures Nora winds up in the clutches of Fenton in New York City, but Roger comes to her rescue. Roger and Nora marry in a conventional happy ending.

== Key themes ==
The melodramatic doings in Watch and Ward probably caused James some embarrassment in later years, and it's easy to see why he disowned the book and spoke of Roderick Hudson as his first novel. Still, many critics have pointed out that melodrama always held a certain fascination for James. Watch and Ward is only a particularly gauche example.

James' literary skills are noted to be very unbalanced in the early stages of his career. Nora's development into the beautiful swan from the ugly duckling is told in a prescriptive fashion, and the villain Fenton is considered a very unoriginal character. However, scenes of New York's lower life, and Nora eventual charm, are found to be described well.

A humorous side note is some of the erotic language that James slips into the novel. At one point Roger "caught himself wondering whether, at the worst, a little precursory love-making would do any harm. The ground might be gently tickled to receive his own sowing; the petals of the young girl's nature, playfully forced apart, would leave the golden heart of the flower but the more accessible to his own vertical rays." William James and William Dean Howells were uncomfortable with such imagery, though Henry might have enjoyed their uneasiness.

== Critical evaluation ==
Critics have almost unanimously agreed with James' disowning of Watch and Ward as his first novel in favor of the infinitely more substantial and impressive Roderick Hudson. While Nora gets kudos as a pleasant enough ingénue, the other characters are forgettable and the plot is too often silly.

James did revise Watch and Ward for book publication in 1878, so he wasn't completely ashamed of it at that point in his career. But he dropped the novel from his 1883 collective edition and soon seemed to want to forget about it completely.
