= Secret Central Bulgarian Committee =

Bulgarian organisation (1866–1868)

The Secret Central Bulgarian Committee (Bulgarian: Таен централен български комитет; SCBC) was a Bulgarian revolutionary and political organisation, founded in Bucharest in 1866. It supported a dualist Bulgarian-Ottoman monarchy.

== History ==
The Secret Central Bulgarian Committee was established as a revolutionary organisation in 1866 in Bucharest, by Georgi Rakovski's secretary Ivan Kasabov, under the initiative of the Romanian government. Initially, its agenda was mostly influenced by the politics of the Romanian government, which also supported the organisation. After the abdication of prince Alexandru I. Cuza, the Romanian government was prepared for war against the Ottoman Empire and expected support from a Bulgarian uprising. However, Romanian politics changed after its new government was recognised internationally, thus the organisation lost the support of the government. As a result, in 1867, the SCBC became moderate. It proposed the transformation of the Ottoman Empire into a dual monarchy, in a memorandum sent by a part of the moderate Bulgarian emigrants in Bucharest, to Sultan Abdulaziz. The proposed dual monarchy was similar to the Austro-Hungarian monarchy. A Bulgarian kingdom would be under the sovereignty of the Ottoman Empire. The sultan would be both 'Sultan of the Ottomans' and 'King of the Bulgarians', while the Bulgarian kingdom would be governed by a proxy, a Christian individual to be appointed by the government and approved by the sultan, and the establishment of Eastern Orthodoxy as the official religion of the Bulgarian kingdom. The Ottoman government did not regard the proposal as serious. Midhat Pasha opposed the proposal. The proposal was also criticised by Stoyan Chomakov and Hilarion of Makariopolis for hindering their project to establish the Bulgarian Exarchate. In the same period, SCBC published a pamphlet named Bulgaria in front of Europe, where it also emphasised its dualistic views. In response, Midhat banned the pamphlet. After submitting the memorandum, the SCBC had ended its formal existence. It was only active in publishing the newspaper Narodnost (Nationality). Its newspaper Nationality was funded by the Odessa Board until the anti-Russian views of its editors were discovered. The organisation was not influential among the Bulgarian public, being subject to criticism by right-wingers and left-wingers. The organisation was disbanded in 1868. In the mainstream historiography, SCBC has been regarded as a prelude to the development of the project for Bulgarian independence, which led to the establishment of the Bulgarian Revolutionary Central Committee. Two radical groups emerged from SCBC: "Bulgarian Society" and "Young Bulgaria".
