= Ricardo Muñoz Suay =

Spanish film director

- Born: 28 August 1917; Valencia, Spain
- Died: 2 August 1997 (aged 79); Valencia, Spain
- Occupations: Film director, film producer, screenwriter
- Years active: 1953-1994

Ricardo Muñoz Suay (28 August 1917 – 2 August 1997) was a Spanish film director, producer and screenwriter. He was one of the editors of the film magazine Objetivo which was published from 1953 to 1956. He was a member of the Communist Party.

His film Sang et Lumières (Sangre y Luces) was presented at the 1954 Cannes Film Festival in the feature film category.

The Muñoz Suay Prize was created in 1997 by the Spanish Academia de Cine to award historiography work focused on Spanish cinema.

== Selected filmography ==
- Love in a Hot Climate (1954 - directed)
- The Adventures of Gil Blas (1956)
- The Moment of Truth (1965 - wrote)
- The Night of the Witches (1973 - produced)
