= Nikola Anastasov =

Bulgarian actor (1932–2016)

- Born: Nikola Stoyanov Anastasov; 22 April 1932; Sofia, Bulgaria
- Died: 8 August 2016 (aged 84); Sofia, Bulgaria
- Education: Krastyo Sarafov National Academy for Theatre and Film Arts
- Occupation: Actor
- Spouse: Marya Koseva
- Children: 2

Nikola Stoyanov Anastasov (Bulgarian: Никола Стоянов Анастасов; 22 April 1932 – 8 August 2016) was a Bulgarian actor.

== Biography ==
Nikola Anastasov was born on 22 April 1932 in Sofia, Bulgaria. He finished his education at the Krastyo Sarafov National Academy for Theatre and Film Arts, in the class of Prof. Philip Philipov. He was married to Bulgarian singer Marya Koseva and had two sons.

He died on 8 August 2016 in Sofia, aged 84.

== Career ==
Nikola Anastasov began performing in the theaters in Vratsa (1955–1956) and Varna (1956–1957). His first important role was in the comedy Когато розите танцува (When The Rose Dances) by Valeri Petrov. His later well known roles include Trimata ot zapasa (1971), Osmiyat (1969) and Samo ti, sartze (1987).

== Filmography ==
- Badi shtastliva, Ani! (1961)
- The last round (Последният рунд) (1961) as Garo
- Hot Afternoon (Горещо пладне) (1965)
- On the Sidewalk (По тротоара) (1967)
- With the medals of the devil (С пагоните на дявола) (1967, TV Series) as Zhano
- Posledniat voyvoda (1968) as Fotografat
- Byalata staya (1968) as Dirigent na orkestara
- Gospodin Nikoy (1969) as G-n Hayg
- Osmiyat (1969) as Chaplin
- Priznanie (1969)
- Trimata ot zapasa (1971) as Pejo Vutov
- Gerlovska istoriya (1971) as Tzvika
- The Phoney Civilization (Криворазбраната циливизация ) (1974, TV Movie) as Dimitraki
- Nako, Dako i Tsako: Moryatsi (1974) as Tsako
- Panteley (1978) as Marko
- Unexpected vacation (Неочаквана ваканция) (1981, TV Series) as Trader Lambo
- Samo ti, sartze (1987) as D-r Dzhaldeti
- Rapsodiya v byalo (2002) as Staretz v starcheskiya dom
- The Infinite Garden (2017) as Garabedian
