= The Phoney Civilization =

Криворазбраната цивилизация Krivorazbranata tsivilizatsiya The Phoney Civilization
- Original language: Bulgarian
- Written by: Dobri Voynikov
- Characters: Hadzhi Kosta; Zlata; Anka; Margaridi; Mariyka; Grandma Stoyna; Mityu; Dimitraki
- Genre: Satire, Comedy
- Setting: Late Bulgarian revival (The end of 19th century)

Premiere
- Date: 1871

The Phoney Civilization (Bulgarian: Криворазбраната цивилизация / Krivorazbranata tsivilizatsiya) is a five-acts satirical play written by the Bulgarian playwright Dobri Voynikov published in 1871.

In a comical folklore manner, the play satirizes the understanding of foreign fashion trends as human progress in Bulgarian society at the time. This is the most popular work by Voynikov who is among the pioneers of the Bulgarian theatre. The Phoney Civilization is a classic work of the Late Bulgarian revival period in the end of 19th century.

The best known production of the play is probably the 1974 TV musical adaptation directed by Hacho Boyadzhiev, featuring some of the prominent Bulgarian comic actors, including Georgi Partsalev and Georgi Kaloyanchev. Because of the relevance of its subject matter, the play is still staged at the theatres more than a hundred years after its first publishing.

== Characters ==
- Hajji Kosta: The head of the family.
- Zlata: Hadzhi Kosta's wife.
- Anka: Hadzhi Kosta and Zlata's daughter.
- Margaridi: Greek doctor, Anka's suitor.
- Mariyka: Anka's friend.
- Mityu: Young man in love with Anka.
- Grandma Stoyna: A matchmaker.
- Dimitraki: Anka's brother.
- Raycho: A domestic servant.
- Georgi: Mityu's friend.
- Pencho: Mityu's friend.
- Maystor Stanyu: Mityu's father.

== Synopsis ==
The action takes place in a small town during the late Bulgarian revival period in the end of 19th century. Hadzhi Kosta, a storekeeper, is concerned about the significant amount of money spent by his daughter and his wife for a variety of foreign fashion accessories and clothes that are totally unnecessary, according to him. He is also concerned about the neglect of the family traditions and the susceptibility of his daughter, his son and his wife to the emerging “fashionable” trends in behaviour fueled by the foreign brands and local snobs.
