= Democratic Vistas =

1871 book by Walt Whitman

Democratic Vistas is a book by the American author Walt Whitman, published in 1871. It is considered an early classic work of comparative politics and letters. Whitman, who was then working as a federal clerk, does much to expound on the influence of the Louisiana Purchase and expansion on the American spirit, character, and body politic (foreshadowing Frederick Jackson Turner's frontier thesis). He also criticizes Thomas Carlyle's Shooting Niagara: and after? and other literary works and comments on the Industrial Revolution and the predecessors of Modernism, which chose restraint and rationality above emotion and feelings.

Whitman condemns the corruption and greed of the Gilded Age, denouncing the post-Civil War materialism that had overtaken the country. “Never was there, perhaps, more hollowness at heart than at present, and here in the United States. Genuine belief seems to have left us,” he writes. His solution to the moral crisis is literature: "Two or three really original American poets...would give more compaction and more moral identity, (the quality to-day most needed) to these States, than all its Constitutions, legislative and judicial ties,” he declares, believing that literature would unite the country.
