= Sir Harry Hotspur of Humblethwaite =

1871 novel by Anthony Trollope

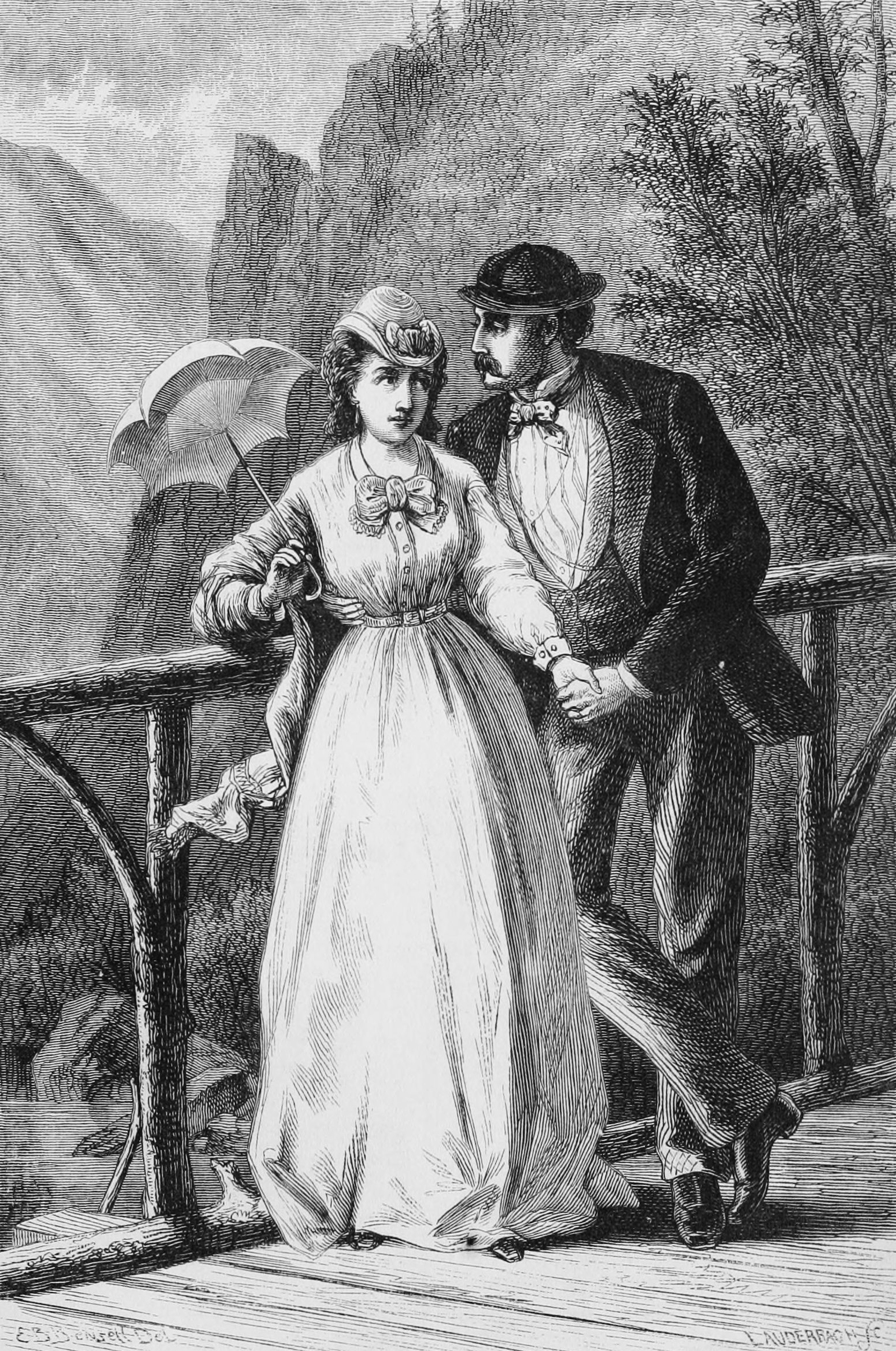
- Emily and George Hotspur
- Author: Anthony Trollope
- Language: English
- Genre: Novel
- Publication date: 1871
- Publication place: United Kingdom
- Media type: Print (Hardback)
- ISBN: 0-19-282205-5 (paperback edition)

Sir Harry Hotspur of Humblethwaite, by Anthony Trollope, is a novel originally published in Macmillan's Magazine between May and December, 1870, and in novel form in 1871.

The novel offers psychological dissection of the issues of inheritance, filial duty, noblesse oblige, gentlemanly behaviour, repentance and love, all hung upon the story of the wooing and losing of Sir Harry Hotspur's daughter (and heir to his property), Emily, by their "scamp" of a cousin (and heir to Sir Harry's baronetcy), Captain George Hotspur.
