= The Truck =

1980 film

- Directed by: Christo Christov
- Written by: Christo Christov; Emil Kaluchev; Kosta Strandjev
- Starring: Grigor Vachkov
- Cinematography: Atanas Tasev
- Release date: 17 November 1980
- Running time: 108 minutes
- Country: Bulgaria
- Language: Bulgarian

The Truck (Bulgarian: Камионът, translit. Kamionat) is a 1980 Bulgarian drama film directed by Christo Christov. It was entered into the 31st Berlin International Film Festival.

== Cast ==
- Grigor Vachkov as Dedleto
- Lilyana Kovacheva as Milena
- Veselin Vulkov as Shteryo
- Stefan Dimitrov as Doctor
- Djoko Rosic as Chatanugata (Chattanooga)
- Zhivka Peneva
- Emil Markov
- Yordan Spirov
- Nikolay Nachkov
- Hristo Krachmarov
- Iwan Tomow
- Minka Syulemezova
