= Georges Rouquier =

French actor

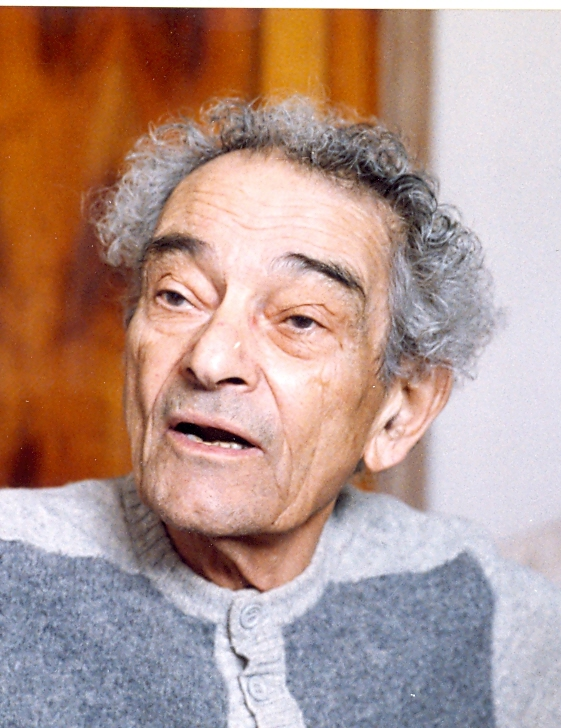
- Rouquier in 1984
- Born: 23 June 1909; Lunel-Viel, Hérault, Languedoc-Roussillon, France
- Died: 19 December 1989 (aged 80); Paris, France
- Occupations: Film director Screenwriter; Actor
- Years active: 1942–1983

Georges Rouquier (23 June 1909 – 19 December 1989) was a French film director, screenwriter and actor. He worked principally on documentary films, and his best-known work is Farrebique (1947) a lyrical evocation of farming life in Aveyron.

== Biography ==
Georges Rouquier was born in Lunel-Viel, Hérault into a family of modest means. He trained as a typographer and then a Linotype operator in Montpellier, and in the latter role he took a job in Paris in 1926. He developed an enthusiasm for the cinema and the works of Chaplin, DeMille, Eisenstein, Dovzhenko, and especially the documentarist Robert Flaherty. He met the documentary film-maker Eugène Deslaw who was impressed by his enthusiasm and agreed to teach him the basic techniques of film. Rouquier bought a second-hand camera and made his first (silent) film, Vendanges (1929; now lost), about grape-harvesting in his native region. He continued working in the printing business while further familiarising himself with filming methods, including sound, and it was in the 1940s during the German Occupation of France that he got the opportunity to make some short commissioned films. Le Tonnelier (1942) demonstrated the craftsmanship of a cooper as he makes a barrel, and Le Charron (1943) examined the work of another traditional artisan, a wheelwright. These and other short films which followed affirmed Rouquier's interest in showing men who expressed themselves in their accumulated traditional skills, drawn from an integrated rural way of life.

In 1944 Rouquier embarked on his first feature-length film, Farrebique, and spent 18 months living with a peasant farming family at Goutrens in Aveyron to document their way of life and their surroundings. He declared that he was interested in everything - their habits, customs, and religion, their family relationships, but also the life of insects, plants and the natural world around them. He produced from this a lyrical chronicle of rural life, structured around the four seasons, at a time when the traditional vision of agriculture was about to vanish with the introduction of mechanised production methods. When the film was released in 1947, it made considerable impact (despite some dissenters) and it was seen by 1,200,000 spectators in cinemas around France, as well as receiving the International Critics Prize at the Cannes film festival.

Rouquier wanted to make a second film which would show the changes brought to the farm by the introduction of electricity and other modernisations, but he was unable to get funding for it. However, 38 years later when he was 74, Rouquier finally had the chance to film his contrasting look at the same location in Biquefarre (1983), in which he applied the same detailed attention to a transformed way of life.

Rouquier continued to make commissioned short films on a variety of subjects, including portraits of the biologist and chemist Louis Pasteur (1947) and the composer Arthur Honegger (1955). He also filmed two fiction dramas, Sang et Lumières (1954) set in Spain, and S.O.S. Noronha (1957) which was based on an incident involving a French communications station off the coast of Brazil during an insurrection in 1930. In the 1960s and 1970s he made numerous films for television. He also made occasional appearances in films as an actor, including Z (1969) for Costa-Gavras and L'Amour nu (1981) for Yannick Bellon.

Georges Rouquier died in Paris in 1989 and was buried in Montparnasse Cemetery.

== Selected filmography ==
=== As director ===
Feature films

- 1946: Farrebique
- 1954: Sang et Lumières / Sangre y luces
- 1955: Lourdes et ses miracles (trilogy of documentaries)
- 1957: S.O.S. Noronha
- 1983: Biquefarre

Short/Medium length films

- 1929: Vendanges (about grape-harversting)
- 1942: Le Tonnelier (about a cooper)
- 1944: Le Charron (about a wheelwright)
- 1944: La Part de l'enfant
- 1944: L'Économie des métaux (on the recovery of used metals)
- 1948: L'Œuvre scientifique de Pasteur (in collaboration with Jean Painlevé)
- 1949: Le Chaudronnier
- 1951: Le Sel de la terre (on extracting salt in the Camargue)
- 1952: Un jour comme les autres (on the prevention of accidents at work)l
- 1952: Le Lycée sur la colline
- 1952: Malgovert (on the threat of flooding in a small mountain village)
- 1955: La Bête noire (on hunting a wild boar)
- 1955: Arthur Honegger (awarded a prize at the Venice Film Festival 1957)
- 1958: Une Belle Peur
- 1959: Le Notaire de Trois-Pistoles
- 1960: Le Bouclier (on health and safety)
- 1965: Sire, le Roy n'a plus rien dit (on French-Canadian furniture makers in the 17th and 18th centuries)
- 1976: Le Maréchal-ferrant (on the life of a blacksmith; won César for best documentary short of 1977)

=== As actor ===
- 1955: Le Sabotier du Val de Loire (narrator) directed by Jacques Demy
- 1957: Lettre de Sibérie (narrator) directed by Chris Marker
- 1962: Mandrin (as Voltaire) directed by Jean-Paul Le Chanois
- 1969: Jeff (as Jeff) directed by Jean Herman
- 1969: Z directed by Costa-Gavras
- 1970: Nous n'irons plus aux bois (as doctor) directed by Georges Dumoulin
- 1971: Primer año directed by Patricio Guzmán
- 1972: Beau Masque (as Vizille) directed by Bernard Paul
- 1981: L'Amour nu (as Jean Lafaye) directed by Yannick Bellon
