= Ivan Ognyanov Yanchev =

Bulgarian footballer

Ivan Yanchev
Personal information
- Full name: Ivan Ognyanov Yanchev
- Date of birth: 20 March 1988 (age 38)
- Place of birth: Parvomay, Bulgaria
- Height: 1.90 m (6 ft 3 in)
- Position: Forward

Team information
- Current team: Nesebar

Youth career
- Slavia Sofia

Senior career*
Years	Team	Apps	(Gls)
2007	Montana	3	(0)
2008–2009	Minyor Bobov dol	?	(?)
2009–2010	Svilengrad	24	(7)
2010–2012	Beroe	3	(0)
2011–2012	→ Nesebar (loan)	17	(3)
2012–2013	Marek Dupnitsa	37	(13)
2014–2015	Akademik Svishtov	6	(0)
2016–2017	Strumska Slava Radomir	?	(?)
- * Club domestic league appearances and goals as of 1 July 2015

Ivan Ognyanov Yanchev (Bulgarian: Иван Огнянов Янчев; born 20 March 1988) is a Bulgarian footballer who plays as a forward for Marek.
