= Iren Krivoshieva =

Bulgarian actress

- Ирен Кривошиева
- Born: 8 July 1956 (age 70); Sofia, Bulgaria
- Occupation: Actress

Iren Krivoshieva (Bulgarian: Ирен Кривошиева; born 8 July 1956) is a Bulgarian actress and writer.

== Life and career ==
Born in Sofia, Krivoshieva studied at the Krastyo Sarafov National Academy for Theatre and Film Arts. She was mainly active between 1983 and 1990. In 1992, she moved to Naples, Florida, and left acting. She moved back to Bulgaria twenty years later, in 2012. In 2015 she debuted as a writer with the novel Заключена в другия ("Locked in the Other"), co-written with Nikolai Nikolov.

=== Personal life ===
Krivoshieva was married and divorced five times. She had a son, Vladimir, with actor and politician Stefan Danailov.
