= Veselin Branev =

Bulgarian film director, screenwriter, film critic and writer

- Веселин Бранев
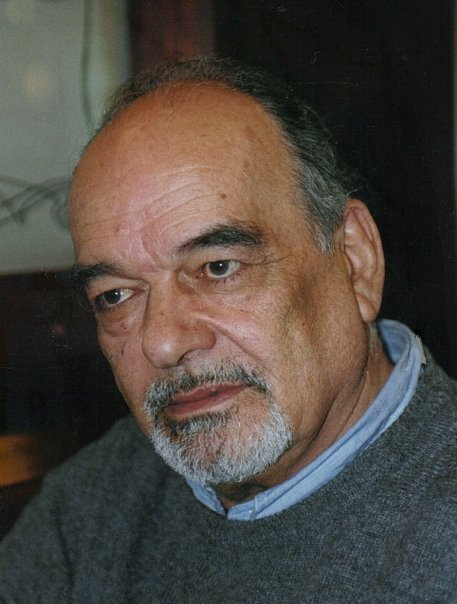
- Branev in 2009
- Born: 28 April 1932; Sofia, Bulgaria
- Died: 21 February 2014 (aged 81); Quebec, Canada
- Other names: Vesselin Branev
- Occupation: Writer

Veselin Nedelchev Branev (Bulgarian: Веселин Неделчев Бранев; 28 April 1932 - 21 February 2014) was a Bulgarian film director, screenwriter, film critic and writer.

== Life and career ==
The brother of the director Georgi, Branev graduated in law at the Sofia University, and then studied film directing in Berlin. From 1957 he was active as a screenwriter at Boyana Film, and in 1983 he made his directorial film debut with Hotel Central, which was entered into the competition at the 40th Venice International Film Festival to large critical acclaim.

Branev was also active as a columnist and film critic, working for prominent publications such as Narodna kultura and Narodna mladezh. In 1997 he moved to Canada, where he mainly focused on his literary activity. His 2007 semi-autobiographical novel Sledeniyat chovek (Следеният човек, "The tracked man"), raised a critical stir and large controversies in his home country.

During his life he was the recipient of several awards and accolades, including the Order of Saints Cyril and Methodius, and the Golden Rose Award.

== Death ==
He died on 21 February 2014, at the age of 81.
