= Sava Dobroplodni =

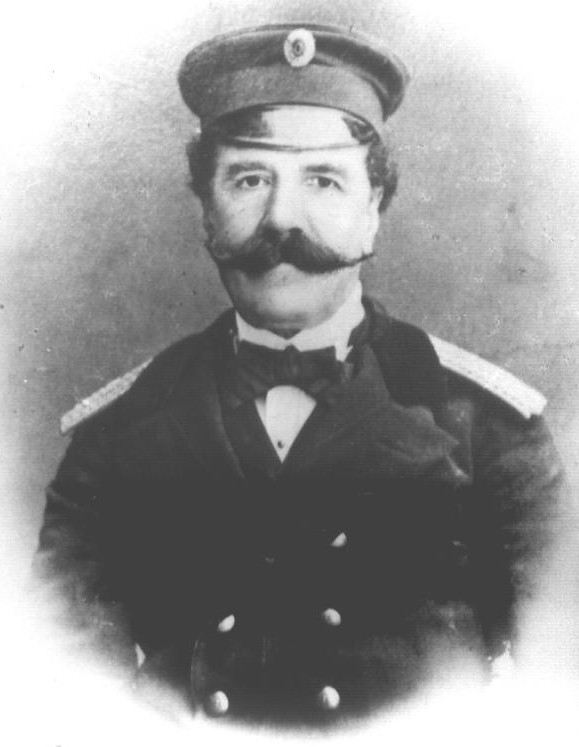
Sava Dobroplodni

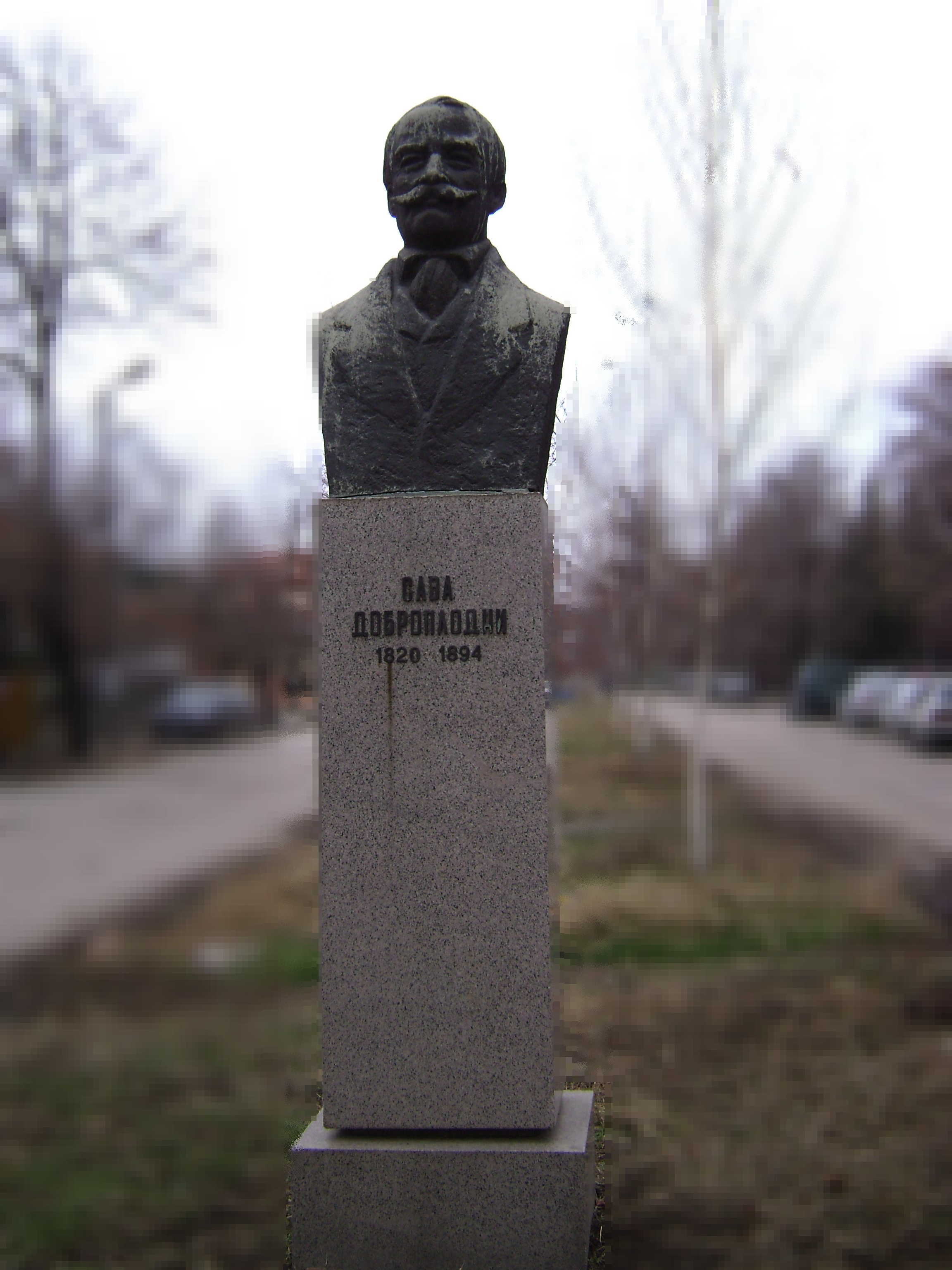
Monument to Dobroplodni in Silistra

Sava Dobroplodni (Bulgarian: Сава Доброплодни; 3 December 1820 – 19 April 1894), born Sava Hadzhiiliev (Сава Хаджиилиев), was a Bulgarian writer, teacher and theatrical worker of the Bulgarian National Revival and an honorary member of the Bulgarian Academy of Sciences.

== Biography ==
Dobroplodni was born in the Bulgarian town of Sliven. He began his education in Kotel, but graduated from the Phanar Greek Orthodox College in Istanbul. Upon graduating he became a teacher and served in many towns around the country, including Kotel, Shumen, Sliven, Varna, Tulcea and Silistra. During the Crimean War of 1853–1856, Dobroplodni briefly worked as a Greek-language teacher in the Austrian Empire, more specifically at the Sremski Karlovci high school. After he returned to the Bulgarian lands, he initiated the foundation of the cultural centre (chitalishte) in Shumen and the staging of the comedy play Mihal the Mouse-Eater in 1856. The staging of Mihal the Mouse-Eater was the first organized theatrical performance in Bulgaria.

After the Liberation of Bulgaria in 1878, Dobroplodni was a state official and after 1881 a school inspector. He wrote several textbooks, such as Guide to Mixed Schools, Concise Health, New Easy Method to Study Bulgarian and Practical Russian and Greek. He edited the New Bulgarian Bee newspaper and authored several plays, including The Three Corporals, The Petition Writer, etc.

Dobroplodni died in Sofia on 19 April 1894.
