= Zako Heskiya =

Bulgarian film director (1922–2006)

- Born: 21 September 1922; Istanbul, Ottoman Empire
- Died: 3 June 2006 (aged 83); Sofia, Bulgaria
- Occupation: Film director
- Years active: 1965-1989

Zako Heskija (Зако Хеския), born Isaac Solomonov Heskiya (Исак Соломонов Хеския), also transliterated as Zako Heskia or Sako Cheskija (21 September 1922 – 3 June 2006), was a Bulgarian film director and screenwriter. He was born in Istanbul to Jewish parents.

== Education and Career ==
Heskiya graduated Cinema and Photograph College in Sofia. From 1956 to 1965 he was an assistant director for Boyana Film Studio. Heskia gained international attention in 1966 for Gorechto Pladne (Torrid Noon), the first Bulgarian contribution to the Cannes Film Festival and a nomination for the Palme d'Or. In 1981 he won the Special Prize at the 12th Moscow International Film Festival for Yo Ho Ho.

Zako Heskiya worked as a head of the "Debut" group at the former Boyana Studio (succeeded by Nu Boyana Film Studios) and opened the door to professional work for many young Bulgarian film directors.

== Filmography ==
Films

- 1966 Goreshto pladne (Torrid Noon) (Director)
- 1966 The Start of the Summer Holidays (Director)
- 1969 The Eighth (Director)
- 1971 Three Reservists (Director)
- 1974 Dawn Over the Drava (Director)
- 1976 Bou Posledon (Director/ Screenplay)
- 1979 A Final Battle (Director)
- 1981 Yo Ho Ho (Director)
- 1989 Scar-Free (Director)

TV films

- 1979 Alone Among Wolves (Director)
- 1985 Nights with the White Horses (Director)
