= Hacho Boyadzhiev =

Hacho Kirilov Boyadzhiev (Bulgarian: Хачо Кирилов Бояджиев; 20 January 1932 – 23 April 2012) was a Bulgarian television and film director.

He was probably best known as the director of the popular TV musical The Phoney Civilization (1974) as well as the director of the New Year's evening TV Variety-Shows broadcast by the national television.

== Biography and career ==
Boyadzhiev was born in Sofia under the name Imre as the illegitimate son of car racer and bohemian Dimitar Sokolov and 17-year-old Hungarian emigrant mother Piri, a milliner. However, his mother's parents did not approve the two's relationship and he was adopted by the Novi Pazar merchant Kiril Boyadzhiev, whom he considers his real father, when he was six months old; the document was issued in Skopje. Until the death of his adoptive father, he didn't see his Hungarian mother by birth.

Boyadzhiev spent his childhood in Novi Pazar and then enrolled in the Saint Augustine French college in Plovdiv. During the Allied bombings of the city in 1943, he returned to Novi Pazar. In 1951, he began studying mathematics at Sofia University but soon moved to the National Academy for Theatre and Film Arts to study directing.

After graduating and heading the Vidin Theatre Boyadzhiev went to Beirut, Lebanon, after an invitation by a fellow student. In Lebanon, he suffered a severe car crash due to a drugged taxi driver; of the six people in the car, only Boyadzhiev survived, although with a broken backbone. After his rehabilitation he worked as a make-up man for an Arabic movie. At age 28–29, he moved to Paris, France, by becoming a stoker on a Beirut–Marseille steamship. In France he was a waiter in a bistro; it was at this time that he met filmmaker René Clair and went on to work as his assistant for three years.

Boyadzhiev also worked in New York City in the United States as well as Canada (as a CBS correspondent) and Hollywood and took his doctor's degree in cinema and television studies from the University of Cambridge. In 1963–1964, he started working with the Bulgarian National Television as a news director: among the best-known television programmes he has directed are Flight Over the Night and Todor Kolev's How are we Going to Catch up with the Americans…?. From 1993 to 1995, he headed the Bulgarian National Television; in 1971–1979, he was the television's head director. He was married two times and had seven daughters, most from women he has not been married to. Three were born in Bulgaria and bear his family name, two were born in the United States, one in France and one in England.

He died on 23 April 2012 in Sofia.

== Filmography ==
- Macbeth (1978)
- This Fine Age of Maturity (1985)
- The Man on the Road (1987)
