= Pavel Vezhinov =

Bulgarian writer (1914–1983)

- Born: Nikola Delchev Gugov; 9 November 1914; Sofia, Bulgaria
- Died: 20 December 1983 (aged 69); Sofia, Bulgaria
- Education: Sofia University, Sofia
- Occupation: Writer
- Writing career
- Pen name: Pavel Vezhinov
- Genres: Novel, Short story, Screenplay
- Notable works: The Barrier (Бариерата) (1976); In the night riding the white horses (Нощем с белите коне)(1975)
- Notable awards: "People's Republic Of Bulgaria" order, II degree (1964); Title "People's cultural figure" (1970); Title "Hero of the socialist labor" (1974) "Georgi Dimitrov" order (1974); Recipient of the Dimitrov Prize (1950, 1951, 1971, 1976)

Pavel Vezhinov (Bulgarian: Павел Вежинов) (November 9, 1914 – December 2, 1983), born Nikola Delchev Gugov (Bulgarian: Никола Делчев Гугов), was a Bulgarian novelist and scriptwriter, with an interest in social and ethical issues, and one of the first Bulgarian authors to use elements of fantasy in his fiction. Vezhinov is best known for his novels The Barrier (Бариерата) (1976) and In the night riding the white horses (Нощем с белите коне) (1975), both later adapted for screen, as well as the screenplay for the Bulgarian film classic Three Reservists (Тримата от запаса)(1971).

== Life ==
Pavel Vezhinov was born on November 9, 1914, in Sofia. In the early 1930s he wrote for several magazines, including Жупел (Sulfur), РЛФ (RLF), Щит (Shield) and Изкуство и критика (Art and Critique). From 1938-1944 he studied philosophy at Sofia University. In 1938 he also published his first collection of stories, Улица без паваж (Street without Pavement), followed in 1943 by Дни и вечери (Days and Evenings). He joined the Bulgarian Communist Party in 1944.

Beginning in 1944, Vezhinov participated in World War II as a war correspondent and editor-in-chief of Фронтовак (Front Fighter). He later used his war experiences in stories like Златан (Zlatan) and Втора рота (Second Company, which has been republished several times). In 1950 and 1951 he was awarded the Dimitrov Prize for his war stories.

From 1947 to 1951 Pavel Vezhinov was assistant chief editor of the satirical journal Стършел (Hornet), and from 1951 of the journal Септември (September). From 1954 to 1972 he worked for Българска кинематография (Bulgarian Cinematography) first as a scriptwriter and later as assistant General Director. In 1972 he became an editor-in-chief of the magazine Съвременник (Contemporary) and a member of the Buro of the Steering Council of the Union of Bulgarian Authors.

Throughout the 1950s and 1960s he published several crime stories and novels such as Следите остават (Traces Remain, 1954), Произшествие на тихата улица (Silence on a Quiet Street, 1960), Човекът в сянка (Shadow Man, 1965), Прилепите летят нощем (Bats Fly at Night, 1969), as well as writing travel accounts of Bulgarian athletes at the Olympic games : Знамена по стадионите (Stadium Flags, 1950), На Олимпиада в Хелзенки (At the Olympics in Helsinki, 1953) and До Мелбълн по въздух и море (To Melbourne by Air and Sea, 1957). He served as a chief officer of the boxing section.

He was one of the first Bulgarian authors to use fantasy in his writing as a means to convey parable or metaphor. In 1956 he wrote a satirical story Историята на едно привидение (The Story of an Enlightenment), and in 1965 the stories Сините пеперуди (Blue Butterflies) and Моят пръв ден (My First Day). In 1973 he published a novel Гибелта на Аякс (The Death of Ajax).

In 1963 a collection of short stories Момчето с цигулката (The Boy with the Violin) came out and marked a new direction to his writing, when he became concerned with the moral and ethical issues of modern life: Дъх на бадеми (Almonds, 1966), Звездите над нас (The Stars Over Us, 1966) and Малките приключения (Little Adventures) followed.

The novel Нощем с белите коне (Night with White Horses, 1975) first appeared in the literary journal Септември. In 1976 it was followed by Бариерата (The Barrier, 1976), for which he received another Dimitrov Prize. Each of the several years that followed was marked by another work: Белият гущер (The White Lizard, 1977), Синият камък (The Blue Stone, 1977), Езерното момче (Lake Boy, 1979).

His last finished novel was Везни (Libra, 1982), in which the author continued reflecting on philosophical and psychological problems and the complexity of human existence. His last story Дълъг летен ден (Long Summer Day) was printed in the journal "Съвременник" (vol. 3, 1983 г.) shortly before his death.

Vezhinov died suddenly on December 20, 1983.

== Awards ==
- "People's Republic Of Bulgaria" order, II degree (1964)
- Title "People's cultural figure" (1970)
- Title "Hero of socialist labor" (1974)
- "Order of Georgi Dimitrov" (1974)
- Recipient of the Dimitrov Prize (1950, 1951, 1971, 1976)

== Selected works ==
=== Collections of stories ===
- Улици без паваж - 1938
- Дни и вечери - 1942
- На пост - 1947
- Мека мебел (роман)|Мека мебел - 1948
- Невероятни истории - 1958
- Нашата сила - 1958
- Момчето с цигулката - 1963
- Дъх на бадеми - 1966
- Сините пеперуди - 1968
- Синият камък . 1977

=== Stories ===
- Бариерата - 1976
- Белият гущер - 1977
- Езерното момче - 1976
- Един есенен ден по шосето - 1967
- Втора рота - 1949
- В полето - 1950
- Златан - 1949
- Знамена над стадиона - 1950
- Далеч от бреговете - 1958
- Нашата сила - 1958
- Произшествие на тихата улица - 1960
- Кутия за енфие - 1973

=== Novels ===
- Синият залез - 1947
- За честта на Родината - 1949
- Следите остават - 1954
- Произшествие на тихата улица - 1960
- Звездите над нас (Павел Вежинов)|Звездите над нас - 1966
- Прилепите летят нощем - 1969
- Малките приключения - 1970
- Кутия за енфие - 1973
- Самопризнание - 1973
- Гибелта на Аякс - 1973
- Нощем с белите коне - 1975
- Малки семейни хроники - ироничен роман, София. 1982 г,
- Везни - 1982

=== Film scripts ===
- Бариерата (филм)|Бариерата
- Следите остават
- Зарево над Драва
- Тримата от запаса
- Специалист по всичко
- Среднощна среща
- На всеки километър
- Нощем с белите коне (филм)|Нощем с белите коне
- Произшествие на сляпата улица
- Трета след слънцето

=== Works translated into English ===
- The Boy With the Violin. Sofia, Foreign Languages Press, (1965).
- Far From the Shore. (Edited by Marjorie Pojarliova. Translated by Gregor Pavlov): Sofia, Foreign Languages Press, (1967)
