= Survival (Madonna song) =

Song by Madonna

from the album Bedtime Stories
- A-side: "Bedtime Story"
- Released: October 24, 1994
- Recorded: 1994
- Studio: Chappell Studios (Los Angeles)
- Genre: R&B; pop; dance-pop
- Length: 3:33
- Label: Maverick; Sire; Warner Bros.
- Songwriters: Madonna; Dallas Austin
- Producers: Nellee Hooper; Madonna

Audio
- "Survival" on YouTube

"Survival" is a song recorded by American singer Madonna for her sixth studio album, Bedtime Stories (1994). She wrote the R&B, pop, and dance-pop track with Dallas Austin and produced it with Nellee Hooper. Inspired by the backlash Madonna faced following the release of her sexually explicit 1992 projects Erotica and Sex, the lyrics of "Survival" deal with resilience in the face of criticism. Its composition includes keyboards, synthesizers, and programming. Donna De Lory and Niki Haris provide background vocals.

Upon the release of Bedtime Stories, music critics praised the production of "Survival". Its lyrics were a further topic of commentary; some considered them striking and compared them to the album track "Human Nature" (1995). In April 1995, Maverick and Warner Bros. Records issued "Bedtime Story" as the third single from Bedtime Stories in the US, with "Survival" as its B-side. Madonna included "Survival" (Quiet Storm Demo Remix) on the 2025 anniversary edition Bedtime Stories: The Untold Chapter.

== Background and release ==
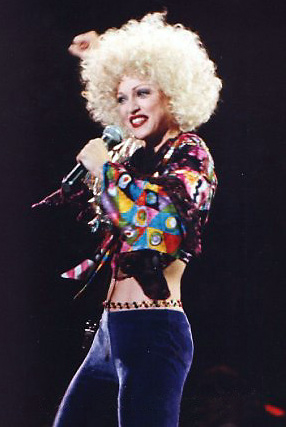
Madonna performing in 1993

American singer and songwriter Madonna drew strong media backlash for her sexually explicit projects issued between 1992 and 1993. These included her fifth studio album, Erotica; her book Sex; and the films Body of Evidence and Dangerous Game. Critics reacted unfavorably to their sexually explicit themes and began to question Madonna's overreliance on them. For her sixth studio album, Bedtime Stories (1994), she attempted to soothe her public image by embracing a subdued pop and R&B sound. Madonna began working relationships many R&B producers and songwriters, such as Babyface, and Dave Hall, and Dallas Austin, as well as British club producer Nellee Hooper.

Maverick and Warner Bros. Records released Bedtime Stories on October 24, 1994. "Survival" is the first of its twelve songs. After the singles "Secret" and "Take a Bow" had experienced their chart success, the labels issued "Bedtime Story" as the album's third single on April 11, 1995, in the United States. Its 7-inch vinyl, CD, and cassette singles included "Survival" as the B-side, while it appeared as the fourth of seven songs on the CD maxi single. Madonna issued Bedtime Stories: The Untold Chapter on November 28, 2025; it is a thirtieth-anniversary extended play of Bedtime Stories containing demo tracks, alternate versions, and rarities. "Survival" (Quiet Storm Demo Remix) is the opening track among its eight songs.

== Composition ==
Madonna wrote "Survival" with Austin and produced it with Hooper. In mid-1994, Madonna flew Hooper and his assistant programmer, Marius de Vries, out to Los Angeles. "Survival" became the first song Madonna and Hooper produced together at Chappell Studios in Encino, California. Alvin Speights, Brad Gilderman, Darin Prindle, Mark "Spike" Stent, and Michael Fossenberg engineered the track, while Alvin Speights and Jon Gass mixed it. De Vries provided programming. "Survival" also features keyboards from Austin, synthesizers from Babyface, and bass from Colin Wolfe and Meshell Ndegeocello.

"Survival" (1994)
Donna De Lory and Niki Haris provide background vocals on "Survival".

"Survival" is a midtempo R&B, pop, and dance-pop track that is three minutes and thirty-three seconds long. Madonna's timbre on the track varies from whispering to cooing. John Kendle of The Winnipeg Sun likened her vocals on "Survival" to those of a little girl. Donna De Lory and Niki Haris provide background vocals on the song; they had provided backing vocals for Madonna for seven years at the time. De Lory stated the sessions for "Survival" took a few hours and there were no retakes.

The lyrics of "Survival" concern resilience in the face of criticism: "I'll never be an angel / I'll never be a saint, it's true / I'm too busy surviving". The backlash Madonna faced following the sexually explicit releases of Erotica and Sex inspired the song's themes. Lines that directly address music critics and former fans include: "Does your criticism / Have you caught up in what you cannot see? / If you give me respect / then you know what to expect". Madonna said of the song: "The other songs [on Bedtime Stories] could be about anybody, but in ['Survival' and 'Human Nature'] it's quite obvious I'm addressing the public." The lyrics of "Survival" often juxtapose opposing concepts, including up and down, heaven and hell, and angels and saints. Some scholars argued that this contributed to the song's abundance of hooks.

== Critical reception ==
Music critics praised the composition of "Survival". Some thought it possessed verve and others found it catchy. Commentators contrasted it with other dance-oriented songs in Madonna's discography, such as "Like a Virgin" (1984), "Over and Over" (1984), and "Express Yourself" (1989). For Gary Graff of the Detroit Free Press, the keyboards elevated its production. The Chicago Tribune's Greg Kot said Hooper's production let Madonna leverage her voice. The Patriot Ledger's Mick Skidmore thought "Survival" could be commercially successful and Telegram & Gazette writer Craig S. Semon considered it radio-friendly. Chris Heath of The Daily Telegraph referred to it as one of Madonna's "more supple dance-pop songs".

Critics were more ambivalent towards the lyrics of "Survival". The Fort Worth Star-Telegram's David Ferman said it depicted a "feistiness" similar to Erotica's and The Hamilton Spectator's Nick Krewer thought it may have been Madonna's most autobiographical work to date. The Morning Call writer Len Righi thought she sounded arrogant and Kendle dismissed "Survival" as a "whiny declaration of self". Writing for The Province, Tom Harrison believed it contributed to Bedtime Stories being her most forthright album. Tim Cooper of the Evening Standard deemed the chorus a terse encapsulation of her career. The Florida Times-Union's Rickey Wright felt that the lyrics were laden with psychobabble.

The themes of "Survival" were discussed in relation to those of "Human Nature"—another Bedtime Stories track that addressed Madonna's detractors. Critics considered the lyrics of both songs the most striking on the album. Writing for The Baltimore Sun, J. D. Considine described "Human Nature" and "Survival" as "the closest thing you'll find [in Bedtime Stories] to career commentary". The vocals on the song received commentary. Semon thought Madonna's were lackluster. The backing vocals of De Lory and Haris were well received. Peter Galvin of The Advocate referred to the harmonies as "girlish" and thought they recalled "True Blue" (1986). PopMatters critic Peter Piatkowski compared them to those of En Vogue and SWV.

== Credits and personnel ==
Credits are adapted from the Bedtime Stories liner notes.

Locations

- Recorded at Chappell Studios, Los Angeles
- Mastered at Sterling Sound, New York City

Personnel

- Madonna – songwriting, production, vocals
- Dallas Austin – songwriting, keyboards, drums
- Nellee Hooper – production
- Alvin Speights, Brad Gilderman, Darin Prindle, Mark "Spike" Stent, Michael Fossenberg – engineering
- Alvin Speights, Jon Gass – mixing
- Babyface – drum programming, synthesizer
- Tommy Martin – guitar
- Colin Wolfe, Meshell Ndegeocello – bass
- Craig Armstrong – arranging
- Marius de Vries – programming
- Jessie Leavey – arranging, conducting
- Suzie Katayama – conducting
