= Inside of Me (Madonna song) =

1994 song by Madonna

Song by Madonna

from the album Bedtime Stories
- Released: October 24, 1994
- Recorded: 1994
- Studio: Chappell Studios (Los Angeles)
- Genre: R&B; dance
- Length: 4:11
- Label: Maverick; Sire; Warner Bros.
- Songwriters: Madonna; Dave Hall; Nellee Hooper
- Producers: Hooper; Madonna

Audio
- "Inside of Me" on YouTube

"Inside of Me" is a song recorded by American singer and songwriter Madonna for her sixth studio album, Bedtime Stories (1994). Madonna and Nellee Hooper produced the slow jam, which they wrote with Dave Hall. The lyrics of "Inside of Me" lament the death of Madonna's mother, who died when she was five; many critics interpreted the song as being about a former lover. Its R&B and dance composition includes guitar, strings, keyboards, drum programming, and a saxophone sample.

Madonna's vocals on "Inside of Me" are breathy and restrained; she sings it in a cooing timbre. The song samples "Outstanding" (1984) by the Gap Band, "Back & Forth" (1994) by Aaliyah, and "The Trials of Life" (1994) by Gutter Snypes. Music critics deemed "Inside of Me" one of the better tracks on Bedtime Stories; they considered its emotional depth genuine and thought it depicted a more vulnerable side of Madonna. Others gave her vocal performance mixed reviews.

== Background and release ==
American singer and songwriter Madonna's fifth studio album, Erotica, was released in 1992. Criticism of its overtly sexual themes prompted her to tone them down on her sixth studio album, Bedtime Stories (1994). For the project, she enlisted producers Dallas Austin, Babyface, Dave Hall, and Nellee Hooper. Madonna composed "Inside of Me", as well as two other Bedtime Stories tracks, at Hall's Elmsford, New York, studio in May 1994. She then flew Hooper and his assistant programmer, Marius de Vries, out to Los Angeles. At Chappell Studios in Encino, California, Madonna and Hooper wrote, produced, and recorded three songs for the album, one of which was "Inside of Me". The track is the fifth of eleven on Bedtime Stories, which Maverick, Sire, and Warner Bros. Records issued on October 24, 1994.

== Music and lyrics ==
At four minutes and eleven seconds long, "Inside of Me" is a midtempo R&B and dance track. Critics described it as both a ballad and a slow jam. The track samples "Outstanding" (1984) by the Gap Band, "Back & Forth" (1994) by Aaliyah, and "The Trials of Life" (1994) by Gutter Snypes. Madonna's vocals on "Inside of Me" are breathy and restrained; Fort Worth Star-Telegram's David Ferman considered them soulful. She sings with a cooing timbre. Richard Harrington likened her vocals to that of a little girl during the lines, "In the public eye I act like I don't care / When there's no one watching me / I'm crying".

Michael Fossenberg, Mark "Spike" Stent, Darin Prindle, Brad Gilderman, and Alvin Speights engineered "Inside of Me", while Speights and Jon Gass mixed it and de Vries programmed it. Its instrumentation includes bass by Colin Wolfe and Meshell Ndegeocello, keyboards and drums by Dallas Austin, guitar by Tommy Martin, and drum programming and synthesizer by Babyface. J. D. Considine of The Baltimore Sun noted that the throbbing bass and jazz-infused keyboards were common features of Hooper's productions. Jessie Leavey and Suzie Katayama conducted the track, which Leavey and Craig Armstrong arranged. It also features a recurring saxophone sample.

The lyrics of "Inside of Me" lament the death of Madonna's mother, Madonna Louise Ciccone, who died when Madonna was five: "Even though you're gone / Love still carries on". Some critics have interpreted the song as being about a former lover. Multiple commentators said that the lyrics were ambiguous and it was possible to construe them either way. Eric Henderson of Slant Magazine compared the ambiguity to Erotica, where themes of hedonism hid what he described as "an inner devastation".

== Critical reception ==
Music critics commented on Madonna's vocal performance on "Inside of Me". Writing for the Fort Worth Star-Telegram, David Ferman considered it to be one of her best. Considine said that her breathy voice made the "melody as quietly memorable as a lover's whisper". In contrast, Mick Skidmore of The Patriot Ledger thought her sultry and sensuous vocals did not add much emotion or sincerity to "Inside of Me". Anthony Violanti of The Buffalo News felt that Madonna attempted to "sound wicked" on the track, but argued that "it's difficult to take her seriously". Troy L. Smith of Cleveland.com believed that she was attempting to imitate Kylie Minogue.

Several critics evaluated "Inside of Me" as emotionally genuine. Ira Robbins wrote in Newsday that it is one of the few tracks on Bedtime Stories capable of provoking thought and deemed it a "touching lament for [Madonna's] late mother". For Ross Raihala, writing in The Forum, it had a completely different meaning to him after learning about the death of her mother. According to The Springfield News-Leader critic Ron Sylvester, the track revealed a warmhearted side of her that many listeners may have forgotten. In the York Daily Record, Timothy J. Maher viewed "Inside of Me" as Madonna "ditch[ing] her superwoman routine and allow[ing] herself some human fratility [sic]". As opined by Quentin Harrison in PopMatters, it depicted her improvement as a songwriter.

Other reviewers found "Inside of Me" unremarkable or regarded it as an attempt at emotional depth. Owen Pallett of Pitchfork thought it paled in comparison to the defining R&B and hip-hop acts of the time, such as Toni Braxton, Salt-N-Pepa, and Janet Jackson. Nonetheless, "Inside of Me" is frequently included on rankings of Madonna's music. Many critics regarded it as a standout and one of the best songs on Bedtime Stories. In a 2015 i-D article, Nick Levine included it on an unranked list of Madonna's ten most underrated tracks. Michael Cragg of the same publication considered it to be among her fifty best songs in 2018. On a 2020 list of Madonna's twenty greatest deep cuts, Sal Cinquemani and Henderson from Slant Magazine ranked "Inside of Me" at number seven.

== Credits and personnel ==
Adapted from the Bedtime Stories liner notes

=== Locations ===
- Recorded at Chappell Studios, Los Angeles
- Mastered at Sterling Sound, New York City

=== Personnel ===
- Madonna – songwriting, production
- Nellee Hooper – songwriting, production
- Dave Hall – songwriting
- Michael Fossenberg, Mark "Spike" Stent, Darin Prindle, Brad Gilderman, Alvin Speights – engineering
- Alvin Speights, Jon Gass – mixing
- Babyface – synthesizer, drum programming
- Marius de Vries – programming
- Jessie Leavey – strings, conducting
- Susie Katiyama – conducting
- Marius de Vries – guitar
- Tommy Martin – guitar
- Colin Wolfe, Meshell Ndegeocello – bass

== Sources ==
- Arnold, Chuck (October 20, 2022). "Madonna's Erotica Album at 30: Every Song Ranked From Worst to Best". Billboard. Archived from the original on October 20, 2022.
- Bego, Mark (2000). Madonna: Blonde Ambition. Cooper Square Press. ISBN 978-0-8154-1051-5.
- Campbell, Chuck (October 28, 1994). "Bedtime with Madonna Is a Bit Drowsy". The Knoxville News-Sentinel – via Newspapers.com.
- Cinquemani, Sal; Henderson, Eric (August 21, 2020). "Madonna's 20 Greatest Deep Cuts". Slant Magazine. Archived from the original on September 13, 2026.
- Cinquemani, Sal (November 28, 2025). "Madonna Bedtime Stories – The Untold Chapter Review". Slant Magazine.
- Considine, J. D. (October 25, 1994). "Bedtime Stories Short on Scandal and Long on Groove". The Baltimore Sun – via Newspapers.com.
- Cragg, Michael (August 9, 2018). "The Sixty Best Madonna Songs". i-D. Archived from the original on November 12, 2024.
- de Yampert, Rick (December 9, 1994). "Madonna Tells Nice Bedtime Stories". The Daytona Beach News-Journal – via Newspapers.com.
- Erlewine, Stephen Thomas. "Madonna: Bedtime Stories". AllMusic. Archived from the original on June 2, 2012.
- Ferman, David (October 28, 1994). "A Good Album From the Bad Girl". Fort Worth Star-Telegram – via Newspapers.com.
- Filipski, Drew (October 24, 2024). "Bedtime Stories at 30: The Lullaby That Saved Madonna's Legacy". Queerty. Archived from the original on September 14, 2026.
- Ford, Lynn Dean (November 7, 1994). "Madonna's Traded Overt Sexuality for Lots of '70s Soul". The Indianapolis Star – via Newspapers.com.
- Gundersen, Edna (October 24, 1994). "Madonna Snuggles Up for Bedtime Romance". USA Today – via Newspapers.com.
- Harrington, Richard (October 26, 1994). "Recordings–Bedtime: Madonna Wept Here". The Washington Post.
- Harrison, Quentin (February 11, 2014). "Madonna and Kylie Minogue Pick Up Donna Summer's Torch and Run With It". PopMatters.
- Homewood, Ben (June 21, 2016). "Autodrama Review". NME.
- "How Does the MDNA Album Fare Among the Rest of Madonna's Repertoire?". October 26, 2012 – via Newspapers.com.
- Johnson, Kevin C. (July 26, 2019). "Mary J. Blige, Nas and 23 Other Artists with Albums Turning 25: Bedtime Stories, Madonna". St. Louis Post-Dispatch – via Newspapers.com.
- Leopold, Jason (November 7, 1994). "Working with Material Girl". The Journal News – via Newspapers.com.
- Levine, Nick (February 25, 2015). "The Top 10 Most Underrated Madonna Tracks". i-D. Archived from the original on February 26, 2015.
- Lynch, Joe (October 6, 2014). "Madonna's Bedtime Stories Turns 20: Babyface & Donna De Lory Look Back". Billboard. Archived from the original on January 20, 2022.
- Madonna (1994). Bedtime Stories (liner notes). Maverick.
- Maher, Timothy J. (November 3, 1994). "Madonna Finally Shows Her Vulnerability". York Daily Record – via Newspapers.com.
- O'Brien, Lucy (2008). Madonna: Like an Icon. Bantam Press. ISBN 978-0-593-05547-2.
- O'Dair, Barbara (December 15, 1994). "Bedtime Stories". Rolling Stone.
- Pallett, Owen (August 16, 2017). "Madonna: Bedtime Stories". Pitchfork. Archived from the original on August 16, 2017.
- Pareles, Jon (November 1, 1994). "Alone Again, Naturally". The Guardian – via Newspapers.com.
- Puckett, Jeffrey Lee (November 5, 1994). "Reviews: Bedtime Stories Madonna (Maverick)". The Courier-Journal – via Newspapers.com.
- Raihala, Ross (December 29, 1994). "Bedtime Stories Madonna" – via Newspapers.com.
- Robbins, Ira (October 24, 1994). "Madonna's Album Takes It to the Sheets". Newsday – via Newspapers.com.
- Rooksby, Rikky (2004). The Complete Guide to the Music of Madonna. Omnibus Press. ISBN 978-0-7119-9883-4.
- Sanford, James (April 18, 2003). "Two Decades of Madonna". The Kalamazoo Gazette – via Newspapers.com.
- Skidmore, Mick (October 28, 1994). "Madonna Shows a Bit More Depth". The Patriot Ledger – via Newspapers.com.
- Smith, Troy L. (August 11, 2016). "Madonna's Bedtime Stories Still Radiates with Sensuality, Defiance". Cleveland.com. Archived from the original on March 22, 2019.
- Sylvester, Ron (October 28, 1994). "Madonna Comes Back to Life with Bedtime Stories". The Springfield News-Leader – via Newspapers.com.
- Violanti, Anthony (October 25, 1994). "Tries to Sound Wicked". The Buffalo News – via Newspapers.com.
