= Bedtime Stories (album) =

1994 studio album by Madonna

- Cover for international, vinyl, and digital releases (Note: Some US CD editions depict the same image upside down.)

Studio album by Madonna
- Released: October 24, 1994
- Recorded: February 1994 – August 1994
- Studios: Axis Studios; The Hit Factory; Soundworks (New York City); Chappell Studios (Los Angeles); The Music Grinder (Hollywood); DARP Studios; Tea Room (Atlanta); The Enterprise (Burbank); Wild Bunch Studios (London)
- Genres: R&B; pop
- Length: 51:50
- Labels: Maverick; Sire; Warner Bros.
- Producers: Madonna; Dallas Austin; Babyface; Dave Hall; Nellee Hooper

Madonna chronology
Erotica (1992)	Bedtime Stories (1994)	Something to Remember (1995)

Singles from Bedtime Stories
- 1. "Secret" Released: September 20, 1994; 2. "Take a Bow" Released: December 6, 1994; 3. "Bedtime Story" Released: February 13, 1995; 4. "Human Nature" Released: May 30, 1995

Bedtime Stories is the sixth studio album by American singer and songwriter Madonna. It was released on October 24, 1994, by Maverick and Sire Records. After criticism ensued following multiple sexually explicit releases in 1992 and 1993—including her album Erotica, her book Sex, and her film appearances in Body of Evidence and Dangerous Game—Madonna decided to tone these themes down for Bedtime Stories.

Attempting to venture into R&B, Madonna turned to some of the genre's most successful producers at the time: Dallas Austin, Babyface, and Dave Hall. She also recruited Nellee Hooper due to her interest in the British club scene, where genres like dub had become increasingly popular. Bedtime Stories is an R&B and pop album with influences from soul, electronic, and hip-hop music. In contrast to the lustful nature of Erotica, most songs on Bedtime Stories explore themes of romance, heartache, desire, and regret. Guitars, keyboards, programmed drums, strings, and synthesizers characterize their compositions.

Madonna promoted Bedtime Stories through television and award-show appearances, including at the American Music and Brit Awards. She canceled a concert tour due to her preparation for the film Evita (1996). Four singles supported the album. Its lead single, "Secret", peaked at number three on the US Billboard Hot 100, which the album's second single, "Take a Bow", topped for seven consecutive weeks, becoming her longest-running number-one. "Bedtime Story" and "Human Nature" became Madonna's worst-performing singles on the Billboard Hot 100 and peaked within the top ten of the UK singles chart.

Music critics appreciated Bedtime Stories for its gentler sound and embraced its R&B infusions. Others found it unremarkable compared to Madonna's previous works. It has been retrospectively viewed as one of her best and most underrated albums. Bedtime Stories topped the albums charts in Australia, reached the top five in countries like Canada, France, Germany, the United Kingdom, and the United States, and has sold over eight million copies worldwide. It received a nomination for Best Pop Album at the 38th Annual Grammy Awards.

== Background ==
Madonna explored homophobia, queerness, and sexuality in her fifth studio album, Erotica (1992). Released the same day, her coffee table book titled Sex contains adult content—such as softcore pornography—and simulations of sexual acts like sadomasochism. She appeared in two films in 1993: an erotic thriller, Body of Evidence, and a drama film, Dangerous Game. The following year, Madonna made a highly publicized appearance on the Late Show with David Letterman; she used profanity that required broadcast censorship and handed the host, David Letterman, a pair of her underwear while urging him to smell it.

Critics reacted negatively to the erotic nature of her album, book, films, and television appearance and thought Madonna had become overreliant being sexual. Feeling misinterpreted, Madonna stated: "I tried to make a statement about feeling good about yourself and exploring your sexuality, but people took it to mean that everyone should go out and have sex with everyone, and that I was going to be the leader of that." Maverick and Sire Records issued the pop ballad "I'll Remember" in March 1994. Part of the soundtrack for the film With Honors, the single became one of Madonna's best-performing and received a rave critical reception.

Some commentators viewed "I'll Remember" as Madonna's first attempt at alleviating the public's perception of her. Hip-hop, R&B, and soul music began to dominate American music charts by the start of the 1990s. Intrigued by trends, Madonna wanted these genres to be incorporated into her sixth studio album, Bedtime Stories. According to her, she chose to explore R&B to go "back to her roots", as her debut studio album, Madonna (1983), had influences from the genre.

== Writing and recording ==
Once [Madonna] got her ideas out, she was open to your ideas. You didn't want to go in with her and right off the bat say, "Well, I hear this," because she was so specific and articulate. She already had the sound in her head. But after she'd spoken, we'd put our two cents in. We always had ideas, like, 'Can we answer this line with an extra "survival" [in the background]?'".

— Backup singer Donna De Lory on working with Madonna on Bedtime Stories.

Madonna began the recording sessions for Bedtime Stories with Shep Pettibone, with whom she had worked for the 1990 single "Vogue" and Erotica. After the two had created some demos, Madonna stopped collaborating with him upon realizing they were beginning to resemble the dance-oriented sound of Erotica. She instead turned to high-profile producers and songwriters for Bedtime Stories. It was the first time she did so since she worked with Nile Rodgers for her second studio album, Like a Virgin (1984). According to biographer J. Randy Taraborrelli, Madonna previously chose to work with producers of little fame for "reasons that were as much about creativity as they were about control".

After becoming a fan of his single "When Can I See You" (1994), Madonna developed an interest in working with Babyface as she pursued "lush" ballads for the album. Working from a studio Babyface built in his Beverly Hills home, the pair wrote and composed the music for three songs, two of which—"Take a Bow" and "Forbidden Love"—appear on the album. Before Madonna's arrival, Babyface had created the beat and chords for "Take a Bow", which they expanded on after she came. He described developing "Forbidden Love" as an easy process: "She heard the basic track and it all started coming out, melodies and everything". Babyface stated that he was "in awe of the fact that I was working with [her]. It was initially surreal, but then you get to know the person a little bit, and you calm down and then it's just work. And work is fun".

Madonna became intrigued by the production of Joi's debut studio album, The Pendulum Vibe (1994), and wanted to know who produced it. After she and Babyface finished their sessions, he introduced her to Dallas Austin, a producer who worked on The Pendulum Vibe and initially garnered publicity for his work with the girl group TLC. Their collaborations generated three songs: "Secret", "Don't Stop", and "Sanctuary". Madonna first began developing "Secret" as a demo with Pettibone titled "Something's Coming Over Me". Austin revised the composition entirely; for biographer Lucy O'Brien, he elicited a soulful tone in Madonna's voice. Having enjoyed his work on Mariah Carey's "Dreamlover" (1993), Madonna recruited Dave Hall for Bedtime Stories and spent a fortnight with him at his Elmsford, New York, studio. They wrote four songs together—"I'd Rather Be Your Lover", "Inside of Me", "Human Nature", and "Love Tried to Welcome Me"; he co-produced all but "Inside of Me". (Note: Madonna produced "Inside of Me" with Nellee Hooper, as explained below.)

After collaborating with R&B songwriters and producers, Madonna sought more genres to incorporate into Bedtime Stories. The British club scene appealed to her, as genres like dub had become increasingly popular through such acts as Icelandic singer Björk, as well as British bands Massive Attack and Soul II Soul. Appreciating his "European sensibility", Madonna recruited producer Nellee Hooper and his assistant programmer, Marius de Vries. Sessions occurred at Chappell Studios in Encino, California, where Hooper and Madonna co-produced four songs: "Survival", "Inside of Me", "Forbidden Love", and "Bedtime Story". Björk wrote the lyrics to "Bedtime Story" after Madonna—a fan of her album Debut (1993)—contacted her and asked her to write a track. Interested in hearing Madonna say "the things I have always wanted to hear her say that she's never said", Björk wrote a demo in one day, titling it "Let's Get Unconscious". De Vries and Hooper rearranged it, and it was renamed "Bedtime Story".

== Composition ==
=== Music and lyrics ===
"Secret" (1994)
Throughout "Secret", Madonna sings in her lower vocal register. Drum beats accompany the song beginning with the first chorus.

"Bedtime Story" (1995)
"Bedtime Story" is an electronic track that delves into acid house, new-age, and Sufi music. Music critics thought it foreshadowed her move towards electronica with Ray of Light (1998).

An R&B and pop album, Bedtime Stories is influenced by soul, electronic, and hip-hop music. With a radio-friendly sound, Bedtime Stories was described by some critics as Madonna's attempt to adapt to what was in vogue at the time. In contrast, Al Shipley of Spin argued that her decision to incorporate R&B elements was to sing midtempo songs that were subtle and seductive rather than to sound contemporary. The songs' compositions are characterized by guitars, keyboards, programmed drums, pulsating basslines, strings, and synthesizers.

Wanting the album to be cohesive, Madonna paid specific attention to the sequencing of the songs on Bedtime Stories. In contrast to the sexual nature of Erotica, the tracks of Bedtime Stories explore themes such as romance, heartache, desire, and regret. They were inspired by themes Madonna had been eager to write and felt ready to pursue; according to Madonna, they deal with having one's heart broken and the sadness of losing a loved one. Some tracks explore different topics: "Survival" and "Human Nature" respond to the criticism she faced over Erotica and Sex, while "Bedtime Story" is about the pleasures of unconsciousness.

=== Songs ===
Bedtime Stories opens with "Survival", an R&B, pop, and dance-pop track. Inspired by the backlash Madonna garnered because of Sex and Erotica, its lyrics deal with maintaining resilience and persevering while facing criticism. They reference her 1986 single "Live to Tell": "Whether it's heaven or hell / I'm gonna be living to tell". The second track, "Secret", is a pop and R&B track with influences from hip-hop and soul. The song's instrumentation includes acoustic guitar, wah-wah sounds, strings, and drum machines. Themed on spirituality and self-empowerment, "Secret" concerns the narrator's lover keeping a secret and her realization of one's happiness lying in one's own hands. Madonna's alto voice is husky and pitched to a lower register.

New jack swing, hip-hop, and soul elements characterize "I'd Rather Be Your Lover". Backed by drums, a bass guitar and funky basslines, it contains a sample of Lou Donaldson's 1969 cover of the Isley Brothers' "It's Your Thing". Its lyrics depict the narrator's yearning to be closer to a man in any form of relationship—his sister, mother, friend, or brother—but states that she would rather be his lover. Meshell Ndegeocello provides bass and an eight-bar rap. The song was recorded as a duet with rapper Tupac Shakur; Madonna chose to replace his parts with a verse by Ndegeocello due to his involvement in a sexual assault case at the time. The fourth track, "Don't Stop", is a synthesizer-backed dance track with hip-hop influences. Its lyrics are relatively simple; the narrator asks someone to join the dance floor and groove.

"Inside of Me" is an R&B track that incorporates a throbbing bassline, guitar, keyboards, sustained strings, and a repeated saxophone sample. It samples "Outstanding" (1984) by the Gap Band, "Back & Forth" (1994) by Aaliyah, and "The Trials of Life" (1994) by Gutter Snypes. Madonna's vocals are breathy and restrained on "Inside of Me", which critics have referred to as both a ballad and slow jam. Its lyrics lament the death of her mother, who died when Madonna was five; some commentators interpreted them as being about a former lover. In the hip-hop–influenced R&B song "Human Nature", Madonna responds to those who criticized her for her sexually explicit 1992–1993 releases. It is supported by heavy basslines and looping drums; she sings the lines "Oops, I didn't know I couldn't talk about sex" and "Oops, I didn't know I couldn't speak my mind" in a thin, nasal voice.

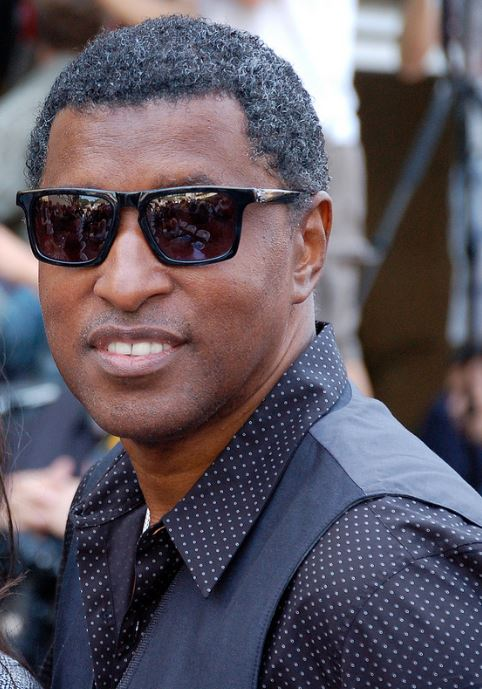
Babyface provides background vocals on "Forbidden Love" and "Take a Bow".

Influenced by R&B and soul music and composed in a minor key, the seventh track, "Forbidden Love", is a sentimental ballad featuring sparse instrumentation and background vocals from Babyface. Strings that appear during the bridge give the track a brighter tone. In its lyrics, the narrator compares rejection to an aphrodisiac and expresses disinterest in relationships that lack taboo. Madonna was inspired to write "Love Tried to Welcome Me" after meeting a stripper at a club. It features strings, acoustic guitar, drum machines and wind chimes. The samba-inflected ballad describes the narrator's questioning of why she cannot accept love; she wonders if her lustful and sinful past is a contributing factor to this.

The techno- and electronica-imbued "Sanctuary" quotes Walt Whitman's poem Vocalism and a passage from the Book of Genesis, and samples the composition "Watermelon Man" (1962) by Herbie Hancock. (Note: Attributed to multiple sources:) The lyrics intertwine themes of attraction and death, concerning a lover who provides the narrator with refuge from a troubled world. Featuring Madonna's soft and breathy vocal delivery, the song incorporates electric guitar and restrained strings. "Sanctuary" segues into the album's tenth track, "Bedtime Story". Acid house and new-age music tinge the ambient dance and electronic track, whose instrumentation is provided by synthesizers, drum machines, and programmed hand claps. Its lyrics delve into the pleasures of unconsciousness.

Bedtime Stories closes with the pop, R&B, and soul ballad "Take a Bow". Its composition contains synthesizers and pentatonic string arragements. At Madonna's suggestion, live strings were used in its production—the first time Babyface, who also provided background vocals, worked with them. Its lyrics are about a lover to whom the narrator says goodbye for taking her for granted. The title plays on the verse in the song, "All the world is a stage / And everyone has their part". It references the line by William Shakespeare in his play As You Like It: "All the world's a stage / And all the men and women merely players".

== Promotion ==
=== Artwork and title ===
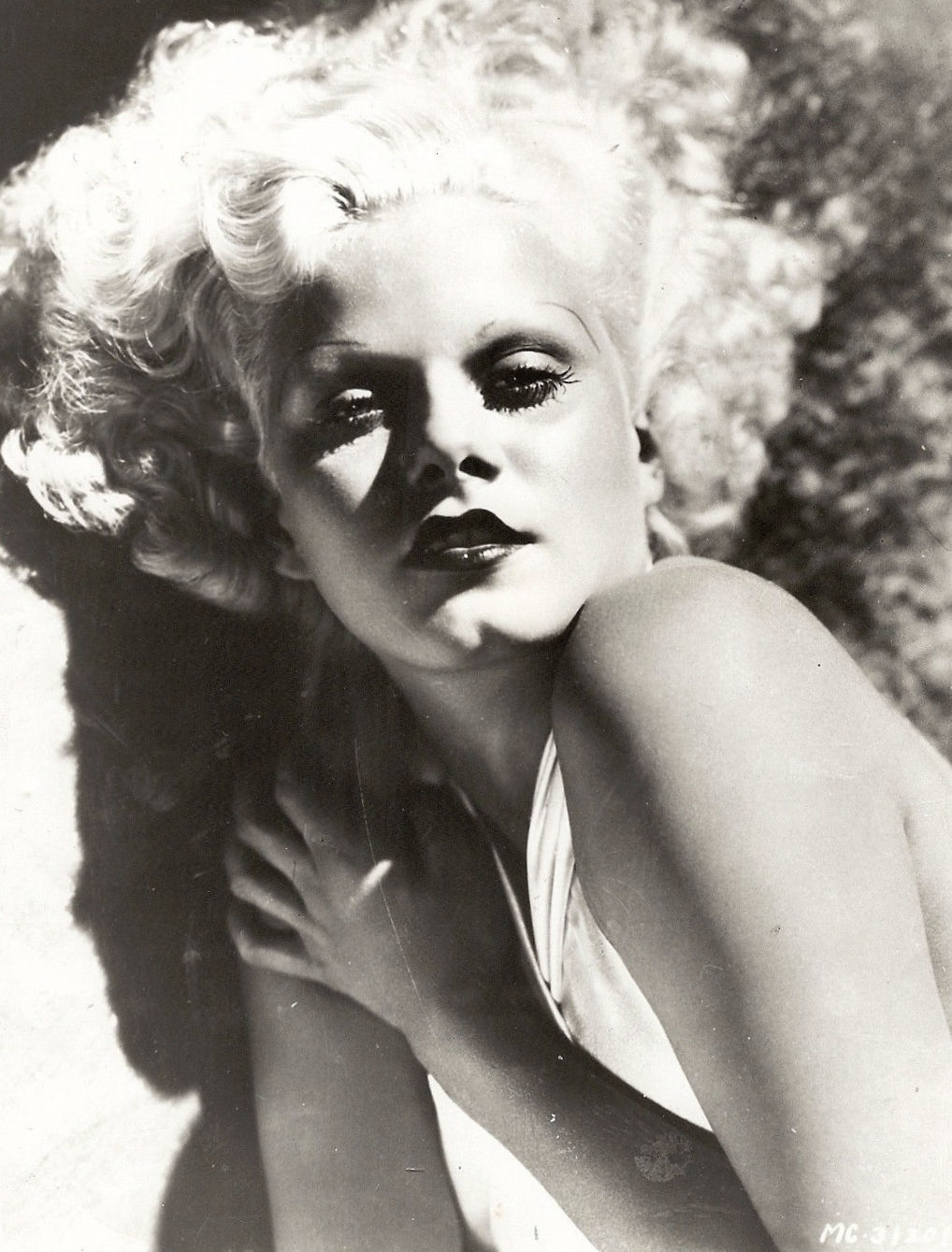
Madonna's appearance on the cover for Bedtime Stories garnered comparisons to actress Jean Harlow's (pictured).

After finishing the album's tenth track, "Bedtime Story", Madonna conceived the title Bedtime Stories; she thought the songs resembled bedtime stories and likened them to a tale. She initially reconsidered the title, believing it could be interpreted as sexually suggestive and increase her vulnerability to slut-shaming. After some thought, Madonna eventually relinquished the idea and deemed Bedtime Stories a beautiful title. Viewing the title as a pun, academic Georges-Claude Guilbert thought it referred to erotic stories told at bedtime, but regarded the album itself as "a book of stories you can tell your kids at bedtime [...] sexuality explained to children".

French photographer Patrick Demarchelier shot the artwork for Bedtime Stories at the Eden Roc Miami Beach Hotel in August 1994. Madonna worked with hairstylist Sam McKnight for the pictures, which Fabien Baron and Patrick Li directed. The low-key photoshoot featured fewer than fifty people and was completed quickly, as Madonna had to attend her birthday party afterward. The cover depicts her wearing a white negligee; her blonde hair is tousled, and she sports a nose ring. Critics compared her appearance to Jean Harlow's; some believed she inspired Madonna's look. Journalist Paul Du Noyer thought her look recalled Hollywood actresses of the 1930s and 1970s.

=== Release and promotional appearances ===
In its September 17, 1994, issue, Billboard announced that Bedtime Stories would be released on October 25. It also stated that Warner Bros. Records—in partnership with America Online and CompuServe—would preview the album via the Internet. Those subscribed to either computer service could hear a thirty-second portion of its lead single, "Secret", a week before it was issued to radio, and view album information and artwork. Madonna also left a recorded message. In retrospect, Billboard deemed it a prescient publicity move; it occurred when less than fifteen percent of adults had Internet access. Sire and Warner Bros. Records released Bedtime Stories in the United Kingdom on October 24, and in the United States a day later.

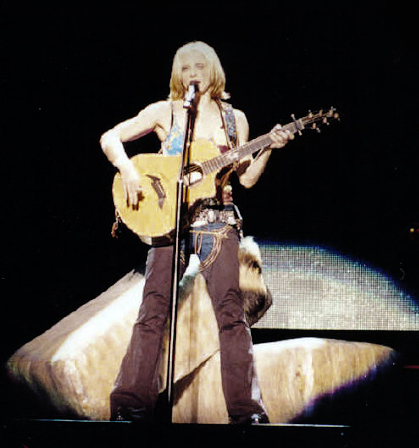
Madonna performing the album's lead single, "Secret", during the Drowned World Tour (2001).

A promotional advertisement aired on television channels featuring Madonna proclaiming that there would be no sexual references on Bedtime Stories: "It's a whole new me! I'm going to be a good girl, I swear." As part of the promotional tour for the album, she engaged in an interview with Ruby Wax in Paris. Wax criticized her own handling of the interview; intimidated by Madonna's entourage, she began to ask questions to the singer that she felt did not make sense. With Babyface, Madonna performed "Take a Bow" at the American Music Awards on January 30, 1995, alongside a live orchestra. Both Babyface and Madonna were nervous while onstage. Billboard named it the eighth greatest performance at the award show of all time.

On February 13, 1995, Madonna appeared on the Late Show with David Letterman to apologize for her appearance a year prior. She performed "Secret" and "Take a Bow" on the German television show Wetten, dass..? five days later. Donning a long white dress and waist-length hair extensions, she sang "Bedtime Story" at the Brit Awards on February 20. Three male dancers joined her. Two days later, Madonna performed "Take a Bow" again at the Sanremo Music Festival with Babyface. She held a "pajama party" at Webster Hall in New York City to promote the music video for the album's single "Bedtime Story". Broadcast on MTV, it featured her reading David Kirk's book Miss Spider's Tea Party to 2,000 people while disc jockey Junior Vasquez played "Bedtime Story" remixes. (Note: Cited to multiple sources:)

After Madonna confirmed that she would perform at Sanremo in January 1995, a writer for the Italian newspaper Corriere della Sera reported that she would visit Italy as part of an international world tour. They assumed it would have taken place sometime between May and October. Madonna and her manager Freddy DeMann repealed any plans for a tour after she was offered the role of Eva Perón in Alan Parker's film Evita (1996). While her spokesperson suggested a shorter tour, Madonna stated: "I've waited years for this role, and I have to put every ounce of concentration into it. I love touring, and I very much want to go out with this album. But I can't—I'd be going straight from months on the road right into filming; I'd be exhausted and strained. It wouldn't be in the best interests of the movie for me to be at any less than my peak of energy".

=== Singles ===
Four singles supported Bedtime Stories. Sire issued "Secret" as the lead single in September 1994. Entering the US Billboard Hot 100 Singles chart at number thirty, it registered Madonna's third highest debut at the time. "Secret" peaked at number three on the chart, and the Recording Industry Association of America certified it gold. Peaking at number five, the single became her record-breaking thirty-fifth top-ten on the UK singles chart. "Secret" topped the charts in Canada, Finland, Mexico, and Switzerland, and reached the top ten in Australia, France, Iceland, Italy, New Zealand, and Spain. (Note: Sources supporting "Secret"'s number-one peaks in Canada, Finland, Mexico, and Switzerland; and its top-ten peaks in Australia; France, Iceland, Italy, New Zealand, and Spain) Melodie McDaniel directed its black-and-white music video, featuring Madonna as a nightclub jazz singer in Harlem, New York City, intercut with scenes of daily life in the neighborhood.

In December 1994, Sire released "Take a Bow" as the second single from Bedtime Stories. It topped the Billboard Hot 100, making Madonna the female songwriter with the most number-one singles. The single stayed atop the chart for seven consecutive weeks and remains her longest-running number-one. The Recording Industry Association of America certified it gold. "Take a Bow" peaked at number sixteen on the UK singles chart and broke her streak of thirty-five consecutive top-ten singles dating to 1984. Elsewhere, it topped the charts in Canada, and reached the top ten in Finland, Italy, New Zealand, and Switzerland. (Note: Sources supporting "Take a Bow"'s number-one peak in Canada; and its top-ten peaks in Finland, Italy, New Zealand, and Switzerland) Directed by Michael Haussman, the music video for "Take a Bow" depicts Madonna as a bullfighter's neglected and abused partner who yearns for his love.

"Bedtime Story" was promoted as the third single from Bedtime Stories; it was issued in February 1995 for some countries, and in March in the United States. "Survival" is included as the B-side to American physical single editions. "Bedtime Story" peaked at number forty-two on the Billboard Hot 100, making it Madonna's lowest-charting single at the time and her first not to reach the top forty since "Everybody" (1982), which topped out on the Bubbling Under Hot 100. "Bedtime Story" attained top-ten peaks in Australia, Finland, Italy, and the United Kingdom. (Note: Sources supporting "Take a Bow"'s top-ten peaks in Australia, Finland, Italy, and the United Kingdom) Its music video, which Mark Romanek directed, is one of the most expensive of all time. Influenced by such artists as Remedios Varo, Frida Kahlo, and Leonora Carrington, it features surrealistic imagery.

Sire issued "Human Nature" as the fourth single from Bedtime Stories in May 1995 for some countries, and in June for the United States. The B-side for most physical formats in the United States was "Sanctuary". "Human Nature" surpassed "Bedtime Story" as Madonna's lowest-charting single on the Billboard Hot 100, peaking at number forty-six. Elsewhere, it reached the top ten of the charts in Finland, Italy, and the United Kingdom. The music video for "Human Nature", directed by Jean-Baptiste Mondino, depicts Madonna chained up, boxed in, and restrained; she sports bondage gear.

=== Bedtime Stories: The Untold Chapter ===
Madonna announced via Instagram on February 17, 2025, that Bedtime Stories would be reissued; she did not provide a release date. In October, she posted a release date of November 28, and revealed that the set—an extended play—would be titled Bedtime Stories: The Untold Chapter. It comprised early demos, alternate remixes of the original songs, and rarities. Madonna chose Stuart Price, with whom she had collaborated on Confessions on a Dance Floor (2005), to mix and edit the original tracks. She did so to form a "cohesive new chapter". Its cover art was drawn from a 1994 photoshoot by Paolo Roversi, whose pictures were additionally used for the single artwork of "Bedtime Story".

== Critical reception ==
Contemporaneous reviews
Review scores
Source	Rating
Chicago Tribune	3/4 stars
Entertainment Weekly	B+
Los Angeles Times	2.5/4 stars
Music Week	5/5 stars
NME	9/10
Rolling Stone	3.5/5 stars
USA Today	3.5/4 stars

Retrospective reviews and music guides
Review scores
Source	Rating
AllMusic	4/5 stars
Blender	3/5 stars
MusicHound Rock	3/5 stars
Pitchfork	6.5/10
The Rolling Stone Album Guide	3.5/5 stars
Slant Magazine	4/5 stars
Spin Alternative Record Guide	4/10
Tom Hull – on the Web	B
The Virgin Encyclopedia of Nineties Music	4/5 stars

Upon release and in retrospective reviews, critical feedback toward Bedtime Stories has been generally positive. This was the case for Greg Kot ―who labeled it Madonna's "most irresistible" work since 1990's The Immaculate Collection― Edna Gundersen and Stephen Holden, who said Madonna was "at her best", and singled out its smooth, subtle, and restrained seductiveness, shifting away from Erotica's "shock tactics". (Note: Per multiple sources) Critics like Stephen Thomas Erlewine also praised Madonna for being the most "humane", "open" and "vulnerable" she had ever been. Sal Cinquemani of Slant Magazine noted that Madonna seemed "more interested in literature and human psychology than sexual biology this time around. [Bedtime Stories'] mix of sorrow and romance [...] expose a woman who might have been in need of some serious therapy". Entertainment Weekly's Jim Farber said Madonna was "telling the truth about her life" more so than on any other previous album, "with more personal mixtures of sex and romance".

Reviewers frequently discussed the album's warm and gentle sound. (Note: Per multiple sources) Cinquemani summarized Bedtime Stories as a "fluffy-pillowed concept album that unfolds like a musical fairy tale". Barbara O'Dair called the sounds "awfully compelling" in Rolling Stone's review, and Peter Galvin "gorgeously produced [...] with lots of funky beats, lush keyboards, and soaring Love Unlimited-style string arrangements" in a review for The Advocate. The grooves were described as "seriously infectious" and "deep, gently pulsating" by the staff of People magazine and Erlewine, respectively. Conversely, for Louis Virtel from The Backlot, "production [on Bedtime Stories] [is] a mess; the sheer amount of producers in the edit bay made for a hodgepodge of an album".

Its incorporations of pop, modern R&B and hip-hop popular at the time was also a focal point. Billboard claimed, "Ms. M sticks to a pop recipe that yields hits galore, with little excess baggage". The "combination of sleek R&B and slinky club music works way better than it probably should", according to Stereogum's Tom Breihan, who said Madonna "sounds comfortable, and never radiates the sweaty eagerness to please that you sometimes see from pop stars making self-consciously commercial moves". Jim Farber argued the incorporation of the Aaliyah and Xscape style of R&B was done more credibly than on Michael Jackson's Dangerous (1991). By contrast, The Plain Dealer's Troy L. Smith opined Dangerous's attempt at new jack swing was more successful.

Detractors called the record a "blurry non-event", "one amorphous blob", dispensable, flat, lifeless, and uninspired, (Note: Per multiple sources) and comparisons to other singers and previous LPs were made. El Hunt, writing for the Evening Standard, said that other female artists of the time –Janet Jackson, Toni Braxton, and Brandy– were "mining similar sounds in arguably more interesting ways". Chris Willman of the Los Angeles Times called Bedtime Stories, the "least remarkable" of Madonna's albums up to that point. For Rikky Rooksby, "[Bedtime Stories] can't match the power of Erotica, [and] it is definitely a long way behind Like a Prayer". Allen Metz and Carol Benson, authors of The Madonna Companion: Two Decades of Commentary, added that, "rather than signify[ing] some bold new direction, Bedtime Stories takes hardly any risks at all. [...] it offers neither the pop epiphany of Like a Prayer nor the shameless frolic of [Madonna's] earlier dance hits". Bedtime Stories received a nomination for Best Pop Album at the 38th Grammy Awards.

== Commercial performance ==
In the United States, Bedtime Stories debuted at number three on the Billboard 200 on November 12, 1994, with first week sales of 145,000 copies. Snoop Doggy Dogg's Murder Was the Case soundtrack, and Boyz II Men's II kept it from number one. Despite a weaker debut than Erotica, which opened at number two with sales of 167,000 copies, its chart longevity made Bedtime Stories outsell it. According to Billboard, by April 1995, following Madonna's appearance on the American Music Awards, sales of Bedtime Stories increased by 19%. With a total of 48 weeks on the Billboard 200, and over one million copies sold, Bedtime Stories came in at number 28 on Billboard's year-end chart for 1995. In November 2005, the album was certified triple platinum by the Recording Industry Association of America (RIAA) for shipments of more than three million units within the country. According to Nielsen SoundScan, Bedtime Stories has sold 2,336,000 copies as of December 2016. This figure does not include sales from music clubs such as BMG Music Clubs where it sold 195,000 copies. In Canada, Bedtime Stories debuted and peaked at number four of the RPM Albums Chart on November 7, 1994, and was eventually certified two times platinum by Music Canada (MC) for shipments of 200,000 copies.

In Brazil, sales of the album exceeded 380,000 units by February 1996, which earned it a platinum certification by the Associação Brasileira dos Produtores de Discos (ABPD). In Argentina, the Cámara Argentina de Productores de Fonogramas y Videogramas (CAPIF) certified the album double platinum, which denotes the shipment of 120,000 copies in the country. Bedtime Stories debuted at number two on the UK Albums Chart on November 5, 1994. It was held off the top by Bon Jovi's Cross Road, and remained a total of 30 weeks on the chart. Bedtime Stories was certified platinum by the British Phonographic Industry (BPI) for shipments of 300,000 copies. It also reached number two in France, Finland, Italy, and Portugal. The album was a number four hit in Germany, remaining 37 weeks on the German Albums Chart, and received a platinum certification by Bundesverband Musikindustrie (BVMI) after moving in excess of 500,000 copies in the country. Bedtime Stories reached number two on the European Top 100 Albums chart, and has sold over two million copies across Europe.

In Australia, the album entered the ARIA chart at number one, and was certified double platinum by the Australian Recording Industry Association (ARIA) for shipments of 140,000 copies. In New Zealand, Bedtime Stories debuted and peaked at number five on November 20, before dropping to number 16 the following week. The album reached number nine on Japan's Oricon album chart, and received a platinum certification by the Recording Industry Association of Japan (RIAJ). Worldwide, Bedtime Stories has sold over eight million copies.

== Legacy ==
"Beyond offering Madonna's final word on the scandal of her sexuality, [Bedtime Stories] pivots to address the misconception that her sexual persona limited her versatility as an artist [...] [it] prove[s] that [she] owned her sexuality and would not be eclipsed by it".

— Mary Von Aue commenting on the album.

Bedtime Stories has been referred to as one of the best albums of 1994, and the 1990s decade. In Vice, Mary Von Aue deemed it Madonna's most important work; she said that, although it was marketed as an "apology" for her sexually explicit behavior, she instead offered a "lyrical #sorrynotsorry and a response to the problem of female musicians being scrutinized for their sexuality rather than their music". Despite not being "the first album that comes to mind when discussing Madonna's legacy", Bedtime Stories is the "most relevant to many of the cultural conversations that are still happening. Had she acquiesced to the public's call for apology, it could have set a dangerous standard for how the public can decree an artist's silence, and it would have allowed the categories for female singers to remain in place", concluded Von Aue.

Stan Hawkins from the University of Leeds saw the record as a "significant point of arrival in [Madonna's] maturity by planting her firmly within new realms of production, performance, and songwriting". According to Idolator's Bianca Gracie, "Bedtime Stories displayed the evolution of a soulful singer [...] [it] proved that Madonna never lost her edge; she just decided to soften it so that her image could regroup". For Peter Piatkowski, the "peak of respectability" Madonna reached in the mid-to-late 1990s with Evita and Ray of Light (1998), began with the "more conciliatory image and sound" she adopted for Bedtime Stories. From Philadelphia magazine, Patrick DeMarco opined that, "it's not just the insatiable pure-pop moments laced throughout [Bedtime Stories] that make it great. This is the record that cemented Madonna as the icon we know today", as it saw her working with the producers that would help "define her sound" for the next decade. In this vein, the staff of Billboard said that Bedtime Stories found Madonna "in transition, swiveling away from explicit sexuality and relying on R&B and balladry before she dove headfirst into dance music four years later", a sentiment that was echoed by Troy L. Smith.

According to Quentin Harrison from music website Albumism, the "genesis of [Madonna's] second career epoch"―Ray of Light, Music (2000), and American Life (2003)―began with Bedtime Stories, an album "meant to be experienced in its entirety [...] that eschewed controversy and platformed Madonna's singular abilities as a singer and songwriter". Bianca Gracie also perceived traces of the record on Madonna's eleventh studio album Hard Candy (2008), and in the work of contemporary female singers like Rihanna, Banks, Jhené Aiko, and Tinashe. According to Scottish musician Sophie, who collaborated with Madonna on 2015's "Bitch I'm Madonna", "[Bedtime Stories] is so much more fully formed and sexy than a lot of the trip-hop stuff that was coming out around that time. It's definitely been an influence on my own music". While Mike Wass from Idolator felt Bedtime Stories helped create the "blueprint for the Pop Girl R&B crossover", Gay Times' Sam Damshenas and Daniel Megarry concluded that, "listened to in the current musical landscape, [the album] sounds remarkably current – more so than any other early-to-mid Madonna release".

Bedtime Stories has been considered one of Madonna's most underrated and overlooked works, due to it being "sandwiched between her most controversial (Erotica) and, arguably, her best (Ray of Light)", according to Smith. More than 25 years after its release, in April 2020, Madonna fanbase launched #JusticeForBedtimeStories, a social media campaign that caused it to reach number one on the iTunes albums chart. According to Luminate, a little over 1,000 physical copies of the album were sold in the week ending April 30. Madonna herself acknowledged the campaign and thanked her fans for their support.

== Track listing ==
Bedtime Stories track listing
No.	Title	Writer(s)	Producer(s)	Length
1.	"Survival"	Madonna; Dallas Austin	Nellee Hooper; Madonna	3:31
2.	"Secret"	Madonna; Austin	Madonna; Austin	5:05
3.	"I'd Rather Be Your Lover" (with Meshell Ndegeocello)	Madonna; Dave Hall; Isley Brothers; Christopher Jasper	Madonna; Hall	4:39
4.	"Don't Stop"	Madonna; Austin; Colin Wolfe	Madonna; Austin; Daniel Abraham^{[a]}^{[b]}	4:38
5.	"Inside of Me"	Madonna; Hall; Hooper	Hooper; Madonna	4:11
6.	"Human Nature"	Madonna; Hall; Shawn McKenzie; Kevin McKenzie; Michael Deering	Madonna; Hall	4:54
7.	"Forbidden Love"	Babyface; Madonna	Hooper; Madonna	4:08
8.	"Love Tried to Welcome Me"	Madonna; Hall	Madonna; Hall	5:21
9.	"Sanctuary"	Madonna; Austin; Anne Preven; Scott Cutler; Herbie Hancock	Madonna; Austin; Hooper^{[a]}	5:02
10.	"Bedtime Story"	Hooper; Björk Guðmundsdóttir; Marius De Vries	Hooper; Madonna	4:53
11.	"Take a Bow"	Babyface; Madonna	Babyface; Madonna	5:21
Total length:				51:50

=== Notes ===
- ^{^[a]} signifies a remixer
- ^{^[b]} signifies an additional producer

=== Sample credits ===
- "I'd Rather Be Your Lover" contains samples of "It's Your Thing" performed by Lou Donaldson (originally by The Isley Brothers).
- "Inside of Me" samples "Back & Forth" performed by Aaliyah, "Outstanding" performed by The Gap Band and "The Trials of Life" performed by Gutter Snypes.
- "Human Nature" features samples of "What You Need" performed by Main Source.
- "Forbidden Love" contains samples of "Down Here on the Ground" performed by Grant Green.
- "Sanctuary" samples "Watermelon Man" performed by Herbie Hancock.

== Personnel ==
Credits adapted from the album's liner notes.

=== Musicians and technical ===
- Madonna – vocals, production, composition
- Daniel Abraham – audio mixing
- Craig Armstrong – string arrangement
- Dallas Austin – drums, keyboard, production, composition
- Babyface – background vocals, synthesizer, production, composition
- Björk – composition
- Donna De Lory – background vocals
- Marius de Vries – production
- Michael Fossenkemper – engineering
- Jon Gass – audio mixing
- Brad Gilderman – engineering
- Dave "Jam" Hall – production
- Niki Haris – background vocals
- Nellee Hooper – production
- Jessie Leavey – string arrangement
- Tomi Martin – guitar
- Meshell Ndegeocello – guest vocals, bass
- Darin Prindle – engineering
- Alvin Speights – engineering
- Mark "Spike" Stent – engineering
- Colin Wolfe – bass

=== Design ===
- Baron & Baron Inc. – design, art direction
- Patrick Demarchelier – photography
- Siung Fat Tjia – art direction, design

=== Recording ===
- Recorded at Axis Studios, The Hit Factory, and Soundworks (New York City); Chappell Studios (Los Angeles); DARP Studios and Tea Room (Atlanta); The Enterprise (Burbank); The Music Grinder (Hollywood); and Wild Bunch Studios (London).
- Mastering at Sterling Sound (New York City).

== Charts ==
=== Weekly charts ===
Weekly chart performance for Bedtime Stories
Chart (1994–95)	Peak position
Argentine Albums (CAPIF)	4
Australian Albums (ARIA)	1
Austrian Albums (Ö3 Austria)	7
Belgian Albums (IFPI / SABAM)	7
Brazilian Albums (Nopem/ABPD)	5
Canada Top Albums/CDs (RPM)	4
Dutch Albums (Album Top 100)	13
European Top 100 Albums (Music & Media)	2
Finnish Albums (IFPI Finland)	2
French Albums (SNEP)	2
German Albums (Offizielle Top 100)	4
Hungarian Albums (MAHASZ)	7
Icelandic Albums (Tónlist)	6
Irish Albums (IFPI Ireland)	9
Italian Albums (Musica e dischi)	2
Japanese Albums (Oricon)	9
New Zealand Albums (RMNZ)	5
Portuguese Albums (AFP)	2
Scottish Albums (Official Charts)	3
South African Albums (RISA)	12
Spanish Albums (PROMUSICAE)	5
Swedish Albums (Sverigetopplistan)	5
Swiss Albums (Schweizer Hitparade)	7
UK Albums (Official Charts)	2
US Billboard 200	3
US Top 100 Pop Albums (Cash Box)	2

2025 weekly chart performance for Bedtime Stories
Chart (2025)	Peak position
Austrian Albums (Ö3 Austria)	17
Belgian Albums (Ultratop Flanders)	27
Belgian Albums (Ultratop Wallonia)	29
Croatian International Albums (HDU)	4
Dutch Albums (Album Top 100)	63
German Albums (Offizielle Top 100)	30
German Pop Albums (Offizielle Top 100)	15
Italian Albums (FIMI)	32
Japanese Western Albums (Oricon)	18
Japanese Top Albums Sales (Billboard Japan)	51
Polish Albums (ZPAV)	83
Scottish Albums (Official Charts)	10
Swiss Albums (Schweizer Hitparade)	24
UK Albums (Official Charts)	62

=== Year-end charts ===
1994 year-end chart performance for Bedtime Stories
Chart (1994)	Position
Australian Albums (ARIA)	36
Canada Top Albums/CDs (RPM)	48
European Top 100 Albums (Music & Media)	49
Finnish Albums (Suomen virallinen lista)	29
French Albums (SNEP)	44
UK Albums (OCC)	24

1995 year-end chart performance for Bedtime Stories
Chart (1995)	Position
Austrian Albums (Ö3 Austria)	50
Belgian Albums (Ultratop Wallonia)	53
Canada Top Albums/CDs (RPM)	41
European Top 100 Albums (Music & Media)	33
German Albums (Offizielle Top 100)	25
Swiss Albums (Schweizer Hitparade)	29
US Billboard 200	28
US Cash Box Albums	30

== Certifications and sales ==
Sales certifications for Bedtime Stories
Region	Certification	Certified units/sales
Argentina (CAPIF)	2× Platinum	120,000^{^}
Australia (ARIA)	2× Platinum	140,000^{^}
Austria (IFPI Austria)	Gold	25,000^{*}
Belgium (BRMA)	Gold	25,000^{*}
Brazil (Pro-Música Brasil)	Platinum	447,000 (Note: Estimated sales for Bedtime Stories in Brazil, as of 1998. It sold 380,000 copies in 1994 alone.)
Canada (Music Canada)	2× Platinum	250,000 (Note: Canadian sales as of January 1995.)
France (SNEP)	2× Gold	200,000^{*}
Germany (BVMI)	Platinum	500,000^{^}
Hong Kong	—	60,000 (Note: Sales in Hong Kong for Bedtime Stories as of 1995.)
India	—	50,000 (Note: Sales in India for Bedtime Stories as of 1996.)
Israel	—	10,000 (Note: Sales for Bedtime Stories in Israel as of 2001.)
Italy (FIMI)	2× Platinum	210,000 (Note: Italian sales for first two-months (as of January 1995).)
Japan (RIAJ)	Platinum	294,790
Singapore	—	50,000 (Note: Sales for Bedtime Stories in Singapore as of 1996.)
South Africa (RISA)	Platinum	50,000^{*}
Spain (Promusicae)	Platinum	100,000^{^}
South Korea	—	50,000 (Note: Sales of more than 50,000 units for Bedtime Stories in South Korea as of July 1995.)
Switzerland (IFPI Switzerland)	Gold	25,000^{^}
United Kingdom (BPI)	Platinum	300,000^{^}
United States (RIAA)	3× Platinum	2,531,000 (Note: US sales as of December 2016)
Summaries
Europe (IFPI)	2× Platinum	2,000,000^{*}
Worldwide	—	8,000,000
^{*} Sales figures based on certification alone.^{^} Shipments figures based on certification alone.

== See also ==
- List of number-one albums in Australia during the 1990s

== Sources ==
- Bego, Mark (2000). Madonna: Blonde Ambition. Cooper Square Press. ISBN 978-0-8154-1051-5.
- Bronson, Fred (2003). The Billboard Book of Number 1 Hits. Billboard Books. ISBN 0-8230-7677-6.
- Clerc, Benoît (2026). Madonna: All The Songs. Octopus Publishing Group. ISBN 978-1-7884-0635-2.
- Feldman, Christopher G. (2000). The Billboard Book of #2 Singles. Billboard Books. ISBN 0-8230-7695-4.
- Guilbert, Georges-Claude (2002). Madonna as Postmodern Myth. McFarland. ISBN 0-7864-1408-1.
- Hawkins, Stan (2017). Settling the Pop Score: Pop Texts and Identity Politics. Taylor & Francis. ISBN 978-1-351-54909-7.
- Metz, Allen; Benson, Carol (1999). The Madonna Companion: Two Decades of Commentary. Music Sales Group. ISBN 978-0-8256-7194-4.
- Morgan, Michelle (2015). Madonna. Hachette. ISBN 978-1472119438.
- O'Brien, Lucy (2008). Madonna: Like an Icon. Bantam Press. ISBN 978-0-593-05547-2.
- Pennanen, Timo (2006). Sisältää hitin. Otava. ISBN 951-1-21053-X.
- Power, Terri (2015). Shakespeare and Gender in Practice. Bloomsbury Publishing. doi:10.1007/978-1-137-40854-9. ISBN 978-1-137-40854-9.
- Pytlik, Mark (2003). Björk: Wow and Flutter. ECW Press. ISBN 978-0-8195-6514-3.
- Rettenmund, Matthew (2016). Encyclopedia Madonnica 20. Boyculture Publications. ISBN 978-0-692-51557-0.
- Roberts, David (2004). British Hit Singles & Albums. Guinness World Records. ISBN 0-85112-199-3.
- Rooksby, Rikky (2004). The Complete Guide to the Music of Madonna. Omnibus Press. ISBN 978-0-7119-9883-4.
- Taraborrelli, J. Randy (2002). Madonna: An Intimate Biography. Simon & Schuster. ISBN 978-0-7432-2880-0.
- Vernallis, Carol (2004). Experiencing Music Video: Aesthetics and Cultural Context. Columbia University Press. ISBN 978-0-231-50845-2.
