= Bedtime Story (Madonna song) =

1995 single by Madonna

Single by Madonna

from the album Bedtime Stories
- B-side: "Survival"
- Released: February 13, 1995
- Recorded: 1994
- Studio: Chappell (Encino, California)
- Genre: Electronic; ambient dance
- Length: 4:53
- Label: Maverick; Sire; Warner Bros.
- Songwriters: Björk; Nellee Hooper; Marius De Vries
- Producers: Madonna; Nellee Hooper

Madonna singles chronology
"Take a Bow" (1994)	"Bedtime Story" (1995)	"Human Nature" (1995)

Music video
- "Bedtime Story" on YouTube

"Bedtime Story" is a song by American singer Madonna from her sixth studio album, Bedtime Stories (1994). It was issued as the album's third single; it was released in Australia and some European countries on February 13, 1995, and in the United States in March. The song was written by Icelandic singer Björk, and British producers Nellee Hooper and Marius De Vries. Madonna was a fan of Björk's Debut album and, through Hooper, got in contact with her and asked her to collaborate on a song. Not being a big fan of Madonna's work, Björk was initially reluctant at the idea, but eventually accepted. She based the lyrics on ideas and concepts she had always wanted to hear Madonna say, and recorded a demo alongside Hooper. Originally titled "Let's Get Unconscious", the demo was re-worked and produced by Madonna and Hooper, who also changed its name to "Bedtime Story".

Unlike the rest of the parent album, which leans towards adult contemporary music, "Bedtime Story" is an electronic song with ambient, dance, acid house and new-age tones. Its lyrics talk about the joys of unconsciousness. Official remixes were commissioned by British duo Orbital, and American DJ Junior Vasquez. Critics reacted positively towards "Bedtime Story", praising its sound and deeming it a highlight from the album. In retrospective reviews, it has been referred to as one of Madonna's most underrated singles, and the one that foreshadowed her move towards electronic music in her subsequent work.

Peaking at number 42 on the Billboard Hot 100, "Bedtime Story" became Madonna's lowest-charting single in the US; nonetheless, it became Madonna's seventeenth number one on the Hot Dance Club Play chart. The single fared better in the United Kingdom, where it reached the top-ten. Directed by Mark Romanek, the music video for "Bedtime Story" had a budget of US$5 million (US$10.56 million in 2025), making it one of the most expensive of all time. It features surrealistic and new age imagery, with influences from artists such as Remedios Varo, Frida Kahlo and Leonora Carrington. The visual was lauded by critics and is permanently displayed at the Museum of Modern Art in New York City. Madonna performed "Bedtime Story" live at the 1995 Brit Awards, and almost thirty years later on the Celebration Tour (2023―2024). A remix was used as video interlude on 2004's Re-Invention World Tour.

== Background and recording ==
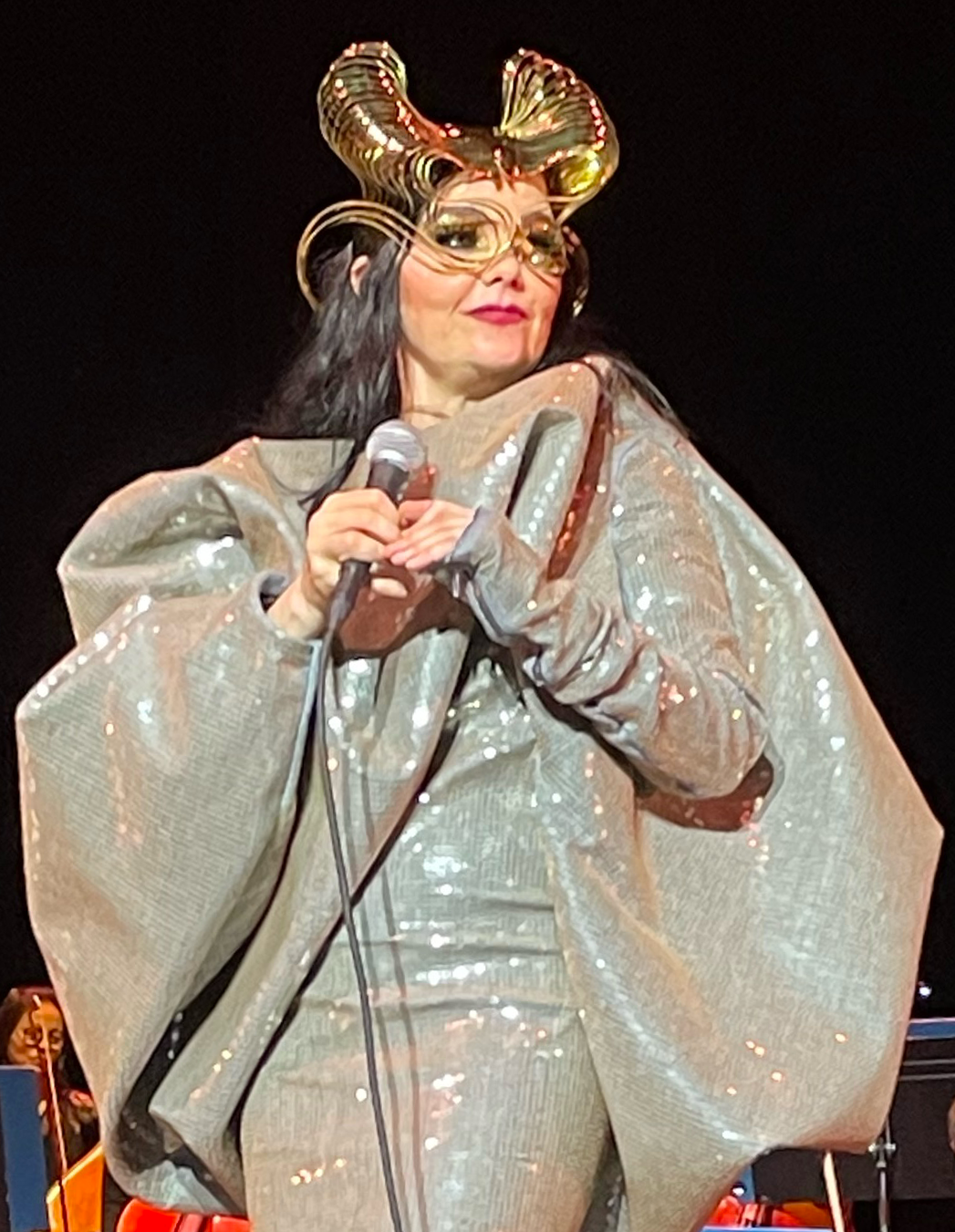
Icelandic singer Björk (picture), one of the composers of "Bedtime Story".

For her sixth studio album Bedtime Stories (1994), Madonna decided to venture in the R&B and hip hop mania that was dominating the charts in the early-to-mid 1990s. The project saw her collaborating with some of the genre's "heavyweights", including Babyface, Dallas Austin, and Dave Hall. According to author Lucy O'Brien, although Madonna was "anxious" to make an impact in the R&B market, "her voice just wasn't powerful enough to hold and bend those deep, soulful notes". Needing another "flavor" to expand on the album, the singer turned to the British club scene, where genres such as dub had been growing in popularity thanks to acts like Icelandic singer Björk, and British bands Massive Attack and Soul II Soul. Madonna got in touch with British producer Nellee Hooper, who'd worked with the three forementioned acts. It was through Hooper that Madonna got in contact with Björk; "[W]hen I first met Nellee, I told him that I loved the Björk record (Debut) and that I was a big fan of hers. He said it was mutual and the two of us should meet and maybe we could write a song together. I loved the idea".

Björk, by her part, did not consider herself a big fan of Madonna's music. When approached by Madonna's team, she initially hesitated; "[My] instinct was to [say] no. I respect [her], but it just didn't feel right". She eventually accepted, feeling "intrigued" by the offer. The lyrics were born out of "[Björk's] own criticism of Madonna's aesthetic", as noted by author Mark Pytlik. "I thought of a collection of words that I have always wanted to hear [Madonna] say", the singer recalled. She was touring Europe at the time, but came up with an idea built around the phrase "Let's get unconscious". In one day, Björk wrote the lyrics while Hooper put together the music. During a 2001 interview with Nylon magazine, Björk herself explained:

I think at the time, yes, ['Let's Get Unconscious'] was what I wanted to hear from [Madonna's] mouth. But that's like six years ago, when everything about her seemed very controlled. I think she's a very intuitive person, and definitely her survival instinct are incredible. They're like, outrageous. At the time, the words I thought she'd say were, 'I'm not using words anymore, let's get unconscious honey. Fuck logic. Just to be intuitive. Be more free. Go with the flow'. Right now, she seems pretty much to be going with the flow".

A demo was put together in London by Björk, Hooper and his assistant Marius De Vries, and then sent to Madonna, who "immediately fell in love with the words". Afterwards, Hooper and De Vries flew to Los Angeles to meet with Madonna and begin recording sessions for Bedtime Stories. They reworked the demo, turning it into a "whole new track that was more like a club record. We also re-structured the words", recalled the singer. The song's name was also changed, from "Let's Get Unconscious" to "Bedtime Story". It was recorded at Los Angeles' Chappel Studios. Personnel working on the song included Frederick Jorio and P. Dennis Mitchell on mixing, while Joey Moskowitz was in charge of programming. Björk later confessed that Madonna had got few of the lyrics wrong — the original said learning logic and reason, which Madonna mistook and sang as leaving logic and reason.

== Composition ==
'Bedtime Story'
21-second sample of "Bedtime Story". Madonna sings over a "strobe-like organ riff" the line Words are useless, how could they explain how I feel?/Traveling, traveling, in the arms of unconsciousness.

In The Complete Guide to the Music of Madonna, Rikky Rooksby described "Bedtime Story" as Madonna's "most artificial ambient dance track". It has been noted an electronic song with influences of acid house, New-age and Sufi music. Unlike other tracks in Bedtime Stories, which are "warm, adult-contemporary-laced [and] urban", "Bedtime Story" is "slower [with] less melody but a more complex rhythmic structure", as noted by AllMusic's Jose F. Promis, and author Victor Amaro Vicente. Rooksby held that the lyrics talk about the "joys of unconsciousness and rejection of the supposed constraints of reason and language", while to the staff of Rolling Stone, they deal with an "exploration of feelings so powerful they transcend language". According to the sheet music published by Alfred Publishing Inc., "Bedtime Story" is set in the time signature of common time, with a moderate tempo of 108 beats per minute. However, its actual tempo is 112 beats per minute. Written in the key of G minor, Madonna's vocal range spans from the notes of A_{3} to G♭_{5}. and follows a basic sequence of Gm_{9}–Dm–E–A–G as its chord progression. Instrumentation is synthesized, consisting of drum machine loops, organs, strings, gurgles, handclaps, as well as a digitally-altered "homophonic" choir.

According to producer Marius De Vries, "Bedtime Story"'s "architecture" is "distinctly Björkian". The beginning is linked to the ending of previous album track "Sanctuary". It stars with two throaty groans that introduce the first verse; in it, Madonna sings in a "low, husky" register, Today is the last day that I'm using words/They've gone out, lost their meaning. Author Stan Hawkins pointed out that during this particular part, a "muddy" bassline "propels" the groove forward as reverbed organ chords punctuate the "cyclical" groove with "anticipated, off-beat" stabs. Throughout the song, the word traveling is constantly repeated, which seems to indicate a "deep rhetoric of desire". This perceived desire is unleashed in "full force" through the phrase And inside, We're all still wet/Longing and yearning/How can I explain how I feel?. The song ends "abruptly", with Madonna singing in a "naked and vulnerable voice", And all that you've ever learned/try to forget/I'll never explain again.

Subtexts have been perceived in the song's lyrics and meaning. Amaro Vicente noted references to Islamic mysticism, sexuality, postmodernism and New age, especially in the song's theme of meditation and relaxation. Phrases such as honey, longing and yearning, and the sexual connotations of being wet on the inside, do not relate to "secular" love, but to "ecstatic" Sufi poetry. The author concluded that the lyrics to "Bedtime Story" allude to concepts of movement which are "central" to Sufi philosophy: Achieving fana through sema.

== Release and remixes ==
In Australia and most European countries, "Bedtime Story" was released as the parent album's third official single on February 13, 1995. It was issued in the United States in March. Official remixes were created by British duo Orbital, and American DJ Junior Vasquez. Jose F. Promis noted that the remixes "spin [the song] into a whole different direction"; the first remix is an edited take on the original album version; the "Junior's Single Edit" is taken from the "Junior's Wet Dream Mix", which Premis said sounds "much more accessible and radio-friendly than the [album] original".

Orbital's remixes were noted as being "dreamier" than the ones created by Vasquez, while the "Junior's Sound Factory Mix", "at times almost resembl[es] a march". In 2001, "Bedtime Story" was included on Madonna's second compilation album, GHV2. Twenty years later, "rare" remixes of the track, such as the "Lush vocal", dub, "Percapella" and "Unconscious in the Jungle" mixes, were made available for digital download and streaming. The "Junior's Single Mix" was then added to Finally Enough Love: 50 Number Ones (2022), Madonna's third remix album. The original "Let's Get Unconscious" demo was re-worked as "Sweet Intuition", and included as a B-side on Björk's "Army of Me" single, and remixed on the "It's Oh So Quiet" single.

== Critical reception ==
"[T]he title track from La M's latest opus [...] is easily among her boldest and most experimental pop singles to date, with its trippy and cutting-edge trance dance rhythms, masterfully crafted by the artist with producer Nellee Hooper. [...] [It] may jolt a few at first, but its ingratiating hook will surely win out in the end. [...] [A] brillantly conceived and brave single".

— Billboard's Larry Flick reviewing "Bedtime Story".

Upon release, "Bedtime Story" was met with generally positive critical feedback. AllMusic's Stephen Thomas Erlewine deemed it one of the best songs from the album, that "slowly work their melodies into the subconscious". Jose F. Promis said it was one of Madonna's "most adventurous singles [...] although not very commercial, it stays true to its source, which is pure, unadulterated dance music". From Billboard, Larry Flick said it was one of Bedtime Stories' "strongest and more club-friendly cuts". Writing for Idolator, Bianca Gracie referred to "Bedtime Story" as a "truly hypnotizing" highlight, and applauded its "trippy vibe that separates itself from the rest [of the album]". On his weekly UK chart commentary, critic James Masterton said that it was the "most credible" single Madonna had released up to that point since "Vogue" (1990). In The Music of Madonna, author Chris Wade wrote that, although penned by Björk, Madonna made the song her own by "adding a druggy, sleepiness [to it] that makes it one of her most unusual, quirky and challenging tracks".

Amaro Vicente applauded the track's "slow atmospheric qualities" and "intricate, steady and continuous" rhythmic structure. For Matthew Rettenmund, author of Encyclopedia Madonnica, "Bedtime Story" is one of the singer's "most delicious, if uncharacteristic, songs [...] a hypnotic, almost hallucinogenic ride through an idealized unconscious state of mind". In Madonna: Blond Ambition, Mark Bego deemed "Bedtime Story" the "centerpiece" of the parent album. The Guardian's Jude Rogers referred to it as "gorgeously hypnotic", but nonetheless criticized it for sounding "too much like Björk". Rikky Rooksby compared "Bedtime Story" to the work of British duo Everything but the Girl, but felt it should've been longer and "more trippy". Despite writing that its "electronic pulse ratchets [Bedtime Stories] up a gear", Daryl Easlea said "Bedtime Story" lacks the "beats with which Madonna's previous work had been so richly laden". A negative review came from The Boston Globe critic Steve Morse, who felt the song "comes undone" because of its "trite" lyrics. Also negative was Alex Needham, writing for NME, who said the song was a "bizarre curio" that, "didn’t suit [Madonna] at all". Pitchfork's Owen Pallett panned "Bedtime Story" as an "unimaginably disappointing—sterile and static, less-daring second cousin" to Björk's "Violently Happy", and said it was Madonna's "first truly embarrassing flop".

=== Recognition and impact ===
In 2001, Sal Cinquemani referred to "Bedtime Story" as, "[p]erhaps the single with the most unfulfilled hit potential" in Madonna's career". Four years later, Entertainment Weekly said it was one of her most underrated songs. "Bedtime Story" was named Madonna's 49th and 47th greatest song by The Backlot's Louis Virtel and the staff of Rolling Stone, respectively. Parade's Samuel R. Murrian described it as an "arresting experience unlike anything else in Madonna's canon", and named it her 43rd best single. The Junior's Wet Dream remix was considered Madonna's 44th best song by the staff of Billboard; "['Bedtime Story']'s core pulse held some allure, and longtime remixer Junior Vasquez drew it out with his far more maximal Wet Dream Remix, which found the implicit hedonism in the song's hook", wrote Andrew Unterberger. On The A.V. Club's ranking, "Bedtime Story" was allocated the 37th spot. From PinkNews, Nayer Missim named it Madonna's 13th greatest single: "This [song] absolutely wouldn't sound out of place on [Björk's] Debut or Post albums, and with [Madonna's] vocals it shouldn't work but just does. An unlikely classic".

Furthermore, "Bedtime Story" has been noted as the song that foretold Madonna's work with electronic dance music in the late 1990s and early 2000s, specifically Ray of Light (1998), her seventh studio album. Amaro Vicente wrote that, "[Ray of Light] owes its contemplative and electronic techno rave character" to "Bedtime Story", while according to De Vries, the song "seemed to set something free [in Madonna], [she] was straining at the leash a little bit, to find some other languages to speak, ['Bedtime Story'] was an embryonic moment that went a lot further on to [her] next few albums". Sal Cinquemani said it was the "germ" that would inspire Madonna to "seek out and conquer electronica with the likes of William Orbit and Mirwais". "Bedtime Story" was, according to Entertainment Weekly's Chuck Arnold, the "jumping-off point for the avant-garde electronica of Ray of Light", an opinion that was shared by Owen Pallett, and Albumism's Quentin Harrison. Bianca Gracia noted influence of "Bedtime Story" on Britney Spears' 2003 song "Breathe on Me".

== Chart performance ==
"Bedtime Story" debuted on the US Billboard Hot 100 at number 74 the week of April 22, 1995, with first-week sales of 12,000. The next week, the song peaked at number 42, becoming Madonna's first US single since her debut "Everybody" (1982) to not reach the top 40. Billboard's Fred Bronson attributed the song's weak chart performance to its low sales and lack of radio airplay. "Bedtime Story" spent a total of seven weeks on the Billboard Hot 100. The song, however, found success on the Dance Club Play chart, where it reached the first spot. It was Madonna's seventeenth Hot Dance chart-topper. By the end of 1995, it ranked 17th on the Dance Club Play chart. In Canada, the single peaked at the 42nd position of RPM's Top Singles chart on the week of May 15, 1995.

In the United Kingdom, "Bedtime Story" debuted and peaked at the fourth position of the UK Singles Chart on February 25, 1995. Two weeks later, it left the top 20, spending a total of nine weeks on the chart. According to Music Week magazine, over 97,000 copies of the single have been sold in the United Kingdom as of 2008. "Bedtime Story" also reached the fourth position in Scotland. The song had a lukewarm reception throughout Europe, barely reaching the top 50 and top 40 in The Netherlands and Belgium, respectively. It was more successful in Italy, where it reached the top-ten. "Bedtime Story" peaked at the sixteenth spot of the European Hot 100 Singles chart. In Australia, the song debuted and peaked at number five on April 9, remaining in that position for three weeks. It fell out of the top-ten in its fifth week, and eventually exited the charts after a total run of nine weeks. In New Zealand, "Bedtime Story" debuted at number 40 on May 7, eventually reaching 38, and leaving the chart the following week.

== Music video ==
=== Background and filming ===
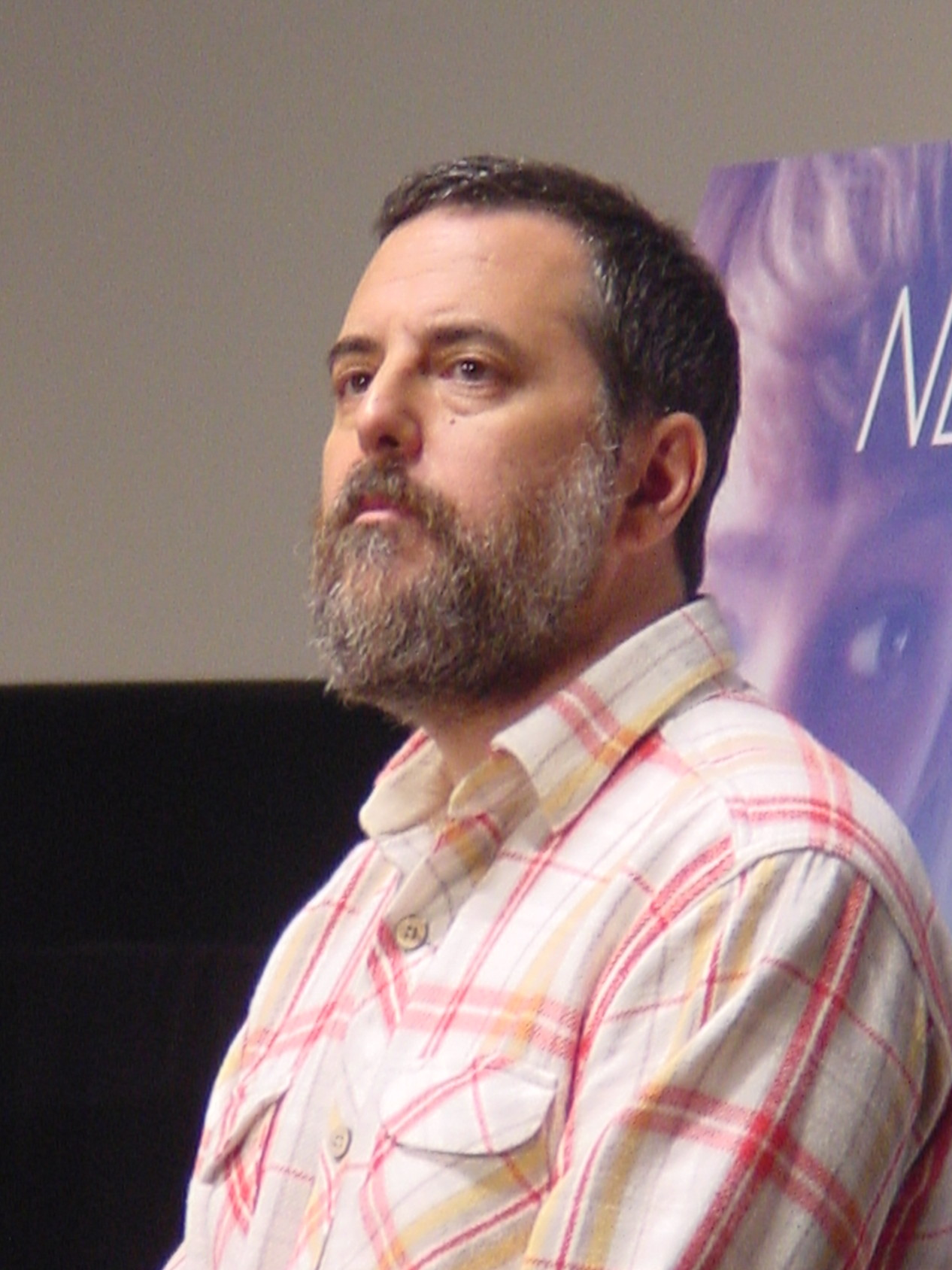
Mark Romanek (picture) directed the music video for "Bedtime Story".

The music video for "Bedtime Story" was directed by American filmmaker Mark Romanek —with whom Madonna had previously worked on "Rain" (1993)— and produced by Propaganda Films' Larry Perel. Shot in 35 mm film, crew included Tom Foden in production design, and Harris Savides in cinematography. Due to its "elaborate visual effects", "Bedtime Story" cost a reported US$5 million (US$10.56 million in 2025), making it one of the most expensive music videos of all time.

In late 1992, Madonna approached Romanek to direct the video for the single "Bad Girl". At the time, she was staying at the Sherry-Netherland in New York. Romanek recalled that she did not have anything personal with her at the time, except a small copy of Frida Kahlo's My Birth. The director found the painting "dark and disturbed", and suggested he and Madonna recreate it on a music video, an idea she liked. Romanek turned down the offer to direct "Bad Girl", but "file[d] away" the idea of emulating the painting on a video. When Madonna contacted him for "Bedtime Story", Romanek quickly agreed, having perceived in the song the "same dark, surreal qualities" from My Birth.

For the visual, Romanek wanted a "very feminine attitude towards these artistic images", and thus began delving into the lives of female surrealist painters like Frida Kahlo, Leonora Carrington and Remedios Varo. He also drew inspiration from male painter René Magritte, British artist Lucian Freud, Russian filmmaker Andrei Tarkovsky, and Sergei Parajanov's The Color of Pomegranates (1969). Romanek got in touch with storyboard artist Grant Shaffer —who'd previously worked with Madonna on "Rain" and "Deeper and Deeper" (1992)— to create the storyboards for the video. They met at a café in Venice Beach, where the director had Shaffer listen to the song, and showed him a batch of surrealism-inspired pictures of a "mystical-looking" Madonna with long white hair —a look Romanek wanted to capture on video. For the next few days, Madonna would call in from Florida and, alongside Romanek, would describe to Shaffer every aspect of the video, including budget and their concepts. Shaffer by his part, would work on the storyboards and fax them for approval; the final storyboards were completed about 20 days later. According to the artist, when he attended the filming, he discovered that many of the ideas from his storyboards had "evolved, but retained the core concepts".

Filming took place from December 5–11, 1994, at the Universal Studios in Universal City, California. Pre-production used a stand-in for Madonna. Shooting faced minor complications: It had to be stopped temporarily following a minor earthquake; Madonna got dyed in blue from sitting too long in a colored-water tank; a scene showing her opening her chest cavity had to be scrapped due to technical issues. One shot —involving Madonna lying in the lap of a skeleton— had to be postponed since the skeleton was too small for her, and had to be rebuilt from scratch. The last scene filmed had the singer donning a "futuristic" dress, sleeping in a laboratory. In order to "perfect the myriad digital effects that lend the video its cinematic quality", post-production took several weeks, led by Romanek's long time visual effects collaborator Ash Beck.

=== Synopsis and release ===
Screenshot of the "Bedtime Story" music video, showing Madonna giving birth to a flock of doves. Authors Santiago Fouz-Hernández and Freya Jarman-Ivens compared this particular scene with Mexican surrealist artist Frida Kahlo's 1932 painting My Birth.

Billboard's Deborah Russell described the video as "bizarre, dreamy surrealis[t] [that] illustrates the song's catch phrase, Let's get unconscious". It begins with a blue screen showing the Eye of Horus, and beneath it, the words "Welcome – subject: Ciccone, M". The singer appears lying on a bed, seemingly the subject of an experiment. She dons a "particularly unattractive" combination of pale-blue eyeshadow and frosted lipstick, while a blue liquid dripping from a funnel is seemingly injected into her arm. An intense light shines through her pale body, which seems to vanish into its surroundings. The video progresses into a "dreamlike" sequence, containing surrealistic, mystic, new age, Sufi and Egyptian imagery and symbolism. Such include a scene in which Madonna sings in front of the undulating petals of a rotating sunflower, a woman with long flowing hair, an alchemist holding a cube showing the black-and-white face of a brunette Madonna on each side, as well as whirling dervishes.

Other shots include a little girl reading a book in front of a vase of poppies; a man looking down into a pool which has Madonna amidst the half-sunken skulls of strange beaked creatures; Madonna —dressed in a flowing nightgown with a nose piercing— giving birth to a flock of doves, and then laying on the lap of a skeleton who comes to life and hugs her. One scene shows two people sitting on a bench and holding hands. The person on the right is clothed in a man's suit, while the one on the left wears a dress; they have mirrors instead of heads. Towards the end, Madonna, dressed in a white gown with flowing hair, floats down a corridor and then appears in a black-and-white projection in a cinema-like room. Interspersed footage of skulls and scars, the singer wading through space, and her scared expression play next. A scene in which Madonna has mouths for eyes, and an eye for a mouth, precedes the ending. The video ends with her suddenly waking up in the laboratory from the beginning.

On March 10, 1995, the video was given a cinematic release at three different Odeon Cineplex film theaters: Broadway Cinemas in Santa Monica, California; the Chelsea Theater in Manhattan, and the Biograph Theater in Chicago. Abbey Konowitch, spokesperson for Madonna's label Maverick, noted that, "it was clear Romanek's vision and execution deserved a treatment that transcended the television screen [...] a different treatment from the norm". By aligning with Odeon, viewers were able "to see [the video] before anyone else, in a form in which no one else will see it". By his part, Odeon VP Freeman Fisher added that, since it was a slow theatrical season, partnering with a high-profile artist like Madonna enabled them to sell more tickets; "[It's] a great way to inject some fun into going to the movies [...] for four minutes the audience sees astounding cinematic images in a first class feature-like production. It's not just another artist lip-syncing to a track." Madonna's Pajama Party was an event done to promote the video's release, that took place at New York Webster Hall on March 18, and was broadcast on MTV. The singer read David Kirk's Miss Spider's Tea Party to a crowd of 2,000, while Junior Vasquez played remixes of the song. "Bedtime Story" can be found on Madonna's compilations The Video Collection 93:99 (1999) and Celebration: The Video Collection (2009).

=== Reception and analysis ===
"One of the key factors in Madonna's unrivaled longevity is her willingness to experiment, over and over and over. [The video for 'Bedtime Story'] is a testament to that. A jaw-dropping cinematic achievement, it's like walking around inside a Salvador Dali painting".

— Parade's Samuel R. Murrian reviewing "Bedtime Story" on the magazine's ranking of Madonna videos, where it came in at number five.

The "Bedtime Story" music video has been critically appreciated since its release. O'Brien said it was one of Madonna's most experimental, and a "Dalí-esque" epic that allowed her to enter "the portals of high art". Mary Gabriel, in her book Madonna: A Rebel Life, deemed it a "moving painting". For Idolator's Mike Nied, it is an "appropriately surreal and stunning video", as well as the singer's 13th best. It also came in at number 13 on Slant Magazine's ranking. Louis Virtel named it Madonna's eighth greatest video, calling it the "Mulholland Drive of [her] video oeuvre, a living, convulsing fever dream. [...] [T]he Björk-iest video she's ever done". "Bedtime Story" came in the fifth position of a poll conducted by Billboard of the singer's 10 greatest videos. Julien Sauvalle from Out magazine considered it to be one of Madonna's "most stylish" music videos. "Bedtime Story" is one of the singer's most underrated music videos according to VH1's Christopher Rosa, who described it as her "weirdest to date [...] psychedelic —and at times downright disturbing [...] this avant-garde clip is serious foreshadowing for Lady Gaga's strange brand of pop art".

Jake Hall from Dazed magazine declared "Bedtime Story" the blueprint for the "90s brand of futurism", adding that the video "eschews the obvious and instead relies on undulating CGI". Writing for ComingSoon.net, Brad Brevet saw influence of the video on Tarsem Singh's films, The Cell (2000) and The Fall (2006). Both "Bedtime Story" and The Cell share Christian symbolism and imagery based on Metatron's cube, and represent a "journey through the unconscious mind". In the case of The Fall, there's a shot of Sufi whirling that is "almost exactly the same [as 'Bedtime Story'], just reversed in color scheme". Influence of "Bedtime Story" was also noted on the music video for "Hold It Against Me" (2011) by Britney Spears; "[F]rom the futuristic set and the special effects to Brit's long, flowing gown and whirling dancers, ['Bedtime Story'] appears to be a direct influence on pretty much everything in 'HIAM'. Though we're willing to bet Brit didn't spend nearly as much to make her version", wrote James Montgomery.

James Steffen, author of The Cinema of Sergei Parajanov, pointed out that some of the imagery in the video —a scene showing a bare foot crushing grapes over a slab inscribed with Arabic, and the shot of a bishop's croziers falling into hand― was "directly lifted" from The Color of Pomegranates. In the book Madonna's Drowned Worlds, Santiago Fouz-Hernández and Freya Jarman-Ivens wrote that the video took the concepts of new age and adapted them "through the recurrence of androgyny. The New Age dreams of a perfect world, and these dreams are being present by Madonna as a 'bedtime story', an occasion for dreaming". The authors added that the video hints at the creation of a "new world, filled with magic and symbols [...] All this is linked to the beliefs of the New Age, which itself refers to the arcane world of hermeticism". "Bedtime Story" was further compared to "Open Your Heart" (1986) —which features Art Deco influences and imagery; both videos are a key to the singer's "world of images", as noted by the authors. Stewart Mason from Slant Magazine added that, "[the video] offers innumerable images to pluck and peel back, revealing not only reference points, but also an embrace of the spiritual transcendence of the nonverbal depicted in the lyrics [...] a monument to the unexplainable sway of human connection". “Bedtime Story” is one of few music videos in history to be permanently displayed at New York's Museum of Modern Art.

== Live performances ==
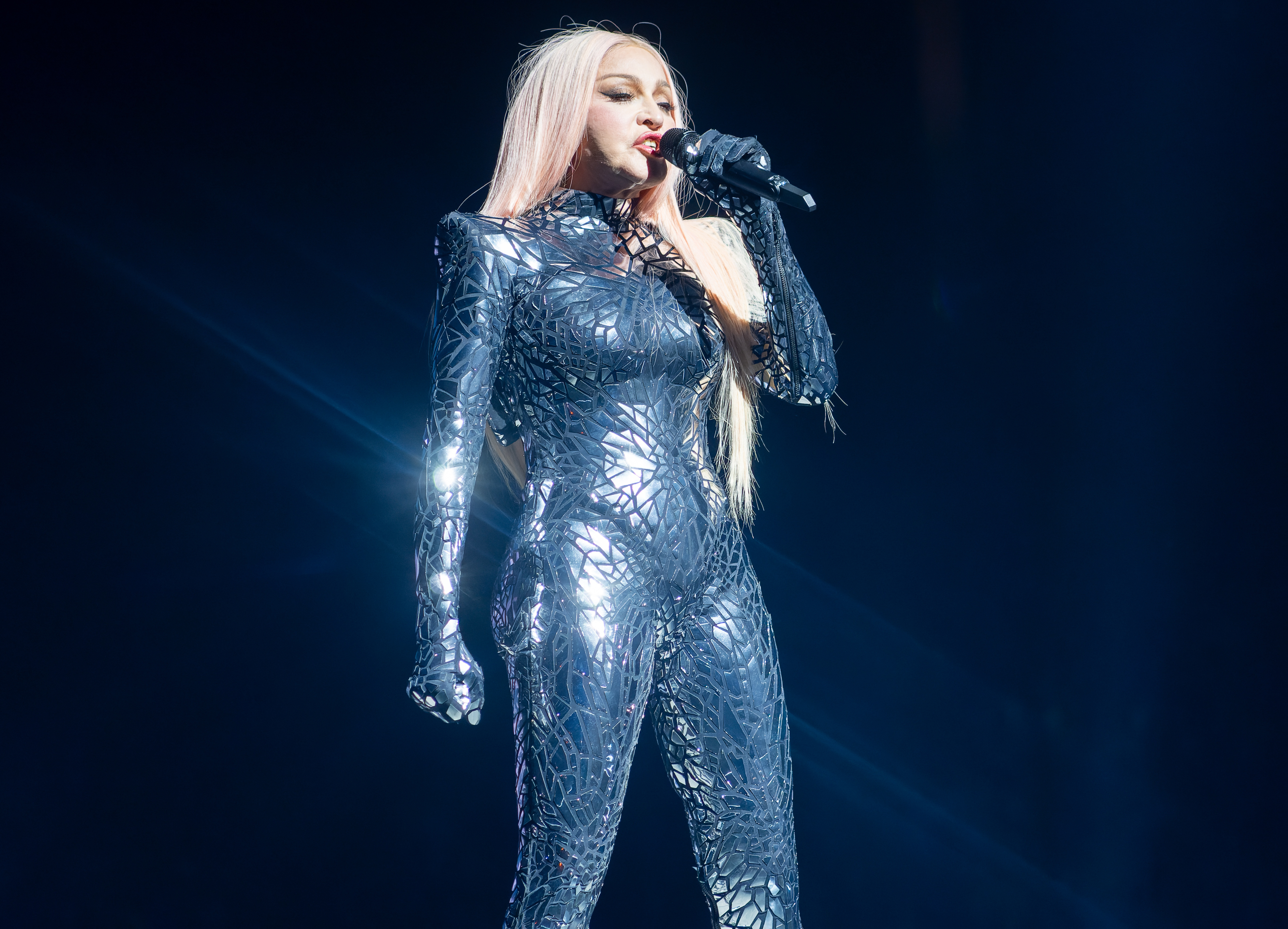
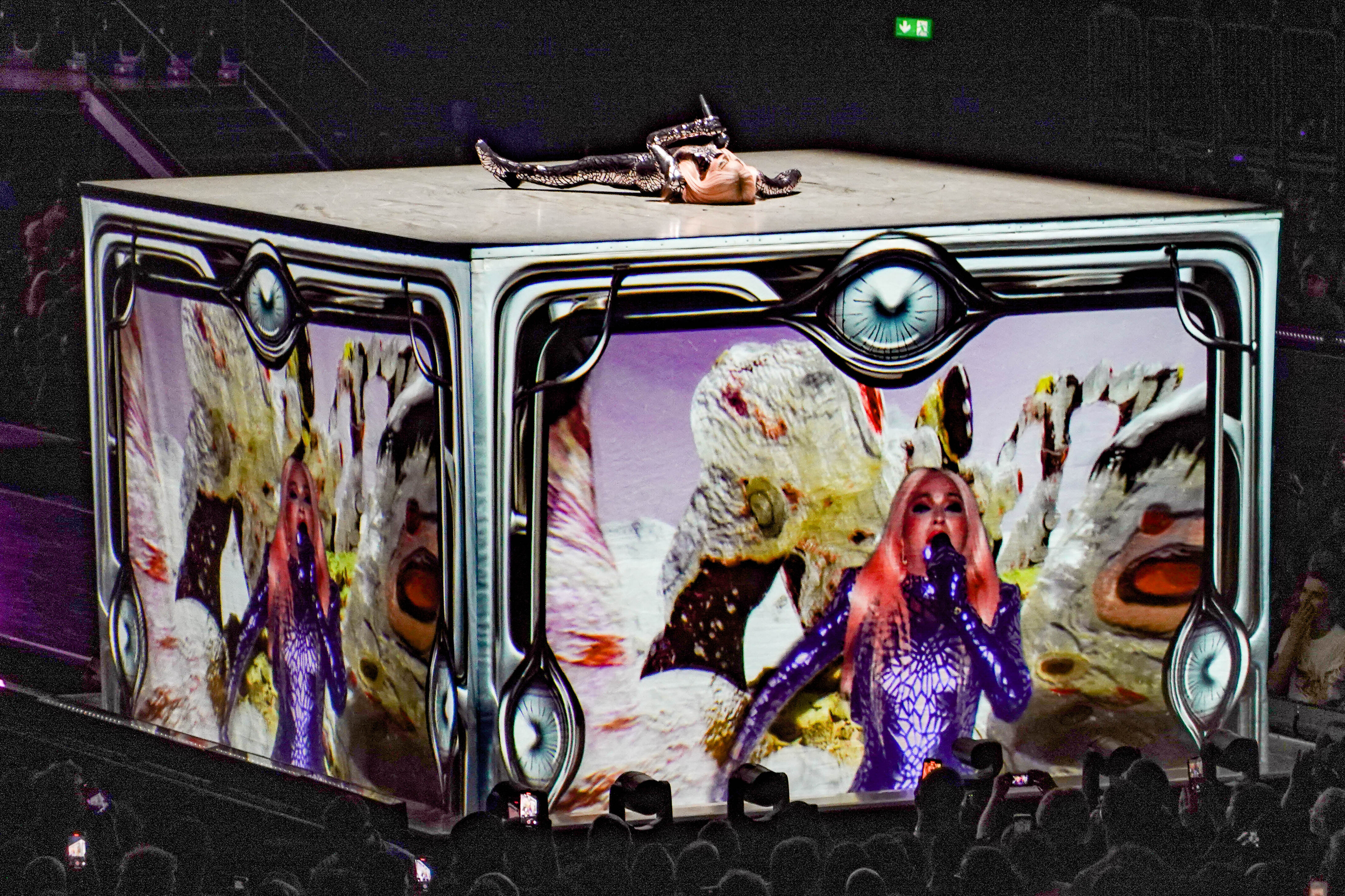
Madonna singing "Bedtime Story" on the Celebration Tour (2023—2024). The performance had her wearing a mirrored catsuit, and singing on top of a giant cube (right).

Madonna sang one of the Junior Vasquez remixes of "Bedtime Story" at the 15th edition of the Brit Awards, on February 20, 1995. She was joined by three satin-clad male dancers, and sang between two wind machines that turned "her waist-length blond extensions into flames, and her diaphanous Versace gown into a parachute", as noted by Mary Gabriel. The staff of Marie Claire named the performance one of the 30 best moments in the awards show history. The song's Orbital mix was used as a video interlude on 2004's Re-Invention World Tour. The backdrop screen showed a video of Madonna singing from a scanner, while trapeze artists onstage hung from swings. For Newsday's Glenn Gamboa, "the athletic swinging of her dancers [during 'Bedtime Story'] provided the song a grace that it never would have seen in a straight performance".

On the Celebration Tour (2023—2024), Madonna performed "Bedtime Story" on top of a cube that rose from the front stage, donning a silver mirrored catsuit with oversized shoulders confectioned by Versace, and a long flowing pink wig. Projectors covered each side of the cube, and depicted a video created by Brazilian video game developer Gabriel Massan. Inspired by the song's video, Massan's visual depicted "dreamy" landscapes, while Madonna's movements were recorded in real time and linked to an avatar that emulated them. Billboard's Joe Lynch named "Bedtime Story" one of the concert's best moments. By contrast, Mark Savage from the BBC said it "felt superfluous".

== Track listings and formats ==
- US 7-inch, CD, and cassette single
1. "Bedtime Story" – 4:53
2. "Survival" – 3:33
- US CD maxi-single
1. "Bedtime Story" (Album edit) – 4:08
2. "Bedtime Story" (Junior's Wet Dream Mix) – 8:35
3. "Bedtime Story" (Junior's Dreamy Drum Dub) – 9:34
4. "Survival" – 3:33
5. "Bedtime Story" (Orbital Mix) – 7:44
6. "Bedtime Story" (Junior's Sound Factory Mix) – 9:18
7. "Bedtime Story" (Junior's Single Mix) – 4:53
- US 12-inch vinyl
1. "Bedtime Story" (Junior's Sound Factory Mix) – 9:18
2. "Bedtime Story" (Junior's Sound Factory Dub) – 8:19
3. "Bedtime Story" (Orbital Mix) – 7:44
4. "Bedtime Story" (Junior's Wet Dream Mix) – 8:35
5. "Bedtime Story" (Junior's Wet Dream Dub) – 7:30
- UK and European 12-inch vinyl
1. "Bedtime Story" (Junior's Sound Factory Mix) – 9:18
2. "Bedtime Story" (Junior's Sound Factory Dub) – 8:19
3. "Bedtime Story" (Junior's Wet Dream Mix) – 8:35
4. "Bedtime Story" (Orbital Mix) – 7:44
- UK 7-inch and Cassette Single
1. "Bedtime Story" (Album Edit) – 4:08
2. "Bedtime Story" (Junior's Single Mix) – 4:53
- UK limited edition storybook CD single
1. "Bedtime Story" (Junior's Single Mix) – 4:53
2. "Secret" (Allstar Mix) – 5:10
3. "Secret" (Some Bizarre Mix) – 9:48
4. "Secret" (Some Bizarre Single Mix) – 4:17
- UK, European and Australian CD maxi-single
1. "Bedtime Story" (Album Edit) – 4:08
2. "Bedtime Story" (Junior's Wet Dream Mix) – 8:35
3. "Bedtime Story" (Junior's Dreamy Drum Dub) – 9:34
4. "Bedtime Story" (Orbital Mix) – 7:44
5. "Bedtime Story" (Junior's Sound Factory Mix) – 9:18
- Digital single (2021)
1. "Bedtime Story" (Album Edit) – 4:08
2. "Bedtime Story" (Junior's Wet Dream Mix) – 8:35
3. "Bedtime Story" (Junior's Dreamy Drum Dub) – 9:34
4. "Survival" – 3:33
5. "Bedtime Story" (Orbital Mix) – 7:44
6. "Bedtime Story" (Junior's Sound Factory Mix) – 9:18
7. "Bedtime Story" (Junior's Single Mix) – 4:53
8. "Bedtime Story" (Junior's Sound Factory Mix Edit) – 4:19
9. "Bedtime Story" (Junior's Sound Factory Dub) – 8:19
10. "Bedtime Story" (Junior's Wet Dream Dub) – 7:31
11. "Bedtime Story" (Lush Vocal Radio Edit) – 4:42
12. "Bedtime Story" (Lush Vocal Mix) – 6:47
13. "Bedtime Story" (Luscious Dub Mix) – 7:38
14. "Bedtime Story" (Percapella Mix) – 6:31
15. "Bedtime Story" (Unconscious in the Jungle Mix) – 6:26

== Credits and personnel ==
Credits and personnel are adapted from the Bedtime Stories album liner notes.

- Madonna – lead vocals, producer
- Björk – songwriter
- Nellee Hooper – songwriter, producer
- Marius De Vries – producer
- Frederick Jorio – mixing
- P. Dennis Mitchell – mixing
- Robert Kiss – assistant engineer
- Joey Moskowitz – programming
- Paolo Riversi – cover art, photographer, designer
- Michael Penn – designer

== Charts ==
=== Weekly charts ===
Weekly chart performance for "Bedtime Story"
Chart (1995)	Peak position
Australia (ARIA)	5
Belgium (Ultratop 50 Flanders)	38
Canada Contemporary Hit Radio (The Record)	24
Canada Retail Singles (The Record)	17
Canada Top Singles (RPM)	42
Europe (Eurochart Hot 100)	16
Europe (European Hit Radio)	33
Finland (Suomen virallinen lista)	4
Ireland (IRMA)	19
Italy (Musica e dischi)	8
Netherlands (Single Top 100)	46
New Zealand (Recorded Music NZ)	38
Scottish Singles Sales (Official Charts)	4
UK Singles (Official Charts)	4
UK Dance (Official Charts)	6
UK Pop Tip Club Chart (Music Week)	17
US Billboard Hot 100	42
US Dance Club Songs (Billboard)	1
US Dance Singles Sales (Billboard)	3
US Pop Airplay (Billboard)	38
US Rhythmic Airplay (Billboard)	40
US Cash Box Top 100	30

=== Year-end charts ===
Year-end chart performance for "Bedtime Story"
Chart (1995)	Position
Australia (ARIA)	91
US Dance Club Play (Billboard)	3

== See also ==
- List of number-one dance singles of 1995 (U.S.)
- List of most expensive music videos

== Bibliography ==
- Amaro Vicente, Victor (2007). The Aesthetics of Motion in Musics for the Mevlana Celal Ed-Din Rumi. University Press of Maryland. ISBN 978-0-549-32271-9.
- Bego, Mark (2000). Madonna: Blonde Ambition. Cooper Square Press. ISBN 978-0-8154-1051-5.
- Clerk, Carol (2012). Madonnastyle. Omnibus Press. ISBN 978-0-7119-8874-3.
- Easlea, Daryl (2012). Madonna: Blond Ambition. Backbeat Books. ISBN 9781617130342.
- Falconi, Francesco (2017). Mad for Madonna: La Regina del Pop. Babelcube Inc. ISBN 978-1-5071-7795-2.
- Friskics-Warren, Bill (2006). I'll Take You There: Pop Music and the Urge for Transcendence. A & C Black. ISBN 0826419216.
- Fouz-Hernández, Santiago; Jarman-Ivens, Freeya (2004). Madonna's Drowned Worlds. Ashgate Publishing, Ltd. ISBN 0-7546-3372-1.
- Gabriel, Mary (2023). Madonna: A Rebel Life. Hachette UK. ISBN 978-0316456449.
- Hawkins, Stan (2017). Settling the Pop Score: Pop Texts and Identity Politics. Taylor & Francis. ISBN 9781351549103.
- Morgan, Michelle (2015). Madonna. Hachette UK. ISBN 978-1472119438.
- O'Brien, Lucy (2008). Madonna: Like an Icon. Bantam Press. ISBN 978-0-593-05547-2.
- Pytlik, Mark (2003). Björk: Wow and Flutter. ECW Press. ISBN 978-0-8195-6514-3.
- Rettenmund, Matthew (1995). Encyclopedia Madonnica. St. Martin's Press. ISBN 0-312-11782-5.
- Rooksby, Rikky (2004). The Complete Guide to the Music of Madonna. Omnibus Press. ISBN 0-7119-9883-3.
- Ryan, Gavin (2011). Australia's Music Charts 1988–2010. Mt. Martha, VIC, Australia: Moonlight Publishing.
- Steffen, James (2013). The Cinema of Sergei Parajanov. University of Wisconsin Press. ISBN 9780299296537.
- Taraborrelli, Randy J. (2002). Madonna: An Intimate Biography. Simon & Schuster. ISBN 9780330454469.
- Timmerman, Dirk (2007). Madonna Live! Secret Re-inventions and Confessions on Tour. Maklu. ISBN 978-9-085-95002-8.
- Wade, Chris (2016). The Music of Madonna. Wisdom Twins Books. ISBN 978-1-326-53580-3.
