= Valeri Petrov =

Bulgarian writer, poet and translator (1920–2014)

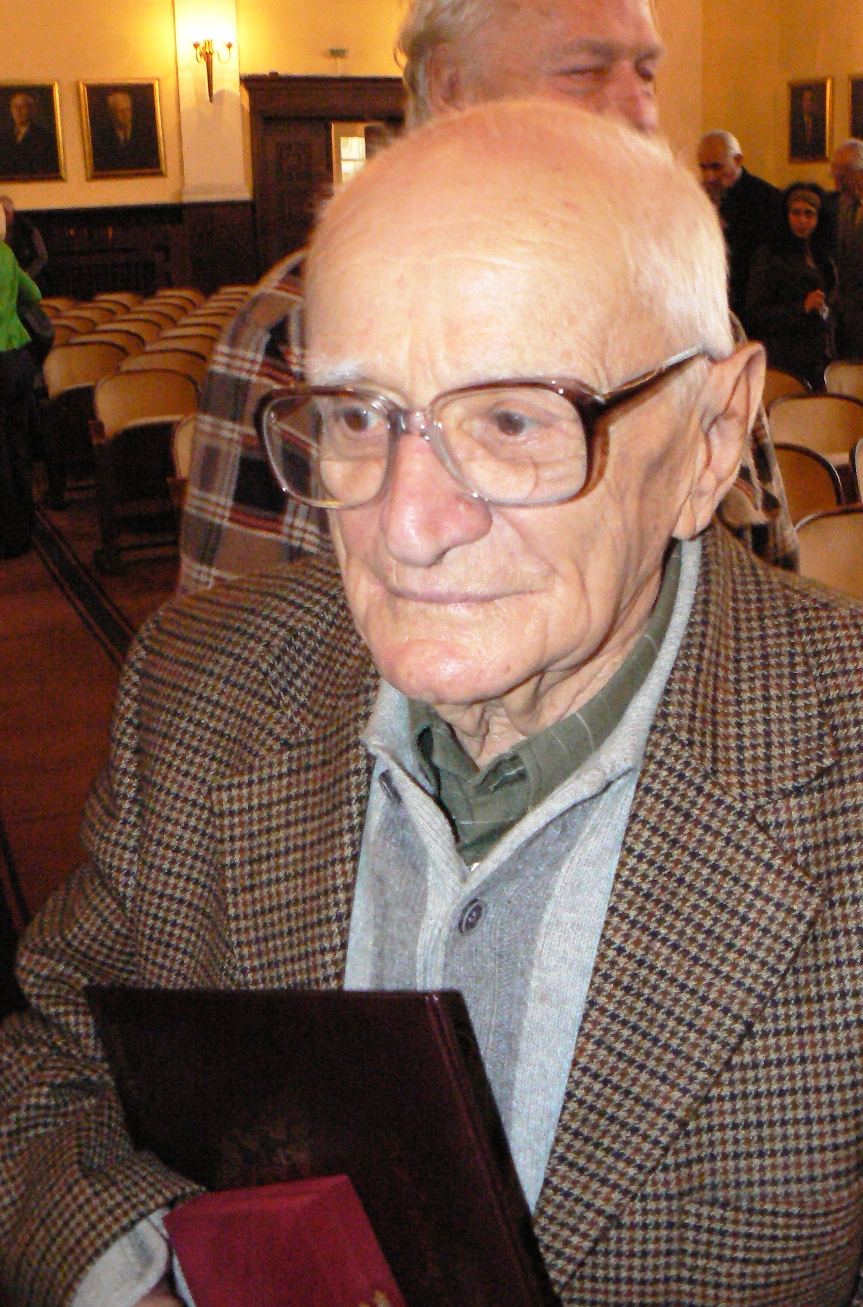
Valeri Petrov after the awarding of the memorial sign "Marin Drinov" from the Bulgarian Academy of Sciences, 20 May 2011

Valeri Petrov (Bulgarian: Валери Петров, pseudonym of Valeri Nisim Mevorah (Валери Нисим Меворах); 22 April 1920 – 27 August 2014), was a popular Bulgarian poet, screenwriter, playwright and translator of paternal Jewish origin.

== Early life ==
Born in the capital Sofia to lawyer Nisim Mevorah (and Bulgarian ambassador to the USA in 1945–47 and representative to the UN) and high-school French teacher Mariya Petrova, Valeri Petrov studied at the Italian School in the city, finishing in 1939. He graduated in medicine from Sofia University in 1944.

== Languages ==
Valeri Petrov was fluent in Bulgarian, English, Russian, German, Italian and Spanish. His English language was at such a high level that he translated the complete works of Shakespeare. He probably knew also French (since his mother was a French language teacher) and Hebrew.

== Poet and playwright ==
When he was 15, Petrov published his first independent book: the poem Ptitsi kam sever ("Birds Northwards"). In this and subsequent publications he used his non-Jewish mother's surname or other pseudonyms because of the pro-Nazi regime in Bulgaria at the time. He later wrote the poems Palechko ("Tom Thumb"), Na pat ("En route"), Juvenes dum sumus, Kray sinyoto more ("By the Blue Sea"), Tavanski spomen (A Reminiscence from an Attic) and the series Nezhnosti ("Endearments").

In 1978, Petrov wrote the children's musical Button for Sleep. He is particularly esteemed for the quality of his translation of the entire works of Shakespeare – the authoritative rendition of the Bard in Bulgarian.

== Journalist ==
In the autumn and winter of 1944, when Bulgaria switched sides and joined the Allies in the Second World War, Valeri Petrov worked first at Radio Sofia and then as a wartime writer with the newspaper Frontovak ("Front Fighter"). Following the war, he was among the founders of the humoristic newspaper Starshel ("The Hornet") and its assistant editor-in-chief (1945–1962). He served as a doctor in a military hospital and in the Rila Monastery.

Between 1947 and 1950, Petrov worked in the Bulgarian legation in Rome as a press and cultural attache. During the time he travelled to the United States, Switzerland and France, delegating to various forums.

He was also an editor in a film studio and in the Balgarski pisatel publishing house. He served as a deputy in the Grand National Assembly. Since 2003, he was an academician of the Bulgarian Academy of Sciences. Politically, he was a leftist and a socialist since his schooling in the Third Bulgarian Kingdom, through the Communist period, and until his death.

== Death ==
On 27 August 2014, Petrov died from a stroke in a Sofia hospital. He was 94.

== Works ==
- 1944 — Naroden Sad ("People's Court"), communist odes dedicated to killing people opposing the communist regime
- 1945 — Stari neshta malko po novomu ("Old stuff in a somewhat new way", poetical series
- 1949 — Stihotvoreniya ("Poems"), a book of poetry
- 1956 — screenplay for the film Tochka parva ("Item One")
- 1958 — Kniga za Kitay ("A Book about China"), travel notes
- 1958 — screenplay for the film Na malkiya ostrov ("On the Small Island")
- 1960 — V mekata esen ("In the Mild Autumn"), a poem; awarded the Dimitrov Award
- 1962 — Improvizatsiya ("Improvisation"), a stage play co-written with Radoy Ralin
- 1962 — Poemi, a collection of poems
- 1962 — screenplay for the film Slantseto i syankata ("The Sun and the Shadow")
- 1965 — Kogato rozite tantsuvat ("When Roses Dance"), a stage play
- 1965 — Afrikanski belezhnik ("An African Notebook"), travel notes
- 1966 — screenplay for the film Ritsar bez bronya ("A Knight without an Armour")
- 1970 — Na smyah ("In Jest"), satirical poems
- 1970–1971 — translations of Shakespeare's Comedies, two volumes
- 1973–1974 — translations of Shakespeare's Tragedies, two volumes
- 1977 — Byala prikazka ("A White Fairy Tale")
- 1978 — Kopche za san ("A Dream Button")
- 1981 — screenplay for the film Yo Ho Ho - later adapted into the 2006 film The Fall
- 1986 — Pet prikazki ("Five Fairy Tales")
- 1990 — Selected Works, two volumes

== Honours ==
Petrov Ridge in Graham Land, Antarctica is named after Valeri Petrov.
