= Bedtime Stories: The Untold Chapter =

2025 extended play by Madonna

EP by Madonna
- Released: November 28, 2025
- Recorded: 1993–1994
- Length: 27:04
- Labels: Maverick; Sire; Warner; Rhino
- Producers: Madonna; Dallas Austin; Dave Hall; Nellee Hooper; Shep Pettibone; Allstar; Howie Tee

Madonna chronology
Veronica Electronica (2025)	Bedtime Stories: The Untold Chapter (2025)	Confessions II (2026)

Bedtime Stories: The Untold Chapter is an EP by American singer-songwriter Madonna, released on November 28, 2025, through Warner Records. The release commemorates the 30th anniversary of her sixth studio album, Bedtime Stories (1994). The EP "trace[s] the evolution of Bedtime Stories' lush, R&B-influenced sound".

== Background ==
During the early 1990s, sex and sexuality became a common theme in Madonna's work. By 1994, there was a considerable critical and public backlash due to the sexual explicitness of her various projects. That same year she began working on her sixth studio album with frequent collaborator, Shep Pettibone. Pettibone was responsible for her number-one Billboard Hot 100 hits, "Vogue" in 1990, and "This Used to Be My Playground" in 1992. Madonna felt that the songs they were producing were too reminiscent of their previous effort Erotica (1992) and decided to go in a different direction. She reached out to R&B and hip-hop producers Babyface, Dallas Austin, and Dave Hall. She also began dabbling in the world of electronica with producer Nellee Hooper. A considerable number of demos were produced, one of which, "I'd Rather Be Your Lover", originally featured her then boyfriend, rapper Tupac Shakur. The resulting album, Bedtime Stories (1994), became a critical and commercial success. Due to her being cast in the 1996 film adaptation of the musical Evita, Madonna was unable to promote the album with a tour. She would later include the previously unreleased song, "Your Honesty", which she penned and co-produced with Dallas Austin during the Bedtime Stories sessions, on the EP Remixed & Revisited (2003).

In 2020, in the midst of the COVID-19 pandemic, Bedtime Stories hit the top of the iTunes album charts. Critics noted its cultural resurgence. Madonna thanked fans for purchasing it on social media and included the hashtag "#stayhome musical companion". In 2021, it was announced that Madonna had signed a career-spanning partnership deal with Warner Records. The deal included her entire back catalog: 17 studio albums, plus singles, soundtrack recordings, live albums, and compilations. Madonna, it was revealed, would be personally curating expansive deluxe editions of many of her landmark studio albums, as well as introduce unique releases for special events starting in 2022. In October 2024, Madonna teased a Bedtime Stories-related project on her official Facebook page. A photo with the words "Something's comin' over", along with the caption: "Happy 30th Anniversary, Bedtime Stories! Yes, 'we've got a secret'.... Check back soon to find out and in the meantime, play the album out loud", with a link to stream the album, were posted.

On February 17, 2025, Madonna teased the re-release of Bedtime Stories, through her Instagram account, to commemorate the 30th anniversary of its release. On October 9, 2025, she announced a November 28, 2025 release date for the Bedtime Stories: The Untold Chapter EP, along with reissues of the original studio album. The collection includes early demos, alternate versions, and rarities that trace the evolution of studio album's sound. A collectible silver LP of the original studio album (part of The Silver Collection), a two-disc CD (studio album and EP), as well as a 12" black vinyl EP of Bedtime Stories: The Untold Chapter, with exclusive postcards and poster, will also be released. Frequent collaborator Stuart Price was responsible for the editing and mixing of the original content. "Right on Time", a track written during the original studio sessions with producer Dallas Austin, was released as a single on digital platforms.

The EP includes the song "Love Won't Wait", which was abandoned and not used on the Bedtime Stories album. Madonna and producer Shep Pettibone later gave it to former Take That singer Gary Barlow. The songs "Let Down Your Guard", co-written with Dallas Austin, originally a B-side song to single "Secret", as well as "Freedom", which was released in 1997 on a charity album titled, Carnival! The Rainforest Foundation, will also be included on the set.

== Packaging ==
The artwork features previously unseen images from a 1994 photoshoot by Italian fashion and portrait photographer Paolo Roversi. Roversi's photos were used for the 1995 "Bedtime Story" single. Madonna had originally wanted to use photos for the 1994 studio album's packaging but her record label vetoed the idea. "They were going to be pictures for my album cover...but the people at the record company were all too freaked out; they thought the pictures were too blurry, they weren’t going to read well – whatever,” Madonna told Aperture in 1999. A photoshoot with photographer Patrick Demarchelier was conducted and used for the album packaging instead.

== Promotion ==
On October 9, 2025, Madonna released "Right on Time" as the lead promotional single for the campaign. It charted at 62 on the UK Singles Downloads Chart and 66 on the UK Singles Sales Chart. The Howie Tee remix of "Human Nature" shortly followed on October 24, 2025. "Love Won't Wait" was released on November 21, 2025, hitting the top of the iTunes charts in many countries. It charted at 44 on the UK Singles Downloads Chart and 47 on the UK Singles Sales Chart.

== Commercial performance ==
In the United Kingdom, Bedtime Stories: The Untold Chapter debuted and peaked at number 95 on the UK Albums Chart Top 100 on December 5, 2025, becoming Madonna's 31st release to enter that chart; additionally, the EP debuted at number 12 on the UK Albums Sales Chart; and debuted in the Top 10 at number 2 on the UK Albums Downloads Chart; and at number 9 on the UK Vinyl Albums Chart.

== Critical reception ==
Professional ratings
Review scores
Source	Rating
Slant Magazine	3/5 stars
Classic Pop	3.2/5 stars

Sal Cinquemani from Slant Magazine described EP as "faithful to the spirit of the original album's sound and surprisingly cohesive, limited to its R&B-leaning remixes and outtakes". However, he criticized the omission of some songs recorded for Bedtime Stories, concluding that "the story of one of her most underrated, nakedly revealing albums still has some loose ends".

== Track listing ==
Bedtime Stories: The Untold Chapter track listing
No.	Title	Writer(s)	Producer(s)	Length
1.	"Survival" (Quiet Storm Demo Remix)	Madonna; Dallas Austin	Nellee Hooper; Madonna	3:03
2.	"Secret" (Allstar New Single Mix)	Madonna; Austin	Madonna; Austin; Allstar^{[a]}	3:09
3.	"Right on Time" (Original Demo Edit)	Madonna; Austin	Madonna; Austin	2:37
4.	"Don't Stop" (Original Demo Edit)	Madonna; Austin; Colin Wolfe	Madonna; Austin	3:19
5.	"Freedom" (Short Mix)	Madonna; Austin	Madonna; Austin	3:08
6.	"Human Nature" (Howie Tee New Clean Edit)	Madonna; Dave Hall	Madonna; Hall; Howie Tee^{[a]}	3:19
7.	"Let Down Your Guard" (Rough Single Mix)	Madonna; Austin	Madonna; Austin	3:35
8.	"Love Won't Wait" (Original Demo Edit)	Madonna; Shep Pettibone	Madonna; Pettibone	4:54
Total length:				27:04

Japanese edition bonus track
No.	Title	Writer(s)	Producer(s)	Length
9.	"Secret" (Drum Mix)	Madonna; Austin	Madonna; Austin	5:12
Total length:				32:16

Notes

- ^{^a} signifies a remixer
- ^{^b} signifies an additional producer

== Personnel ==
Credits adapted from the album's liner notes.

- Madonna – producer
- Stuart Price – editing, mixing
- Dan Hirsch – mastering
- William Inglot – mastering
- Johann Delebarre – creative direction
- Paolo Roversi – photography
- Mark Bannerman – booklet illustrations

== Charts ==
Weekly chart performance for Bedtime Stories: The Untold Chapter
Chart (2025)	Peak position
Australian Albums (ARIA)	20
Belgian Albums (Ultratop Flanders)	34
Belgian Albums (Ultratop Wallonia)	80
Croatian International Albums (HDU)	7
Finnish Physical Albums (Suomen virallinen lista)	6
French Albums (SNEP)	102
Hungarian Albums (MAHASZ)	9
Italian Albums (FIMI)	42
Portuguese Albums (AFP)	141
Scottish Albums (Official Charts)	37
Spanish Albums (Promusicae)	12
UK Albums (Official Charts)	95

== Bibliography ==
- Taraborrelli, Randy J. (2002). Madonna: An Intimate Biography. Simon & Schuster. ISBN 9780330454469.
