= Button for Sleep =

Button for Sleep (Bulgarian: Копче за сън) is a Bulgarian children's play, written by Valeri Petrov in 1978. It is a musical with compositions made by Georgi Genkov. Several notable productions of the play have been performed in Bulgarian, including the Youth Theatre "Nikolay Binev" in Sofia under Ivan Urumov, the "Patilan" Municipal Theatre under Anastasia Iankova, the "Ivan Dimov" Dramatic Theatre in Haskovo and Puppet Theatre in Sliven, staged by Zlati Zlatev.
