= Yo Ho Ho =

1981 film by Zako Heskiya

- Theatrical release poster
- Directed by: Zako Heskiya
- Written by: Valeri Petrov
- Produced by: Nikola Vulchev
- Starring: Kiril Variyski; Viktor Chouchkov; Iliya Penev; Anani Anev; Sonya Djulgerova; Kirill Kavadarkov
- Cinematography: Stefan Trifonov
- Distributed by: Boyana Film
- Release dates: July 1981 (Moscow); 5 October 1981 (Bulgaria)
- Running time: 98 minutes
- Country: Bulgaria
- Language: Bulgarian

Yo Ho Ho (Bulgarian: Йо-хо-хо) is a 1981 Bulgarian drama film directed by Zako Heskiya and written by Valeri Petrov. It was entered into the 12th Moscow International Film Festival, where it won the Special Prize. It was remade as the 2006 film The Fall by Tarsem Singh is based on Yo Ho Ho.

== Plot ==
Leonid, a 10-year-old boy with a broken arm befriends a young, paraplegic actor in the hospital. They collaborate on a pirate story in which they play the main roles. The actor's room, also houses a poor old man. In the made-up story, he becomes the pirates' evil foe. Leonid is fascinated.

By degrees, every person in the hospital gets roles in the story. But in order for the story to continue, the boy has to steal bottles of medicine for the actor, who has lost his joy in life and plans to commit suicide. When Leonid falls down and hits his head when stealing a bottle, the actor realises that life has meaning as long as you have friends.

At the end of the story, as in reality, the two win out over their enemy.

== Cast ==
- Kiril Variyski as the Actor / the Black Pirate
- Viktor Chouchkov as Leonid
- Iliya Penev as Unpleasant Old Man / the Governor
- Anani Anev as Gogo / Sitting Bull
- Sonya Djulgerova as Nurse Ceci / Cicilly
- Kirill Kavadarkov as Van Lun
- Georgi Bakhchevanov as Rosko
- Trifon Dzhonev as Luigi
- Boris Lukanov as the Professor
- Rut Spasova as Leonid's mother
- Vasil Stoychev as the Actor's colleague
