= The Fall (2006 film) =

Adventure fantasy film by Tarsem Singh

- Theatrical release poster
- Directed by: Tarsem
- Screenplay by: Dan Gilroy; Nico Soultanakis; Tarsem
- Based on: Yo Ho Ho by: Valeri Petrov; Zako Heskiya
- Produced by: Tarsem
- Starring: Lee Pace; Catinca Untaru; Justine Waddell
- Cinematography: Colin Watkinson
- Edited by: Robert Duffy
- Music by: Krishna Levy
- Production companies: Googly Films; RadicalMedia; Absolute Entertainment; Tree Top Films; Deep Films
- Distributed by: Roadside Attractions (United States); Momentum Pictures (United Kingdom); Summit Entertainment (International)
- Release dates: 9 September 2006 (TIFF); 30 May 2008 (United States); 3 October 2008 (United Kingdom)
- Running time: 117 minutes
- Countries: India; United States; United Kingdom
- Language: English
- Budget: $30 million
- Box office: $4.1 million

The Fall is a 2006 adventure fantasy film produced, co-written, and directed by Tarsem Singh, and starring Lee Pace, Catinca Untaru, and Justine Waddell. It is based on the 1981 Bulgarian film Yo Ho Ho written by Valeri Petrov and directed by Zako Heskiya. The film centers on a young girl (Untaru) who meets a stuntman (Pace) at the hospital they are both staying at, with the latter telling her a fantastic tale involving a group of heroes seeking revenge on an evil ruler.

Presented by David Fincher and Spike Jonze, the film premiered at the 2006 Toronto International Film Festival, before being released in the United States on 9 May 2008, and the United Kingdom on 3 October 2008. In the years since its release, the film had become noteworthy for its lack of distribution and absence from any streaming platforms, with Singh having worked to find distributors to re-release the film worldwide. In July 2024, streaming service Mubi announced their acquisition of select distribution rights to a 4K restoration of the film, which premiered at the Locarno Film Festival before streaming on Mubi on 27 September 2024.

== Plot ==
In 1920's Los Angeles, stuntman Roy Walker is hospitalized, bedridden and paraplegic (possibly permanently) after jumping off a bridge for a stunt for a film. He meets Alexandria, a young Romanian-born patient in the hospital who is recovering from a broken arm, and tells her a story about her namesake, Alexander the Great. Roy promises to tell her an epic tale if she returns the next day.

The next morning, as Roy spins his tale of fantasy, Alexandria's imagination brings his characters to life. Roy's tale is about five heroes: a silent Indian warrior, a bow and arrow-wielding ex-slave named Otta Benga, Italian explosives expert Luigi, Charles Darwin alongside a pet monkey named Wallace, and a masked swashbuckling bandit. The evil ruler Governor Odious has committed an offense against each of the five, and they all seek revenge. They are later joined by a sixth hero, a mystic.

Alexandria vividly imagines people around her appearing as the characters in Roy's story. Although Roy develops affection for Alexandria, he has an ulterior motive: to trick her into stealing morphine from the hospital pharmacy. He intends to use the morphine to die by suicide because the woman he loves has left him for the actor for whom he provided the stunt footage. However, Alexandria brings him only three pills; she threw away the rest, having mistaken the "E" Roy wrote in "morphine" for a "3". The story becomes a collaborative tale to which Alexandria also contributes. The masked bandit, whom Roy intended to represent Alexandria's late father, becomes Roy, and Alexandria is his daughter.

Roy talks Alexandria into stealing a bottle of pills locked in a fellow patient's cabinet, and then downs the contents. As he falls asleep he attempts to finish the story with the Bandit finding love, and he tells Alexandria not to return the next day. She does not obey, and is devastated to see a dead patient being taken away; however, the deceased is Roy's elderly, denture-wearing roommate. Roy awakens and lashes out when he realizes the pills were placebos. Alexandria, desperate to help Roy, sneaks out of bed to the pharmacy. She climbs onto the cabinet but loses her footing, falls, and sustains a severe head injury. She receives surgery, after which she is visited by Roy, who confesses his deception. He pleads with Alexandria to ask someone else to end the story, but she insists on hearing Roy's ending.

Roy reluctantly and drunkenly continues the story. The heroes are betrayed and die one by one, and it seems that Governor Odious will be triumphant. Alexandria becomes increasingly upset, but Roy insists that it is his story to tell and the Bandit is a coward. She declares that it is hers too and begs Roy to let the Bandit live. Roy finally agrees, and the epic tale comes to an end; Governor Odious lays dying and the Bandit and his daughter are alive and together. In a final twist, Roy confronts the character representing his ex-girlfriend. She says the story's pain and suffering were all part of a "test" of the Bandit's love for her. The Bandit rejects her and her manipulations at last.

With the story complete, Roy and Alexandria, along with the patients and staff of the hospital, watch the finished film that Roy appeared in, a Western featuring bandits, a Native American man, and Roy's ex-girlfriend. The crowd is delighted, but Roy's smile is broken in disappointment as he realizes his stunt has been cut from the film.

Alexandria's arm eventually heals and she returns to the orange orchard where her family works. Her voice-over reveals that she believes Roy has recovered and is now back at work again. A montage of cuts from several of silent films' greatest and most dangerous stunts plays; she imagines all the stuntmen to be Roy.

== Cast ==
- Lee Pace as Roy Walker / Black Bandit
- Catinca Untaru as Alexandria / Bandit's daughter
- Justine Waddell as Nurse Evelyn / Sister Evelyn
- Daniel Caltagirone as Sinclair / Governor Odious
- Marcus Wesley as Ice delivery man / Otta Benga
- Robin Smith as One-legged actor / Luigi
- Jeetu Verma as Orange picker / Indian
- Kim Uylenbroek as Doctor / Alexander the Great
- Leo Bill as Orderly / Charles Darwin
- Emil Hoștină as Alexandria's father / Blue Bandit
- Julian Bleach as Mystic / Orange picker
- Ronald France as Otto (the "old man")
- Sean Gilder as Walt Purdy

== Themes ==
The Fall is a self-reflexive film that deals primarily with the concept of storytelling. Roy Walker tells a story to Alexandria, who imagines it, but there is a discontinuity between what he describes and how she sees it. Each character brings their own life into their experiences of the story; Roy takes inspiration from the film that he was working on before his accident, and Alexandria populates his story with familiar sights from her own life. The intimidating X-Ray operator becomes an enemy soldier; the 'Indian' is seen by her as a South Asian immigrant co-worker from the orange groves, while Roy's dialogue makes it clear to the audience that he meant 'Indian' to mean a Native American man from the Western film he was involved in.

The Fall is also grounded in the film's historical period. Roy took inspiration for his story's bandits from early 20th century news; the controversy over credit for Charles Darwin's ideas in On the Origin of Species between Darwin and Alfred Russel Wallace, as well as Ota Benga's imprisonment in the Louisiana Purchase Exposition in St. Louis, Missouri were prominent news stories around the time period of the film's setting.

== Production ==
Tarsem largely financed the film with his own funds, and paid members of the cast and crew on an equal basis rather than in more typical Hollywood fashion. The film was made over a period of four years and incorporates footage shot in 24 countries, including India, Indonesia (Bali), Italy, France, Spain, Namibia, and China (PRC). Singh stressed the importance of on-location filming and lack of visual effects, as he found that modern techniques would not age well in comparison. He only took advertising jobs in places that he wanted to do location scouting for, and flew cast members to shoot scenes for the film using the same crew as he did for commercials. When shooting scenes of the blue city in Jodhpur, Tarsem provided locals with blue paint to refresh the paint on their houses. This alternative to post-production effects resulted in the vibrant blue of the city in the film. Another location, the contemporary South African mental hospital which represents an early 20th-century Los Angeles hospital (the principal setting throughout the film) remained operational (in a separate wing) during filming.

Tarsem revealed in a 2024 interview that Elle Fanning was considered to play Alexandria and even met with her prior to the film's casting.

Lee Pace remained in a bed and used a wheelchair for most of the early filming at the director's suggestion, convincing most of the crew that he was in fact unable to walk. The intention, Tarsem and Pace noted, was to maximize the realism of Roy's physical limitations in the eyes of Catinca Untaru, whose lines and reactions as the character Alexandria were largely unscripted. Alexandria's misinterpreting the letter E as the number 3 in a note written by Roy came about from an accidental misreading by the 6-year-old actress during filming, which the director adapted into a twist in the story. Tarsem had portions of the hospital scenes between Catinca and Pace filmed through small holes in the hospital bed curtains, maximizing their spontaneous interactions despite the presence of the film crew surrounding them.

The film features a dream sequence animation created by Christoph Lauenstein and Wolfgang Lauenstein, with costume design from Eiko Ishioka.

A behind the scenes two part documentary titled Nostalgia and Wonderlust was released in 2008. Nostalgia was co-directed by Nico Soultanakis, the producer of The Fall and Ian Soroka. Wonderlust was directed by Soultanakis.

=== Filming locations ===
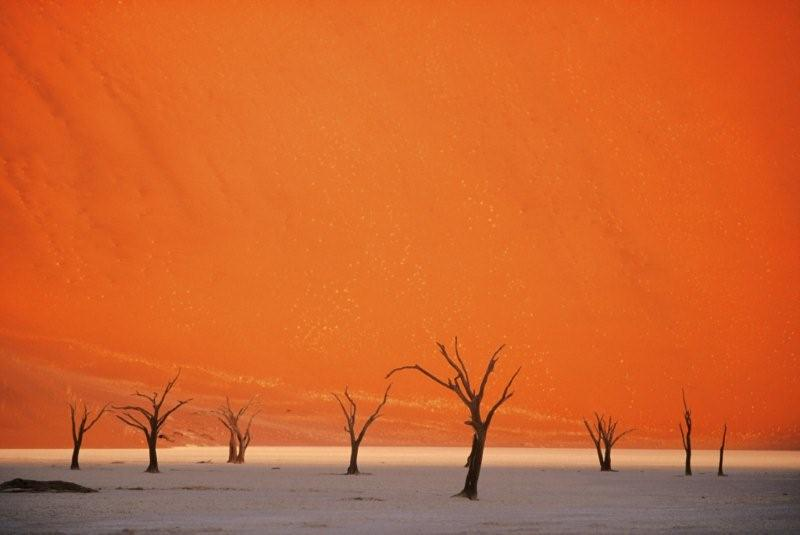
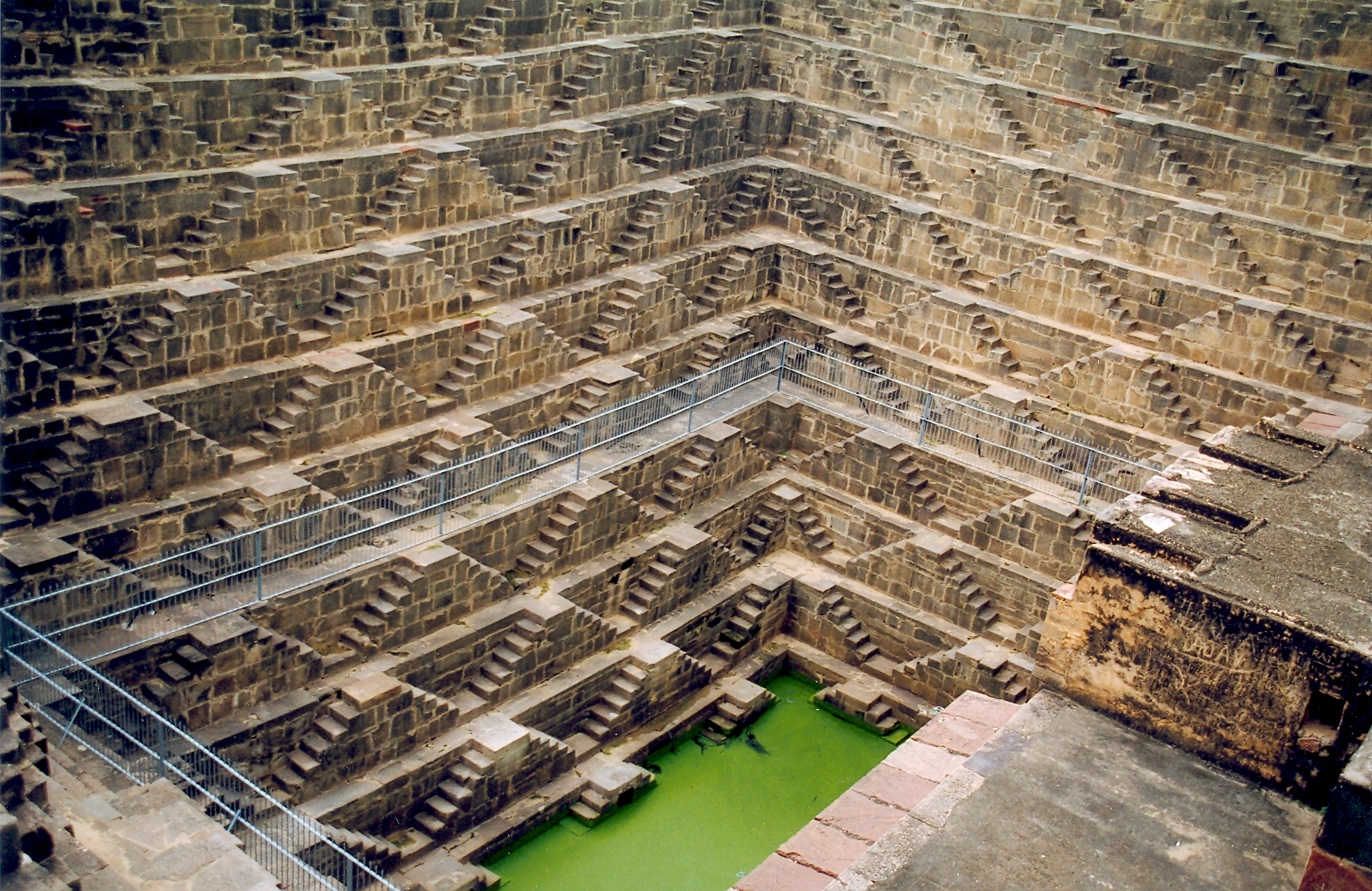
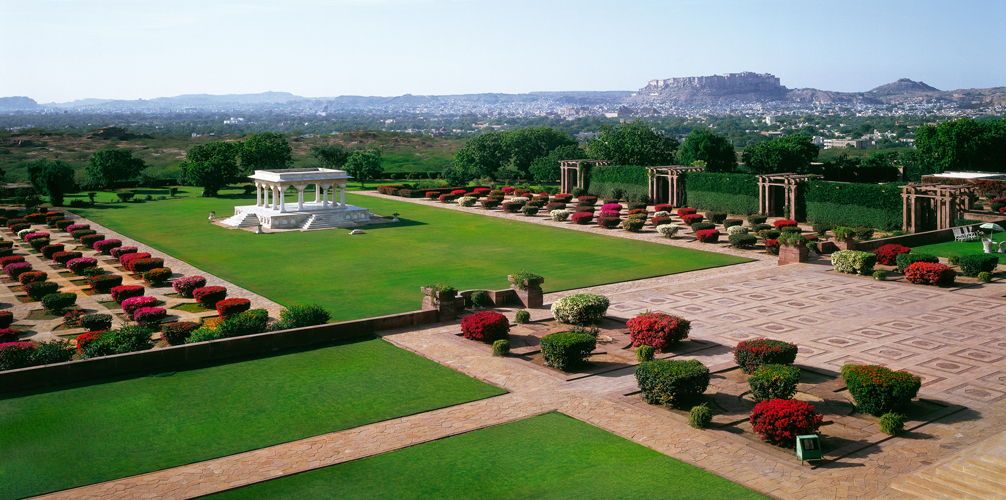
Filming locations include Deadvlei, Chand Baori and Umaid Bhawan Palace
- Valkenberg Hospital in Cape Town, South Africa
- Deadvlei from the Sossusvlei dune in Namib-Naukluft National Park in Namibia
- The labyrinth Jantar Mantar in Jaipur
- Lake Palace Hotel in Udaipur, India
- Charles Bridge in Prague, Czech Republic
- Butterfly reef NE of Mana Island, Fiji (Coordinates: -17.672339, 177.131704)
- Ubud, Bali Island, Indonesia
- Andaman Islands of India
- Pangong Tso in Ladakh, India
- Buland Darwaza in the palace complex of Fatehpur Sikri, Uttar Pradesh, India
- Agra
- Magnetic Hill in Ladakh, India
- Moonscape near Lamayuru Monastery in Ladakh, India
- Gunung Kawi, Bali Island, Indonesia
- Chand Baori, a large stepwell in Abhaneri village in the Indian state of Rajasthan
- Jodhpur, the Blue City in Rajasthan
- Umaid Bhawan Palace Lobby, Jodhpur, Rajasthan
- Taj Mahal, India
- Jardín Botánico de Buenos Aires, Argentina
- Jardín Zoológico de Buenos Aires, Argentina
- Teatro Opera Buenos Aires, Argentina
- Capitoline Hill, Colosseum, Roma, Italy
- Hadrian's Villa, Tivoli, Italy
- Hagia Sophia, Istanbul, Turkey
- First Statue of Liberty at Île aux Cygnes in Paris, France

== Release ==
=== Original release ===
The Fall premiered at the 2006 Toronto International Film Festival. According to Tarsem, the Weinstein Company expressed serious interest into theatrically distributing the film in the United States back in 2006/07, but turned down distributing the film after its founder Harvey Weinstein walked out of the film's cut after 15 minutes during its test screening since he could not understand the film's plot. Tarsem claimed that Weinstein even tried to sabotage the film after he walked out of the film's screening and was forced not to release the film for two years until 2008 with a different distributor and its original international sales being handled by Summit Entertainment; Tarsem confirmed this in a 2024 interview in light of the aftermath of Harvey Weinstein's scandal. Prior to this, Warner Independent Pictures had also been interested in distributing the film. It was theatrically released on 9 May 2008, by Roadside Attractions, with a DVD and Blu-ray release through Sony Pictures Home Entertainment on 9 September 2008.

Despite the fact that David Fincher and Spike Jonze had no part in the creation of the movie, they allowed their names to be attached to the project as presenters to help it reach a wider audience and secure distribution.

== Critical reception and legacy ==
On review aggregator Rotten Tomatoes, the film holds a 64% approval rating based on 116 reviews, with an average rating of 6.3/10. The website's critics consensus reads, "More visually elaborate than the fragmented story can sometimes support, The Fall walks the line between labor of love and filmmaker self-indulgence." Metacritic, which uses a weighted average, assigned the film a score of 64 out of 100 based on 23 critics, indicating "generally favorable reviews".

Roger Ebert of the Chicago Sun-Times gave the film four stars out of four and wrote, "You might want to see [it] for no other reason than because it exists. There will never be another like it." He later named it among his top 20 films of 2008. Nathan Lee of The New York Times, however, wrote that the film "is a genuine labor of love—and a real bore."

New Zealand filmmaker Peter Jackson later cast Lee Pace as Thranduil in the Hobbit trilogy after being impressed by his performance in The Fall.

The film appeared on several critics' top ten lists of the best films of 2008. Tasha Robinson of The A.V. Club named it the best film of 2008, and Sean Axmaker of the Seattle Post-Intelligencer named it the 6th best film of 2008.

Julia Roberts named it as one of her favourite films during a 2023 interview with Letterboxd.

In 2025, it was one of the films voted for the "Readers' Choice" edition of The New York Times' list of "The 100 Best Movies of the 21st Century", finishing at number 214.

In April 2026, The Fall made it into Letterboxd's top 250 films with an average member rating of 4.26 out of 5. As of October 2026, it has climbed to number 184.

=== 4K restoration ===
Prior to September 2024, The Fall had been unavailable on streaming services or rental services, making it notoriously difficult to access with second-hand Blu-ray copies of the film being very expensive on secondary markets as it had gone out of print. At the 2023 Toronto International Film Festival, Tarsem discussed the possibility of releasing a 4K restoration of the film, although a major issue was finding a physical label or streaming service that would distribute it in the highest quality possible. When asked if he had approached The Criterion Collection to issue the restored film, Tarsem replied, "We have. It was the strangest thing, they kind of have not responded to it... Criterion doesn't seem to think it's their kind of film, which is bizarre." Tarsem remained optimistic about a streaming release, "It's just countries like Japan and all reach out individually and say, 'Can we have it?' And we've been able to solve that, but right now, I’d love for it to stream in some way."

In July 2024, Mubi announced that they had acquired rights to the 4K restoration of The Fall for North and Latin America, the United Kingdom, Ireland, Germany, Austria, Switzerland, Italy, Benelux, Turkey and India, with its subsidiary The Match Factory handling sales elsewhere. The restoration premiered at the Locarno Film Festival, following which Mubi released it on their streaming service on 27 September 2024, marking the first time the film has been made available on a streaming service. As of 2026, the movie is also available on other streaming services.

== See also ==
- List of films with longest production time
