= List of World War II feature films (1950–1989) =

This list of World War II films (1950–1989) contains fictional feature films or miniseries released since 1950 which feature events of World War II in the narrative.

The entries on this list are war films or miniseries that are concerned with World War II (or the Sino-Japanese War) and include events which feature as a part of the war effort.

== Common topics ==
Many aspects of this conflict have repeatedly been the subject of drama. These common subjects will not be linked when they appear in the film descriptions below:

Europe

- Adolf Hitler, Nazis and Nazism
- Nazi Germany and the Third Reich
- Gestapo and SS
- Benito Mussolini
- Death camps, Nazi concentration camps, earlier concentration camps
- Partition and occupation of Poland and Polish resistance
- Occupied France, Vichy France and French Resistance
- Occupied Norway
- The Holocaust

Asia–Pacific

- Emperor Hirohito

Non-geographical

- POW

== 1950s ==
=== 1950–1954 ===
Year	Country	Main title (Alternative titles)	Original title (Original script)	Director	Battles, campaigns, events depicted
1950	United States	The Admiral Was a Lady		Albert S. Rogell	Comedy. End of war readjustment of returning American servicemen and servicewomen
1950	United States	American Guerrilla in the Philippines		Fritz Lang	Japanese occupation of the Philippines filmed on location
1950	United Kingdom	The Angel with the Trumpet		Anthony Bushell	Drama based on Ernst Lothar novel. Anschluss, 1938. NOTE: this movie has nothing to do with World War 2
1950	United States	At War with the Army		Hal Walker	Stateside GIs await transfer overseas
1950	United States	The Big Lift		Fritz Lang	Drama. Berlin Airlift, 1948, and transition to Cold War in Berlin's occupied sectors
1950	United States	Breakthrough		Lewis Seiler	Company B of the 1st Infantry Division from the D-Day landings through the Normandy campaign.
1950	United States	Francis		Arthur Lubin	Comedy. Francis the Talking Mule unmasks Japanese spy in China Burma India Theater
1950	United States	Halls of Montezuma		Lewis Milestone	US Marines attack Japanese-held island in Pacific Ocean theater of World War II
1950	Philippines	Mapuputing Kamay	Mapuputing Kamay	Fausto J. Galauran	Filipina nurses in battles of Bataan and Corregidor
1950	United States	The Men (Battle Stripe)		Fred Zinnemann	Drama. Paraplegic American veteran's struggle re-entering society
1950	United Kingdom	Morning Departure (Operation Disaster)		Roy Ward Baker	Drama. British submarine on routine patrol encountering derelict war mine
1950	United States	Mystery Submarine (Phantom Submarine)		Douglas Sirk	Thriller. US Navy Intelligence officer posing as ex-German medical officer to rescue kidnapped scientist and sink U-boat off South American coast
1950	United Kingdom	Odette		Herbert Wilcox	SOE agent Odette Samson
1950	India	Samadhi	Samādhi (समाधि)	Ramesh Saigal	Drama concerning Subhas Chandra Bose and the Indian National Army.
1950	Italy	The Sky Is Red	Il cielo è rosso	Claudio Gora	The life of a 16 year old Italian boy after an Allied bombing has killed his parents and destroyed his town
1950	United States	Three Came Home		Jean Negulesco	Battle of Borneo, 1941–42, civilian internees and POWs of the Japanese
1950	Poland	Unvanquished City	Miasto nieujarzmione	Jerzy Zarzycki	Warsaw, Poland, 1944
1950	United States	When Willie Comes Marching Home		John Ford	Comedy based on Sy Gomberg story. Failed pilot's escapades, from homefront to German-occupied France and back
1950	United Kingdom	The Wooden Horse		Jack Lee	True story of British POWs' escape attempts from Stalag Luft III
1951	Philippines	Alliance of Philippine Patriots ^{†}	Makapili (Makabayan Katipunan Ñg Mg̃a Pilipino)	unknown	Makapili, Japanese sympathizers, during Japanese Occupation of the Philippines
1951	Italy	Attention! Bandits!	Achtung! Banditi!	Carlo Lizzani	Italian Resistance
1951	United States	Decision Before Dawn		Anatole Litvak	Allies use German POWs as spies in Nazi Germany, 1945
1951	United States	The Desert Fox: The Story of Rommel		Henry Hathaway	German Field Marshal Erwin Rommel from Second Battle of El Alamein to July 20 plot
1951	United States	Fighting Coast Guard		Joseph Kane	US Coast Guard prepares for war
1951	United States	Flying Leathernecks		Nicholas Ray	US Marine fighter pilot in Pacific Ocean theater of World War II
1951	United States	Force of Arms		Michael Curtiz	US Fifth Army in Italian Campaign
1951	United States	The Frogmen		Lloyd Bacon, Dick Mayberry	US Navy underwater demolition team divers/commandos in South West Pacific Theatre
1951	United States	Go For Broke!		Robert Pirosh	US Army 442nd Regimental Combat Team in Italy and France
1951	United States	I Was an American Spy		Lesley Selander	American spy and Medal of Freedom winner Clara Fuentes during Japanese occupation of Philippines
1951	United States; Austria	The Magic Face		Frank Tuttle	Actor becomes Hitler's valet, murders him and takes his place
1951	Italy	My Trieste! ^{†}	Trieste mia!	Mario Costa	Two Italian soldiers are chased by the Germans and Yugoslav partisans in Trieste after the Italian armistice
1951	United States	Operation Pacific		George Waggner	US Navy submarine in South West Pacific Theatre
1951	United States	Purple Heart Diary		Richard Quine	Singers entertain wounded soldiers in the Pacific
1951	United States	Submarine Command		John Farrow	Drama. Career of US submarine commander up to Korean War
1951	United States	The Tanks Are Coming		Lewis Seiler	Action-drama. US 3rd Armored Division tank crew in France and German Siegfried Line, Fall 1944
1951	United States	Target Unknown		George Sherman	Drama. Tense and discontented American bomber squadron forced to parachute over France before being interrogated by Nazis
1951	United States	Wild Blue Yonder (Thunder Across the Pacific)		Allan Dwan	US Air Force men are trained to pilot the B-29 and then fly bombing actions on Japan
1951	United States	You're in the Navy Now		Henry Hathaway	Comedy. Inexperienced crew assigned to experimental US submarine chaser
1952	United States	Above and Beyond		Melvin Frank, Norman Panama	Col. Paul Tibbets and atomic bomb attack on Hiroshima
1952	United Kingdom	Angels One Five		George More O'Ferrall	RAF fighter squadron in the Battle of Britain
1952	United Kingdom	Appointment in London		Philip Leacock	RAF Bomber Command wing commander's attempt to finish his final tour of operations
1952	Italy	Black Feathers	Penne nere	Oreste Biancoli	Veteran Alpini become partisans after the German occupation of Italy
1952	Japan	Children of Hiroshima	Genbaku no ko (原爆の子)	Kaneto Shindō	Dropping of Little Boy on Hiroshima
1952	United States	Eight Iron Men		Edward Dmytryk	During WW2 in Italy, a soldier trapped in no man's land.
1952	Norway	Emergency Landing	Nødlanding	Arne Skouen	American bomber crew shot down in Norway and aided by Milorg (Norwegian Resistance)
1952	United States	5 Fingers		Joseph L. Mankiewicz	Drama/Thriller. Cicero Affair involving German spy Elyesa Bazna
1952	United States	Flat Top		Lesley Selander	Pilot training aboard US Navy carriers
1952	France	Forbidden Games	Jeux interdits	René Clément	Life for youngsters during the Occupation of France
1952	United Kingdom	Gift Horse		Compton Bennett	Fictional story to destroy a German navy dry dock, based on the real St Nazaire Raid
1952	Italy	Heroic Charge	Carica eroica	Francesco De Robertis	Charge of the Savoia Cavalleria at Isbuscenskij
1952	Romania	Mitrea Cocor	Mitrea Cocor	Victor Iliu, Marietta Sadova	
1952	Italy	Nobody Has Betrayed ^{†}	Nessuno ha tradito	Roberto Bianchi Montero	Italian Civil War
1952	United States	Okinawa		Leigh Jason	US Navy destroyer at the Battle of Okinawa
1952	United States	Operation Secret		Lewis Seiler	Espionage with the French Resistance based on the life of Peter Ortiz
1952	United States	Red Ball Express		Budd Boetticher	Transportation units in European Theater of Operations
1952	Italy	Shadows on Trieste ^{†}	Ombre su Trieste	Nerino Florio Bianchi	Four Italian deserters and smugglers join Yugoslav partisans in Trieste
1952	United States	Thunderbirds		John H. Auer	The 45th Infantry Division in Italy
1952	United States	Torpedo Alley (Down Periscope)		Lew Landers	Drama. Failed US carrier pilot's return to service on submarine
1952	Sweden	U-Boat 39 (Submarine no. 39)	Ubåt 39	Hampe Faustman	Drama. Crew of U-39
1953	France; United States	Act of Love		Anatole Litvak	Romance drama based on Alfred Hayes novel. American soldier falls in love with Parisian woman near end of war
1953	United Kingdom	Albert R.N. (Break to Freedom)		Lewis Gilbert	British POWs in German Stalag
1953	Japan	Anatahan	Ana-ta-han (アナタハン)	Josef von Sternberg	Japanese soldiers on South West Pacific Theatre island battle after end of war
1953	United States	China Venture		Don Siegel	Adventure-drama. American commandos sent to South China to rescue prisoner held by Chinese guerrillas
1953	United Kingdom	The Cruel Sea		Charles Frend	Battle of the Atlantic from perspective of Royal Navy ships
1953	United States	The Desert Rats		Robert Wise	Australian 9th Division at Tobruk during North African campaign
1953	United States	Destination Gobi		Robert Wise	US Navy weather unit in Mongolia
1953	Japan	Eagle of the Pacific (Operation Kamikaze)	Taiheiyo no washi (太平洋の鷲)	Ishirō Honda	Admiral Isoroku Yamamoto
1953	United States	El Alaméin		Fred F. Sears	Second Battle of El Alamein
1953	United States	Fighter Attack		Lesley Selander	Partisans in Italian Campaign
1953	United States	From Here to Eternity		Fred Zinnemann	1953 Best Picture culminating in the Attack on Pearl Harbor
1953	United States	The Girls of Pleasure Island		Alvin Ganzer, F. Hugh Herbert	Comedy. Pacific Theatre and English family living on atoll invaded by US Marines near end of war
1953	United States	The Glass Wall		Maxwell Shane	Drama. DP camp survivor in New York City
1953	United States	Guerrilla Girl		John Christian	Greek Resistance
1953	Italy	Hell Raiders of the Deep	I sette dell'Orsa maggiore	Duilio Coletti	Decima Flottiglia MAS
1953	Japan	The Lily Tower ^{†}	Himeyuri no Tō (ひめゆりの塔)	Tadashi Imai	A group of high school girls trained as nurses witness the horrors of war first-hand on Okinawa
1953	United States	Little Boy Lost		George Seaton	Drama. American war correspondent stationed in Paris before Battle of Dunkirk searching for his French family lost during war
1953	United Kingdom	Malta Story		Brian Desmond Hurst	Siege of Malta in 1942
1953	Italy	The Patrol of Amba Alagi ^{†}	La pattuglia dell'Amba Alagi	Flavio Calzavara	A veteran of the second Battle of Amba Alagi meets the families of his fallen comrades
1953	United Kingdom	The Red Beret		Terence Young	British paratroopers and Operation Biting
1953	United Kingdom	Single-Handed (Sailor of the King)		Roy Boulting	Action-drama based on C. S. Forester novel Brown on Resolution. Royal Navy
1953	United States	South Sea Woman (The Marines Had a Word for It)		Arthur Lubin	Comedy. Pacific Theatre escapades of US Marine court martialed for events leading to Pearl Harbor
1953	United States	Stalag 17		Billy Wilder	Allies in German Stalag Luft
1953	Canada	Tit-Coq	Tit-Coq	René Delacroix, Gratien Gélinas	Return home of French-Canadian soldier nicknamed "Little Rooster"
1954	United States	Beachhead		Stuart Heisler	Four US Marines on a reconnaissance mission in the Solomon Islands
1954	United States	Betrayed		Gottfried Reinhardt	Dutch resistance in Battle of Arnhem
1954	United States	The Caine Mutiny		Edward Dmytryk	Destroyer warfare in South West Pacific Theatre
1954	West Germany	Canaris: Master Spy (Deadly Decision)	Canaris	Alfred Weidenmann	Drama. Abwehr Chief Admiral Canaris and Widerstand
1954	West Germany	08/15	08/15 – In der Kaserne	Paul May	Drama. End of war for German soldiers; first of three parts
1954	Italy	Folgore Division	Divisione Folgore	Duilio Coletti	185th Infantry Division "Folgore" in 1942
1954	Italy	Frogwoman (Frogman Spy)	Mizar (Sabotaggio in mare)	Francesco De Robertis	Italian frogman is helped by a frogwoman
1954	Italy	Goodbye Naples!	Addio Napoli!	Roberto Bianchi Montero	Drama. Espionage in Naples under Allied occupation
1954	Italy	Human Torpedoes	Siluri umani	Antonio Leonviola	Raid on Souda Bay by Italian Commandos
1954	Austria; Yugoslavia	The Last Bridge	Die Letzte Brücke (in German); Posljednji most (in Serbo-Croatian)	Helmut Käutner	German nurse is sent to the front as a punishment for tending a wounded Yugoslav partisan
1954	China	Letter with Feather	Jī máo xìn (鸡毛信)	Shi Hui	Boy attempts to deliver important message to 8th Route Army while evading Imperial Japanese forces during Sino-Japanese War
1954	Spain	The Patrol	La patrulla	Pedro Lazaga	Spanish volunteer Blue Division on Eastern Front
1954	United Kingdom	The Purple Plain		Robert Parrish	RAF evaders in Burma campaign
1954	United Kingdom	The Sea Shall Not Have Them		Lewis Gilbert	Channel Air Sea Rescue of Allied bomber crew
1954	Italy	Shadow Men ^{†}	Uomini ombra	Francesco De Robertis	Intelligence service of the Regia Marina
1954	United Kingdom; Norway	Shetland Gang (Suicide Mission)	Shetlandsgjengen	Michael Forlong	Docudrama. "Shetland bus", Norwegian smugglers in North Sea
1954	United States	Silent Raiders		Richard Bartlett	Fictitious story of US Army Rangers at the Dieppe Raid
1954	India	That Day!	Andha Naal (அந்த நாள்) (in Tamil)	S. Balachander	Fictitious story of a scientist and radio operator who spies for Japan during the Second World War and is killed by his wife.
1954	United Kingdom	They Who Dare		Lewis Milestone	SAS raid in occupied Greece

=== 1955–1959 ===
Year	Country	Main title (Alternative titles)	Original title (Original script)	Director	Battles, campaigns, events depicted
1955	Italy	The Abandoned	Gli sbandati	Francesco Maselli	The beginning of partisan warfare in Italy after the Armistice
1955	United Kingdom	Above Us the Waves		Ralph Thomas	Submarine attacks on German battleship Tirpitz
1955	United States	Bad Day at Black Rock		John Sturges	Thriller. Disabled veteran tries to deliver a medal
1955	United States	Battle Cry		Raoul Walsh	US Marines and battles of Guadalcanal, Tarawa, Saipan
1955	United Kingdom	The Cockleshell Heroes		José Ferrer	Royal Marine commandos launch Operation Frankton
1955	United Kingdom	The Colditz Story		Guy Hamilton	British, Dutch and French POWs in special "escape-proof" castle prison
1955	United Kingdom	The Dam Busters		Michael Anderson	RAF bombers launch Operation Chastise against German dams using the bouncing bomb
1955	West Germany; Austria	The Devil's General	Des Teufels General	Helmut Käutner	Drama based on Gen. Ernst Udet. Successful Luftwaffe General courted by Widerstand
1955	West Germany	08/15 – Part 2	08/15 – Im Krieg (08/15 – Zweiter Teil)	Paul May	Drama. End of war for German soldiers; second of three parts
1955	West Germany	08/15 at Home	08/15 – In der Heimat	Paul May	Drama. End of war for German soldiers; third of three parts
1955	United Kingdom	The End of the Affair		Edward Dmytryk	Romance drama. British homefront and illicit romance
1955	East Germany	Ernst Thälmann – Leader of his Class	Ernst Thälmann – Führer seiner Klasse	Kurt Maetzig	Drama. Ernst Thälmann leads Communist opposition to Hitler
1955	United States	The Eternal Sea		John H. Auer	Follows the career of US Navy Captain John Hoskins (officer) during the Pacific War
1955	France	The Fugitives	Les évadés	Jean-Paul Le Chanois	Two French prisoners escape from German POW camp
1955	Poland	A Generation	Pokolenie	Andrzej Wajda	Polish resistance against German occupation
1955	West Germany	Hanussen, Hitler's Astrologer	Hanussen	O. W. Fischer, Georg Marischka	Drama. Jewish psychic Erik Jan Hanussen collaborates with Nazis
1955	West Germany; Austria	Hitler: The Last Ten Days (The Last Act)	Der letzte Akt	Georg Wilhelm Pabst	Drama based on novel by Nuremberg judge Michael Musmanno. Hitler's last days in Reichstag bunker through perspective of bunker guard
1955	Poland	The Hours of Hope	Godziny nadziei	Stanisław Bareja, Jan Rybkowski	Drama set in Poland near the end of the war
1955	United States	It's Always Fair Weather		Stanley Donen, Gene Kelly	Musical comedy-drama. US soldiers vowing to reunite after war in 1955
1955	West Germany	Jackboot Mutiny	Es geschah am 20. Juli	Georg Wilhelm Pabst	July 20 plot to assassinate Hitler
1955	Poland	Men of the Blue Cross	Błękitny krzyż	Andrzej Munk	Tatra Mountains, Poland on Eastern Front, 1945
1955	United States	Mister Roberts		John Ford, Mervyn LeRoy	Comedy-drama. US Navy cargo ship in South Pacific
1955	Malaya	Sergeant Hassan	Sarjan Hassan	Lamberto V. Avellana, P. Ramlee	Action drama. Malayan occupation and Royal Malay Regiment
1955	Hungary	Springtime in Budapest	Budapesti tavasz	Félix Máriássy	Drama. Siege of Budapest
1955	Italy	Submarine Attack (Torpedo Zone)	La grande speranza	Duilio Coletti	Action/Romance. Italian submarine sinking Allied shipping on Eastern Atlantic Theatre and rescuing occasional survivor
1955	Denmark	There Came One Day	Der kom en dag	Sven Methling	Based on Flemming Muus novel. Last days of Danish occupation
1955	United States	To Hell and Back		Jesse Hibbs	Audie Murphy, most decorated US soldier
1955	Finland	The Unknown Soldier	Tuntematon sotilas	Edvin Laine	Finno-Soviet Continuation War
1956	Spain	Ambassadors in Hell	Embajadores en el infierno	José María Forqué	Drama based on Torcuato Luca de Tena novel. Spanish Blue Division volunteers from Siege of Leningrad and Battle of Krasny Bor imprisoned in Soviet Gulag
1956	United States	Attack		Robert Aldrich	Infantrymen in France after D-Day
1956	United States	Away All Boats		Joseph Pevney	US NavyAttack transport operating in the Pacific
1956	United Kingdom	The Battle of the River Plate (Pursuit of the Graf Spee)		Michael Powell, Emeric Pressburger	Battle of the River Plate between German and British forces. The first naval battle of the war
1956	United States	Battle Stations		Lewis Seiler	US Navy battleship in the Pacific Ocean theater of World War II
1956	United States	Between Heaven and Hell		Richard Fleischer	US Army National Guard unit in Philippines
1956	United Kingdom	The Black Tent		Brian Desmond Hurst	British soldier helps local tribes fight the Germans during the North African campaign
1956	United States	The Bold and the Brave		Lewis R. Foster	US soldiers serving during the Italian Campaign
1956	Japan	The Burmese Harp	Biruma no tategoto (ビルマの竪琴)	Kon Ichikawa	Japanese soldiers fighting in the Burma campaign
1956	United States	D-Day the Sixth of June		Henry Koster	Story of Operation Overlord, the Normandy invasion by Allied forces
1956	Italy	Farewell, My Village... ^{†}	Ciao, pais...	Osvaldo Langini	Alpini on the Greek front
1956	United States	Gaby		Curtis Bernhardt	Romance/Drama. British homefront and ballerina falling for American soldier sent to France, 1944
1953	Italy	The House of Intrigue	Londra chiama Polo Nord	Duilio Coletti	A British radio operator is captured by the Germans and forced to send fake messages back to London
1956	Poland	Kanał (Kanal)	Kanał	Andrzej Wajda	Polish resistance during the Warsaw Uprising in 1944
1956	France	A Man Escaped	Un condamné à mort s'est échappé (Le vent souffle où il veut)	Robert Bresson	Thriller based on memoirs of POW André Devigny. French Resistance and Gestapo prison : Montluc Prison.
1956	United Kingdom	The Man Who Never Was		Ronald Neame	Battle of Sicily and Operation Mincemeat A fake officer washes up on the coast of Spain as a cover for an invasion.
1956	Italy	The Price of Glory ^{†}	Il prezzo della gloria	Antonio Musu	Italian torpedo boat Sagittario
1956	United Kingdom	Private's Progress		John Boulting	Comedy. Reluctantly conscripted/commissioned soldier and art heist behind German lines
1956	United States	The Proud and Profane		George Seaton	Romance drama. Red Cross volunteer in South Pacific, New Caledonia and husband's death at Battle of Guadalcanal
1956	United Kingdom	Reach for the Sky		Lewis Gilbert	RAF Officer Douglas Bader and the Battle of Britain
1956	United States	The Revolt of Mamie Stover		Raoul Walsh	Sydney Boehm The Revolt of Mamie Stover; 1951 novel by William Bradford Huie
1956	Yugoslavia	The Siege	Opsada	Branko Marjanovic	Comedy-drama. Zagreb Underground and Yugoslav Front
1956	United Kingdom	A Town Like Alice (Rape of Malaya)		Jack Lee	British and Australian POWs after Battle of Singapore
1956	Yugoslavia	Valley of Peace (Sergeant Jim)	Dolina miru (in Slovene); Dolina mira (in Serbo-Croatian)	France Štiglic	African-American pilot down behind enemy lines rescues two orphans
1957	United Kingdom	The Betrayal		Ernest Morris	Crime thriller. Allied pilot captured and tortured by Nazis and postwar search for his betrayer
1957	France	Bitter Victory	Amère victoire	Nicholas Ray	Action-drama. Allied commando mission behind enemy lines in Benghazi and Western Desert campaign
1957	United Kingdom	The Bridge on the River Kwai		David Lean	1957 Best Picture depicting British POWs work on Burma Railway
1957	Soviet Union	The Cranes Are Flying	Letyat zhuravli (Летят журавли)	Mikhail Kalatozov	Romance drama. Soviet homefront
1957	United States	Don't Go Near the Water		Charles Walters	Comedy-romance. US Navy public relations unit stationed on South West Pacific Theatre island
1957	United States	The Enemy Below		Dick Powell	South Atlantic and cat-and-mouse action between US destroyer and U-boat
1957	West Germany	The Fox of Paris	Der Fuchs von Paris	Paul May	Battle of Normandy from Wehrmacht perspective
1957	United States	Heaven Knows, Mr. Allison		John Huston	US Marine and Catholic nun trapped on enemy island in Pacific Ocean theater of World War II
1957	United States	Hellcats of the Navy		Nathan Juran	Submarine warfare in Pacific Theatre
1957	United States	Kiss Them for Me		Stanley Donen	Comedy. US Navy pilots on leave in San Francisco
1957	Norway	Nine Lives	Ni Liv	Arne Skouen	Drama. Biography of Jan Baalsrud's, Norwegian Resistance fighter, epic escape to neutral Sweden following Tromsø sabotage operation
1957	United Kingdom	The One That Got Away		Roy Ward Baker	Escape of German POW Franz von Werra
1957	United States	Operation Mad Ball		Richard Quine	Comedy-romance. Closing of US Army hospital in France at end of war
1957	West Germany	Sharks and Little Fish	Haie und kleine Fische	Frank Wisbar	Drama. German naval cadets entering Kriegsmarine and U-boat service, 1940
1957	West Germany	The Star of Africa	Der Stern von Afrika	Alfred Weidenmann	Docudrama. Luftwaffe ace (Experten) Hans-Joachim Marseille
1957	United Kingdom	The Steel Bayonet		Michael Carreras	Small British recce force surrounded by overwhelming forces of Afrika Korps during Tunisian campaign
1957	Italy	Tanks of El Alamein	El Alamein (Deserto di gloria)	Guido Malatesta	Second Battle of El Alamein
1957	United States	The Wings of Eagles		John Ford	Drama. US Navy pilot Frank Wead in Pacific Theater
1957	Italy	The Woman Who Came from the Sea	La donna che venne dal mare	Francesco De Robertis	Espionage and Italian frogmen in Gibraltar.
1958	Italy; West Germany	Always Victorious	Pezzo, capopezzo e capitano (in Italian)	Wolfgang Staudte	Comedy. Italian submarine chaser
1958	Poland	Ashes and Diamonds	Popiół i diament	Andrzej Wajda	Anti-Communist resistance in Poland just after the war's end
1958	Czechoslovakia	At That Time, at Christmas...	Tenkrát o Vánocích	Karel Kachyňa	Czechoslovak Army on Eastern Front, Christmas 1944
1958	West Germany	Battle of Monte Cassino	Die grünen Teufel von Monte Cassino	Harald Reinl	1. Fallschirmjägerdivision in the Battle of Monte Cassino
1958	United Kingdom	Battle of the V-1		Vernon Sewell	Polish resistance spies on German rocket tests
1958	United Kingdom	The Camp on Blood Island		Val Guest	British and Dutch POWs in Malaya
1958	United Kingdom	Carve Her Name with Pride		Lewis Gilbert	SOE agent Violette Szabo serving in Nazi-occupied France
1958	Poland	Con Bravura (With Bravery)	Con Bravura	Andrzej Munk	Couriers crossing Polish/Slovak Tatra Mountains; third part of Eroica cut by director
1958	Poland	Cross of Valour	Krzyż Walecznych	Kazimierz Kutz	Short stories from the Eastern Front, 1945
1958	United States	Darby's Rangers		William Wellman	US Army Rangers at Battle of Anzio and Battle of Cisterna
1958	Poland	Deserter	Dezerter	Witold Lesiewicz	Silesian Pole conscripted in Wehrmacht
1958	West Germany	The Doctor of Stalingrad	Der Arzt von Stalingrad	Géza von Radványi	Battle of Stalingrad
1958	United Kingdom	Dunkirk		Leslie Norman	Operation Dynamo and Dunkirk evacuation
1958	Poland	Eroica (Heroism)	Eroica	Andrzej Munk	Warsaw Uprising and POW camp, 1944–45
1958	China	The Eternal Wave (Continuous Wave)	Yong bu xiao shi de dian bo (永不消逝的电波)	Wang Ping	Drama based on true story. Chinese agents in Japanese-held Shanghai, 1939
1958	United States	Fräulein (1958)		Henry Koster	Comedy-romance. Escaped American POW hiding in Berlin near end of war
1958	Poland	Free City	Wolne miasto	Stanisław Różewicz	Free City of Danzig, Polish Campaign, 1939
1958	United Kingdom	Ice Cold in Alex		J. Lee Thompson	North African campaign
1958	United States	Imitation General		George Marshall	Comedy. US Army Sergeant impersonating fallen general to inspire comrades in France
1958	United States	In Love and War		Philip Dunne	Drama. US Marines on shore leave in San Francisco before returning to battle
1958	United Kingdom	The Inn of the Sixth Happiness		Mark Robson	English missionary in China during Sino-Japanese War
1958	United Kingdom	I Was Monty's Double (Hell, Heaven or Hoboken)		John Guillermin	Diversionary D-Day impersonation of General Montgomery
1958	United Kingdom	The Key		Carol Reed	Battle of the Atlantic
1958	United States	Kings Go Forth		Delmer Daves	Action/Romance. Soldiers involved with American woman during Champagne Offensive in southern France, Summer 1944
1958	United States	The Naked and the Dead		Raoul Walsh	US troops fighting in the Pacific War
1958	Poland	Orzeł (The Eagle)	Orzeł	Leonard Buczkowski	Polish submarine ORP Orzeł and Orzeł incident, Baltic Sea escape attempt from neutral Estonian internment and German navy
1958	Poland	Pills for Aurelia	Pigułki dla Aurelii	Stanisław Lenartowicz	Polish resistance rescue of comrades from the Germans
1958	United States	Run Silent, Run Deep		Robert Wise	US submarine and Japanese destroyer chase in South West Pacific Theatre
1958	United Kingdom	Sea of Sand (Desert Patrol)		Guy Green	Long Range Desert Group in North African campaign
1958	United Kingdom	The Silent Enemy		William Fairchild	Fictionalised events in Gibraltar harbour during the Italian frogman and manned torpedo attacks
1958	Italy; Spain	The Sky Is Burning ^{†}	Il cielo brucia	Giuseppe Masini	Italian bombers in the North African campaign
1958	United States	South Pacific		Joshua Logan	Musical romance. South West Pacific Theater
1958	Denmark	Spy 503 ^{†·}	Spion 503	Jørn Jeppesen	Drama. German Agent 503 June Harvey with Swedish diplomats and Danish Resistance
1958	Poland	Story of One Fighter	Historia jednego myśliwca	Hubert Drapella	Polish fighter pilot serving with the RAF during the Battle of Britain, 1940
1958	United States	Submarine Seahawk (Submarine X2)		Spencer Gordon Bennet	Suspense drama. Submarine on reconnaissance mission in South West Pacific Theatre
1958	United States	Suicide Battalion		Edward L. Cahn	Drama. Soldiers sent to destroy base and strategic documents in occupied Philippines; remade as 1968 film Hell Raiders
1958	United States	Tarawa Beachhead		Paul Wendkos	Drama. Guadalcanal campaign and Battle of Tarawa.
1958	United States	A Time to Love and a Time to Die		Douglas Sirk	Romance drama based on Erich Maria Remarque novel. German soldier on furlough finds home town in chaos
1958	United States	Torpedo Run		Joseph Pevney	Drama. Submarine sets out to destroy Japanese carrier from Pearl Harbor attack now using US civilians and POWs as human shields
1958	West Germany	U 47 – Lieutenant Commander Prien	U 47 – Kapitänleutnant Prien	Harald Reinl	Günther Prien and the U-47
1958	United Kingdom	The Wind Cannot Read		Ralph Thomas	Romance between a British officer and his female language instructor in Burma
1958	United States	When Hell Broke Loose		Kenneth G. Crane	Action-drama. Foul-up GI redeems himself during Operation Greif in the Battle of the Bulge
1958	United States	The Young Lions		Edward Dmytryk	Action-drama. Three soldiers during war: one German, two American (one Jewish)
1959	United States	The Angry Hills		Robert Aldrich	Drama based on Leon Uris novel. Greek resistance
1959	Poland	Answer to Violence (Partisan Mission)	Zamach	Jerzy Passendorfer	Operation Kutschera and Polish resistance, 1944
1959	West Germany	As Far as My Feet Will Carry Me (TV miniseries)	So weit die Füße tragen	Fritz Umgelter	Drama based on POW Cornell Rost. Eastern Front, then escape from Siberian Gulag and journey home; remade as 2001 film As Far as My Feet Will Carry Me
1959	Soviet Union	Ballad of a Soldier	Баллада о солдате	Grigori Chukhrai	Poetic drama. Soldier receives home leave as reward for heroism
1959	United States	Battle of the Coral Sea		Paul Wendkos	Action-drama. Submarine on reconnaissance photographing Japanese installations through periscope
1959	West Germany	The Bridge	Die Brücke	Bernhard Wicki	Boys conscripted into Wehrmacht service on Western Front, 1945
1959	West Germany	Court Martial	Kriegsgericht	Kurt Meisel	Drama based on Will Berthold article. Kriegsmarine sailors tried for abandoning ship
1959	United Kingdom	Danger Within (Breakout)		Don Chaffey	Allied escape from POW camp in Northern Italy, Summer 1943
1959	United Kingdom	Desert Mice		Michael Relph	ENSA unit in the Western Desert campaign
1959	Soviet Union	Destiny of a Man	Sudba Cheloveka (Судьба человека)	Sergei Bondarchuk	Drama based on Mikhail Sholokhov story. POWs in German Stalag
1959	United States	The Diary of Anne Frank		George Stevens	Drama. Anne Frank hiding from Germans in occupied Amsterdam
1959	Japan	Fires on the Plain	Nobi (野火)	Kon Ichikawa	Decimated Japanese Imperial Army in Philippines, 1945
1959	Italy	General Della Rovere	Il generale Della Rovere	Roberto Rossellini	Drama based on Indro Montanelli novel. Petty thief hired by Nazis to impersonate Italian resistance leader
1959	France; Japan	Hiroshima Mon Amour (Hiroshima, My Love)	Hiroshima mon amour (in French); Nijuuyojikan no jouji (in Japanese)	Alain Resnais	Drama. Hiroshima bomb; remade as 2001 film H Story
1959	Japan	The Human Condition: No Greater Love	Ningen no jōken I (人間の條件)	Masaki Kobayashi	Manchukuo and Japanese Resistance in China; part one of trilogy
1959	Japan	The Human Condition: Road to Eternity	Ningen no jōken II (人間の條件)	Masaki Kobayashi	Imperial Japanese Army basic training; part two of trilogy
1959	United States	Never So Few		John Sturges	US troops join local guerrillas to fight the Japanese during the Burma campaign
1959	United Kingdom	The Night We Dropped a Clanger 9Make Mine a Double0		Darcy Conyers	Comedy. A British secret agent's mission in occupied France turns into a farcical tale of mistaken identity
1959	Poland	Octopus Cafe	Cafe Pod Minogą	Bronisław Brok	Comedy about wartime Polish resistance
1959	United Kingdom	Operation Amsterdam		Michael McCarthy	British commandos on mission to occupied Holland find fortune in Nazi diamonds
1959	United Kingdom	Operation Bullshine		Gilbert Gunn	Female crewed anti-aircraft units in England
1959	United States	Operation Petticoat		Blake Edwards	Comedy. Submarine commander stuck with decrepit pink sub, con-man executive officer and group of Army nurses
1959	United States	Paratroop Command		William Witney	US Army paratroopers in North Africa, Sicily, and Italy
1959	Poland	Speed	Lotna	Andrzej Wajda	Polish Cavalry and Invasion of Poland, 1939
1959	United Kingdom	The Square Peg		John Paddy Carstairs	Comedy. British council workmen drafted into service in France and mistaken for spies by Nazis
1959	West Germany	Stalingrad: Dogs, Do You Want to Live Forever? (Battle Inferno)	Hunde, wollt ihr ewig leben	Frank Wisbar	Drama. Romanian Army component of German 6th Army and Battle of Stalingrad
1959	East Germany; Bulgaria	Stars	Sterne (in German)	Konrad Wolf	
1959	Poland	The Stone Sky	Kamienne niebo	Czesław Petelski, Ewa Petelska	Civilians sheltering underground during the Warsaw Uprising, 1944
1959	United States	Tank Commandos		Burt Topper	Drama. US demolition unit on reconnaissance mission to determine where Germans ford river
1959	United Kingdom; West Germany	Ten Seconds to Hell (The Phoenix)		Robert Aldrich	Thriller based on Lawrence P. Bachmann novel. German bomb disposal squad in post-war Berlin
1959	United States	Timbuktu		Jacques Tourneur	Tuareg revolt in French West Africa, 1940
1959	United States	Up Periscope		Gordon Douglas	Action-drama. US Navy frogman aboard submarine on reconnaissance mission to Japanese-held island
1959	Poland	White Bear	Biały niedźwiedź	Jerzy Zarzycki	Tatra Mountains and Zakopane, Polish Holocaust, 1941
1959	Italy; France	Wolves of the Deep	Lupi nell'abisso (in Italian); Les loups dans l'abîme(in French)	Silvio Amadio	Sailors trapped in an Italian submarine damaged by depth charges

== 1960s ==
=== 1960–1964 ===
Year	Country	Main title (Alternative titles)	Original title (Original script)	Director	Battles, campaigns, events depicted
1960	East Germany	Blind Spot (TV)	Toter Winkel	Wolfgang Luderer	Drama. German farm girl at odds with forced-labor camp guard guilty of war crimes on verge of Soviet occupation, 1945
1960	Italy	The Cuirassier ^{†}	Il corazziere	Camillo Mastrocinque	Comedy. The misadventures of a short Italian soldier
1960	Italy; France	Escape by Night	Era notte a Roma (in Italian); Les Évadés de la nuit (in French)	Roberto Rossellini	Escaped Allied POWs in pre-liberated Italy
1960	Italy; France	Everybody Go Home	Tutti a casa (in Italian); La Grande Pagaille (in French)	Luigi Comencini	Comedy-drama (commedia all'italiana). The Four days of Naples and double occupation and subsequent chaos
1960	United States	The Gallant Hours		Robert Montgomery	Docudrama. Biopic of Admiral William F. "Bull" Halsey. Efforts against Admiral Isoroku Yamamoto and Imperial Japanese forces in Guadalcanal campaign
1960	United States	Hell to Eternity		Phil Karlson	Battle of Saipan and wartime discrimination against Japanese-Americans
1960	Italy	It Happened in '43	La lunga notte del '43	Florestano Vancini	Allied invasion of Italy
1960	Italy	The Hunchback of Rome	Il gobbo	Carlo Lizzani	Italian partisan under German occupation becomes a gangster after the liberation of Rome
1960	Denmark	The Last Winter	Den sidste vinter	Edvin Tiemroth, Anker Sørensen	Resistance group on Denmark's Lolland island attempts to liberate wounded British officer, Winter 1944–45
1960	United Kingdom	Light Up the Sky!		Lewis Gilbert	Anti-aircraft units in England
1960	United States	The Mountain Road		Daniel Mann	Drama based on Theodore White novel. China based US Army demolition officer's attempts to destroy bridges and roads useful to Imperial Japanese Army
1960	Denmark	Price of Freedom	Frihedens Pris	Annelise Hovmand	
1960	Romania	The Secret Code	Secretul cifrului	Lucian Bratu	Retreat of Nazi forces from Romania in 1944
1960	United Kingdom	Sink the Bismarck!		Lewis Gilbert	Operation Rheinübung and Battle of the Atlantic
1960	United States	Ski Troop Attack		Roger Corman	Action. US ski-troop commandos behind German lines to destroy rail bridge
1960	Czechoslovakia	Slingshot Bearer	Práče	Karel Kachyňa	Story of Czechoslovak children participating in homeland liberation after Czechoslovak army rescue from concentration camps on Eastern Front
1960	Japan	Storm Over the Pacific (I Bombed Pearl Harbor)	Hawai Middouei daikaikusen: Taiheiyo no arashi (ハワイ・ミッドウェイ大海空戦 太平洋の嵐)	Shuei Matsubayashi	Imperial Japanese Navy pilot serving on Japanese aircraft carrier Hiryū in battles of Pearl Harbor and Midway
1960	Italy	The Tank of 8 September ^{†}	Il carro armato dell'8 settembre	Gianni Puccini	Italian Armistice of 8 September 1943
1960	France	Taxi for Tobruk	Un taxi pour Tobrouk	Denys de La Patellière	Free French commandos in North Africa on mission to capture German officer and reach Allied lines
1960	Italy	Two Women	La ciociara	Vittorio De Sica	Drama. Italian mother and daughter raped by French Expeditionary Corps troops (Marocchinate)
1960	Italy; United States	Under Ten Flags		Duilio Coletti	The 665-day pursuit of German surface raider Atlantis and Battle of the Atlantic
1961	Denmark	Alarm in the Baltic ^{†}	Sorte Shara (Alarm i Østersøen, DVD)	Sven Methling	Baltic naval battle and escape to neutral Sweden
1961	United States	Battle at Bloody Beach		Herbert Coleman	Romance/Drama. Civilian US Navy contractor supplies Filipino guerrillas while searching for wife
1961	United Kingdom; Italy	The Best of Enemies	I due nemici (in Italian)	Guy Hamilton	Comedy. East African Campaign
1961	Poland	Birth Certificate	Świadectwo urodzenia	Stanisław Różewicz	Invasion of Poland, 1939
1961	United States; France	Bridge to the Sun	Pont vers le soleil	Étienne Périer	Romance-drama based on autobiography of Gwendolen Terasaki. Wife to First Secretary at Japanese Embassy in Washington when Pearl Harbor is bombed and later liaison between Palace and Supreme Allied Commander Douglas MacArthur
1961	Italy	A Day for Lionhearts	Un giorno da leoni	Nanni Loy	Italian armistice and the beginning of resistance in Italy
1961	Italy	Desert Furlough	Pastasciutta nel deserto	Carlo Ludovico Bragaglia	Comedy. Misadventures of an Italian soldier in the rear of the front at El Alamein
1961	Germany	Destination Death	Der Transport	Jürgen Roland, Herbert Viktor	Railway travel of German military convicts on their way to join a penal unit
1961	Italy	A Difficult Life	Una vita difficile	Dino Risi	Comedy-drama. Italian resistance movement and postwar readjustment
1961	Italy	The Fascist	Il federale	Luciano Salce	Comedy. Member of Fascist Brigate Nere and sojourn with captive anti-Fascist
1961	East Germany	The Gleiwitz Case	Der Fall Gleiwitz	Gerhard Klein	Gleiwitz incident, 1939
1961	United Kingdom	The Guns of Navarone		J. Lee Thompson	Action-adventure. Allied commandos on mission in Mediterranean Theatre
1961	Japan	The Human Condition: A Soldier's Prayer	Ningen no jōken III (人間の條件 III 人間の條件 完結篇)	Masaki Kobayashi	Part three of trilogy
1961	India	Hum Dono	Hum Dono	Amarjeet, Vijay Anand	Musical drama. Indian Army officer in Burma campaign longs for home but has one last duty to perform
1961	United Kingdom	Invasion Quartet		Jay Lewis	Comedy/drama set during the Battle of France
1961	United States	Judgment at Nuremberg		Stanley Kramer	Drama. The Nuremberg Trials
1961	United States	The Last Time I Saw Archie		Jack Webb	Comedy. Enlistment, training and commissioning of Civilian Air Corps into Army Air Force near end of war
1961	United Kingdom	The Middle Course		Montgomery Tully	Drama. Canadian pilot downed on mission aids French Resistance under German occupation of France
1961	Poland	Night Train	Ludzie z pociągu	Kazimierz Kutz	German occupation of Poland
1961	United States	On the Double		Melville Shavelson	Comedy. Allied soldier awaiting D-Day and impersonation of Allied general to foil assassination by German agents
1961	United States	Operation Bottleneck		Edward L. Cahn	US paratroopers in the Burma campaign
1961	West Germany	Ordered to Love	Lebensborn	Werner Klingler	Exploitation. Nazi Lebensborn programme
1961	United States	The Outsider		Delbert Mann	Drama based on life of Ira Hayes. Native American Marine who raised the flag on Iwo Jima
1961	Italy	Pigeon Shoot	Tiro al piccione	Giuliano Montaldo	Decima MAS of the Italian Social Republic
1961	East Germany	Professor Mamlock	Professor Mamlock	Konrad Wolf	Drama based on Friedrich Wolf play. Jewish doctor fails to resist the Nazis
1961	Poland	Samson	Samson	Andrzej Wajda	Holocaust during German occupation of Poland
1961	Poland	Spring	Kwiecień	Witold Lesiewicz	Wehrmacht on Eastern Front, 1945
1961	Hong Kong	Sun, Moon and Star	Xingxing yueliang taiyang (星星月亮太陽) (Mandarin)	Yi Wen	Drama. Chinese resistance
1961	United Kingdom	Tarnished Heroes		Ernest Morris	Action-adventure. British Major recruits military prisoners for a mission during the Battle of France.
1961	Poland	Tonight a City Will Die	Dziś w nocy umrze miasto	Jan Rybkowski	Bombing of Dresden from perspective of Polish forced labourers in city, 1945
1961	Italy	The Two Marshals	I due marescialli	Sergio Corbucci	Comedy. Carabinieri during the German occupation of Italy
1961	United Kingdom	Very Important Person		Ken Annakin	Comedy. British POWs in Stalag
1962	United States	The Counterfeit Traitor		George Seaton	Drama/Thriller based on Alexander Klein non-fiction novel. American-born Swedish oil-trader coerced by Allies into spying on Nazis
1962	Italy	Desert War	Quattro notti con l'alba	Luigi Filippo D'Amico	Four Italian soldiers and a woman during the retreat after the Second Battle of El Alamein
1962	France	The Elusive Corporal (The Vanishing Corporal)	Le caporal épinglé	Jean Renoir	Comedy-drama. Upper-class Parisian corporal captured by Germans in Battle of France and his various escape attempts from stalag, 1940
1962	Italy	The Four Days of Naples	Le quattro giornate di Napoli	Nanni Loy	Drama. Italian civilians revolt against German invaders in the Four Days of Naples
1962	United States	The Four Horsemen of the Apocalypse		Vincente Minnelli	Drama. German family, from Germany to Argentina and occupied France, between country, Nazism and anti-Nazism
1962	United States	Hell Is for Heroes		Don Siegel	Action-drama. Squad of US soldiers fighting off larger German forces on Western front
1962	Soviet Union	Ivan's Childhood	Ivanovo detstvo (Иваново детство)	Andrei Tarkovsky	Drama. Orphaned boy, cared for by Soviet officers, works as spy on Eastern Front, crossing German lines
1962	Yugoslavia	Kozara	Kozara	Veljko Bulajić	Yugoslav Partisans fight German forces in the Kozara Offensive
1962	Netherlands	Like Two Drops of Water (The Dark Room of Damocles / The Spitting Image)	Als twee druppels water	Fons Rademakers	Mystery drama based on Willem Frederik Hermans novel. Dutch Resistance
1962	United States	The Longest Day		Bernhard Wicki, Andrew Marton and Ken Annakin	Action-drama about the Allied Normandy landings on D-Day
1962	United States; Philippines	Lost Battalion		Eddie Romero	Action-drama. Filipino guerilla leader with knowledge of island jungle attempts rescue of American refugees pinned by Japanese in Philippines
1962	United States	Merrill's Marauders		Samuel Fuller	US Special Ops troops, the Merrill's Marauders fighting behind Japanese lines
1962	United States	No Man is an Island (Island Escape)		Richard Goldstone, John Monks Jr.	Drama based on George Tweed. US sailor is only serviceman on Guam to avoid capture by Japanese
1962	Italy; France	No Man's Land	Un branco di vigliacchi	Fabrizio Taglioni	German violence shortly before the arrival of the Allies in occupied Italy
1962	United Kingdom	Operation Snatch		Robert Day	Comedy. Officer responsible for Barbary apes on Gibraltar behind German lines to snatch an ape to prevent British departure from Gibraltar
1962	United Kingdom	The Silent Invasion		Max Varnel	Drama. French Resistance story.
1962	Netherlands	The Silent Raid	De Overval	Paul Rotha	Crime-thriller based on true story. Allied POW and Dutch Resistance escape from Leeuwarden prison, 1944
1962	East Germany	Star-Crossed Lovers (Invincible Love)	Königskinder	Frank Beyer	Romantic Drama set in Eastern Germany pre-war and wartime.
1962	Greece	Stick Them Up, Hitler	Psila ta heria Hitler (Ψηλά τα Χέρια Χίτλερ)	Roviros Manthoulis	Comedy-drama. Greek Resistance
1962	Philippines	Suicide Commandoes		Armando Garces	Six Filipino guerrillas aid Lieutenant in destroying Japanese airfield during Battle of Bessang Pass
1962	Italy	Ten Italians for One German	Dieci italiani per un tedesco	Filippo Walter Ratti	Italian resistance in Rome and Ardeatine massacre
1962	Italy	The Two Colonels	I due colonnelli	Steno	Comedy. An Italian and a British colonel in Greece
1962	Italy; United Kingdom	The Valiant	L'affondamento della Valiant	Roy Ward Baker	Italian navy divers attack Royal Navy ships in the Raid on Alexandria (1941)
1962	Denmark	Venus fra Vestø	Venus fra Vestø	Annelise Reenberg	Comedy based on true story. Prized cow on Danish island in danger of being seized by German occupation forces or British agricultural department
1962	Poland	Walther P-38 (TV)	Pistolet typu Walter P-38	Edward Etler	Polish resistance
1962	United Kingdom	The War Lover		Philip Leacock	American bomber crews in England
1962	Japan	The Pacific War and Himeyuri Corps	太平洋戦争と姫ゆり部隊 (Taiheiyô Sensô to Himeyuri Butai)	Kiyoshi Komori	Himeyuri students in Battle of Okinawa
1963	Finland	Commando Assault	Sissit	Mikko Niskanen	Guerrilla warfare during Continuation War
1963	United States; Philippines	Cry of Battle		Irving Lerner	Mercenary fighting with partisans in Philippines during Japanese occupation of the Philippines
1963	United States	The Great Escape		John Sturges	Allied POWs mount mass escape from Stalag Luft III
1963	Italy	The Hand on the Rifle ^{†}	La mano sul fucile	Luigi Turolla	Soldiers of the Italian Social Republic against Italian partisans
1963	Poland	Manhunter	Naganiacz	Czesław Petelski, Ewa Petelska	Holocaust in Poland
1963	United Kingdom	Mystery Submarine (Decoy)		C.M. Pennington-Richards	Adventure-drama. Captured U-boat on Royal Navy mission to mislead German naval force
1963	East Germany	Naked Among Wolves	Nackt unter Wölfen	Frank Beyer	Drama based on Bruno Apitz novel. Child hidden in Buchenwald until camp's liberation
1963	Poland	On the White Trails	Na białym szlaku	Jarosław Brzozowski	Nazi and Polish forces in Arctic at end of war
1963	United States	Operation Bikini		Anthony Carras	Underwater Demolition Team aboard a submarine in the Pacific.
1963	Poland	Passenger	Pasażerka	Andrzej Munk	Female SS officer at Auschwitz-Birkenau and her relationship with inmate
1963	United Kingdom	The Password is Courage		Andrew Stone	Comedy-drama based on POW Sgt. Maj. Charles Coward. Captured soldier's attempts to escape Germans
1963	Philippines	Pinakamagandang hayop sa daigdig	Pinakamagandang hayop sa daigdig	Pablo Santiago	Heroic Filipina during Japanese occupation of the Philippines
1963	United States	Miracle of the White Stallions		Arthur Hiller	In 1945 the fate of Vienna's famous Lipizzaner stallions hangs into balance. American general Patton could save them but first he asks to see them perform.
1963	United States	PT 109		Leslie H. Martinson	John F. Kennedy's USN service on Pacific Front
1963	United States	The Quick and the Dead		Robert Totten	Action-drama. Isolated US soldiers aided by partisans during Italian Campaign, 1944
1963	Yugoslavia	The Raid on Drvar	Desant na Drvar	Fadil Hadžić	Operation Rösselsprung (1944) German operation to capture or kill the Yugoslav Partisan leader Marshal Tito
1963	Philippines; United States	The Raiders of Leyte Gulf		Eddie Romero	Plan to rescue captured American intelligence agent from the Japanese prior to the Battle of Leyte
1963	Philippines	Sierra Madre		Armando A. Herrera	Campaigns of demolition men during Japanese Occupation of the Philippines
1963	Philippines	Sigaw ng Digmaan	Sigaw ng Digmaan	Efren Reyes, Sr.	Philippine Army resistance, 1941
1963	Italy	The Terrorist	Il terrorista	Gianfranco De Bosio	Italian partisans in Venice
1963	Italy; United States	Torpedo Bay	Finché dura la tempesta	Charles Frend	Italian submarine is chased by the British as it tries to pass through the Strait of Gibraltar
1963	Hungary	Two Half Times in Hell (The Last Goal)	Két félidő a pokolban	Zoltán Fábri	Drama. Soccer match between POWs and Germans
1963	Italy	The Verona Trial	Il processo di Verona	Carlo Lizzani	Verona trial of prominent Italian Fascist leaders after the countries' liberation
1963	United Kingdom	The Victors		Carl Foreman	Drama. US soldiers in European Theatre of combat following D-Day
1963	Poland	Where is the General?	Gdzie jest generał...	Tadeusz Chmielewski	Comedy. Polish forces on Eastern Front, 1945
1963	Italy	Wine, Whiskey and Salt Water	Vino, whisky e acqua salata	Mario Amendola	Comedy. An Italian submarine sinks an English warship and takes its very British commander as prisoner
1964	Soviet Union	The Alive and the Dead	Живые и мёртвые	Aleksandr Stolper	Military journalism in the country during the period of counterattacks in Battle of Moscow
1964	United States	The Americanization of Emily		Arthur Hiller	US Navy planning for Normandy landings to have the first casualty by a US Navy man.
1964	Czechoslovakia	The Assassination	Atentát	Jiří Sequens	Operation Anthropoid, the assassination of high-ranking Nazi Reinhard Heydrich in Prague
1964	Italy; Soviet Union	Attack and Retreat	Italiani brava gente (in Italian); Oni shli na vostok (Они шли на Восток) (in Russian)	Giuseppe De Santis	Drama. Unheralded and unsuccessful Eastern Front invasion of Soviet Union by Italian army
1964	United States	Back Door to Hell		Monte Hellman	American commandos prepare for Gen. MacArthur's return to Philippines
1964	Poland	Battle Colours	Barwy walki	Jerzy Passendorfer	Polish resistance, 1944
1964	China	Dr. Bethune	Bái Qiúēn dai fu (白求恩大夫)	Gao Zheng, Li Shutian	Drama based on Zhou Erfu book. Canadian doctor Norman Bethune dies aiding Red Army in Sino-Japanese War
1964	Poland	End of our World	Koniec naszego świata	Wanda Jakubowska	Prison camp survivor recalls his time in Auschwitz
1964	United States	Ensign Pulver		Joshua Logan	Romantic comedy. South West Pacific Theatre; sequel to 1955 film Mister Roberts
1964	United States	Father Goose		Ralph Nelson	Comedy-drama. Coast watcher on Matalava island monitoring Japanese plane movements in the South Pacific
1964	Soviet Union (Georgian SSR)	The Father of the Soldier	Jariskatsis mama (ჯარისკაცის მამა) (in Georgian); Otets soldata (Отец солдата) (in Russian)	Rezo Chkheidze (Revaz Tchkheidze)	Drama. Georgian peasant leaving village for front lines to find wounded soldier son
1964	Poland	The First Day of Freedom	Pierwszy dzień wolności	Aleksander Ford	Polish POWs in German Stalag, 1945
1964	Japan; United States	Flight from Ashiya		Michael Anderson	USAAF pilots relive events in North Africa and Pacific
1964	Poland	Giuseppe in Warsaw	Giuseppe w Warszawie	Stanisław Lenartowicz	Comedy. Italian soldier in Poland, 1943
1964	United States	McHale's Navy		Edward Montagne	Comedy. American PT boat crew in Pacific Ocean theater of World War II and New Caledonia
1964	Philippines	The Guns of Corregidor ^{†}	Mga Kanyon ng Corregidor	Jose de Villa, Mar S. Torres	Allied forces retake Philippine island from Japanese in the Battle of Corregidor
1964	Yugoslavia	Nikoletina Bursać	Nikoletina Bursać	Branko Bauer	Story of Yugoslav partisan Nikoletina Bursać
1964	Denmark	Paradise and Back	Paradis Retur	Gabriel Axel	Romance/Drama. Life near imposing landfill amid pre-War Denmark and Danish Resistance under German occupation of Denmark, 1928–1945
1964	United States	The Pawnbroker		Sidney Lumet	Drama. New York City Auschwitz survivor tormented by memories
1964	United States	The Secret Invasion		Roger Corman	Allied convicts recruited for mission to capture Nazi-imprisoned Italian general planning to switch sides and turnover army to Allies
1964	United Kingdom	The Secret of Blood Island		Quentin Lawrence	British POWs help wounded female agent escape Japanese; loosely based sequel to 1958 film The Camp on Blood Island
1964	South Africa	Seven Against the Sun		David Millin	Squad of South African troops behind enemy lines cause Italian chaos with fake broadcasts in East African Campaign
1964	United States	Shell Shock		John Hayes	US troops during the Italian Campaign
1964	United Kingdom	633 Squadron (Squadron 633)		Walter Grauman	Drama. RAF squadron on mission to destroy German V-2 rocket fuel factory in Occupied Norway
1964	United States	The Thin Red Line		Andrew Marton	US troops fighting during the Guadalcanal campaign
1964	United States; France; Italy	The Train		John Frankenheimer	Resistance in Occupied France
1964	Poland	The Unknown	Nieznany	Witold Lesiewicz	Soviet Gulag and Eastern Front, 1943–44
1964	Philippines; United States	The Walls of Hell	Intramuros	Eddie Romero, Gerardo de León	Battle of Intramuros to liberate Manila from the Japanese
1964	France	Weekend at Dunkirk	Week-end à Zuydcoote	Henri Verneuil	French troops fight against German forces at the Battle of Dunkirk
1964	Poland	Wounded in the Forest	Ranny w lesie	Janusz Nasfeter	Polish troops try to evade capture by the Germans
1964	United Kingdom	The Yellow Rolls-Royce		Anthony Asquith	Axis invasion of Yugoslavia

=== 1965–1969 ===
Year	Country	Main title (Alternative titles)	Original title (Original script)	Director	Battles, campaigns, events depicted
1965	Poland	And All Will Be Quiet	Potem nastąpi cisza	Janusz Morgenstern	Polish resistance, 1944
1965	United States	Battle of the Bulge		Ken Annakin	Ardennes Offensive in 1944
1965	Poland	The Boots (TV)	Buty	Czesław Petelski, Ewa Petelska	Eastern Front military hospital
1965	Italy	The Camp Followers	Le soldatesse	Valerio Zurlini	Italian soldiers escort a group of prostitutes in occupied Greece
1965	Poland	The Cart (TV)	Wózek	Czesław Petelski, Ewa Petelska	Soviet POWs in Poland
1965	Hungary	The Corporal and Others	A tizedes meg a többiek	Márton Keleti	Comedy. Hungarian soldiers attempt to surrender to Soviet army
1965	Poland	The Day after the War (TV)	Nazajutrz po wojnie	Lech Lorentowicz	Eastern Front, 1945
1965	Poland	Death in the Middle Room (TV)	Śmierć w środkowym pokoju	Andrzej Trzos-Rastawiecki	German occupation of Poland
1965	Philippines	The Ferdinand E. Marcos Story	Iginuhit ng Tadhana	Mar S. Torres, Jose de Villa, Conrado Conde	Biography of Ferdinand Marcos during Japanese Occupation of the Philippines
1965	Czechoslovakia	The Fifth Horseman is Fear (...and the Fifth Horseman Is Fear)	A pátý jezdec je strach	Zbyněk Brynych	Drama. Mental effects of Holocaust and oppression in Prague under Nazi occupation
1965	United Kingdom	The Heroes of Telemark		Anthony Mann	Norwegian resistance movement and Operation Gunnerside
1965	United Kingdom	The Hill		Sidney Lumet	British military prison during the North African campaign
1965	United States	In Harm's Way		Otto Preminger	US Navy officers in the Pacific Theater of Operations
1965	United States	King Rat		Otto Preminger	Based on James Clavell novel. Allied POWs under Japanese captors
1965	Poland	The Little Daughter (TV)	Córeczka	Czesław Petelski, Ewa Petelska	Poland, 1944
1965	United States	McHale's Navy Joins the Air Force		Edward Montagne	American PT boat crew in Pacific Theatre; sequel to 1964 film McHale's Navy
1965	Poland; France; West Germany	The Moment of Peace (TV)	Czas pokoju (in Polish)	Georges Franju, Tadeusz Konwicki, Egon Monk, Wojciech Solarz	Anthology. Occupation stories in France, Germany, and Poland
1965	United States	Morituri (Saboteur: Code Name Morituri)		Bernhard Wicki	German in India blackmailed by British to impersonate SS officer aboard cargo ship bound for Germany
1965	United States; Japan	None but the Brave		Frank Sinatra	US and Japanese soldiers temporarily unite to survive on isolated Pacific Island
1965	United Kingdom	Operation Crossbow (The Great Spy Mission)		Michael Anderson	Operation Crossbow. Allied operations against the German V-Weapon programme
1965	Philippines	My Beloved Philippines ^{†}	Pilipinas kong mahal	Efren Reyes	Romance-Drama. Battle of Bataan, Makapili, and Guerrilla movement in the Philippines during the Japanese occupation of the Philippines
1965	Hungary	My Way Home	Így jöttem	Miklós Jancsó	Drama.
1965	Philippines; United States	The Ravagers		Eddie Romero	Filipino guerrillas battle remaining Japanese forces
1965	Philippines	Sa Bawat Hakbang...Panganib	Sa Bawat Hakbang...Panganib	Armando A. Herrera	Filipino guerrillas rescue US soldiers with information for resistance movement
1965	Czechoslovakia	The Shop on Main Street	Obchod na korze	Ján Kadár, Elmar Klos	Drama. Aryanization of rump Slovak State
1965	United States	Situation Hopeless... But Not Serious		Gottfried Reinhardt	Comedy based on Robert Shaw novel about captured US airmen in Germany
1965	United Kingdom	The Sound of Music		Robert Wise	1965 Best Picture Musical drama. Von Trapp family in Salzburg during Nazi Anschluss
1965	Japan	Story of a Prostitute	Shunpuden (春婦伝)	Seijun Suzuki	Brothel at a Japanese outpost in Manchukuo
1965	United States	36 Hours		George Seaton	Thriller based on Roald Dahl story. Early June 1944, Germans deceive American officer that it is 1950 and war is over
1965	Yugoslavia	Three	Tri	Aleksandar Petrović	Partisan warfare in Yugoslavia
1965	China	Tunnel War	Dì dào zhàn (地道战)	Ren Xudong	Tunnel warfare in China during Sino-Japanese War
1965	United States; France	Up from the Beach		Robert Parrish	US patrol and their German prisoner after D-Day
1965	United States	Von Ryan's Express		Mark Robson	Allied POWs escape from Italian camps by train
1965	Italy	War Italian Style		Luigi Scattini	Two incompetent US Marines are sent to the Battle of Anzio
1966	United States	Ambush Bay		Ron Winston	US Marine amphibious scouts prior to 1944 invasion of the Philippines
1966	Czechoslovakia	Closely Watched Trains (Closely Observed Trains)	Ostře sledované vlaky	Jiří Menzel	Unlikely hero takes stand against German occupation of Czechoslovakia
1966	Poland	Contribution	Kontrybucja	Jan Łomnicki	Polish resistance
1966	Poland	Don Gabriel	Don Gabriel	Ewa Petelska, Czesław Petelski	Comedy. Polish Campaign, 1939
1966	Hungary	Cold Days	Hideg Napok	András Kovács	Drama. Novi Sad raid, 1942. Based on the novel by Tibor Cseres.
1966	France	Don't Look Now... We're Being Shot At!	La Grande Vadrouille	Gérard Oury	Comedy. RAF crew attempt escape through occupied France aided by two Frenchmen
1966	Yugoslavia	Eagles Fly Early	Orlovi rano lete	Soja Jovanović	Young boys assist the partisans in fighting the Germans invading Yugoslavia
1966	United States	I Deal In Danger		Walter Grauman	American correspondent and double agent for neutral US against Nazis; feature-length compilation of short-lived TV series Blue Light
1966	Soviet Union (Latvian SSR)	I remember everything, Richard (cut version) (Rocks and Splinters; uncut version)	Es visu atceros, Ricard! (cut version) (Akmens un šķembas; uncut version)	Rolands Kalnins	Latvian Legion on Leningrad Front; AKA Dzimtene, piedod
1966	United States; France	Is Paris Burning?	Paris brûle-t-il?	René Clément	Liberation of Paris
1966	Israel; United Kingdom; United States	Judith (Conflict)		Daniel Mann	Woman betrayed by Nazi husband is interned in Dachau concentration camp and seeks revenge
1966	France	Line of Demarcation	La ligne de démarcation	Claude Chabrol	Small French town divided by river that forms border between Nazi-occupied France and unoccupied zone, 1941
1966	Poland	The Master (TV)	Mistrz	Jerzy Antczak	German occupation of Poland
1966	United States	Mission to Death		Kenneth W. Richardson	US commandos infiltrate German lines in northern France, 1945
1966	United Kingdom; France	The Night of the Generals		Anatole Litvak	July 20 plot to assassinate Hitler
1966	Denmark	Once There Was a War	Der var engang en krig	Palle Kjærulff-Schmidt	Danish boy after German occupation of Denmark
1966	Japan	Red Angel	Akai tenshi (赤い天使)	Yasuzo Masumura	Romance/Drama. Japanese nurse serves in field hospitals of China
1966	United States	What Did You Do in the War, Daddy?		Blake Edwards	Allied invasion of Sicily
1967	United Kingdom	Attack on the Iron Coast		Paul Wendkos	Canadian commando raid on Nazi-held French port, loosely based on St. Nazaire Raid
1967	East Germany	The Banner of Krivoy Rog	Die Fahne von Kriwoj Rog	Kurt Maetzig	Liberation of Ukrainian city of Krivoy Rog
1967	United States	Beach Red		Cornel Wilde	US Marines land on occupied island during the Pacific Theater of Operations
1967	Yugoslavia	Black Birds	Crne ptice (Црне птице)	Eduard Galić	POWs in Ustasha-run concentration camp near end of war
1967	Italy; France	The Crazy Kids of the War	La feldmarescialla	Steno	Comedy. A downed American aviator, a meteorologist and a girl flee the Germans in occupied Italy
1967	Poland	A Crazy Night	Zwariowana noc	Zbigniew Kuźmiński	Comedy. Polish resistance
1967	Yugoslavia	Demolition Squad	Diverzanti	Hajrudin Krvavac	Partisan commandos attack a German air base in Yugoslavia
1967	Italy; France; West Germany	Desert Commandos	Attentato ai tre grandi (in Italian); Les chiens verts du désert (in French); Fünf gegen Casablanca (in German)	Umberto Lenzi	German commandos parachute into North Africa to infiltrate Casablanca Conference
1967	French	The 25th Hour	La vingt-cinquième heure	Henri Verneuil	In World War II, a Romanian gentile peasant is denounced by the village gendarme and sent to a concentration camp for Jews where, due to an error, he's drafted into the S.S.
1967	United States	The Dirty Dozen		Robert Aldrich	Thriller based on E. M. Nathanson novel. US Army convicts on mission before D-Day
1967	Italy	Dirty Heroes	Dalle Ardenne all'inferno	Alberto De Martino	Drama, action.
1967	United States	First to Fight		Christian Nyby	US Marines in the Pacific Theater of Operations
1967	Japan	Japan's Longest Day	Nihon no ichiban nagai hi (日本のいちばん長い日)	Kihachi Okamoto	Drama based on Sōichi Ōya book. Kyūjō Incident
1967	Poland	The Killer Leaves a Trace	Morderca zostawia ślad	Aleksander Ścibor-Rylski	Polish resistance
1967	United States	The Longest Hundred Miles (Escape from Bataan)		Don Weis	Adventure. US corporal, priest, and Filipino children flee the Japanese
1967	Poland	Long Night	Długa noc	Janusz Nasfeter	Polish resistance during German occupation of Poland, 1943
1967	Poland; West Germany	Rassenschande: When Love Was a Crime	Kiedy miłość była zbrodnią	Jan Rybkowski	German homefront
1967	Hungary	Three Nights of Love	Egy szerelem három éjszakája	György Révész	Drama, musical.
1967	United States	Tobruk		Arthur Hiller	Canadian officer guides British and German-Jewish commandos to destroy Tobruk fuel storage, September 1942
1967	France	The Two of Us	Le vieil homme et l'enfant (Claude)	Claude Berri	Comedy-drama. Jewish boy sent to live on farm during German occupation of France
1967	Poland	Westerplatte	Westerplatte	Stanisław Różewicz	Battle of Westerplatte, the start of the 1939 German invasion of Poland
1967	Soviet Union; Poland	Zosya	Zosya (Зося) (in Russian); Zosia (in Polish)	Jerzy Lipman	Romance/Drama. Soviet officer and Polish girl near end of war on Poland's Eastern Front
1968	Albania	Ambush	Prita	Mithat Fagu	Albanian Resistance under German occupation of Albania, 1943
1968	Philippines	Ang Mangliligpit	Ang Mangliligpit	Pablo Santiago	Filipino Guerrillas battle Makapili
1968	Italy	Anzio		Edward Dmytryk, Duilio Coletti	Allied seaborne assault at the Battle of Anzio
1968	Soviet Union (Georgian SSR)	Crucified Island	Jvartsmuli kundzuli (ჯვარცმული კუნძული) (in Georgian); Raspyaty ostrov (Распятый остров) (in Russian)	Shota Managadze	Based on true story of Georgian uprising on Texel. Insurrection of captured Soviet-Georgian soldiers conscripted into German Wehrmacht on Holland's Texel Island during German occupation of Holland
1968	Italy; West Germany	Commandos (Sullivan's Marauders)	Commandos (in Italian)	Armando Crispino	Italian-American soldiers disguised in Italian uniform infiltrate North African camp
1968	United States	The Devil's Brigade		Andrew V. McLaglen	Story of US-Canadian Commando force, the Devil's Brigade
1968	Czechoslovakia	Dita Saxová	Dita Saxová	Antonín Moskalyk	Concentration camp survivor in postwar Prague. Based on novel by Arnošt Lustig.
1968	France	Franciscan of Bourges	Le franciscain de Bourges	Claude Autant-Lara	German priest supports prisoners in occupied France
1968	Poland	Heading for Berlin	Kierunek Berlin	Jerzy Passendorfer	Polish troops taking part in the battle for Berlin during 1945
1968	Italy; France	Hell in Normandy	Testa di sbarco per otto implacabili (in Italian)	Alfonso Brescia	US paratrooper commandos at Omaha Beach prior to D-Day
1968	United States	Hell in the Pacific		John Boorman	Downed US Marine pilot and marooned Japanese Navy captain on deserted Pacific island
1968	United States	Hell Raiders (TV)		Larry Buchanan	US Army demolition squad on mission to destroy records in evacuated headquarters as German forces advance in Italy; remake of 1958 film Suicide Battalion
1968	United States	The Hell with Heroes		Joseph Sargent	Former USAAF pilots forced to work for international smuggler in North Africa to earn money needed for return to civilian life, 1946
1968	Japan	The Human Bullet (Human Guinea Pigs: The Human Bullet)	Nikudan (肉弾)	Kihachi Okamoto	Japanese Navy pilot assigned kamikaze mission against US battleship
1968	United States	In Enemy Country (In Enemy Hands)		Harry Keller	Allied undercover agents aided by Polish resistance on mission to stop Nazis from developing "super torpedo"
1968	East Germany	I Was Nineteen	Ich war neunzehn (Ich war 19 / Heimkehr)	Konrad Wolf	Drama based on director's diary. Young German's flight from Nazis to Moscow and return to Berlin as Russian Army officer
1968	United Kingdom	The Long Day's Dying		Peter Collinson	British paratroopers separated from regiment take German officer prisoner
1968	Philippines	Manila, Open City	Manila, Open City	Eddie Romero	Manila Massacre and Battle of Manila
1968	Philippines	Mission Batangas		Keith Larsen	Battle of the Philippines
1968	Yugoslavia	Operation Belgrade	Operacija Beograd	Žika Mitrović	A group of partisans is sent to Belgrade to rescue a captured American colonel
1968	Soviet Union (Estonian SSR)	People in Soldier's Uniforms	Inimesed sõdurisinelis (in Estonian); Lyudi v soldatskikh shinelyakh (Люди в солдатских шинелях) (in Russian)	Jüri Müür	Mobilized Estonian conscripts in Red Army at battles of Velikiye Luki and Tehumardi
1968	Czechoslovakia	Riders in the Sky (Sky Riders / Heaven Riders)	Nebeští jezdci	Jindřich Polák	Czech pilots in RAF No. 311 Squadron
1968	United States	The Secret War of Harry Frigg		Jack Smight	Comedy. Escape of Allied Generals held in special Italian camp
1968	Italy	The Seven Cervi Brothers	I sette fratelli Cervi	Gianni Puccini	Anti Fascist resistance fighters the Cervi Brothers
1968	Soviet Union	The Shield and the Sword	Shchit i mech (Щит и меч)	Vladimir Basov	Soviet spy in German intelligence
1968	West Germany	Signs of Life	Lebenszeichen	Werner Herzog	Wounded German soldiers assigned to convalesce on Greek island of Kos
1968	United States	The Subject was Roses		Ulu Grosbard	Soldier's return home after war
1968	United Kingdom	Submarine X-1		William A. Graham	Royal Navy midget submarines
1968	Italy/Spain	Suicide Commandos	Commando suicida	Camillo Bazzoni	British commando mission prior to D-Day
1968	United Kingdom	Where Eagles Dare		Brian G. Hutton	Allied commando operation to rescue captured "American General"
1968	Japan	Monument to the Girl's Corps Monument of Maidens Lily	Âh himeyuri no tô (あゝひめゆりの塔)	Toshio Masuda	Himeyuri students in Battle of Okinawa
1968	Philippines	Warkill		Ferde Grofé Jr.	US Colonel and Philippine guerillas hunt down Japanese in 1945
1969	France; Italy	Army of Shadows	L'Armée des ombres	Jean-Pierre Melville	French Resistance
1969	Poland	Ascension Day	Wniebowstąpienie	Jan Rybkowski	Lwów, Poland during Soviet and German Occupation, 1941
1969	Soviet Union	At War as at War	На войне как на войне	Viktor Tregubovich	Dnieper–Carpathian offensive, Battle of the Dnieper
1969	United Kingdom	Battle of Britain		Guy Hamilton	Battle of Britain
1969	Italy	The Battle of El Alamein	La battaglia di El Alamein	Giorgio Ferroni	Second Battle of El Alamein
1969	Yugoslavia	The Battle of Neretva	Bitka na Neretvi	Veljko Bulajić	Yugoslav partisan resistance at the Battle of Neretva
1969	Italy; Spain; West Germany; Switzerland	Battle of the Commandos	La legione dei dannati (in Italian); La brigada de los condenados (in Spanish); Die zum Teufel gehen (in German)	Umberto Lenzi	Irish Colonel leading commando unit of convicts and US explosives expert on mission to defuse underwater mines in preparation for D-Day
1969	Italy; Spain	The Battle of the Last Panzer (The Last Panzer Battalion)	La battaglia dell'ultimo panzer (in Italian); La batalla del último Panzer (in Spanish)	José Luis Merino	Surviving German tank crew attempt to reach friendly lines
1969	Yugoslavia	A Bloody Tale	Krvava bajka	Branimir Tori Janković	Kragujevac massacre, Serbia
1969	Yugoslavia	The Bridge	Most	Hajrudin Krvavac	Yugoslav partisans mine a heavily guarded bridge held by German forces
1969	United States	The Bridge at Remagen		John Guillermin	Battle between US & German forces for the Bridge at Remagen in 1945
1969	Italy	Code Name, Red Roses	Rose rosse per il Führer	Fernando Di Leo	An American major and some partisans try to capture an important German memoradum
1969	Poland	Day of Purification	Dzień oczyszczenia	Jerzy Passendorfer	Polish resistance and Soviet partisans in Poland, 1944
1969	Italy	Desert Battle (Desert Assault)	La battaglia del deserto (Inferno nel deserto)	Mino Loy	British and German soldiers in the desert in the area of Tobruk
1969	Italy	Eagles Over London (Battle Squadron / Battle Command)	La battaglia d'Inghilterra	Enzo G. Castellari	British officers pursue Nazi saboteurs through London
1969	Italy; Yugoslavia	The Fifth Day of Peace	Gott mit uns (Dio è con noi) (in Italian)	Giuliano Montaldo	13 May 1945 German deserter execution
1969	Italy	Five for Hell (Five into Hell)	5 per l'inferno	Gianfranco Parolini	Comedy-drama. Oddball US commandos with mission behind enemy lines
1969	Albania	The Guerrilla Unit	Njësiti guerril	Hysen Hakani	Albanian Resistance in Tirana during Italian occupation of Albania
1969	United Kingdom	Hannibal Brooks		Michael Winner	Adventure-comedy. British POW attempts escape from German captors with elephant
1969	Poland	How I Unleashed the Second World War	Jak rozpętałem drugą wojnę światową	Tadeusz Chmielewski	Comedy. Invasion of Poland, 1939 and Yugoslavia, Africa, Italy, and Poland, 1944
1969	Italy	Kill Rommel!	Uccidete Rommel	Alfonso Brescia	A mixed US-British commando tries to kill Rommel in North Africa
1969	Poland	The Last Days	Ostatnie dni	Jerzy Passendorfer	Eastern Front, 1945
1969	Soviet Union; East Germany; Poland; Italy	Liberation (The Great Battle)	Osvobozhdenie (Освобождение) (in Russian)	Yuri Ozerov, Julius Kun	Romance/Drama. Eastern Front from Battle for Kursk to Fall of Berlin; five-part film series
1969	United States	Love Camp 7 (Nazi Love Camp 7)		Lee Frost	British female officers infiltrate Nazi internment camp to reach inmate scientist
1969	United Kingdom	Mosquito Squadron		Boris Sagal	British bomber squadron targets German research camp and Vergeltungswaffe
1969	Poland	The Neighbours	Sąsiedzi	Aleksander Ścibor-Rylski	Bydgoszcz, Polish Campaign, 1939
1969	Philippines	Pambihirang tatlo	Pambihirang tatlo	Felix Villar	Filipino mission to destroy Japanese bastion along San Bernardino Strait
1969	United Kingdom	Play Dirty		André de Toth	British commando raid on enemy oil depot during the North African campaign
1969	Italy	The Reckoning ^{†} (TV miniseries)	La Resa dei Conti	Marco Leto	Fall of the Fascist regime in Italy and Verona trial
1969	Poland	Red Rowan	Jarzębina czerwona	Ewa Petelska, Czesław Petelski	Battle of Kolberg on Eastern Front
1969	Italy	Salt in the Wound (The Dirty Two)	Il dito nella piaga	Tonino Ricci	Condemned US soldiers survive Nazi ambush on way to execution and defend Italian village from invading Germans
1969	United States	The Secret of Santa Vittoria		Stanley Kramer	Aftermath of fall of Mussolini's Fascist government
1969	Italy	36 Hours in Hell	36 ore all'inferno	Roberto Bianchi Montero	Marine platoon scouts Japanese-occupied island before Allied invasion of Rabaul
1969	United States	The Thousand Plane Raid (The 1,000 Plane Raid)		Boris Sagal	Largest air armada on daytime mission targets German fighter plane production
1969	Hungary	The Toth Family	Isten hozta, őrnagy úr!	Zoltán Fábri	Comedy drama. Based on the play and novel by István Örkény
1969	United States	Wake Me When the War Is Over (TV)		Gene Nelson	Comedy about US airman sheltered from the Nazis by a German civilian
1969	Italy; Spain	War Devils	I diavoli della guerra	Bitto Albertini	Small units in North African desert battle, and French villa raid
1969	Yugoslavia	When You Hear the Bells	Kad čuješ zvona	Antun Vrdoljak	A partisan commissar, a Communist intellectual from Zagreb, must bring the group of Serb partisans in line
1969	Italy	Youth March	Giovinezza giovinezza	Franco Rossi	Two Italian friends: one becomes an antifascist deserter and the other an artillery officer

== 1970s ==
=== 1970–1974 ===
Year	Country	Main title (Alternative titles)	Original title (Original script)	Director	Battles, campaigns, events depicted
1970	Italy	Overrun	La lunga notte dei disertori – I 7 di Marsa Matruh	Mario Siciliano	Drama. A group of British soldiers are determined to get back to their own lines, picking up more allied survivors along the way.
1970	Greece	Lieutenant Natasha	Ipolochagos Natassa (Υπολοχαγός Νατάσσα)	Nikos Foskolos	Drama. Woman in the Greek resistance sent to Dachau
1970	United States	Carter's Army AKA Black Brigade (TV)		George McCowan	Blaxploitation Western Front television movie
1970	United States	Catch-22		Mike Nichols	Satirical black comedy about US bomber pilot during the Italian Campaign
1970	Italy; Spain	Churchill's Leopards	I leopardi di Churchill (in Italian)	Maurizio Pradeaux	English agent, posing as dead German officer twin, assists French Resistance and British commandos against SS, 1944
1970	Italy	Corbari	Corbari	Valentino Orsini	Italian resistance movement
1970	Poland	Face of an Angel	Twarz anioła	Zbigniew Chmielewski	Drama. Children in Nazi concentration camp in Łódź, Poland
1970	Italy; West Germany	The Garden of the Finzi-Continis	Il giardino dei Finzi Contini	Vittorio De Sica	Vittorio De Sica, Ugo Pirro and The Garden of the Finzi-Continis by Giorgio Bassani
1970	Philippines	Guerrilla Strike Force	Maharlika	Jerry Hopper	Japanese invasion of Manila Bay Released in 1987
1970	United Kingdom; United States	Hell Boats		Paul Wendkos	British motor torpedo boats operating in Mediterranean
1970	United States; Italy	Hornets' Nest		Phil Karlson, Franco Cirino	US paratrooper and boy partisans attack dam during Italian Campaign
1970	United States; Yugoslavia	Kelly's Heroes		Brian G. Hutton	Comedy drama about a group of US GIs who go AWOL to rob Nazi gold from a French bank
1970	Poland	Kolumbowie	Kolumbowie	Janusz Morgenstern	Polish underground Powstanie Warszawskie, 1944
1970	Spain/Italy	The Last Day of the War	El último día de la guerra	Juan Antonio Bardem	US and German soldiers seek to find a German scientist
1970	United Kingdom	The Last Escape		Walter Grauman	Allied commandos on mission to kidnap German scientists, 1945; shot in 1968
1970	Japan	The Last Kamikaze	Saigo no Tokkotai	Yahagi Toshihiko	Kamikaze attacks
1970	Poland; Soviet Union	Legenda	Legenda (in Polish)	Sylwester Chęciński	Polish resistance
1970	Italy	The Little War	Io non scappo... fuggo	Franco Prosperi	Comedy. War in Sicily and in Italy
1970	United Kingdom	The McKenzie Break (Escape)		Lamont Johnson	Irish intelligence officer investigates German POW camp disturbances in Scotland near end of war
1970	Denmark	October Days ^{†·}	Oktoberdage	Bent Christensen	
1970	Poland	Olympic Fire	Znicz olimpijski	Lech Lorentowicz	Zakopane, Polish resistance in Tatra Mountains
1970	Italy	Operation Snafu (Situation Normal: AFU)	Rosolino Paternò, soldato...	Nanni Loy	American landing in Sicily
1970	United States	Patton		Franklin Schaffner	1970 Best Picture chronicling the campaigns of General George S. Patton
1970	Philippines	Santiago!	Santiago!	Lino Brocka	Life in occupied Philippines
1970	Italy; Soviet Union	Sunflower	I Girasoli	Vittorio De Sica	Romance-drama. End of war search for Italian soldier lost on Eastern Front
1970	United States	Too Late the Hero (Suicide Run)		Robert Aldrich	British commando raid in the Pacific Campaign
1970	United States; Japan	Tora! Tora! Tora!	Tora Tora Tora! (トラ・トラ・トラ!)	Richard Fleischer, Kinji Fukasaku, Toshio Masuda	Attack on Pearl Harbor
1970	Japan	Turning Point of Showa History: The Militarists	Gekido no showashi 'Gunbatsu' (激動の昭和史 軍閥)	Hiromichi Horikawa	Hideki Tōjō's biography during Pacific War
1970	United Kingdom/USA co-production shot in Ireland	Underground		Arthur H. Nadel	French Resistance adventure
1971	Japan	The Battle of Okinawa	Gekido no Showashi: Okinawa kessen (激動の昭和史 沖縄決戦)	Kihachi Okamoto	Battle of Okinawa through eyes of Japanese Army, Navy, aviation, civilians, and generals
1971	United States	The Birdmen (Colditz: Escape of the Birdmen) television movie		Philip Leacock	Adventure. POWs in castle prison build glider
1971	United Kingdom	Dad's Army		Norman Cohen	Comedy based on Dad's Army TV series. British Home Guard
1971	Italy	The Long Shadow of the Wolf ^{†}	La lunga ombra del lupo	Gianni Manera	Italian Civil War
1971	South Africa	Mr. Kingstreet's War		Percival Rubens	US couple defend their land in Africa at the start of WWII
1971	United Kingdom	Murphy's War		Peter Yates	Survivor of merchant ship looks to take revenge on U-boat that sunk him
1971	Yugoslavia	The Pine Tree in the Mountain	U gori raste zelen bor	Antun Vrdoljak	A Yugoslav Communist Party commissioner is sent to a lowland village to monitor the local partisans
1971	United States	Raid on Rommel		Henry Hathaway	North African campaign (TV) Television movie reuses footage from Tobruk (1967)
1971	Philippines	Sangre	Sangre (in Spanish)	Armando Garces	Battle of Filipino Guerrillas with the Imperial Japanese Army
1971	Poland	The Third Part of the Night	Trzecia część nocy	Andrzej Żuławski	Polish Resistance
1971	Bulgaria	Three Reservists	Trimata ot zapasa (Тримата от запаса)	Zako Heskija	Comedy-drama. Bulgarian soldiers in Hungary, 1945
1971	Poland	Top Agent	Agent nr 1	Zbigniew Kuźmiński	Jerzy Iwanow-Szajnowicz, Polish SOE agent in Greek Resistance
1971	Soviet Union	Trial on the Road	Proverka na dorogakh (Проверка на дорогах)	Aleksei German	Former Russian POW joins partisans, Winter 1942
1971	Greece	What Did You Do in the War, Thanasi?	Ti ekanes ston polemo, Thanasi? (Τι έκανες στον πόλεμο, Θανάση)	Dinos Katsouridis	Anti-war comedy. Hapless man caught up between the Greek Resistance and the Germans
1972	India	Challenge	Lalkaar	Ramanand Sagar	Drama based on book by Ramanand Sagar (writer). Indian Army and Indian Air Force action against a secret Japanese Air Strip construction between Burma and Assam, near Indian state of Nagaland, 1942
1972	Soviet Union	The Dawns Here Are Quiet	A zori zdes tikhie (А зори здесь тихие)	Stanislav Rostotsky	Drama based on book by Boris Vasilyev. Female Soviet anti-aircraft squad encounter with platoon of Nazi paratroopers on Karelian Front, 1941
1972	Soviet Union	Hot Snow	Goryachiy Sneg (Горячий снег)	Gavriil Egiazarov	Drama based on Yuri Bondarev novel. German attempt to extract Sixth Army from Stalingrad in Winter of 1942
1972	United Kingdom	Beyond the Call of Duty (Canada)/ Operation: Fred (US)	Our Miss Fred	Bob Kellett	During the Battle of France an RASC female impersonator entertaining the troops avoids capture when the Germans capture his audience. On his way to England he comes across an English girls school group and a downed RAF pilot, 1940
1972	Japan	Under the Flag of the Rising Sun	Gunki hatameku motoni (軍旗はためく下に)	Kinji Fukasaku	Japanese veterans recall experiences to a war widow on quest to exonerate husband executed for desertion
1972	Yugoslavia	Walter Defends Sarajevo	Valter brani Sarajevo (Валтер брани Сарајево)	Hajrudin Krvavac	Partisans try to prevent the Germans to use a fuel depot in Sarajevo during their retreat from the Balkans in late 1944
1973	Yugoslavia	The Battle of Sutjeska	Sutjeska (Сутјеска)	Stipe Delić	Battle of the Sutjeska between Yugoslav partisans and the Germans
1973	Yugoslavia	Bombers ^{†}	Bombaši (Бомбаши)	Predrag Golubović	Two Yugoslav partisans must blow up some bunkers in order to stop the Germans
1973	United States	Death Race (State of Division) (Television movie)		David Lowell Rich	German panzer chases American P-40 across North African desert, 1942
1973	Philippines	Dugo ng Bayan	Dugo ng Bayan	Armando A. Herrera	Remake. Filipino Resistance.
1973	United Kingdom; Italy	Hitler: The Last Ten Days		Ennio De Concini	Last days of Hitler during Battle of Berlin
1973	Poland	Hubal	Hubal	Bohdan Poręba	Henryk Dobrzański in Polish Campaign, 1939–1940
1973	China	Little 8th Route Army	Xiaobalu (小八路)	Lei You	Animated. Sino-Japanese War
1973	Italy	Massacre in Rome	Rappresaglia	George P. Cosmatos	Ardeatine massacre by Germans of multiple Italian civiians as revenge for partisan attacks
1973	France; Italy	Now Where Did the 7th Company Get to?	Mais où est donc passée la septième compagnie? (in French)	Robert Lamoureux	Comedy. French signal corpsmen during May 1940 débâcle; first of trilogy
1973	Soviet Union (Ukrainian SSR)	Only "Old Men" Are Going Into Battle	В бой идут одни «старики»	Leonid Bykov	Fighter pilots of Soviet Air Forces Vs Luftwaffe clash before Battle of the Dnieper
1973	France	The Train (The Last Train)	Le Train	Pierre Granier-Deferre	Based on Georges Simenon novel. Frenchman and Jewish-German woman meet on train while escaping German army to France
1973	Hong Kong; South Korea	When Taekwondo Strikes	Tai quan zhen jiu zhou (跆拳震九州) (in Yue Chinese)	Feng Huang	Martial arts. Japanese occupation of Korea
1974	United Kingdom	Adolf Hitler: My Part in His Downfall		Norman Cohen	Comedy. Basic training of British conscripts
1974	France	Black Thursday	Les guichets du Louvre	Michel Mitrani	First large-scale roundup of Jews in Paris and man saving as many as possible, 1942
1974	Soviet Union (Estonian SSR)	The Dangerous Games	Ohtlikud mängud (in Estonian); Opasnye igry (Опасные игры) (in Russian)	Veljo Käsper	Occupation of Estonia by Nazi Germany
1974	Bulgaria	Dawn Over the Drava	Zarevo nad Drava (Зарево над Драва)	Zako Heskija	Drama. Bulgarian army fights German troops at the Battle of the Drava, 1945
1974	Taiwan	The Everlasting Glory	Ying lie qian qiu (英烈千秋)	Tin Shan Sui	Biography of Zhang Zizhong during Sino-Japanese War
1974	United States	The Execution of Private Slovik (TV)		Lamont Johnson	Drama based on William Bradford Huie book. Pvt. Eddie Slovik, the only US soldier to be executed for desertion during war
1974	Japan	Father of the Kamikaze	Ā Kessen Kōkūtai (あゝ決戦航空隊)	Kosaku Yamashita	Drama. Admiral Takijirō Ōnishi
1974	Poland	Heads Full of Stars	Głowy pełne gwiazd	Janusz Kondratiuk	Eastern Front and German Occupation of Poland, 1944
1974	Japan	Karafuto Summer 1945: Gate of Ice and Snow	Karafuto 1945 Summer Hyosetsu no Mon (樺太1945年夏 氷雪の門)	Mitsuo Murayama	Soviet invasion of Karafuto prompts nine Japanese women to commit suicide
1974	France; West Germany; Italy	Lacombe Lucien (Lacombe, Lucien)	Lacombe Lucien (in French)	Louis Malle	French Resistance and collaboration
1974	Italy	Last Days of Mussolini	Mussolini ultimo atto	Carlo Lizzani	The last days of Benito Mussolini
1974	Yugoslavia	Red Attack ^{†}	Crveni Udar (Црвени удар)	Predrag Golubović	Resistance in a mine in German-occupied Kosovo
1974	Poland; Soviet Union	Remember Your Name	Zapamiętaj imię swoje (in Polish); Pomni imya svoye (Помни имя свое) (in Russian)	Siergiej Kołosow	Tragedy of children in war
1974	Italy	Salvo D'Acquisto	Salvo D'Acquisto	Romolo Guerrieri	Salvo D'Acquisto, an Italian policeman saved civilian hostages by surrendered to the Germans
1974	United Kingdom	Undercovers Hero	Soft Beds, Hard Battle	Roy Boulting	Comedy. Brothel during the German occupation of France
1974	Yugoslavia	The Republic of Užice	Užička republika (Ужичка република)	Žika Mitrović	Drama. Short-lived partisan Republic of Užice, 1941

=== 1975–1979 ===
Year	Country	Main title (Alternative titles)	Original title (Original script)	Director	Battles, campaigns, events depicted
1975	Philippines	Dugo at Pag Ibig sa Kapirasiong Lupa	Dugo at Pag Ibig sa Kapirasiong Lupa	Ding M. De Jesus, Cesar Gallardo, Armando A. Herrera, Johnny Pangilinan, Romy Suzara	Filipino resistance from the Spanish period to the Japanese
1975	Yugoslavia	The Farm in the Small Marsh	Salas u Malom Ritu (Салаш у Малом Риту)	Branko Bauer	German occupation of the Banat
1975	United States	Ilsa, She Wolf of the SS		Don Edmonds	Exploitation film about sadistic Nazi prison camp commandant.
1975	Poland	In the Days Before the Spring	W te dni przedwiosenne	Andrzej Konic	Eastern Front, 1945
1975	East Germany; Czechoslovakia	Jacob the Liar	Jakob der Lügner (in German)	Frank Beyer	Based on Jurek Becker novel. Eastern European Jewish ghetto, 1944
1975	Poland	Leaves Have Fallen	Opadły liście z drzew	Stanisław Różewicz	Polish Resistance
1975	Poland	My War – My Love	Moja wojna, moja miłość	Janusz Nasfeter	Polish Campaign, 1939
1975	France; West Germany	The Old Gun (Vengeance One by One)	Le vieux fusil	Robert Enrico	French surgeon pushed to take revenge against SS atrocities in his village
1975	Romania	No Trespassing	Pe aici nu se trece	Doru Năstase	Battle of Păuliș in 1944 between Hungarian and Romanian troops, after Romania had joined the Allies.
1975	Soviet Union	Only Old Men Are Going to Battle	V boy idut odni stariki (В бой идут одни старики)	Leonid Bykov	Comedy-drama. Soviet pilots
1975	United States; Czechoslovakia	Operation Daybreak (The Price of Freedom)		Lewis Gilbert	Drama based on Operation Anthropoid assassination of SS General Reinhard Heydrich in Prague
1975	United Kingdom	Overlord		Stuart Cooper	Young soldier trains with East Yorkshire Regiment in preparation for Normandy landings
1975	Poland	A Partita for a Wind Instrument	Partita na instrument drewniany	Janusz Zaorski	Polish Resistance
1975	Italy	Salò, or the 120 Days of Sodom	Salò o le 120 giornate di Sodoma	Pier Paolo Pasolini	Controversial horror art film. Wealthy fascist libertines after the fall of Mussolini's regime in the Republic of Salò, 1944
1975	Italy	Seven Beauties	Pasqualino Settebellezze	Lina Wertmüller	Satirical dark comedy. Mobster is conscripted in Italian Army to avoid prison
1975	France	The Seventh Company Has Been Found	On a retrouvé la septième compagnie	Robert Lamoureux	Comedy. French signal corpsmen during May 1940 débâcle and in officers POW camp/castle; second of trilogy
1975	France	Special Section	Section spéciale	Costa-Gavras	Special court where judges condemn innocents to death to please Germans during occupation
1975	Soviet Union	They Fought for Their Country	Oni srazhalis za Rodinu (Они сражались за Родину)	Sergey Bondarchuk	Rearguard action of Soviet platoon during German drive on Stalingrad
1975	Greece	The Travelling Players	O Thiasos (Ο Θίασος)	Theodoros Angelopoulos	German invasion and occupation of Greece
1976	Italy	And Agnes Chose to Die	L'Agnese va a morire	Giuliano Montaldo	Italian resistance movement
1976	Poland	Birds to Birds	Ptaki, ptakom...	Paweł Komorowski	Silesia Polish Campaign, 1939
1976	Denmark	The Brief Summer	Den korte sommer	Edward Fleming	Woman falls in love with German soldier
1976	United Kingdom	The Eagle Has Landed		John Sturges	German plot to kidnap Winston Churchill, based on novel by Jack Higgins.
1976	United States	Farewell to Manzanar (TV)		John Korty	Japanese American internment camp of Manzanar
1976	Hungary	The Fifth Seal	Az ötödik pecsét	Zoltán Fábri	Drama. Based on the novel by Ferenc Sánta
1976	Yugoslavia	Maiden Bridge	Devojački most (Девојачки мост)	Miomir 'Miki' Stamenkovic	Exchange of prisoners between Germans and Yugoslav partisans
1976	United States	Midway (The Battle of Midway)		Jack Smight	Battle of Midway between US Navy and Japanese carrier fleets in the Pacific
1976	France; Italy	Mr. Klein	Monsieur Klein (in French)	Joseph Losey	French Resistance and collaboration
1976	Yugoslavia	The Peaks of Zelengora	Vrhovi Zelengore (Врхови Зеленгоре)	Zdravko Velimirović	Battle of Sutjeska between Yugoslav partisans and the occupying Germans
1976	Poland	Polish Roads (TV miniseries)	Polskie drogi	Krzysztof Prymek, Janusz Morgenstern	Poland, 1939–43; in four-parts
1976	Italy; West Germany; France	Salon Kitty (Madam Kitty)	Salon Kitty	Tinto Brass	Exploitation. Nazi use of Salon Kitty brothel for espionage and Allied counter-espionage
1976	Soviet Union; Bulgaria	The Soldier of the Supply Column	Voynikat ot oboza (Войникът от обоза) (in Bulgarian); Bratyuzhka (Братюшка) (in Russian)	Igor Dobrolyubov	Soviet army in Bulgaria
1976	Philippines	Three Years Without God	Tatlong taong walang Diyos	Mario O'Hara	Japanese occupation of the Philippines
1976	Poland	To Save the City	Ocalić miasto	Jan Łomnicki	Polish resistance fight to save Kraków from destruction by retreating German forces in 1945
1976	Taiwan	Victory	Mei hua (電影)	Chia Chang Liu	Japanese occupation of Taiwan (1937–1945)
1976	Japan	Zero Pilot	Ōzora no samurai (天空的武士)	Seiji Maruyama	Based on novel Samurai!; Saburō Sakai's biography while piloting Mitsubishi A6M Zero
1976	Vietnam; Soviet Union	Star of August	Sao Tháng Tám	Trần Đắc; Đức Hoàn	Final months of Japanese occupation of French Indochina
1977	Soviet Union	The Ascent	Voskhozhdeniye (Восхождение)	Larisa Shepitko	Soviet partisans in Byelorussian village spotted by German patrol
1977	Canada	Bethune (TV)		Eric Till	Drama. Montreal doctor Norman Bethune in Spanish Civil War, then China for Sino-Japanese War
1977	United Kingdom; United States	A Bridge Too Far		Richard Attenborough	Operation Market Garden, the failed Allied airborne operation against the Nazi-occupied Netherlands
1977	Albania	Tomka and his friends	Tonka dhe shoket e tij	Xhanfise Kiko	Children avenge the Nazi occupiers of their playing ground by collecting information for partisans and neutralizing the German Shepherd guard dog.
1977	United Kingdom; West Germany	Cross of Iron		Sam Peckinpah	German soldiers on the Russian Front
1977	Taiwan	Eight Hundred Heroes	Bā bǎi zhuàngshì (八百壮士)	Ting Shan-hsi	Drama. Defense of Sihang Warehouse
1977	France; Spain	Hitler's Last Train	Train spécial pour SS (in French)	Alain Payet	Rail journey of nightclub singer and young women in her charge drafted by Hitler for SS service
1977	Poland	The Last Round (TV)	Ostatnie okrążenie	Krzysztof Rogulski, Ludmiła Niedbalska	German Occupation of Poland and Gestapo murder of Olympic gold-medalist Janusz Kusociński
1977	United States	MacArthur		Joseph Sargent	General Douglas MacArthur
1977	East Germany	Mama, I'm Alive	Mama, ich lebe	Konrad Wolf	German POWs join Red Army then infiltrate Nazi lines
1977	Poland	Palace Hotel	Palace Hotel	Ewa Kruk	Poland, 1939–44
1977	France	The Seventh Company Outdoors	La septième compagnie au clair de lune	Robert Lamoureux	Comedy. French signal corpsmen resisting German invasion/occupation; last of trilogy
1977	Soviet Union (Armenian SSR)	The Soldier and the Elephant	Zinvorn u pighe (Солдат и слон) (in Russian) (Զինվորն ու փիղը) (in Armenian)	Dmitri Kesayants	Soldier brings an elephant from Germany to the Yerevan Zoo.
1977	Netherlands	Soldier of Orange (Survival Run)	Soldaat van Oranje	Paul Verhoeven	Dutch Resistance
1978	Yugoslavia	Battle for the Railway	Dvoboj za juznu prugu (Двобој за јужну пругу)	Zdravko Velimirović	Yugoslav partisans fight against Germans and Bulgarians to interrupt a railroad in Southern Serbia
1978	Yugoslavia	Boško Buha	Boško Buha (Бошко Буха)	Branko Bauer	Yugoslav partisan hero Boško Buha
1978	United States; West Germany; Switzerland	Brass Target		John Hough	The Algonquin Project 1974 novel by Frederick Nolan
1978	Hungary	Deliver Us from Evil	Szabadíts meg a gonosztól	Pál Sándor	Drama.
1978	United Kingdom	Force 10 from Navarone		Guy Hamilton	British commando raid in Yugoslavia
1978	Italy	The Greatest Battle	Il grande attacco	Umberto Lenzi	Five athletes of the Berlin Olympic Games fight in World War II
1978	United States	Holocaust (TV miniseries)		Marvin J. Chomsky	German-Jewish family enduring the Holocaust
1978	Poland	Hospital of the Transfiguration	Szpital przemienienia	Edward Żebrowski	Drama. Polish psychiatric hospital and its Gestapo roundup for concentration camps, 1943
1978	Poland	A Hundred Horses to a Hundred Shores	Sto koni do stu brzegów	Zbigniew Kuźmiński	Polish soldier escapes Stalag tasked with delivering information across Europe while evading Gestapo
1978	Hungary	Hungarians	Magyarok	Zoltán Fábri	Drama. Hungarian immigrant workers during World War II in Nazi Germany.
1978	Italy	The Inglorious Bastards (G.I. Bro / Counterfeit Commandos)		Enzo G. Castellari	American soldiers escape military prison and aide French resistance on mission to steal Nazi V-2 prototype gyroscope
1978	Poland	Operation Arsenal	Akcja pod Arsenałem	Jan Łomnicki	Based on an Aleksander Kamiński novel. Szare Szeregi and Operation Arsenal during occupation of Poland, 1943
1978	Netherlands	Pastorale 1943	Pastorale 1943	Wim Verstappen	Dutch Resistance
1978	Poland	Shadow Dead	Umarli rzucają cień	Julian Dziedzina	Silesian Polish Resistance
1978	Poland	To the Last Drop of Blood	Do krwi ostatniej	Jerzy Hoffman	Creation of the Polish 1st Infantry Division in the USSR during WW2 and its first battle
1978	Poland	Wherever You Are, Mr. President	... Gdziekolwiek jesteś Panie Prezydencie	Andrzej Trzos-Rastawiecki	Warsaw – Polish Campaign, 1939
1979	United Kingdom	The Passage		J. Lee Thompson	Story of Basque guide helping chemist Bergson and his family escape over the Pyrenees with Nazi fanatic Capt. Von Berkow in hot pursuit.
1979	Yugoslavia	Battle Squadron	Partizanska eskadrila (Партизанска ескадрила)	Hajrudin Krvavac	The first Yugoslav partisan Air Force unit
1979	West Germany	Breakthrough	Steiner – Das Eiserne Kreuz, 2. Teil	Andrew V. McLaglen	July 20 plot; sequel to Cross of Iron
1979	Poland	Elegy	Elegia	Paweł Komorowski	Polish soldiers fighting the Nazis on the Eastern Front, 1945
1979	United Kingdom	Escape to Athena		George Pan Cosmatos	Comedy-Drama about allied POWs and Greek resistance sabotaging a German rocket base.
1979	Italy; Spain; France	From Hell to Victory		"Hank Milestone" (Umberto Lenzi)	Varying wartime experiences of six French friends
1979	United Kingdom; United States	Hanover Street		Peter Hyams	American bomber pilot based in England, flying missions and his romance with an English nurse
1979	United States	Ike (TV miniseries)		Boris Sagal, Melville Shavelson	Drama. Wartime romance of General Dwight D. Eisenhower
1979	Poland	A Long Way to Go	Droga daleka przed nami	Władysław Ślesicki	Polish soldier's escape from Stalag
1979	Poland	Morning Stars	Gwiazdy poranne	Henryk Bielski	Eastern Front, 1944
1979	Soviet Union (Estonian SSR)	Nest in the Winds	Tuulte pesa (in Estonian)	Olav Neuland	Partisan groups, known as Forest Brothers wage a guerrilla war verses German troops in the Baltic states
1979	United States	1941		Steven Spielberg	Comedy. California coast one week after attack on Pearl Harbor
1979	Albania	The Radio Station	Radiostacioni	Rikard Ljarja	Based on Ismail Kadare novel Novembre d'une capitale. Albanian Resistance attempt to take over Tirana Radio, November 1944
1979	Poland	Salad Days	Zielone lata	Stanisław Jędryka	Drama. Tragedy of Polish, Jewish and German children in Sosnowiec, Poland, 1939
1979	Poland	Secret of Enigma	Sekret Enigmy	Roman Wionczek	Cryptologist Marian Rejewski and the Enigma machine
1979	Hungary; West Germany	A Sunday in October	Októberi vasárnap / Ein Sonntag im Oktober	András Kovács	Drama. Operation Panzerfaust in October, 1944.
1979	West Germany	The Tin Drum	Die Blechtrommel	Volker Schlöndorff	Profound yet hilarious perspective on Nazism and the human condition in Danzig he sees as filled with hypocrisy and injustice, and creates a disturbance by tin drum in order to bring attention to a cause.
1979	United Kingdom	Yanks		John Schlesinger	Relationships between US servicemen stationed in England, and local women during preparations for the D-Day landings.

== 1980s ==
=== 1980–1984 ===
Year	Country	Main title (Alternative titles)	Original title (Original script)	Director	Battles, campaigns, events depicted
1980	United States	The Big Red One		Samuel Fuller	US 1st Infantry Division in North Africa, Sicily, and Europe, 1942–45
1980	Poland	The Birthday	Urodziny młodego warszawiaka	Ewa Petelska, Czesław Petelski	Polish Campaign, 1939 and Polish Resistance, Warsaw Uprising, 1944
1980	Poland	The Death Sentence	Wyrok śmierci	Witold Orzechowski	Polish Resistance and Zamość, Poland
1980	Philippines	Eagle	Aguila	Eddie Romero	Story of elderly man's life, including his experiences during WW II
1980	Poland	'40 Olympics	Olimpiada '40	Andrzej Kotkowski	Clandestine Olympiad held by Allied prisoners in German Stalag, 1940
1980	Philippines	.45-Caliber	Kalibre .45	Nilo Saez	Story of vengeance near end of Japanese occupation of the Philippines
1980	West Germany	Germany Pale Mother	Deutschland bleiche Mutter	Helma Sanders-Brahms	Young couple in Germany get married just before outbreak of war
1980	France	The Last Metro	Le dernier métro	François Truffaut	German occupation of France
1980	Italy	Men or Not Men	Uomini e no	Valentino Orsini	Italian resistance movement
1980	United Kingdom; Switzerland; United States	The Sea Wolves		Andrew V. McLaglen	Members of the British Calcutta Light Horse mission to sink a German merchant ship in Goa, India
1980	Poland	Vistula Day	Dzień Wisły	Tadeusz Kijański	Warsaw Uprising, 1944
1980	Poland	"W" Hour	Godzina "W"	Janusz Morgenstern	Polish Resistance and Warsaw Uprising, 1944
1981	Switzerland; West Germany; Austria	The Boat is Full	Das Boot ist voll	Markus Imhoof	German and Austrian refugees escape to neutral Switzerland hoping to find asylum by posing as family
1981	France	Bolero: Dance of Life	Les uns et les autres	Claude Lelouch	Musical drama. Four musical families of different backgrounds and nationalities followed from 1930s–1980s as their paths cross; film also released as TV miniseries, 1981
1981	United States	The Bunker		George Schaefer	Based on book The Bunker. Last days of Hitler
1981	West Germany	Das Boot (The Boat)	Das Boot	Wolfgang Petersen	U-Boat crew fighting in the Battle of the Atlantic
1981	United States	Escape to Victory (Victory)		John Huston	Propaganda football match between German soldiers and Allied POWs
1981	United Kingdom	Eye of the Needle		Richard Marquand	German spy in England before D-Day
1981	Soviet Union (Lithuanian SSR)	Faktas	Faktas (in Lithuanian); Fakt (Факт) (in Russian)	Almantas Grikevičius	
1981	Poland	General Boldyn	Bołdyn	Ewa Petelska, Czesław Petelski	Polish Resistance
1981	Netherlands	The Girl with the Red Hair	Het meisje met het rode haar	Ben Verbong	Dutch Resistance
1981	Japan	The Imperial Navy	Rengo kantai (連合艦隊)	Shūe Matsubayashi	Operation Ten-Go and battleship Yamato
1981	France	Let's Go Children	Allons Z'enfants	Yves Boisset	Drama. Young Cadet in French military school who dislikes soldiering but conscripted into Phony War service, 1939–1940
1981	Poland	Lynx: The Smile of the Evil Eye	Ryś	Stanisław Różewicz	Polish Resistance
1981	Italy	The Skin	La pelle	Liliana Cavani	American occupation of Naples
1981	Soviet Union; France; Switzerland; Spain	Teheran 43 (Assassination Attempt / The Eliminator)	Tegeran-43 (Тегеран-43) (in Russian)	Aleksandr Alov, Vladimir Naumov	Thriller. Assassination plot against Churchill, Roosevelt and Stalin at Tehran Conference, 1943
1982	Yugoslavia	13th of July ^{†}	13. jul (13. јул)	Radomir Saranović	Uprising in Montenegro, against new political leaders, 1941
1982	Poland	Ash Wednesday (TV)	Popielec	Ryszard Ber	Polish village under German occupation
1982	Australia; Taiwan	Attack Force Z (Z Force)		Tim Burstall	Joint Australian, British, New Zealand commando unit, Z Special Unit fighting Japanese forces
1982	Philippines	Gold, Silver, Death	Oro, Plata, Mata	Peque Gallaga	Fall of Corregidor completing the Japanese takeover of the Philippines in 1942
1982	Australia; Japan; Singapore	The Highest Honour (The Southern Cross / Heroes of the Krait)		Seiji Maruyama, Peter Maxwell	Allied special forces unit undertake Operation Jaywick and Operation Rimau against the Japanese
1982	Japan	The Lily Tower ^{†}	Himeyuri no Tō (ひめゆりの塔)	Tadashi Imai	A group of high school girls trained as nurses witness the horrors of war first-hand on Okinawa
1982	Australia	Sarah (Sarah and the Squirrel)	The Seventh Match	Yoram Gross, Athol Henry	An orphaned girl successfully finishes a task, the local resistance were unable to.
1982	Italy	The Night of the Shooting Stars	La Notte di San Lorenzo	Paolo Taviani, Vittorio Taviani	Comedy-drama. Italians hear rumors of Nazi plan to raze their town when Americans are about to liberate them, 1944
1982	Italy	Odd Squad	Ciao nemico	Enzo Barboni	Comedy. Allied invasion of Sicily
1982	United States	Sophie's Choice		Alan J. Pakula	Polish Catholic concentration camp survivor
1982	Poland	Tribute to a Gray Day	Haracz szarego dnia	Roman Wionczek, Krzysztof Prymek	Polish Resistance
1982	Poland	Upside Down	Do góry nogami	Stanisław Jędryka	Drama. Polish Silesia and tragedy of children in war
1982	West Germany	The White Rose	Die Weiße Rose	Michael Verhoeven	Execution of White Rose members who protested against the Nazi regime in Germany
1983	Poland; West Germany	After Your Decrees	Wedle wyroków twoich... (in Polish); Blutiger Schnee (in German)	Jerzy Hoffman	Holocaust in Poland
1983	Yugoslavia	Balkan Express	Balkan ekspres (Балкан експрес)	Lee H. Katzin	Comedy. Criminals earn living as fake musical band during Nazi occupation of Serbia
1983	Japan	Barefoot Gen	Hadashi no Gen (はだしのゲン)	Mori Masaki	Anime. Dropping of Little Boy on Hiroshima, Japan
1983	United States; Hungary	Brady's Escape (Hosszú vágta)		Pál Gábor	Drama.
1983	Poland	The Crash off Gibraltar	Katastrofa w Gibraltarze	Bohdan Poręba	Drama. General Władysław Sikorski, Prime Minister of Polish Government in Exile, Commander-in-Chief of Polish Armed Forces, 1943
1983	Poland	Dawn Porter (TV)	Tragarz puchu	Stefan Szlachtycz	Holocaust in Poland
1983	France	Gramps is in the Resistance	Papy fait de la résistance	Jean-Marie Poiré	Comedy. French Resistance in Occupied France
1983	Yugoslavia	Great Transport	Veliki transport (Велики транспорт)	Veljko Bulajić	The great transport of partisans from Vojvodina to Bosnia in 1943
1983	Hong Kong	Hong Kong, 1941	Dang doi lai ming (等待黎)	Leong Po-Chih	Japanese occupation of Hong Kong
1983	Yugoslavia	The Igman March	Igmanski marš (Игмански марш)	Zdravko Šotra	The 1st Proletarian Brigade, pursued by the German 342. Infanterie-Division, crosses the Igman in what is known as the "Igman March" during Operation Southeast Croatia
1983	United Kingdom; Japan	Merry Christmas, Mr. Lawrence	Senjō no merī Kurisumasu (戦場のメリークリスマス) (Furyo / 俘虜)	Nagisa Oshima	Drama based on Laurens van der Post books. British POWs on Java
1983	China	One and Eight	Yīge hé bāge (一个和八个)	Zhang Junzhao	Criminals and Eighth Route Army deserters battle Japanese
1983	Poland	Postcard From a Journey	Kartka z podróży	Waldemar Dziki	Holocaust in Poland
1983	Hungary	The Revolt of Job	Jób lázadása	Imre Gyöngyössy, Barna Kabay	Childless Jewish couple adopt Hungarian boy during war
1983	Philippines	Roman Rapido	Roman Rapido	Argel Joseph	Battle of Filipino soldiers and guerrillas with Imperial Japanese Army
1983	United States; United Kingdom; Italy	The Scarlet and the Black (TV)		Jerry London	Drama. Monsignor Hugh O'Flaherty and anti-Nazi activity, 1943–45
1983	Poland	There Was No Sun That Spring	Nie było słońca tej wiosny	Juliusz Janicki, Slawomir Janicki	Holocaust in Poland
1983	Canada	The Tin Flute	Bonheur d'occasion (in French)	Claude Fournier	Drama based on Gabrielle Roy novel. Quebec home front
1983	United States	To Be or Not to Be		Alan Johnson	Comedy-drama. Polish actor and Nazi invasion of Poland; remake of 1942 To Be or Not to Be
1983	Soviet Union	Torpedo Bombers	Torpedonostsi (Торпедоносцы)	Semyon Aranovich	Soviet pilots fighting German bombers that are attacking British navy convoys
1983	Denmark	Traitors	Forræderne	Ole Roos	Drama. Free Corps Denmark deserters from Eastern Front, 1945
1983	United States	Winds of War (TV miniseries)		Dan Curtis	Drama based on Herman Wouk novel. Family saga leading to Attack on Pearl Harbor
1984	Canada	Charlie Grant's War (TV)		Martin Lavut	Drama. Canadian Charlie Grant, Holocaust saviour
1984	Italy	Claretta	Claretta	Pasquale Squitieri	Drama. Mussolini's mistress Clara Petacci in 1943–45
1984	Poland	The Fourth Day	Dzień czwarty	Ludmiła Niedbalska	Warsaw Uprising, 1944
1984	Poland	I Died to Live (TV)	Umarłem, aby żyć	Stanisław Jędryka	Polish Resistance, 1941
1984	Poland	I Shall Always Stand Guard	Na straży swej stać będę	Kazimierz Kutz	Polish Resistance in Silesia, 1939–42
1984	Australia	The Last Bastion (TV miniseries)		George Miller	War from Australian perspective
1984	Switzerland; France; Italy; West Germany; United States	Mussolini and I (TV miniseries)	Io e il Duce	Alberto Negrin	Galeazzo Ciano and Mussolini
1984	Italy; France	Nights and Fogs ^{†} (TV miniseries)	Notti e nebbie (in Italian)	Marco Tullio Giordana	Police of the Italian Social Republic
1984	Poland	Romance with the Intruder	Romans z intruzem	Waldemar Podgórski	Invasion of Poland, 1939
1983	United States	A Soldier's Story		Norman Jewison	Mystery drama adapted by Charles Fuller from his Pulitzer Prize-winning A Soldier's Play
1984	Soviet Union (Estonian SSR)	Under a False Name	Võõra nime all	Peeter Urbla	Estonians in Soviet gulag
1984	West Germany	The Wannsee Conference (TV)	Die Wannseekonferenz	Heinz Schirk	German officials attend Wannsee Conference by SS Chief of Security Reinhard Heydrich to discuss Final Solution to Jewish question, 1942
1984	China	Yellow Earth	Huáng tǔdì (黄土地)	Chen Kaige	Sino-Japanese War

=== 1985–1989 ===
Year	Country	Main title (Alternative titles)	Original title (Original script)	Director	Battles, campaigns, events depicted
1985	United Kingdom	Arch of Triumph (TV)		Waris Hussein	Romance based on Erich Maria Remarque novel. Austrian anti-Nazi in Paris
1985	United States; Italy	The Assisi Underground		Alexander Ramati	German occupation of Assisi
1985	Soviet Union	Battalions Ask for Fire (TV miniseries)	Batalyony prosyat ognya (Батальоны просят огня)	Aleksandr Bogolyubov, Vladimir Chebotaryov	Soviet battalion crossing Dnieper River to liberate Kiev from Germans, 1943
1985	Soviet Union; East Germany; Czechoslovakia; Vietnam	The Battle for Moscow	Bitva za Moskvu (Битва за Москву) (in Russian)	Yuri Ozerov	Operation Barbarossa to Battle of Moscow
1985	Netherlands	Bitter Sweet	Het bittere kruid	Kees van Oostrum	Jewish family hiding in wartime Amsterdam
1985	Japan	The Burmese Harp	Biruma no tategoto (ビルマの竪琴)	Kon Ichikawa	Burma campaign; remake version
1985	United States	Code Name: Emerald		Jonathan Sanger	Battle of Normandy
1985	Soviet Union	Come and See	Idi i smotri (Иди и смотри)	Elem Klimov	In early 1943, a teenage boy joins the partisans in the German-occupied Byelorussian SSR. He discovers the reality of war and the barbarity of the SS and collaborating auxiliary police on the civilian population.
1985	Poland; Czechoslovakia	Cuckoo in a Dark Forest	Kukačka v temném lese (in Czech); Kukułka w ciemnym lesie (in Polish)	Antonín Moskalyk	German occupation of Czechoslovakia, concentration camp kommandant and child
1985	Poland	Dad	Tate	Jan Rutkiewicz	Holocaust in Poland
1985	United States	The Dirty Dozen: Next Mission (Dirty Dozen 2) (TV)		Andrew V. McLaglen	Allied convicts in elite unit on mission to "prevent" assassination of Hitler
1985	United States	Hitler's SS: Portrait in Evil (TV)		Jim Goddard	Brothers cope with life in Nazi Germany, 1932–45
1985	United Kingdom	The Holcroft Covenant		John Frankenheimer	Based on Robert Ludlum novel. German General's son conspires to control hidden Nazi funds
1985	Netherlands	The Ice-cream Parlour	De IJssalon	Dimitri Frenkel Frank	Romance between Dutch woman and Wehrmacht officer
1985	Poland	In the Shadow of Hatred	W cieniu nienawiści	Wojciech Żółtowski	Holocaust in Poland, 1943
1985	Italy; France	Madman at War	Scemo di guerra (in Italian); Le fou de guerre (in French)	Dino Risi	A young Italian psychiatrist is sent to troops in Libya
1985	United States	Mussolini and I (TV)		Alberto Negrin	Docudrama. Mussolini's son in-law Galeazzo Ciano
1985	Japan	The Seburi Story	Seburi monogatari (瀬降り物語)	Sadao Nakajima	Hardships of nomadic Seburi of western Japan during war
1985	Finland	The Unknown Soldier	Tuntematon sotilas	Rauni Mollberg	Finno-Soviet Continuation War; remake of 1955 film The Unknown Soldier. Based on the 1954 novel by Väinö Linna.
1985	Romania	Us, The Frontline (The Last Assault)	Noi, cei din linia întâi	Sergiu Nicolaescu	Romanians fighting on the Western Front and in Hungary
1985	Philippines	Virgin Forest		Peque Gallaga	Uro Q. Dela Cruz (as Rosauro Q. de la Cruz) & T.E. Pagaspas
1986	Netherlands	The Assault	De Aanslag	Fons Rademakers	Drama based on Harry Mulisch novel. Family killed by Germans as retribution for Dutch Resistance assassination
1986	Poland	Crumbs of War	Okruchy wojny	Andrzej Barszczyński, Jan Chodkiewicz	Polish Resistance
1986	Australia	Death of a Soldier	Leonski	Philippe Mora	Based on the life, capture and trail of American serial killer Eddie Leonski
1986	United States	Every Time We Say Goodbye		Moshé Mizrahi	American RAF pilot in Jerusalem has romance with a Jewish girl
1986	Philippines	It's Night Time, Commander	Gabi Na, Kumander	Pepe Marcos	Rene Villanueva, Jose N. Carreon (as Jose Carreon) & Bienvenido Bacalso
1986	Poland; Switzerland	The Lullabye	Kołysanka (in Polish)	Efraim Sevela	Holocaust in Poland
1986	Japan	The Sea and Poison	Umi to dokuyaku (海と毒薬)	Kei Kumai	Captured US pilots held by the Japanese during the Pacific War
1986	Netherlands	Shadow of Victory	In de schaduw van de overwinning	Ate de Jong	Dutch Resistance
1987	France	Au Revoir Les Enfants (Goodbye Children)	Au revoir les enfants	Louis Malle	Jewish boys given shelter and new identity at Catholic boarding school in Vichy France
1987	Philippines	Balweg, the Rebel Priest	Balweg	Butch Perez (as Antonio Perez)	Biographical film inspired by the life of Catholic priest turned communist rebel Conrado Balweg
1987	Argentina; Czechoslovakia	Beneath the World	Debajo del Mundo	Beda Docampo Feijóo	A Jewish family is compelled to live underground during the Nazi occupation of Poland (based on actual events)
1987	United States; Yugoslavia	The Dirty Dozen: The Deadly Mission (Dirty Dozen 3) (TV)		Lee H. Katzin	Allied convicts trained for "do or die" mission in France
1987	United States	Empire of the Sun		Steven Spielberg	Allied prisoners in Shanghai Japanese internment camp
1987	United Kingdom; Yugoslavia	Escape from Sobibor (TV)		Jack Gold	Sobibor Uprising during Holocaust
1987	United Kingdom	Hope and Glory		John Boorman	A nine-year-old boy growing up in London during The Blitz
1987	United States; United Kingdom; Yugoslavia	The Misfit Brigade (Wheels of Terror)		Gordon Hessler	Panzer unit on Eastern Front
1988	Poland; United States	And the Violins Stopped Playing	I skrzypce przestały grać	Alexander Ramati	Romani people forced to flee from Nazis at height of Romani Holocaust
1988	United States	Biloxi Blues		Mike Nichols	Comedy based on the Neil Simon play. US Army basic training in Biloxi, Mississippi
1988	Senegal	Camp de Thiaroye	Camp de Thiaroye	Ousmane Sembène; Thierno Faty Sow	Thiaroye massacre of repatriated French West African veterans by French forces
1988	Poland	Cornflower Blue	Kornblumenblau (in German)	Leszek Wosiewicz	Polish musician surviving in Auschwitz-Birkenau because of accordion talent
1988	United States; Yugoslavia; Italy	The Dirty Dozen: The Fatal Mission (Dirty Dozen 4) (TV)		Lee H. Katzin	Allied convicts trained for "do or die" mission to halt formation of Fourth Reich in Macedonia
1988	China	Evening Bell	Wǎn zhōng (晚钟)	Wu Ziniu	Immediate aftermath of Sino-Japanese War in China
1988	United States	Farewell to the King		John Milius	Anti-Japanese resistance on Borneo
1988	Australia	Fragments of War: The Story of Damien Parer (TV)		John Duigan	Australian war photographer Damien Parer
1988	Japan	Grave of the Fireflies	Hotaru no Haka (火垂るの墓)	Isao Takahata	Anime. Firebombing of Kobe and survival on Japan homefront
1988	Canada	Mackenzie King and the Zombie Army (The King Chronicle, Part 3) (TV)		Donald Brittain	Drama. Canadian PM Mackenzie King and the Conscription Crisis of 1944
1988	Hong Kong	Men Behind the Sun	Hēi tài yáng 731 (黑太阳731)	Mou Tun Fei	Unit 731 and Japanese human experimentation
1988	Poland; Soviet Union	Passage	Przeprawa (in Polish)	Wiktor Turow	Polish Resistance, Soviet partisans, and Operation Sturmwind, 1944
1988	China	Red Sorghum	Hóng gāoliáng (红高粱)	Zhang Yimou	Woman working at kaoliang wine distillery during Sino-Japanese War
1988	United Kingdom	Return from the River Kwai		Andrew V. McLaglen	Burma Railway and British POWs force-marched from Thailand to Japan
1988	Italy; United States; Spain	Running Away (TV miniseries)	La ciociara	Dino Risi	Drama. Italian mother and daughter raped by French Expeditionary Corps troops (Marocchinate)
1988	Netherlands; United Kingdom	Shadow Man (Shadowman)	Schaduwman	Piotr Andrejew	Polish-Jewish refugee in hiding during German occupation of Amsterdam
1988	United States	The Tenth Man (TV)		Jack Gold	French advocate imprisoned and condemned to death during German occupation of France. Based on Graham Greene novel
1988	Japan	Tomorrow	Míngrì (明日)	Kazuo Kuroki	Atomic bombings of Hiroshima and Nagasaki
1988	United States	War and Remembrance (TV miniseries)		Dan Curtis	Saga of family and events after Pearl Harbor; sequel to Winds of War (TV miniseries). Based on novel by Herman Wouk
1989	United Kingdom	And a Nightingale Sang (TV)		Jack Rosenthal	Wartime romance for a woman from a working-class Newcastle family. Based on C.P. Taylor play
1989	Japan	Black Rain	Kuroi ame (黒い雨)	Shohei Imamura	Aftermath of atomic bombing of Hiroshima
1989	Canada	Bye Bye Blues		Anne Wheeler	Romance/Music drama. Woman joins jazz band on Canadian homefront
1989	United Kingdom	The Last Warrior (Coastwatcher)		Martin Wragge	Allied coastwatcher on remote island with Japanese warship at anchor for repairs
1989	Philippines	Comfort Women: A Cry for Justice		Celso Ad. Castillo	Filipina comfort women and Japanese occupation of the Philippines.
1989	United States	Fat Man and Little Boy		Roland Joffé	Allied Manhattan Project to develop the first nuclear weapons
1989	Japan	Harimau	Harimau (ハリマオ)	Ben Wada	The story of Japanese secret agent Tani Yutaka, known as "Harimau" (Malay word for "Tiger")
1989	Soviet Union; East Germany; Czechoslovakia; United States	Stalingrad	Stalingrad (Сталинград) (in Russian)	Yuri Ozerov	Battle for Stalingrad
1989	United States	Triumph of the Spirit		Robert M. Young	Story of boxer Salamo Arouch forced to fight fellow POWs by SS guards
1989	Poland	Virtuti	Virtuti	Jacek Butrymowicz	Polish Campaign, 1939
1989	Finland	The Winter War	Talvisota	Pekka Parikka	Winter War between Finland and the Soviet Union in late 1939. Based on the 1984 novel by Antti Tuuri.

== See also ==
- List of World War II short films
- List of World War II documentary films
- List of Allied propaganda films of World War II
- List of Holocaust films
- List of films based on war books – includes World War II section
- List of partisan films – films about World War II in Yugoslavia

Honorable mentions

- Buona Sera, Mrs. Campbell (1968) – Italian girl with 3 fathers, all US Army
- The Producers (1968) – Broadway Nazi musical
- Zelig (1983) – Woody Allen as a Nazi Brownshirt

== Sources ==
- Leyda, Jay. Kino: A History of the Russian and Soviet Film – A study of the development of Russian cinema, from 1896 to the present. London: George Allen & Unwin, 1960. Princeton, New Jersey: Princeton University Press, 3rd edition, 1983. 513 pp. ISBN 0-691-00346-7
