= The Unknown (1964 film) =

1964 Polish film by Witold Lesiewicz

- Directed by: Witold Lesiewicz
- Written by: Józef Hen
- Starring: Leszek Herdegen; Bronislaw Pawlik; Stanisław Zaczyk
- Cinematography: Czeslaw Swirta
- Edited by: Maria Orlowska
- Music by: Tadeusz Baird
- Distributed by: Centrala Wynajmu Filmów
- Release date: October 13, 1964
- Running time: 97 minutes
- Country: Poland
- Language: Polish

The Unknown (Polish: Nieznany) is a 1964 Polish film, directed by Witold Lesiewicz. A war film set in a Soviet labour camp. The action of the film takes place in 1943. Two Poles escape from the Soviet labor camp. Their goal is to get to the Polish Army in position over the Oka River. Following the Battle of Lenino, they finally reach Poland.

== Cast ==
- Leszek Herdegen as Bogdan Sowik
- Bronislaw Pawlik as Stanislaw Krawczyk
- Boleslaw Plotnicki as Rysiewicz
- Stanislaw Zaczyk as Lieutenant Nagraba
- Maria Ciesielska as Ludka
- Zofia Niwinska as Major's Wife

== See also ==
- List of World War II films (1950–1989)
