= Alicja Bobrowska =

Polish model and actress (1936–2025)

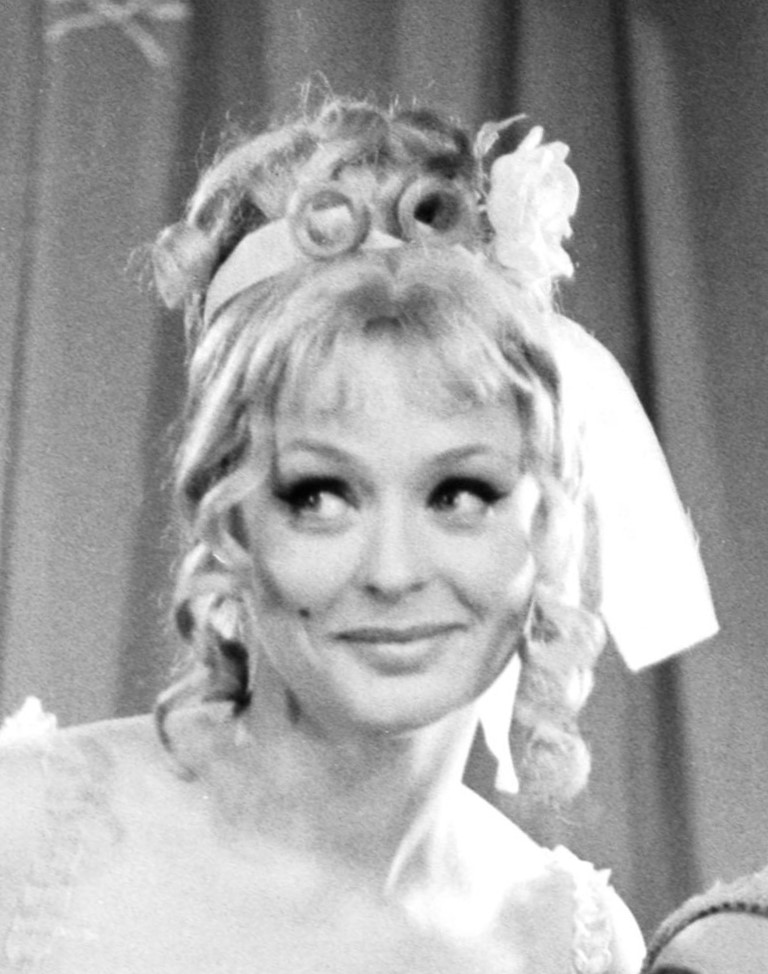
- Bobrwoska during a 1958 show at the National Theatre, Warsaw, Poland
- Born: 8 January 1936; Volodymyr, Second Polish Republic
- Died: 13 January 2025 (aged 89); Los Angeles, California, United States
- Education: AST National Academy of Theatre Arts in Kraków
- Height: 1.68 m (5 ft 6 in)
- Spouse: Stanislaw Zaczyk
- Children: 1

Alicja Bobrowska (8 January 1936 – 13 January 2025) was a Polish actress, television presenter and artist. She won the Miss Polonia beauty pageant in 1957.

== Biography ==
Bobrowska was born on 8 January 1936 in Volodymyr, Malopolskie (an area disputed by the Second Polish Republic, Bolshevist Russia, and the Ukrainian People's Republic, now part of Ukraine). Her baptism was recorded in the church books "affiliation" column as "Polish emigrant". She lived with her family in Gdańsk, Poland, after World War II.

Bobrowska's mother had nursing qualifications and her family wanted her to pursue a medical career. However, she wanted a career in the arts. She studied at the AST National Academy of Theatre Arts in Kraków. While studying, Bobrowska worked as a model for local department stores. In 1956, she was voted the "nicest student."

Bobrowska won the Miss Polonia beauty pageant in 1957, held at the Gdańsk Shipyard, becoming the first post-war winner of the competition. Her crown was modelled on the medieval crown of Queen Jadwiga of Poland. The jurors included Tymoteusz Ortym [pl], Lopek Krukowski and Magdalena Samozwaniec.

Bobrowska was then invited to compete at Miss Universe, to be held that year in Long Beach, California, United States, but her passport application was rejected. She sent a telegram to the Polish Prime Minister, Józef Cyrankiewicz, and a few days later she was granted a passport. While travelling to America, the suitcase containing her ball gown was lost, but she was lent a dress by a Jewish woman of Polish origin who ran a boutique in Beverly Hills.

At Miss Universe 1958, Bobrowska wore folk costume, placed 5th overall, won a cup and prize of $1,600 and won an honourable mention and first place for the best speech about her home country. A copy of the speech and the cup she was awarded are now held in the collection of the Theatre Museum, Warsaw. After the pageant, she was offered a deal with the cosmetics brand Max Factor and a chance to star in Paramount Pictures films alongside Marlon Brando, but turned down the offers to return to Poland due to her "love for her homeland."

In Poland, Bobrowska became an actress, performing at theatres in Kraków and Warsaw. She married Polish actor Stanisław Zaczyk and they had a son together. While raising her son, Bobrowska performed roles in films, including in the Polish film Malzenstwo z rozsadku (Marriage of Convenience, 1967) by Stanisław Bareja and in the Egyptian film Loghat El Hob (1974) by Zoheir Bakir and appeared on the East German TV series Polizeiruf 110. She also worked as a television presented for public service broadcaster Telewizja Polska.

In 1981, Bobrowska emigrated to California, United States, where she retrained as a nurse and volunteered to care for children who came from Poland for heart surgery. She also produced contemporary paintings and sculptures, which were shown locally and at galleries in Chicago and New York City, and participated in Polish expatriate community events as a member of the Helena Modrzejewska Art and Club. In 2004, Bobrowska returned to Poland as a guest at Miss Polonia.

Bobrowska died on 13 January 2025 in Los Angeles, California, United States, aged 89. A funeral mass was held at the Church of Our Lady of Jasna Góra in Los Angeles and her body was repatriated to Gdańsk, Poland, for burial in the family plot.
