= Leszek Herdegen =

Polish actor (1929–1980)

- Born: 28 May 1929; Poznań, Second Polish Republic
- Died: 15 February 1980 (aged 50); Toruń, Poland
- Burial place: Cmentarz Rakowicki in Kraków, Poland
- Citizenship: Polish
- Occupation: Actor
- Years active: 1957–1980

Leszek Herdegen (28 May 1929 – 15 January 1980) was a Polish actor. He appeared in more than 20 films and television shows between 1957 and 1980.

== Selected filmography ==
- Rok pierwszy (1960)
- Kwiecień (1961)
- Nieznany (1964)
- Pharaoh (1965)
- Stawka większa niż życie (1967)
- Copernicus (1973)
