= Rok pierwszy =

1960 film

- Directed by: Witold Lesiewicz
- Written by: Aleksander Ścibor-Rylski
- Starring: Stanisław Zaczyk
- Release date: 22 September 1960
- Running time: 84 minutes
- Country: Poland
- Language: Polish

Rok pierwszy is a 1960 Polish drama film directed by Witold Lesiewicz.

== Cast ==
- Stanisław Zaczyk as sierzant Lukasz Otryna
- Leszek Herdegen as kapral Józef Dunajec
- Aleksandra Śląska as Dorota
