= The Ashes (film) =

1965 Polish film

- Directed by: Andrzej Wajda
- Written by: Aleksander Ścibor-Rylski; Stefan Żeromski
- Starring: Daniel Olbrychski
- Cinematography: Jerzy Lipman
- Edited by: Halina Nawrocka
- Release date: 25 September 1965
- Running time: 234 minutes
- Country: Poland
- Language: Polish
- Box office: 6 million tickets

The Ashes (Polish: Popioły) is a 1965 Polish historical drama film directed by Andrzej Wajda, referencing the classic Stefan Żeromski epic novel of Polish Literature of the same name. It was entered into the 1966 Cannes Film Festival. It sold about 6 million tickets in Poland, becoming one of the highest-grossing Polish films of all time.

== Cast ==
- Daniel Olbrychski – Rafał Olbromski
- Bogusław Kierc – Krzysztof Cedro
- Piotr Wysocki – Jan Gintułt
- Beata Tyszkiewicz – Princess Elżbieta
- Pola Raksa – Helena de With
- Władysław Hańcza – Rafal's Father
- Jan Świderski – General Sokolnicki
- Jan Koecher – General de With
- Zbigniew Sawan – Krzysztof's Father
- Józef Duriasz – Piotr Olbromski
- Zbigniew Józefowicz – Michcik
- Janusz Zakrzeński – Napoleon Bonaparte
- Józef Nalberczak – Soldier Wanderer
- Stanisław Zaczyk – Józef Poniatowski
- Zofia Saretok – Helena's Aunt
- Krzysztof Litwin – Officer
- Arkadiusz Bazak – Officer
- Tomasz Zaliwski – Officer
- Stanisław Mikulski – Polish Soldier

== Ethical controversy ==
To film one of the scenes, Andrzej Wajda decided to push a living horse off a cliff(that was "saved" from a slaughterhouse prior to filming), which resulted in animal's brutal death. This director's move sparked a backlash from fans and several communities, starting a debate around the extremes of artistic expression.

Years later, Wajda's at the time assistant - Andrzej Żuławski, came forward to defend the scene, stating that the horse was going to die anyways (in the slaughterhouse) and was drugged by the crew so much, that it didn't know what was happening around it.
