= Stanisław Zaczyk =

Polish actor

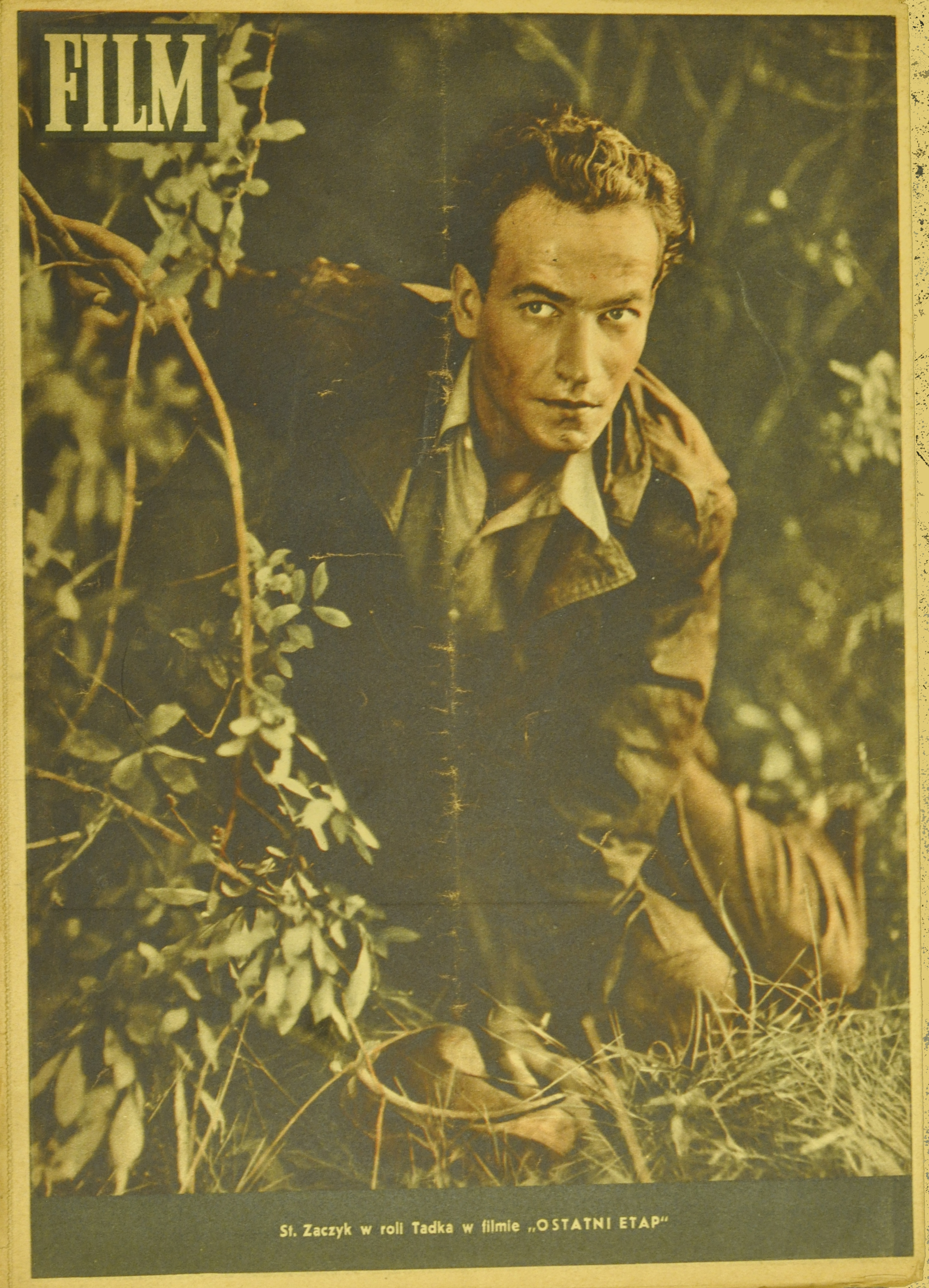
- Stanisław Zaczyk, 1948
- Born: September 26, 1923; Moscow, Russian Empire
- Died: April 6, 1985 (aged 61); Warsaw, Poland
- Occupation: actor
- Years active: 1945–1985
- Spouse: Alicja Bobrowska

Stanisław Zaczyk (26 September 1923 – 6 April 1985) was a Polish theatre and film actor. He was awarded the Polonia Restituta in 1969.

== Biography ==
Zaczyk was born in Nowy Sącz, Poland. In 1945, he graduated from the Theatre Studio near The Old Theatre, Kraków. In the same year, he made his acting debut in Pierre Corneille's Le Cid portraying a page in the stages of The Old Theatre. From 1946 through 1950, he performed on stages in Jelenia Góra and Wrocław. He then returned to Kraków and became an actor at the Juliusz Słowacki Theatre. Since 1960, Zaczyk acted on Warsaw theatre stages such as Narodowy Theatre (1960–1963, 1965–1968), The Polish Theatre (1963–1965), Ataneum Theatre (1969–1974), and the Powszechny Theatre (1974–1975). He made his film debut in 1945 in 2+2=4 directed by Antoni Bohdziewicz.

He died on 6 April 1985 in Warsaw, Poland.

== Selected theatre roles ==
- Page in Le Cid written by Pierre Corneille (1945)—A debut role

His notable roles in Juliusz Słowacki Theatre, Kraków include:

- Poet in The Wedding written by Stanisław Wyspiański (1956)
- Konrad in Wyzwolenie written by Wyspiański (1957)
- Tzar in Kordian written by Juliusz Słowacki (1957)
- Szczęsny in Horsztyński written by Słowacki (1959).

His notable roles in Warsaw theatres include:

- Ivan in The Brothers Karamazov written by Fyodor Dostoevsky (1963)
- Senator in Dziady written by Adam Mickiewicz (1964)
- Stroop in Conversations with an Executioner written by Kazimierz Moczarski (1978)
- The Mayor in An Enemy of the People written by Henrik Ibsen (1979).

== Selected filmography ==
- 2+2=4 directed by Antoni Bohdziewicz (1945)—A debut film role
- The Last Stage directed by Wanda Jakubowska (1948)
- Rok pierwszy directed by Witold Lesiewicz (1960)
- Mansarda directed by Konrad Nałęcki (1963)
- Popioły directed by Andrzej Wajda (1965)
- Zaklęte rewiry directed by Janusz Majewski (1975)
- Romans Teresy Hennert directed by Ignacy Gogolewski (1978)
- Paciorki jednego różańca directed by Kazimierz Kutz (1980)

== Honours and awards ==
- Commander's Cross of the Order of Polonia Restituta (1979; previously awarded the Knight's Cross, 1969)
- Gold Cross of Merit (1956)
- Medal of the 10th anniversary of the Polish People's Republic (1955)
- Badge of Merit in Culture (1968)
