= The Passage (1979 film) =

- Directed by: J. Lee Thompson
- Written by: Bruce Nicolaysen
- Based on: novel Perilous Passage by Bruce Nicolaysen
- Produced by: Maurice Binder; Lester Goldsmith; John Quested
- Starring: Anthony Quinn; Malcolm McDowell; James Mason; Patricia Neal; Kay Lenz; Michael Lonsdale; Marcel Bozzuffi; Paul Clemens; Robert Rhys; Christopher Lee
- Music by: Michael J. Lewis
- Production company: Monday Films
- Distributed by: Hemdale Film Distribution; United Artists
- Release dates: 11 May 1979 (UK); 9 March 1979 (NYC); 7 September 1979 (MND)
- Running time: 98 minutes
- Country: United Kingdom
- Language: English
- Box office: $1.1 million (US)

The Passage is a 1979 British action-war film directed by J. Lee Thompson and starring Anthony Quinn, James Mason, Malcolm McDowell and Patricia Neal. The film is based upon the 1976 novel Perilous Passage by Bruce Nicolaysen, who also wrote the screenplay for the film.

== Plot ==
During World War II, a Basque farmer is asked by the French resistance to help a fleeing scientist and his family escape across the Pyrenees Mountains to safety in neutral Spain. On his trail are a group of Germans, led by a sadistic SS officer.

== Cast ==
- Anthony Quinn as The Basque
- James Mason as Professor John Bergson
- Malcolm McDowell as Capt. Von Berkow
- Patricia Neal as Mrs. Ariel Bergson
- Kay Lenz as Leah Bergson
- Christopher Lee as The Gypsy
- Michael Lonsdale as Alain Renoudot
- Marcel Bozzuffi as Perea
- Paul Clemens as Paul Bergson
- Peter Arne as Guide
- Neville Jason as Lt. Reinke
- Robert Brown as Major
- Jim Broadbent as German Soldier (uncredited)

== Production ==
The film was based on the novel Perilous Passage, which was published in 1977. The Los Angeles Times said that it "isn't really that good". The New York Times said it was "very well done" with a "general air of excitement, suspense and even horror".

One of the producers was Maurice Binder, who was best known for doing the title sequences for James Bond movies.

The film was shot on location in the Pyrenees. Malcolm McDowell had to perform a nude scene with Kay Lenz on his first day of shooting. In order to lighten the atmosphere he wore underpants with a swastika on it; J. Lee Thompson liked the idea so much he made it part of McDowell's character. McDowell says that Kay Lenz "wasn't happy" to do her nude scene.

McDowell later called the movie "utter rubbish. I took it only because I needed money to pay my taxes. Making it depressed me terribly."

== Reviews ==
As he made this movie in Europe and England, James Mason predicted to co-star Kay Lenz that people do not like movies in snow and this film would bomb miserably after they were finished making it. He was right: the film opened to bad box office worldwide and, in critics' eyes, was a disaster in contrast to J. Lee Thompson's 1961 successful The Guns of Navarone.

The Los Angeles Times' Kevin Thomas said "we've seen it all so many times before."

The Globe and Mail said: "The director of The Passage is J. Lee Thompson, possibly the worst experienced director in the world today. The cinematographer is Mike Reed, whose work is appalling: the dominant color is khaki and every scene is either under- or overexposed. The writer is Bruce Nicolaysen, who based the movie on his novel Perilous Passage. They should all be deeply ashamed and should do penance by crossing the Pyrenees on their knees. Too cruel? Fine. They can sit through every movie Anthony Quinn ever made. Twice."

Filmink magazine compared the depiction of rape in this movie unfavourably with the way it was dealt with in J. Lee Thompson's Cape Fear which they said "is a terrifying examination of that crime" while in The Passage "the rape of a woman (Kay Lenz) at the hands of an SS Officer (Malcolm McDowell) is treated in an exploitative, camp way (McDowell wears underpants with a swastika on them, Lenz is shown topless in a shower)… it seems like a movie directed by an entirely different person."

== See also ==
- List of World War II films (1950–1989)
