= Aleksander Ścibor-Rylski =

Polish screenwriter

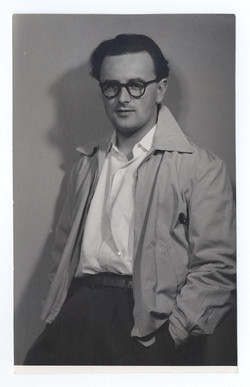
- Born: 16 March 1928; Grudziądz, Poland
- Died: 3 April 1983 (aged 55); Warsaw, Poland
- Occupations: Screenwriter; Film director
- Years active: 1951–1981

Aleksander Ścibor-Rylski (16 March 1928 – 3 April 1983) was a Polish screenwriter and film director. He wrote for more than 25 films between 1951 and 1981. He was born to an aristocratic family of Clan Ostoja.

== Selected filmography ==
- Rok pierwszy (1960)
- The Impossible Goodbye (1962)
- Black Wings (1963)
- The Ashes (1965)
- Man of Marble (1976)
- Dagny (1977)
- The Doll (1977)
- Man of Iron (1981)

== See also ==
- Zbigniew Ścibor-Rylski
- Clan Ostoja
- Ostoja coat of arms
