= Jerzy Passendorfer =

Polish film director and politician

Jerzy Passendorfer (April 8, 1923 in Wilno – February 20, 2003 in Skolimów, near Warsaw, Poland) was a Polish film director, specialising in films about the German occupation of Poland in World War II, and member of parliament.

== Education and Career ==
Passendorfer graduated from the Film and TV School of the Academy of Performing Arts in Prague in 1951, and went on to become the leading exponent of the popular "national combatant" genre in the 1960s. As well as many films he directed the popular TV serial Janosik.

Passendorfer served in the Sejm, the lower house of the Polish parliament, from 1993 to 1997 on the Democratic Left Alliance list.

== Filmography ==
- Treasure of Captain Martens (1957) by novel of Janusz Meissner
- Signals (1959)
- Assassination (1959)
- The Return (1960)
- Judgment (1961) by novel of Jerzy Przeździecki
- Broken Bridge (1962) by novel of Roman Bratny
- Bathed in Fire (1963) by novel of Wojciech Żukrowski
- The Colors of the Fight (1964) by novel of Mieczysław Moczar
- Justice Sunday (1965)
- The Strong Hit (1966)
- Heading to Berlin (1968) by novel Wojciech Żukrowski
- The Day of the Purification (1969) by novel of Jerzy Przeździecki
- The Last Days (1969)
- Kill the Black Sheep (1971) by novel of Ryszard Kłyś
- Janosik (1974)
- Victory (1974)
- Seagulls (1986) by novel of Stanisław Goszczurny
