= Witold Lesiewicz =

Polish film director

- Born: 9 September 1922; Białystok, Podlaskie, Poland
- Died: 23 March 2012 (aged 89)
- Occupations: Film director, screenwriter
- Years active: 1954 – 2001

Witold Lesiewicz (9 September 1922 – 23 March 2012) was a Polish film director and screenwriter. He directed 24 films between 1949 and 1979. He completed the work on the 1963 film Passenger after the death of director Andrzej Munk.

== Selected filmography ==
- Deserter (1958)
- Rok pierwszy (1960)
- Kwiecień (1961)
- Passenger (1963)
- Nieznany (1964)
- Bolesław Śmiały (1971)
- Doctor Murek (1979)
