= Deadvlei =

Clay pan in the Namib-Naukluft Park in Namibia

Coordinates: 24°45′35″S 15°17′31″E

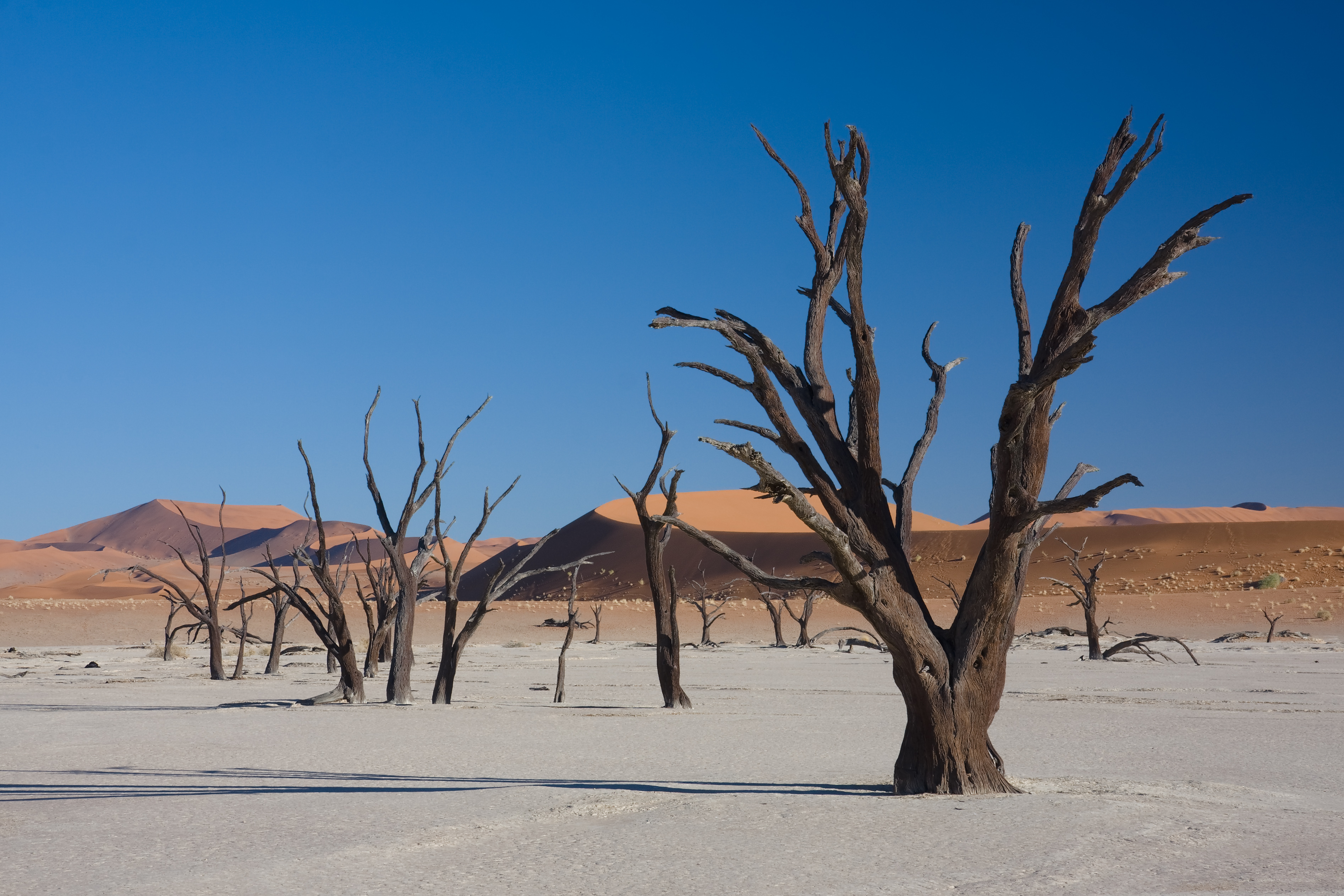
Dead Vachellia erioloba in Deadvlei

Deadvlei is a white clay pan located near the more famous salt pan of Sossusvlei, in a valley between the dunes in the Namib-Naukluft Park in Namibia. Also written DeadVlei or Dead Vlei, its name means "dead marsh" (from English dead, and Afrikaans vlei, meaning lake or marsh). Its Afrikaans name is Dooie Vlei. Many Internet references erroneously translate its name as "dead valley"; a vlei is not a valley (which in Afrikaans is "vallei"). Nor is the site a valley; the pan is a desiccated vlei.

== History and description ==
The clay pan was formed after rainfall, when the Tsauchab river flooded, creating temporary shallow pools where the abundance of water allowed camel thorn trees to grow. When the climate changed, drought hit the area, and sand dunes encroached on the pan, which blocked the river from the area.

The trees died as there was no longer enough water to survive. However, some species of plants remain, such as salsola and clumps of nara, adapted to surviving off the morning mist and very rare rainfall. The remaining skeletons of the trees, which are believed to have died 600–700 years ago (ca. 1340–1430), are now black and scorched by the intense heat. Though not petrified, the wood has not decomposed because the area is so dry.

Dead Vlei has been claimed to be surrounded by the highest sand dunes in the world, the highest reaching 300–400 m (980–1,310 ft) (350 m (1,150 ft) on average) named "Big Daddy" or "Crazy Dune", resting on a sandstone terrace.

== In popular media ==
Feature films partly shot there include The Cell, The Fall, Ghajini and Ayan.

== Gallery ==
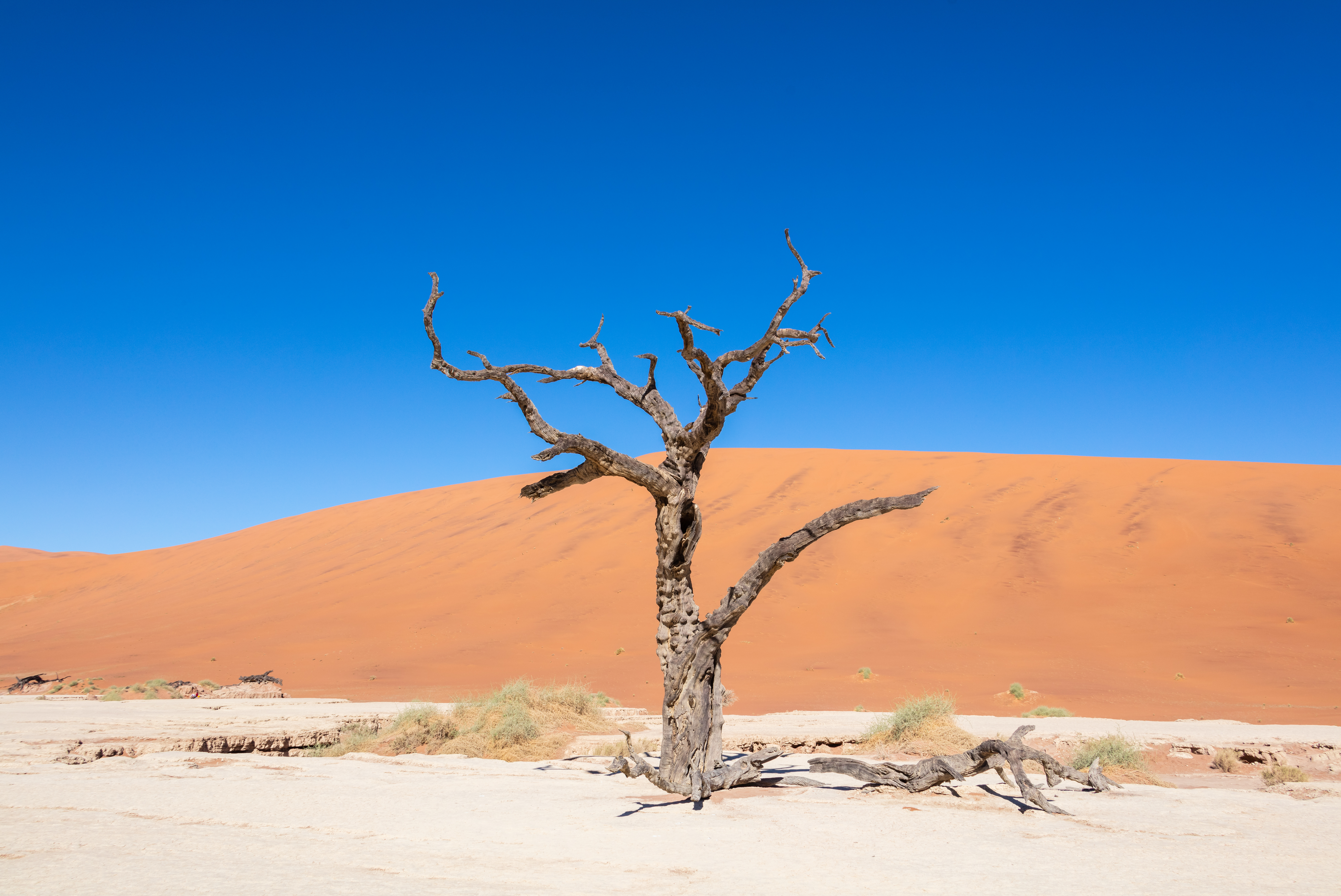
A dried-out camel thorn (Vachellia erioloba) in Deadvlei

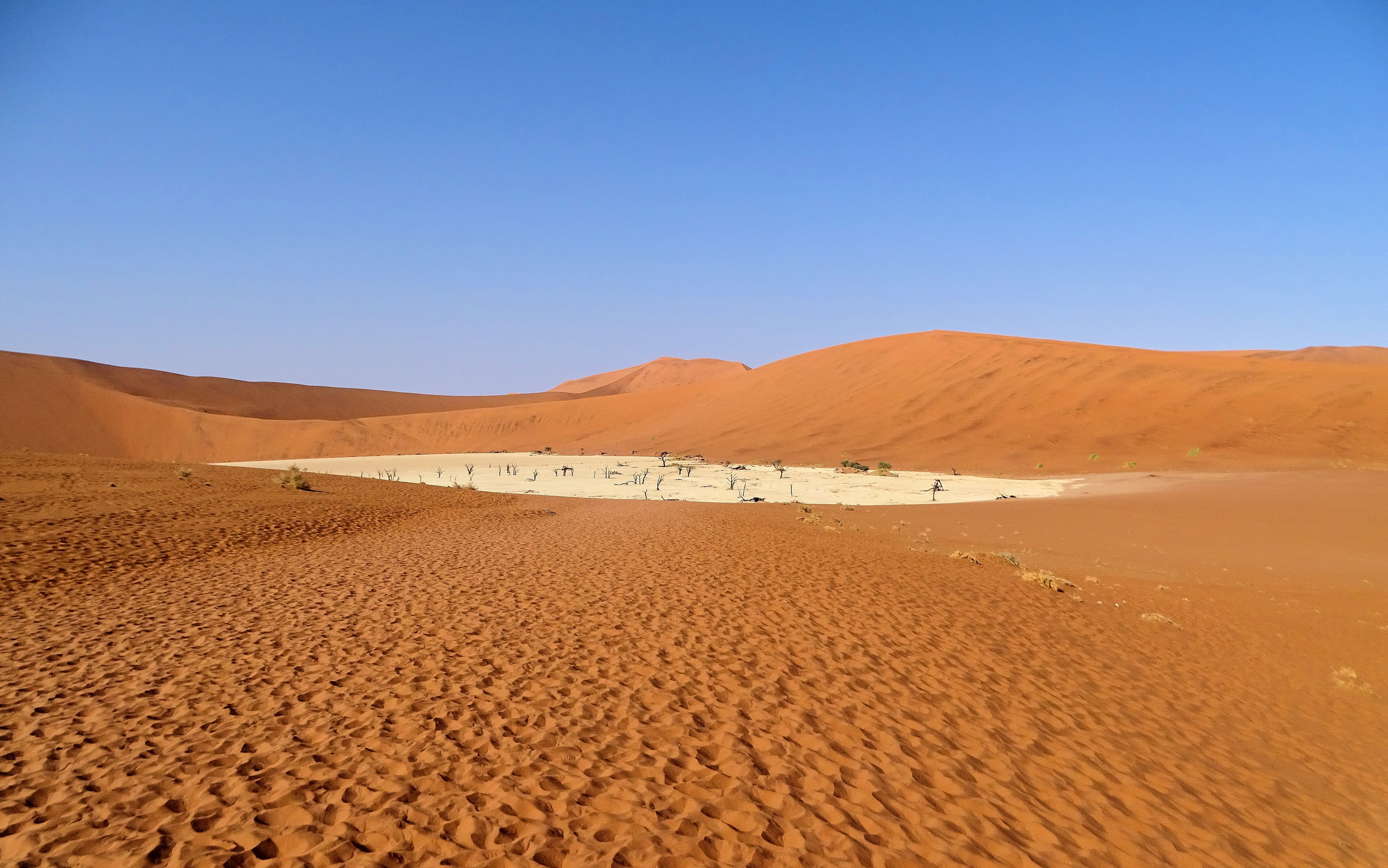
Deadvlei early in the morning before most visitors arrive

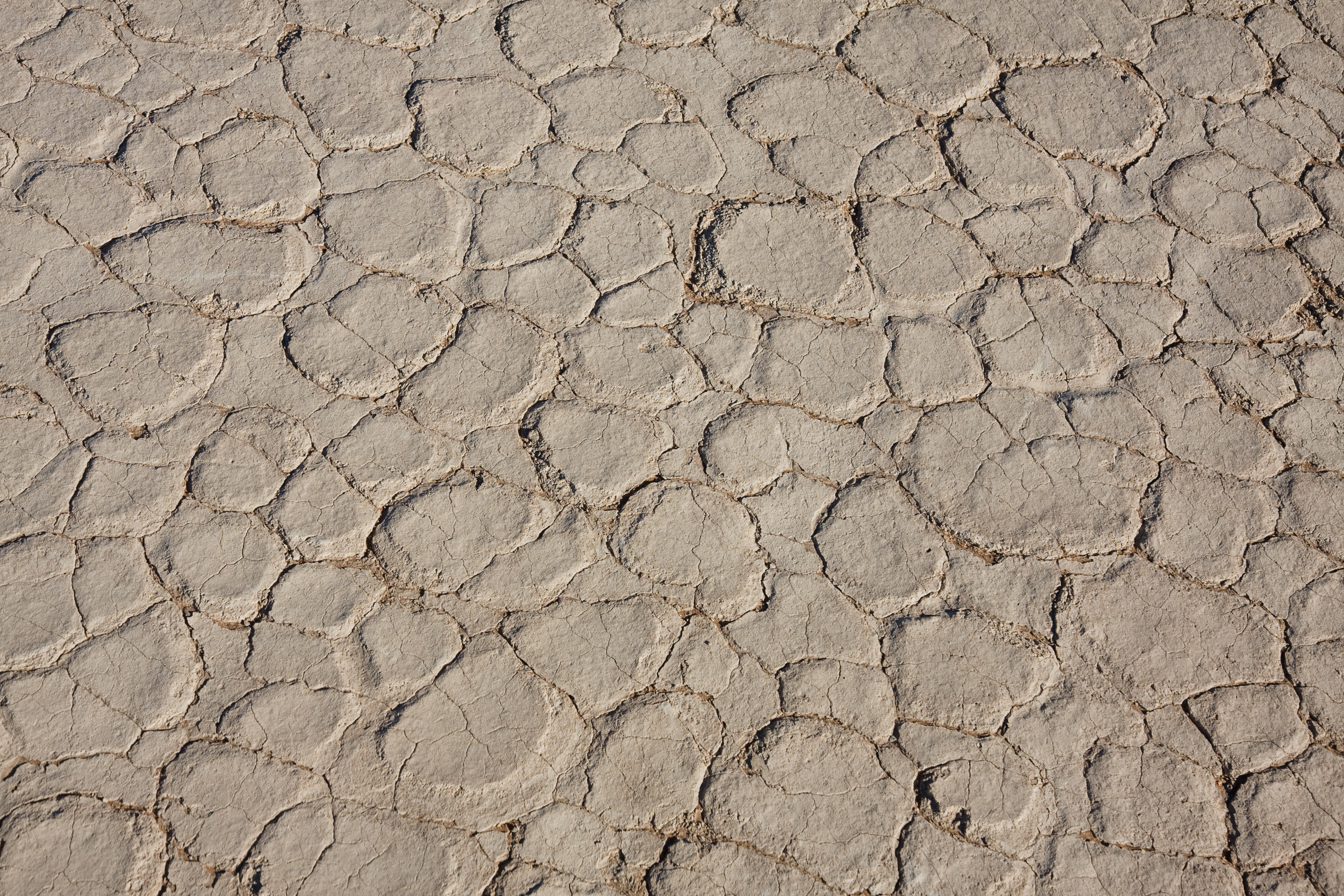
The parched ground in Deadvlei

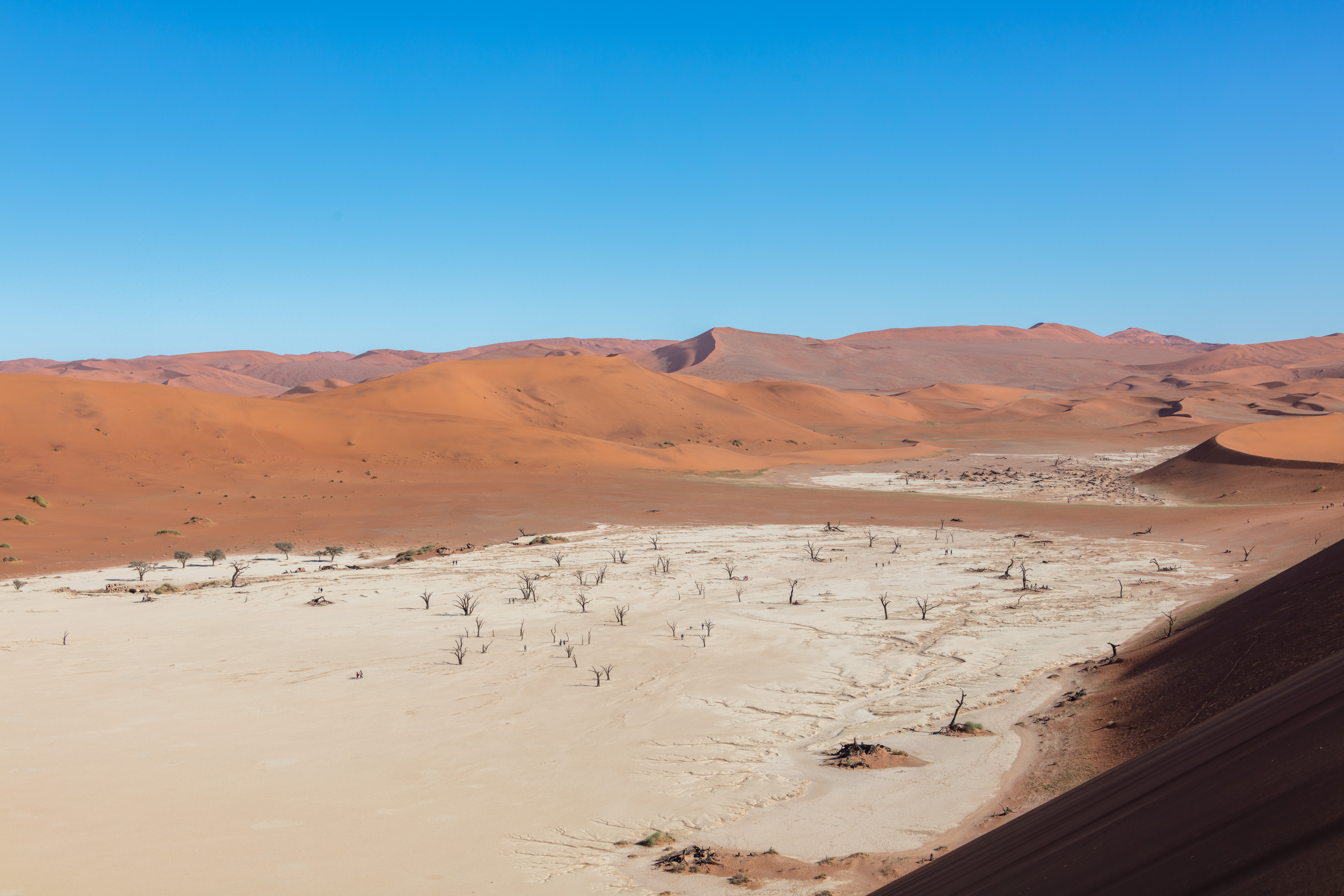
General view of Deadvlei

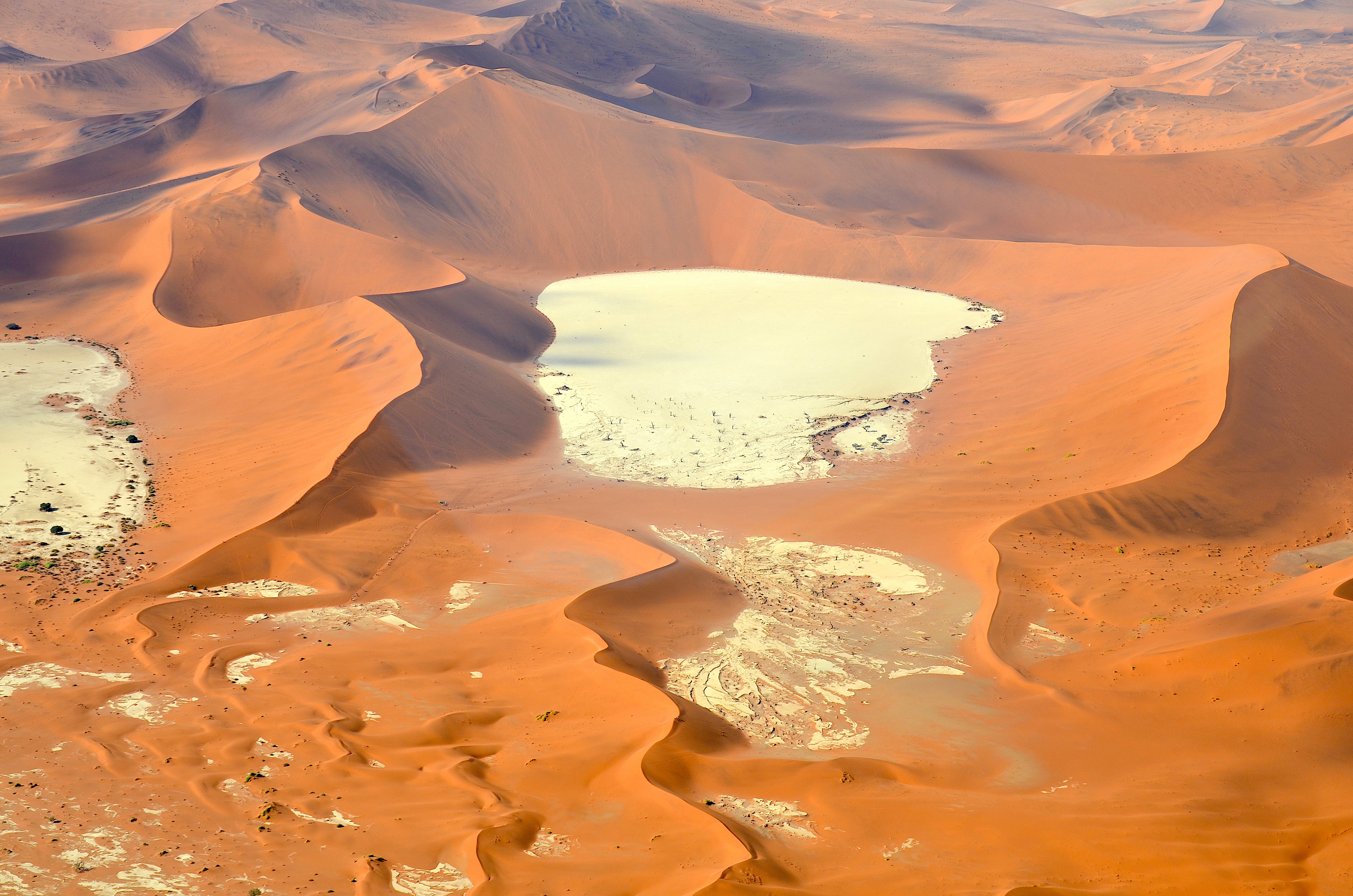
Aerial view of Deadvlei (2017)

Vachellia erioloba tree

An acacia in Dead Vlei

Acacia trees in Deadvlei

General view of Deadvlei

General view of Deadvlei

General view of Deadvlei

General view of Deadvlei

Road to Deadvlei

== Resources ==
- More information and photos of Deadvlei at sossusvlei.org
