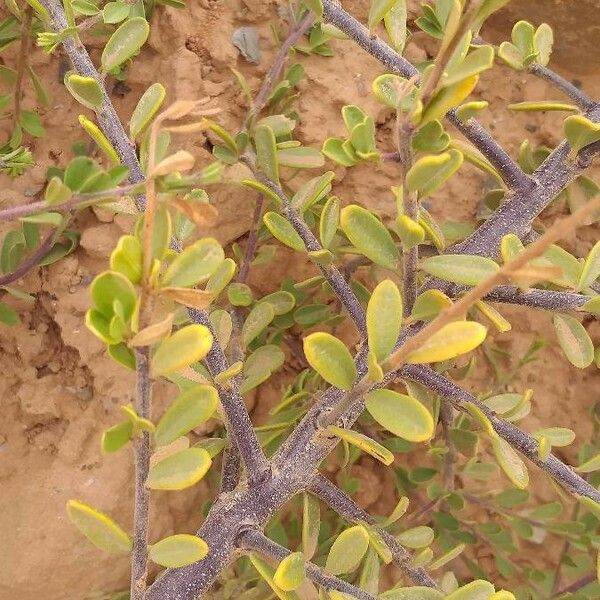

Conservation status
- Least Concern (IUCN 3.1)

Scientific classification
- Kingdom: Plantae
- Clade: Embryophytes
- Clade: Tracheophytes
- Clade: Angiosperms
- Clade: Eudicots
- Clade: Rosids
- Order: Brassicales
- Family: Capparaceae
- Genus: Maerua
- Species: M. crassifolia

Binomial name
- Maerua crassifolia Forssk.

= Maerua crassifolia =

Species of plant

Maerua crassifolia is a species of plant in the Capparaceae family. It is native to Africa, tropical Arabia, and Israel, but is disappearing from Egypt. Foliage from this plant is used as fodder for animals, especially camels, during the dry season in parts of Africa.

The plant grows commonly in Yemen, where it is called Meru. In the 18th century the plant's Arabic name Meru (مرو) was used as the source for the genus name Maerua. The 18th-century taxonomist was Peter Forsskål, who visited Yemen in the 1760s.

It is used as a common nutrition source in central Africa, where it is called jiga and made into soups and other dishes. It was part of the daily diet of the Kel Ewey tribe of the tuaregs in the Aïr Mountains as late as in the 1980s, who would mix the cooked leaves with goat milk. Maerua crassifolia was considered sacred to the ancient Egyptians.

== Distribution ==
Maerua crassifolia has been found growing along the Tsauchab river in Namibia at the following geo coordinates: 24°38'42.6"S 15°39'06.9"E.
