= Tsauchab =

River in central Namibia

Tsauchab River
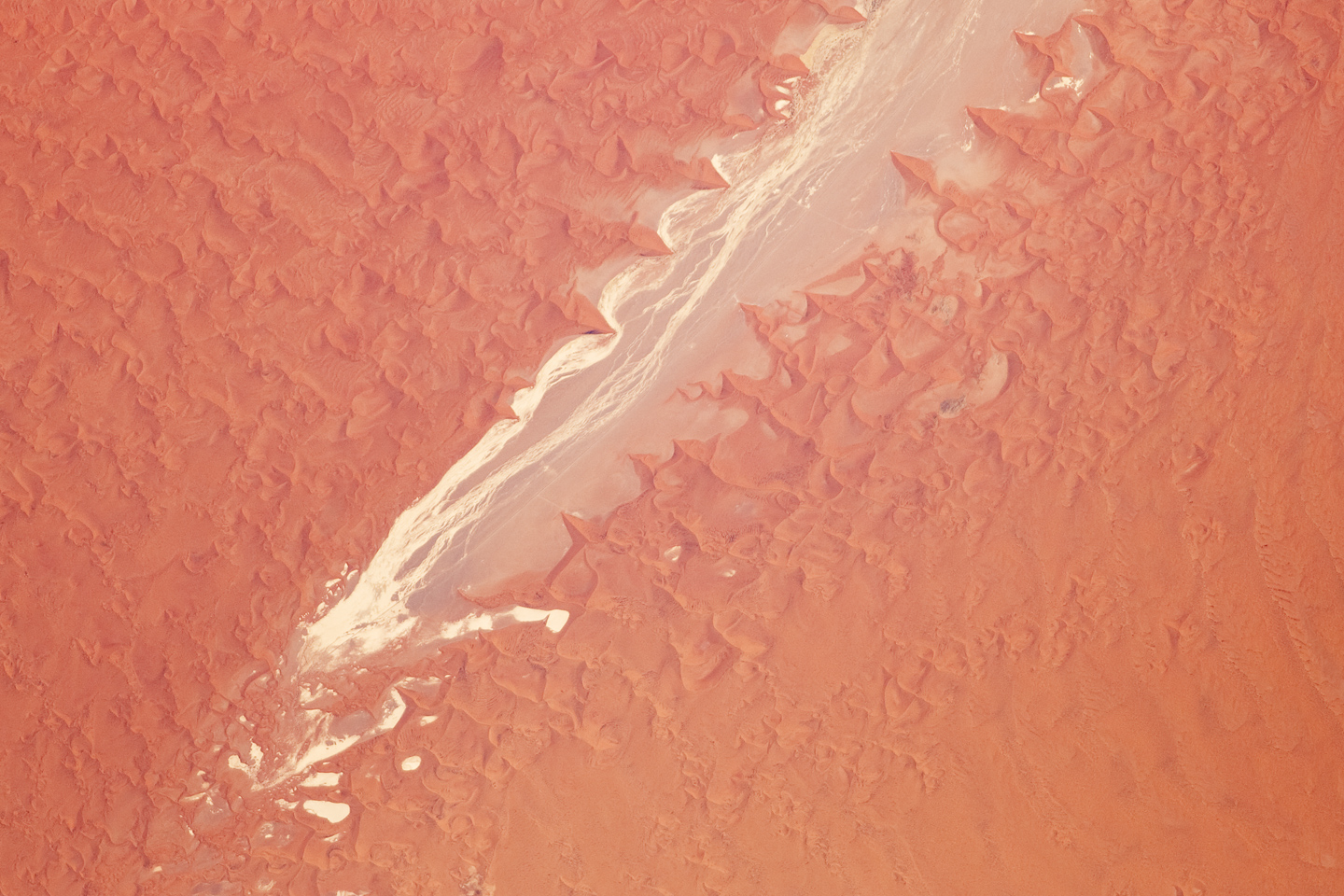
- The lower 45 kilometers of the Tsauchab River, taken from ISS

Physical characteristics
- Source: Naukluft Mountains
  - location: Hardap Region, Namibia
- Mouth: Sossusvlei
  - location: Namib
  - coordinates: 24°44′S 15°22′E
- Length: c.150 km (93 mi)
- Basin size: 4,000 km^{2} (1,500 sq mi)

Basin features
- Tributaries
  - left: Zebra River

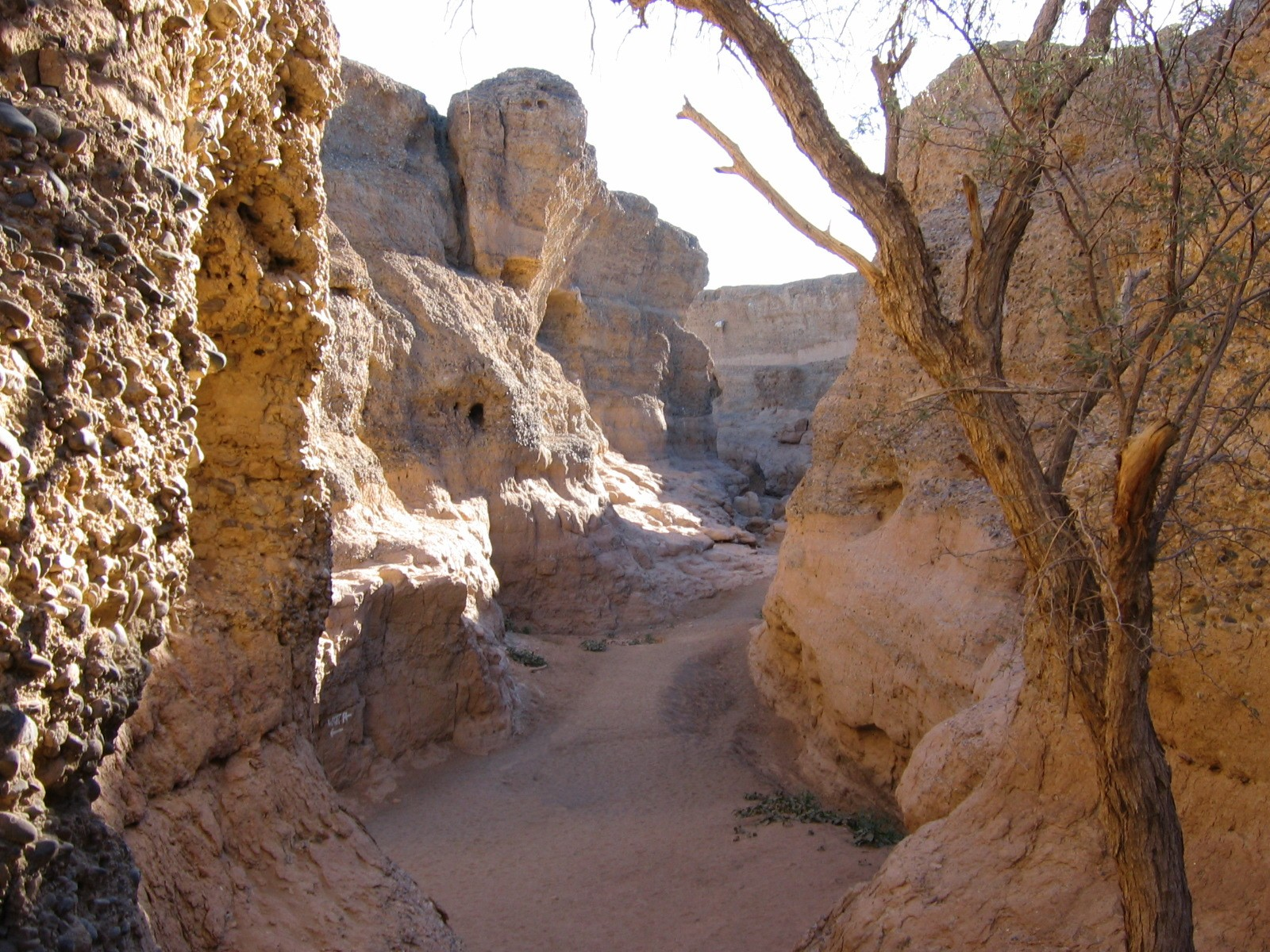
Sesriem Canyon, with the Tsauchab dry

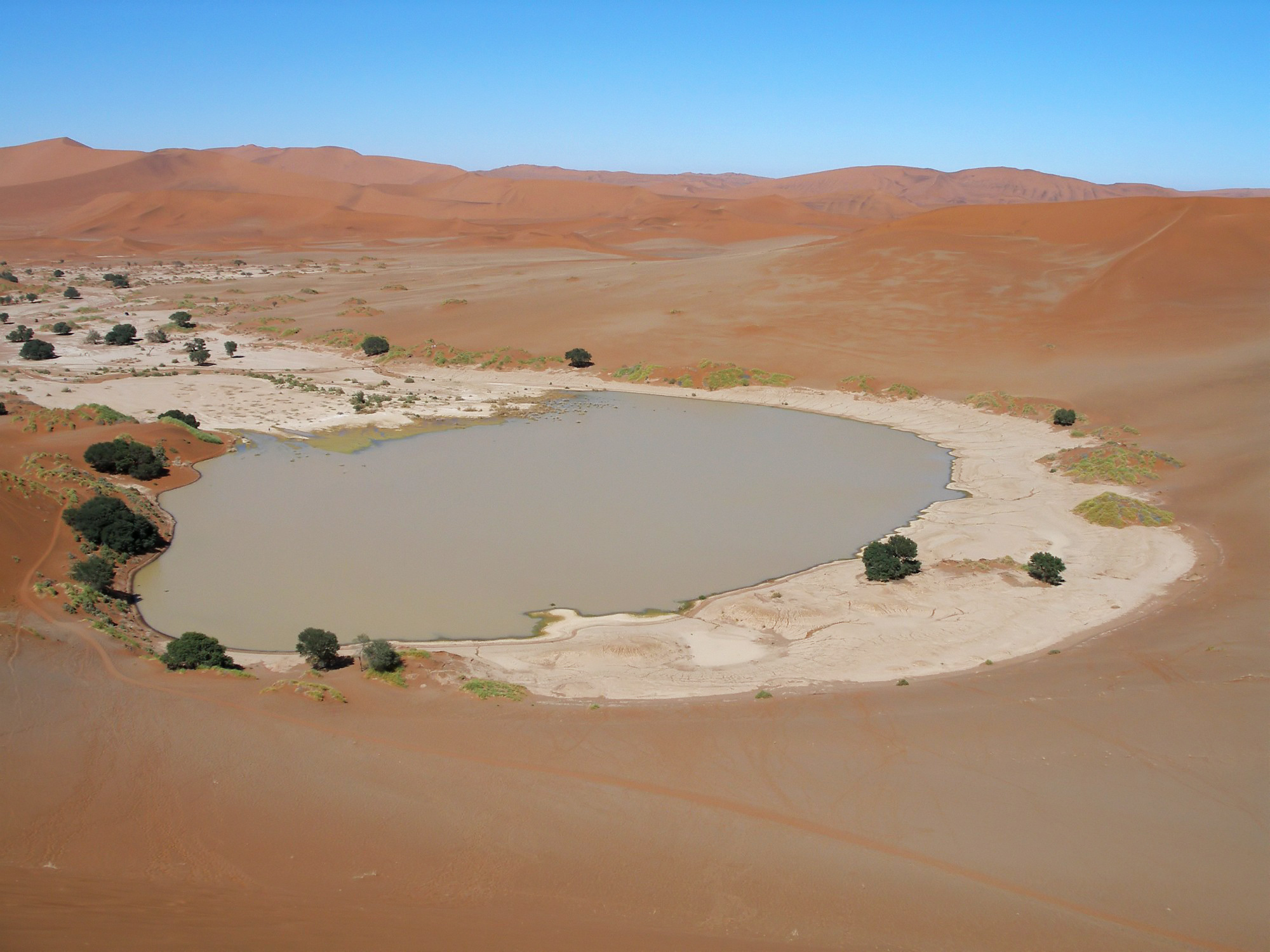
A lake formed on a portion of the Tsauchab in the Sossusvlei salt pan after rains

The Tsauchab is an ephemeral river in the Hardap Region of central Namibia. Its source is in the southern Naukluft Mountains, from where it flows westwards through the Namib-Naukluft National Park into Sossusvlei, an endorheic basin. The lower river has in the past had a slightly different courses and also formed two other basins, the Deadvlei and the Hiddenvlei.

The Tsauchab is approximately 150 km (93 mi) long, its catchment area (including its tributary, the Zebra River) is estimated to be between 4,000 and 4,431 km^{2} (1,711 sq mi). Since it is in the Namib Desert, the Tsauchab carries water only during the rare times when rain falls in the Naukluft Mountains and runs off, since it cannot seep into the soil fast enough (see flash flood). During these rains, the Tsauchab becomes a rapid-running, strong river within a matter of hours. As a result of the occasional rains, it has over the past two million years carved the Sesriem Canyon, a 1 km (0.62 mi) long and up to 30 m (98 ft) deep canyon in sedimentary rock. Past the canyon, the Tsauchab flattens and grows broader, and is surrounded by a riparian forest as it slopes towards the Sossusvlei salt pan. In the Sossusvlei area, the riparian forest consists of both the living trees including Maerua crassifolia and the remaining skeletons of dead trees.

Sossusvlei, Sesriem Canyon and the high sand dunes between the two are some of Namibia's major tourist attractions.
