= Vlei =

Shallow minor lake, often seasonal

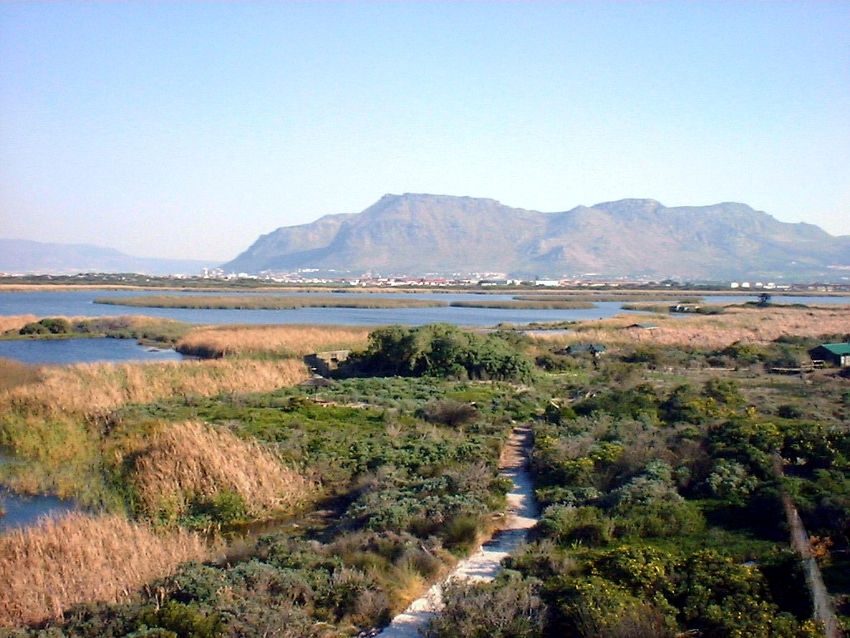
Rondevlei, near Cape Town

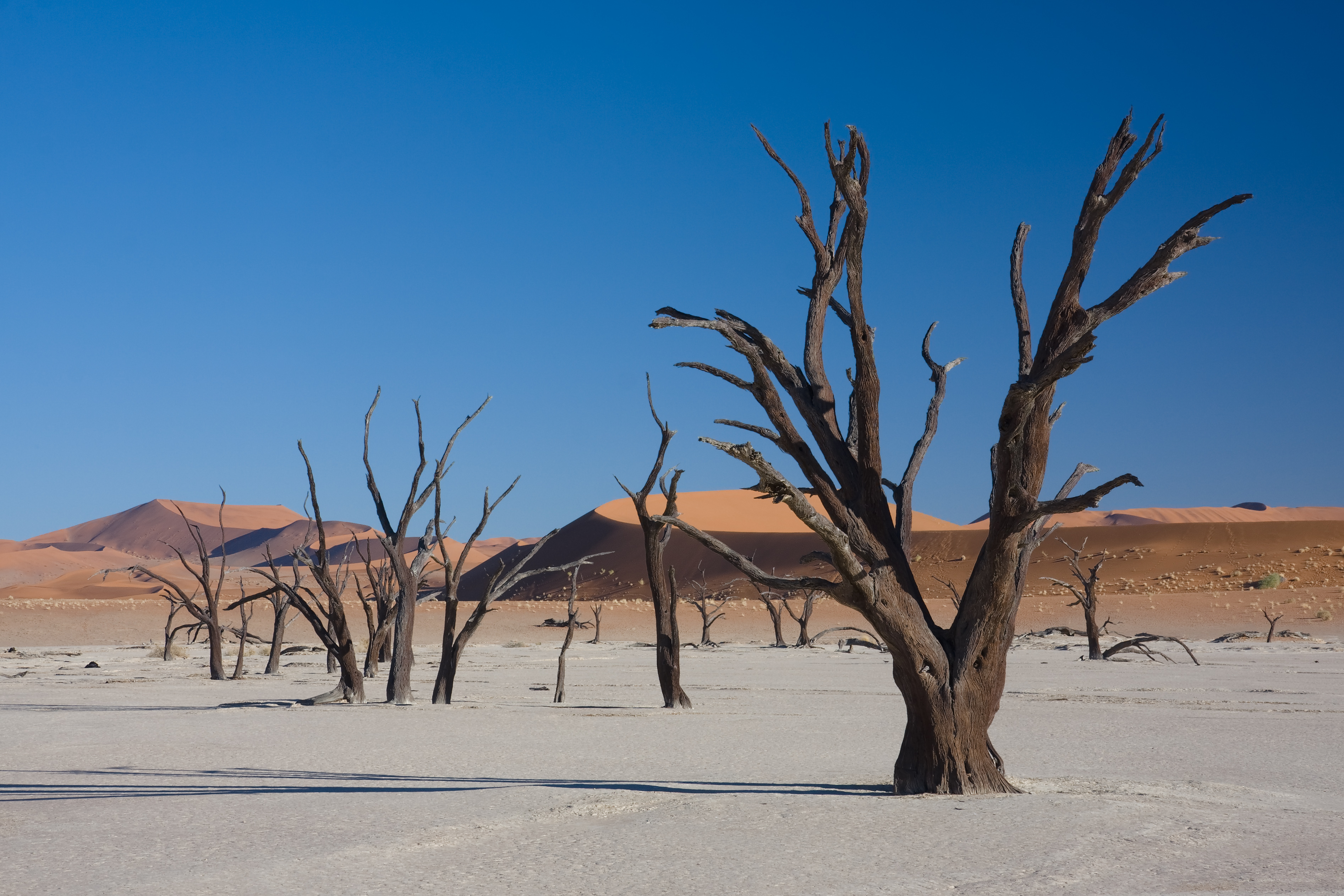
Dried-up Dead Vlei, Namibia

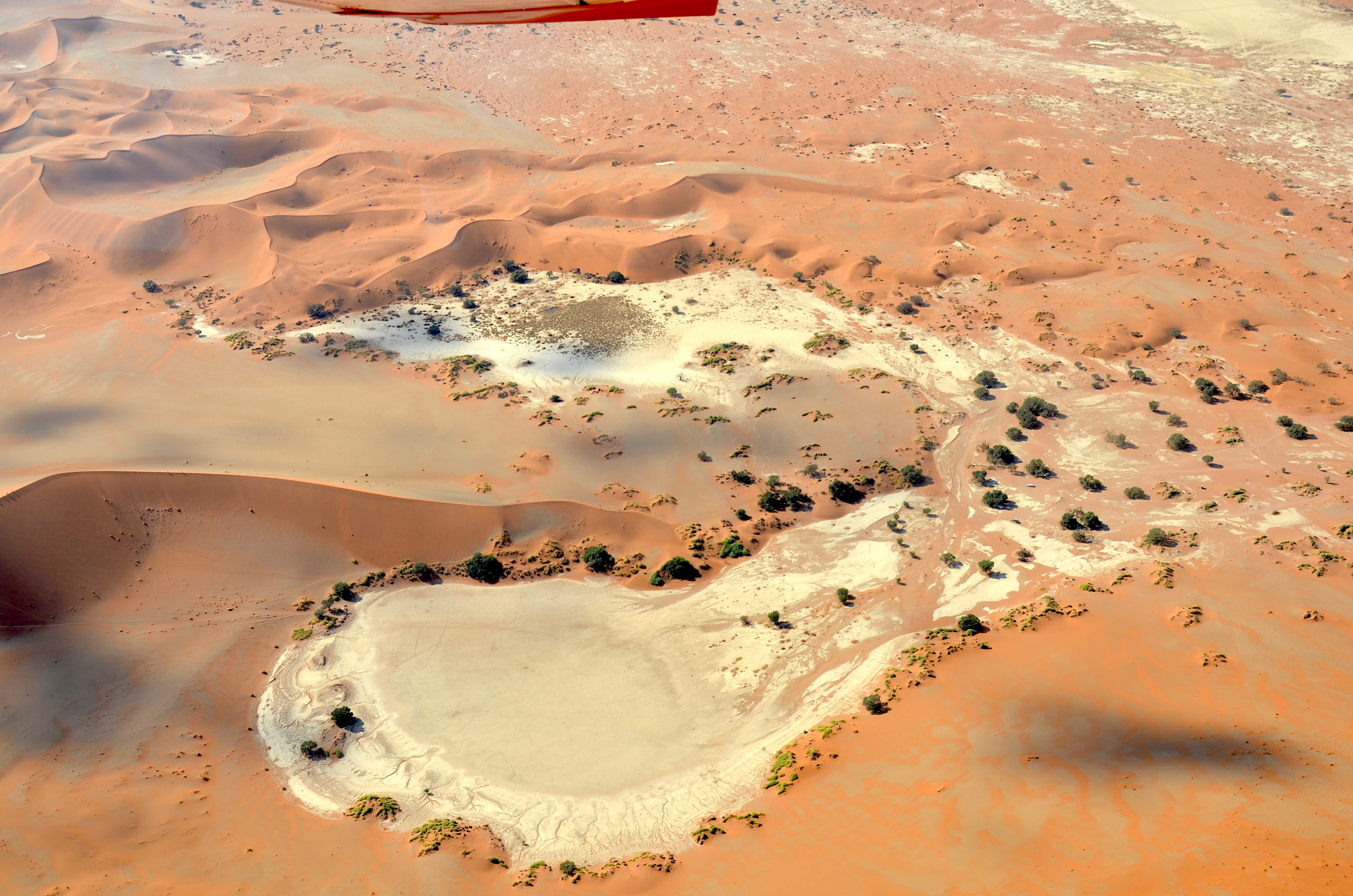
Aerial view of Sossusvlei. Most of the time without water

A vlei (/fleɪ/; Afrikaans pronunciation: [fləi]) is a shallow minor lake, mostly of a seasonal or intermittent nature. It even might refer to seasonal ponds or marshy patches where frogs and similar marsh dwellers breed. Commonly, vleis vary in their extent, or even in the presence or absence of water, according to the fall of rain or dryness of the season. In terms of water salinity, vleis may be freshwater, saltwater, or brackish. Over time a vlei may degrade into a salt pan or clay pan, such as Dead Vlei or Sossusvlei.

== Ecology ==
Vleis of various types can be of considerable local ecological importance, harboring many endemic and migratory species.

Most vleis are too minor to be granted recognition in the form of a name. However, some major vleis are accorded names, for example Rondevlei and Zeekoevlei in the Cape Peninsula, which are permanent bodies of water. Indeed, Rondevlei is home to hippopotamus.

The term is the basis of various biological common names, such as

- vlei rat, rodents in the genus Otomys
- vleiroos (literally "marsh rose")
- vleikuiken (literally "vlei chick")
- vlei frog

== Etymology ==
The word vlei is used predominantly in South Africa. It is an Afrikaans word derived from the Middle Dutch word for "valley" (valeye). In Afrikaans, however, its meaning changed into that of the shallow lake. The Afrikaans and modern Dutch word for "valley" is vallei.

The North American placename vlaie is cognate with vlei, having the same Middle Dutch derivation.
