= Sossusvlei =

Salt and clay pan in the Namib Desert, Namibia

Coordinates: 24°44′23″S 15°17′16″E

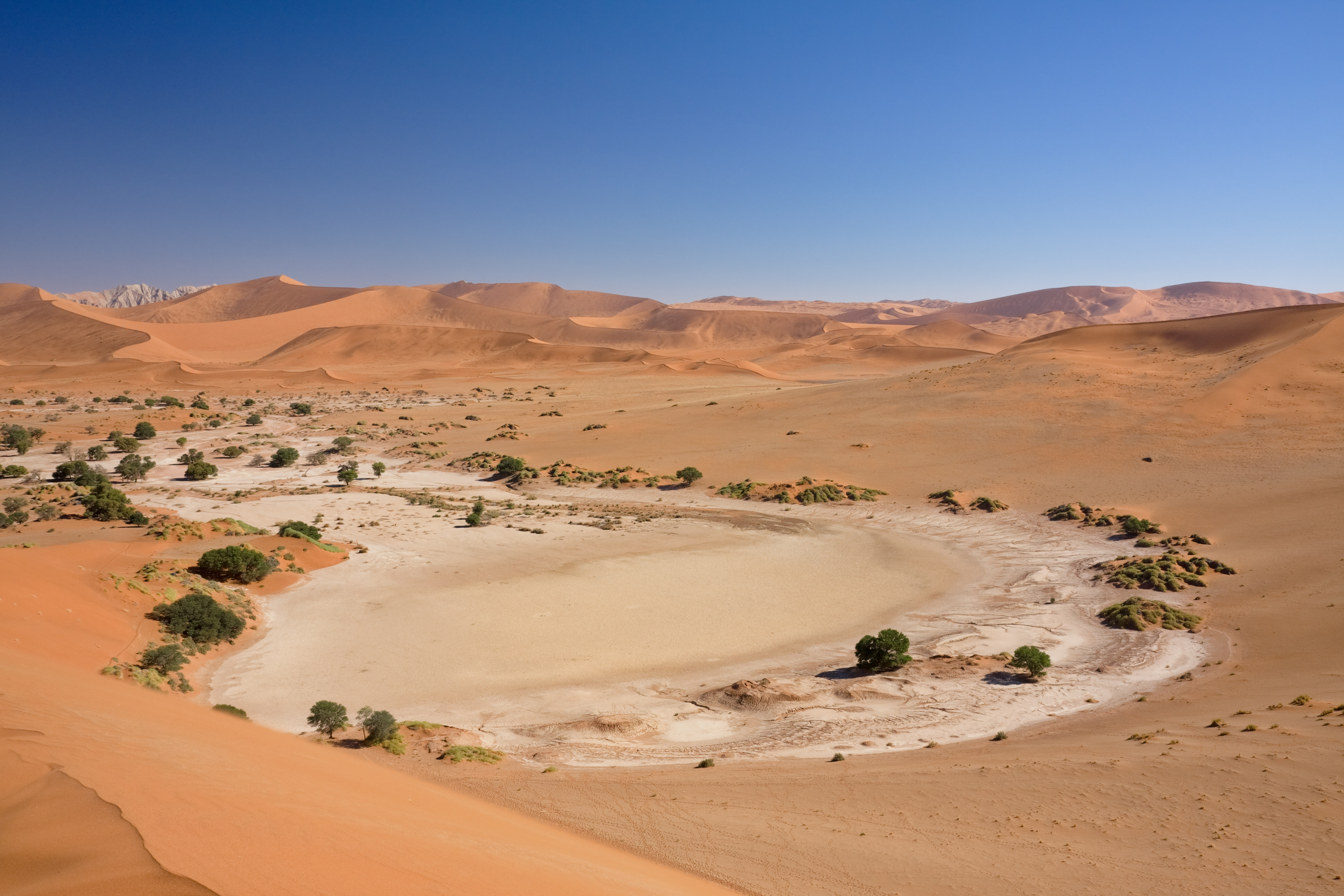
The Sossusvlei pan

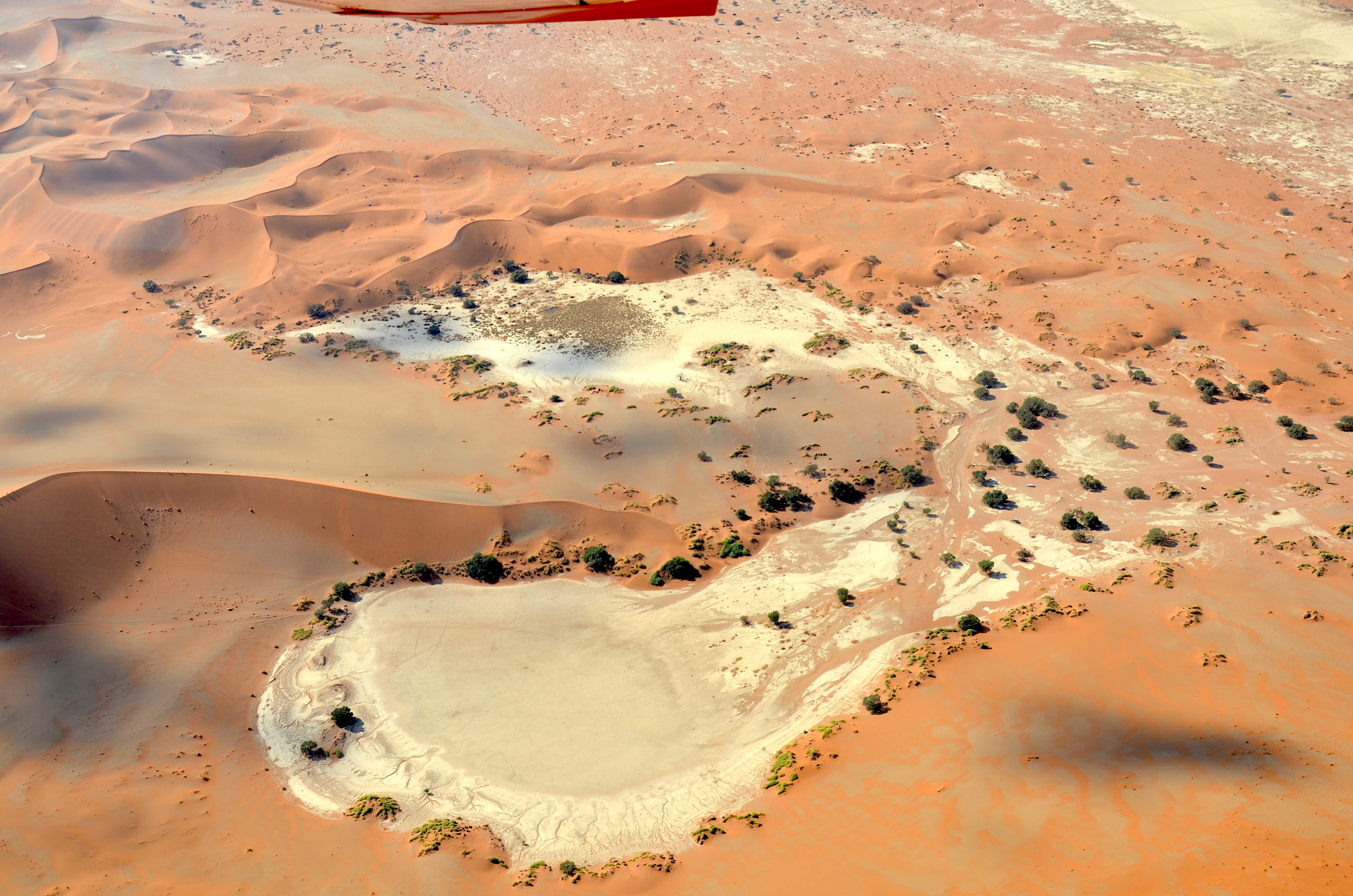
Aerial view of Sossusvlei (2017)

Pronunciation of Sossusvlei

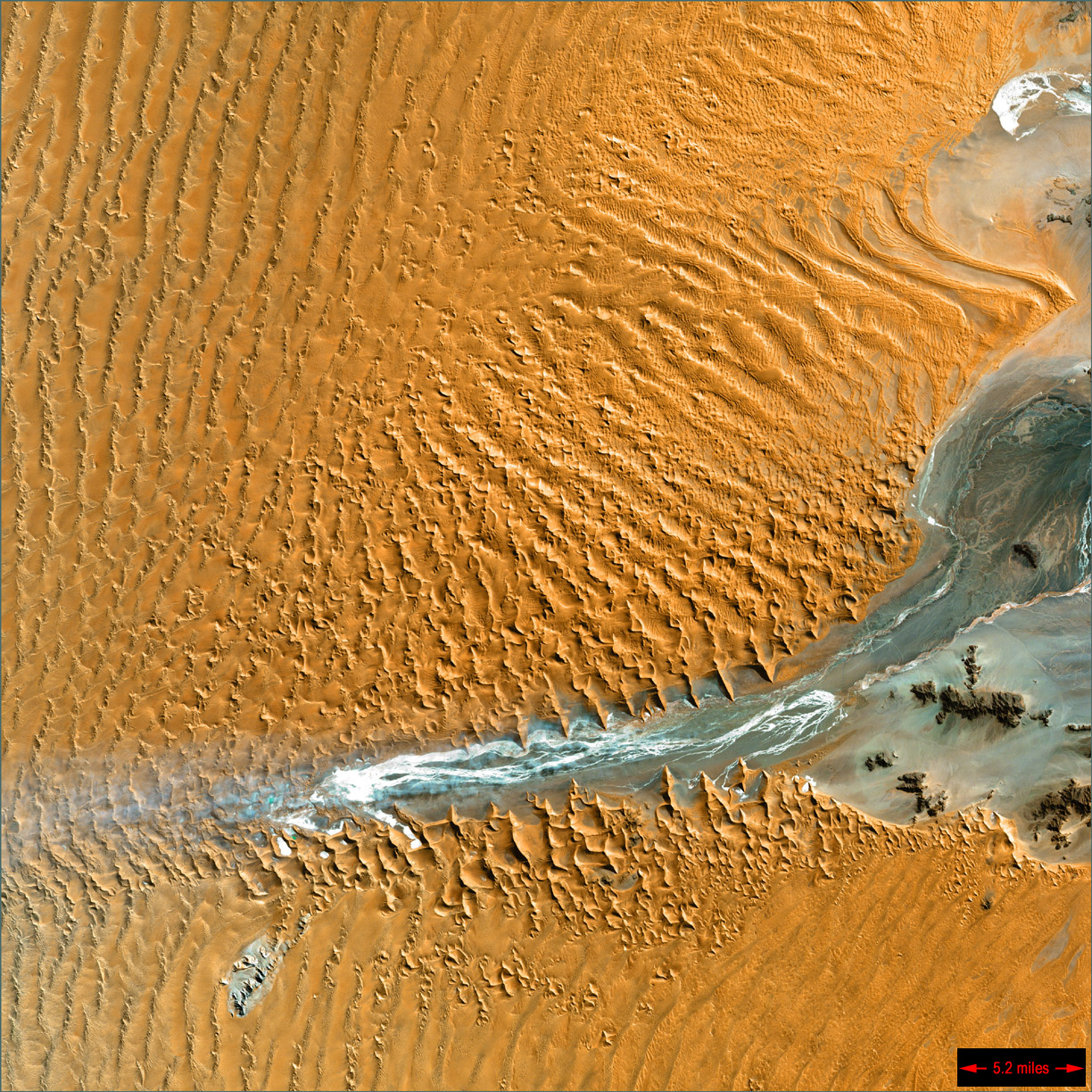
Satellite image of Sossusvlei (Landsat 7)

Sossusvlei (sometimes written Sossus Vlei) is a salt and clay pan surrounded by high red dunes, located in the southern part of the Namib Desert, in the Namib-Naukluft National Park of Namibia. The name "Sossusvlei" is often used in an extended meaning to refer to the surrounding area (including other neighbouring vleis such as Deadvlei and other high dunes). These landmarks are some of the major visitor attractions of Namibia.

The name "Sossusvlei" is of mixed origin and roughly means "dead-end marsh". Vlei is the Afrikaans word for "marsh", while "sossus" is Nama for "no return" or "dead end". Sossusvlei owes this name to the fact that it is an endorheic drainage basin (i.e., a drainage basin without outflows) for the ephemeral Tsauchab River.

== Environment ==
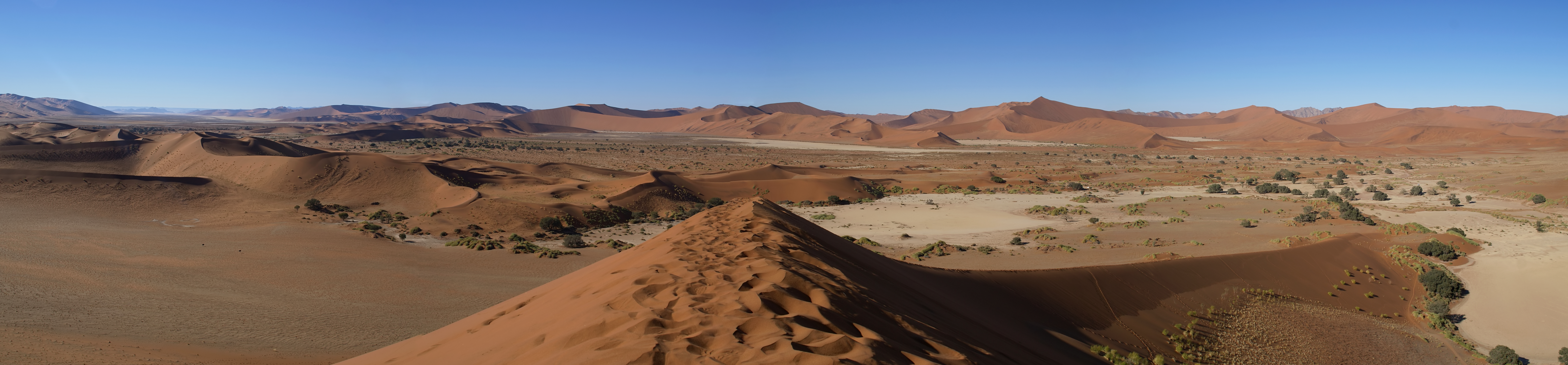
The Sossusvlei area. The Sossusvlei pan proper is the flat ellipse in a lighter shade of color seen behind the dune in the foreground (mostly on its right)

The Sossusvlei area forms part of a wider region of the southern Namib Desert with homogeneous features (about 32.000 km²) extending between the Koichab and Kuiseb rivers. This area is characterized by high sand dunes in different shades of orange - the colour an indication of a high concentration of iron, after being exposed to the process of oxidation over many years. The older the dunes, the more intense the reddish colour. These dunes are among the highest in the world; many of them higher than 200 metres, the highest being the one nicknamed Big Daddy, about 325 metres high.

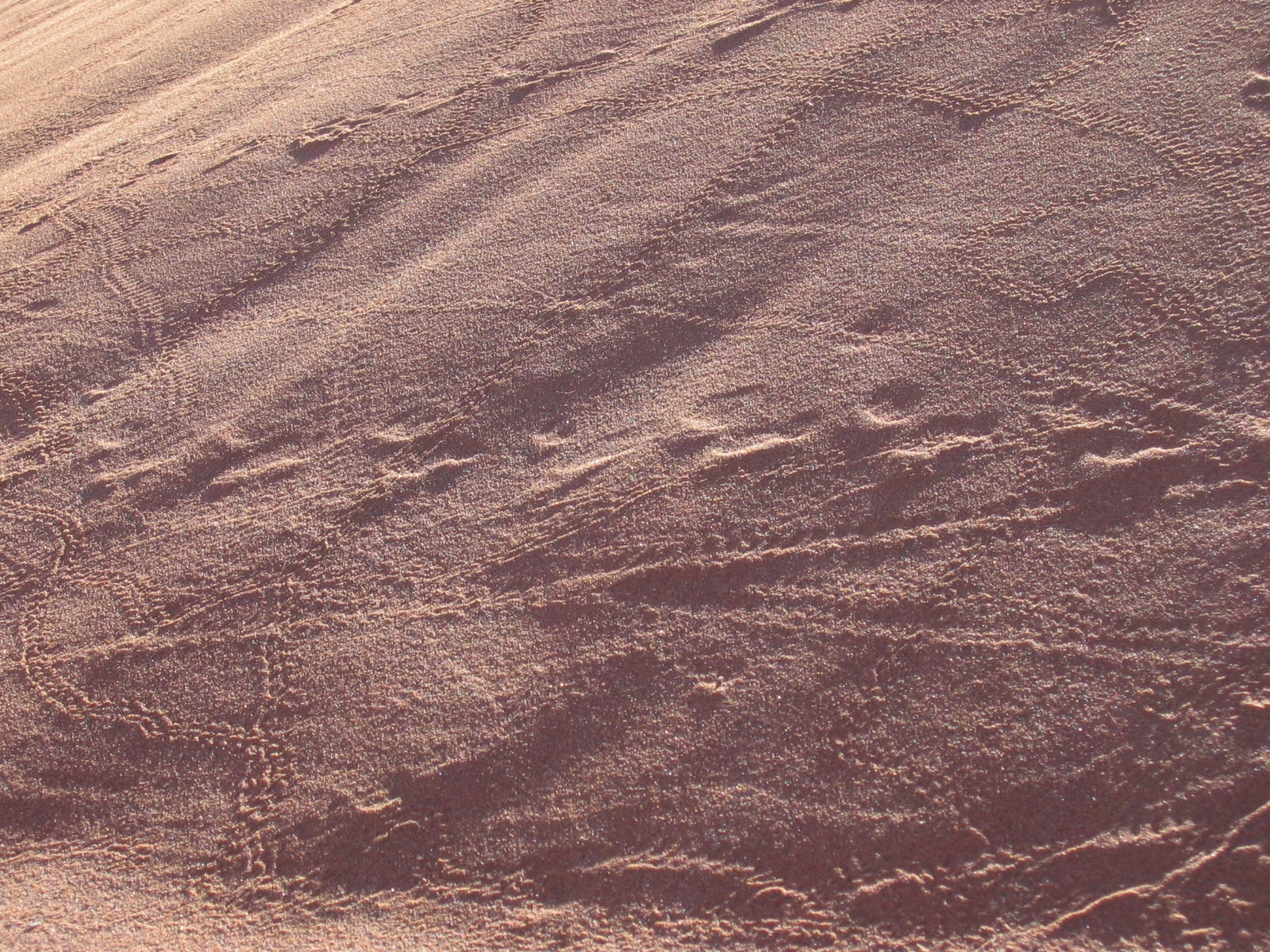
Traces in the sand, left by insects and other small animals

The highest and more stable dunes are partially covered with relatively rich vegetation, which is mainly watered by a number of underground and ephemeral rivers that seasonally flood the pans, creating marshes that are locally known as vleis. When dried up, these pans look almost white in color, due to the high concentration of salt. Another important source of water for Sossusvlei is the moisture from the daily morning fogs that enter the desert from the Atlantic Ocean.

Fauna in the Sossusvlei area is surprisingly rich in variety. It mostly comprises small animals that can survive with little water, including a number of arthropods, small reptiles, and small mammals (such as rodents or jackals). Bigger animals include antelopes (mainly oryxes and springboks) and ostriches. On the rare occasion that the pans flood, several migrant bird species might be found in the water. Much of the Sossusvlei and Namib fauna is endemic and highly adapted to the specific conditions of the Namib, for instance, the Namib Desert Beetle which has developed a technique for collecting water from the early morning fog with the help of the specially adapted bumps on its back.

=== Climate ===
Sossusvlei has a hot desert climate. The annual mean average temperature is 24 °C. In winter, the nighttime lows are around 10 °C, while in summer temperatures often reach up to 40 °C. Being situated in the Namib desert, there is a large variation between day and night temperatures. Rain is a rare phenomenon.

Climate data for Sesriem, Namibia (2010–2017 averages)
Month	Jan	Feb	Mar	Apr	May	Jun	Jul	Aug	Sep	Oct	Nov	Dec	Year
Record high °C (°F)	40.6 (105.1)	39.8 (103.6)	36.8 (98.2)	37.0 (98.6)	34.7 (94.5)	29.8 (85.6)	29.9 (85.8)	35.8 (96.4)	38.5 (101.3)	40.1 (104.2)	40.5 (104.9)	40.1 (104.2)	40.6 (105.1)
Mean daily maximum °C (°F)	33.2 (91.8)	34.5 (94.1)	34.2 (93.6)	31.4 (88.5)	29.1 (84.4)	25.7 (78.3)	25.3 (77.5)	28.1 (82.6)	30.7 (87.3)	32.9 (91.2)	33.5 (92.3)	34.1 (93.4)	34.5 (94.1)
Daily mean °C (°F)	25.4 (77.7)	26.7 (80.1)	26.7 (80.1)	23.4 (74.1)	20.7 (69.3)	16.5 (61.7)	16.9 (62.4)	18.4 (65.1)	21.8 (71.2)	23.9 (75.0)	25.2 (77.4)	25.5 (77.9)	22.6 (72.7)
Mean daily minimum °C (°F)	17.2 (63.0)	19.1 (66.4)	20.2 (68.4)	15.3 (59.5)	12.3 (54.1)	7.9 (46.2)	8.4 (47.1)	8.6 (47.5)	12.0 (53.6)	13.6 (56.5)	15.5 (59.9)	15.8 (60.4)	7.9 (46.2)
Record low °C (°F)	7.6 (45.7)	11.1 (52.0)	14.9 (58.8)	5.6 (42.1)	0.6 (33.1)	−2.3 (27.9)	−2.3 (27.9)	−1.8 (28.8)	1.7 (35.1)	4.4 (39.9)	5.2 (41.4)	0 (32)	−2.3 (27.9)
Average precipitation mm (inches)	14.9 (0.59)	16.1 (0.63)	39.6 (1.56)	8.9 (0.35)	13.2 (0.52)	0.8 (0.03)	0.1 (0.00)	1.2 (0.05)	2.6 (0.10)	1.4 (0.06)	0.8 (0.03)	4.1 (0.16)	104 (4.1)

== Landmarks ==
=== Sesriem ===
Access to the Sossusvlei area of the Namib-Naukluft National Park is from the Sesriem gate, which is located in the surroundings of the eponymous canyon. From Sesriem, a 60 km tarmac road leads to Sossusvlei proper.

=== Elim Dune ===
The Elim Dune is a high and relatively isolated dune located 5 km past the Sesriem gate, on a branch of the main road connecting Sesriem to Sossusvlei. The dune takes its name from a farm that used to be in the area before the National Park was established.

=== Dune 45 ===
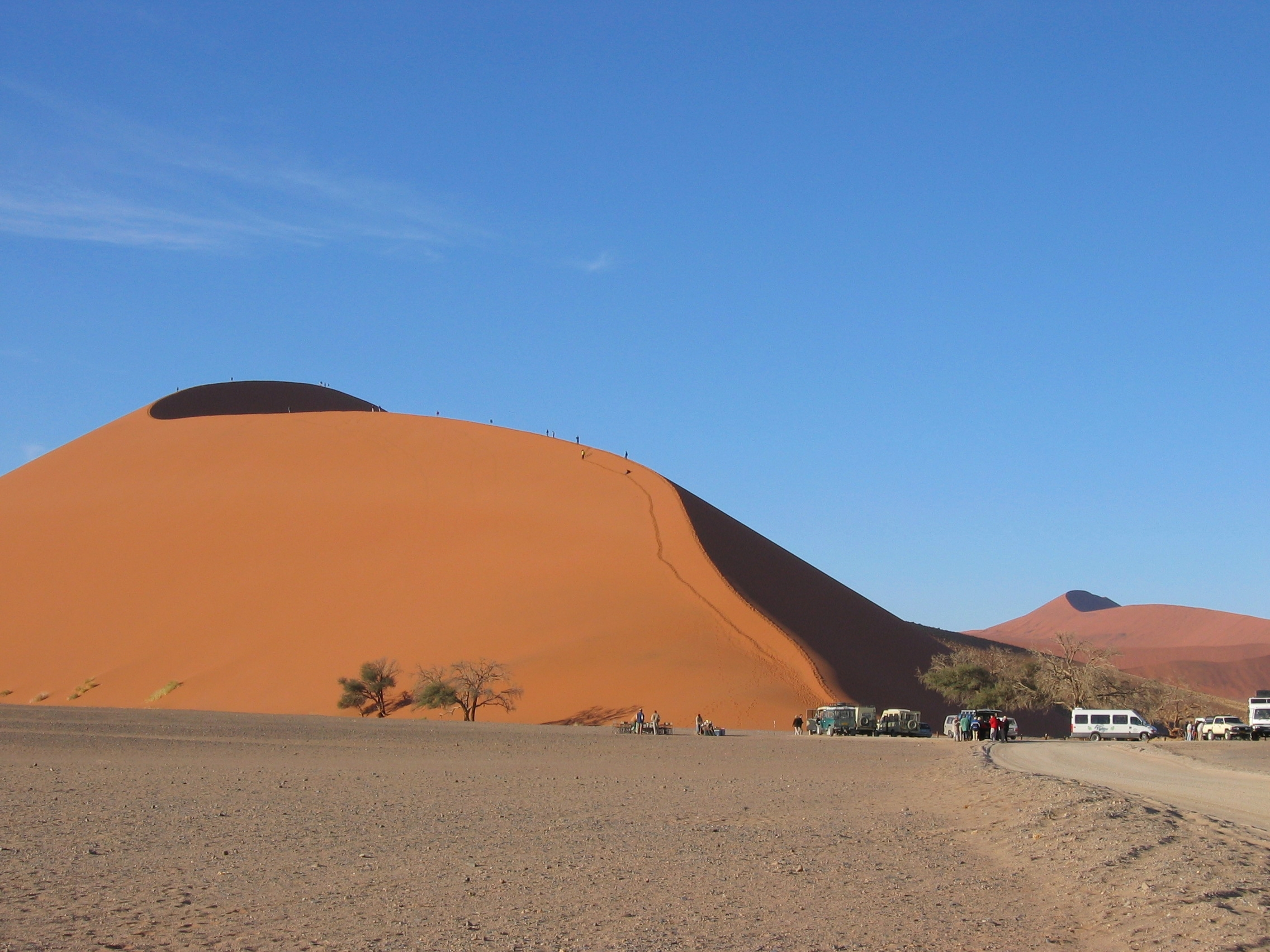
Dune 45

Dune 45 is so called because it lies 45 km past Sesriem on the road to Sossusvlei. It is 80 meters high and it is composed of 5-million-year-old sands.

=== Sossusvlei ===
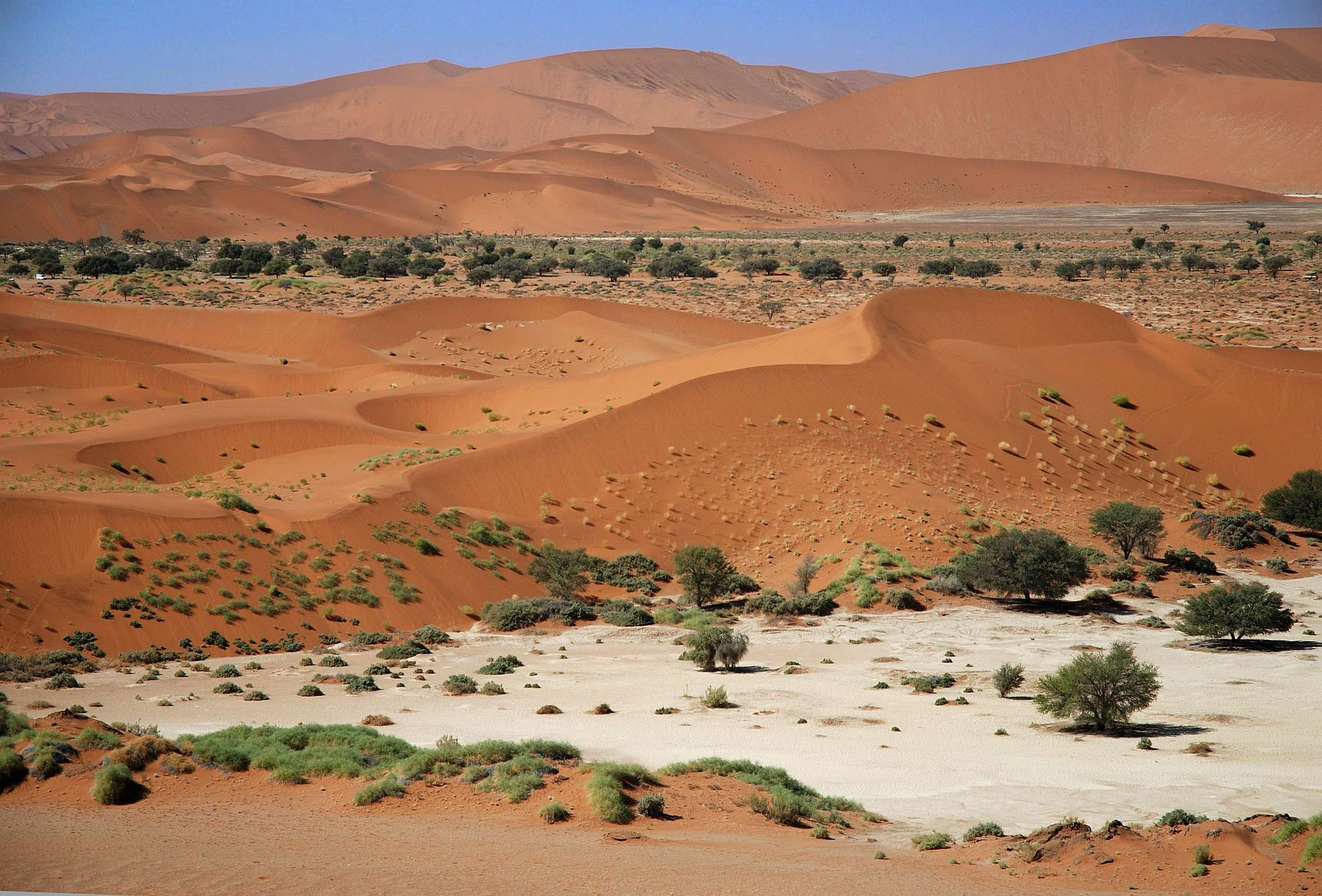
Sossusvlei seen from the dunes

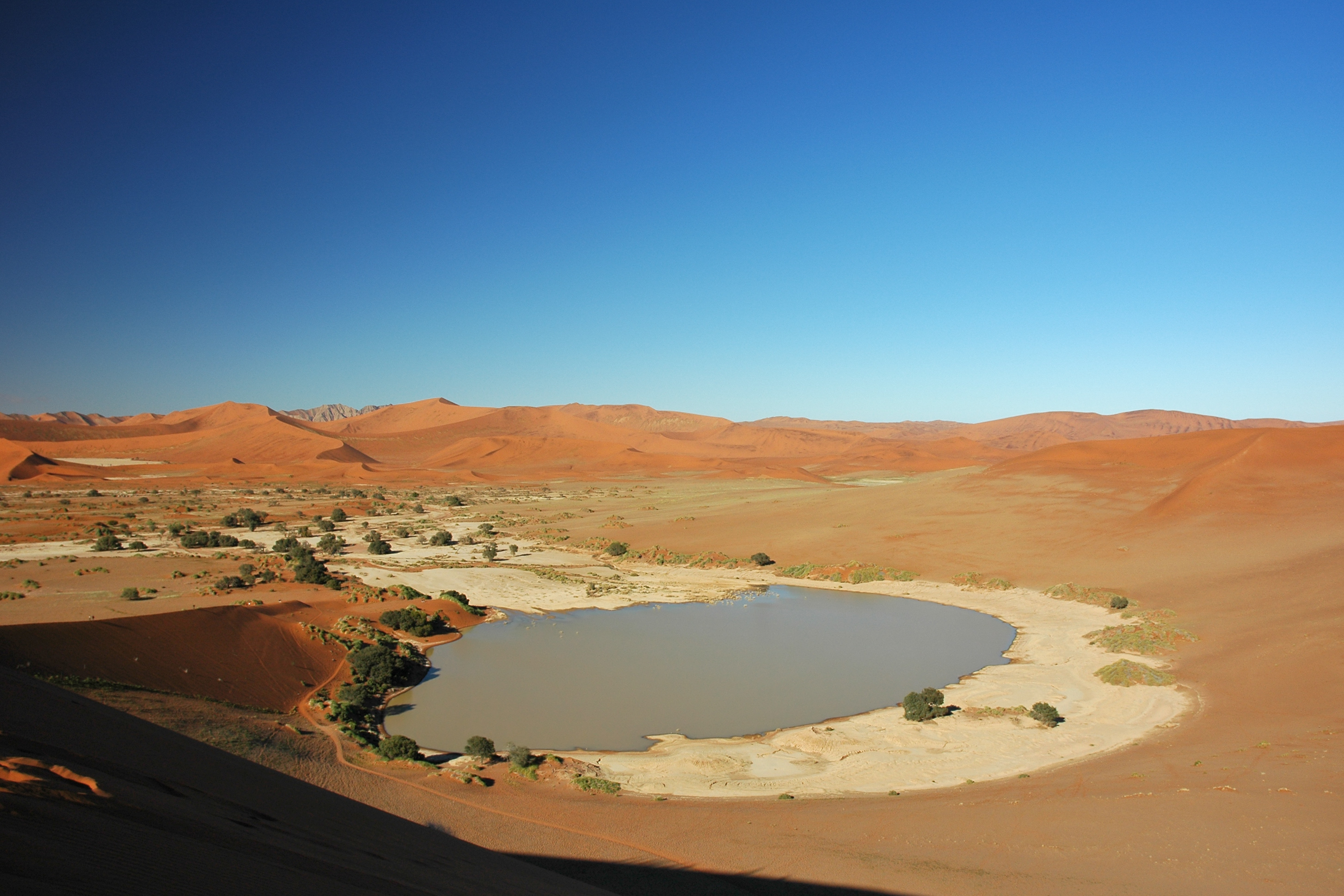
Sossusvlei during an occasional flood

Sossusvlei is about 66 km past the Sesriem gate. The last 6 km can only be traversed with 4WD vehicles as the metalled road ends and sand begins (the place where the metalled road ends is known as "2x4 parking" as any non-4WD vehicle must stop there). Sossusvlei is a clay pan, of roughly elliptical shape, covered in a crust of salt-rich sand. While the pan has been shaped over time by the Tsauchab river, the actual flooding of the pan is a relatively rare event, and sometimes several years pass between one flood and the next one. The river is dry most of the year, and even when it is not, it carries relatively little water to the vlei. The vlei is surrounded by high orange-reddish dunes, partially covered by a vegetation comprising grass, bushes, and some trees (mostly of species Vachellia erioloba).

=== Big Daddy ===
Big Daddy is the highest dune in the Sossusvlei area, at about 325 meters. Big Daddy is located past Sossusvlei proper, near Deadvlei. It faces another very high dune known as "Big Mama".

Big Daddy is distinct from Dune 7, near Walvis Bay.

=== Deadvlei ===
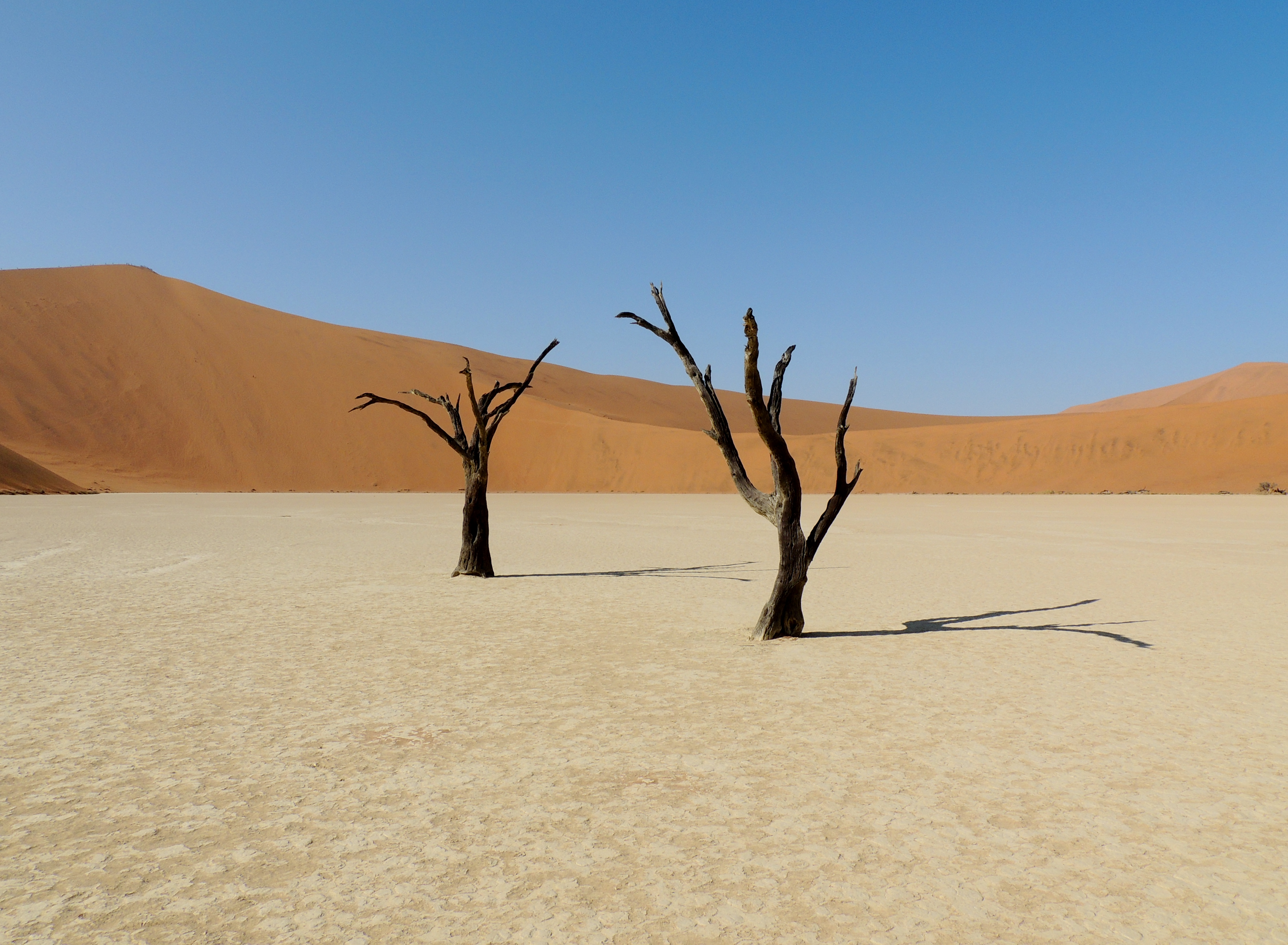
Deadvlei

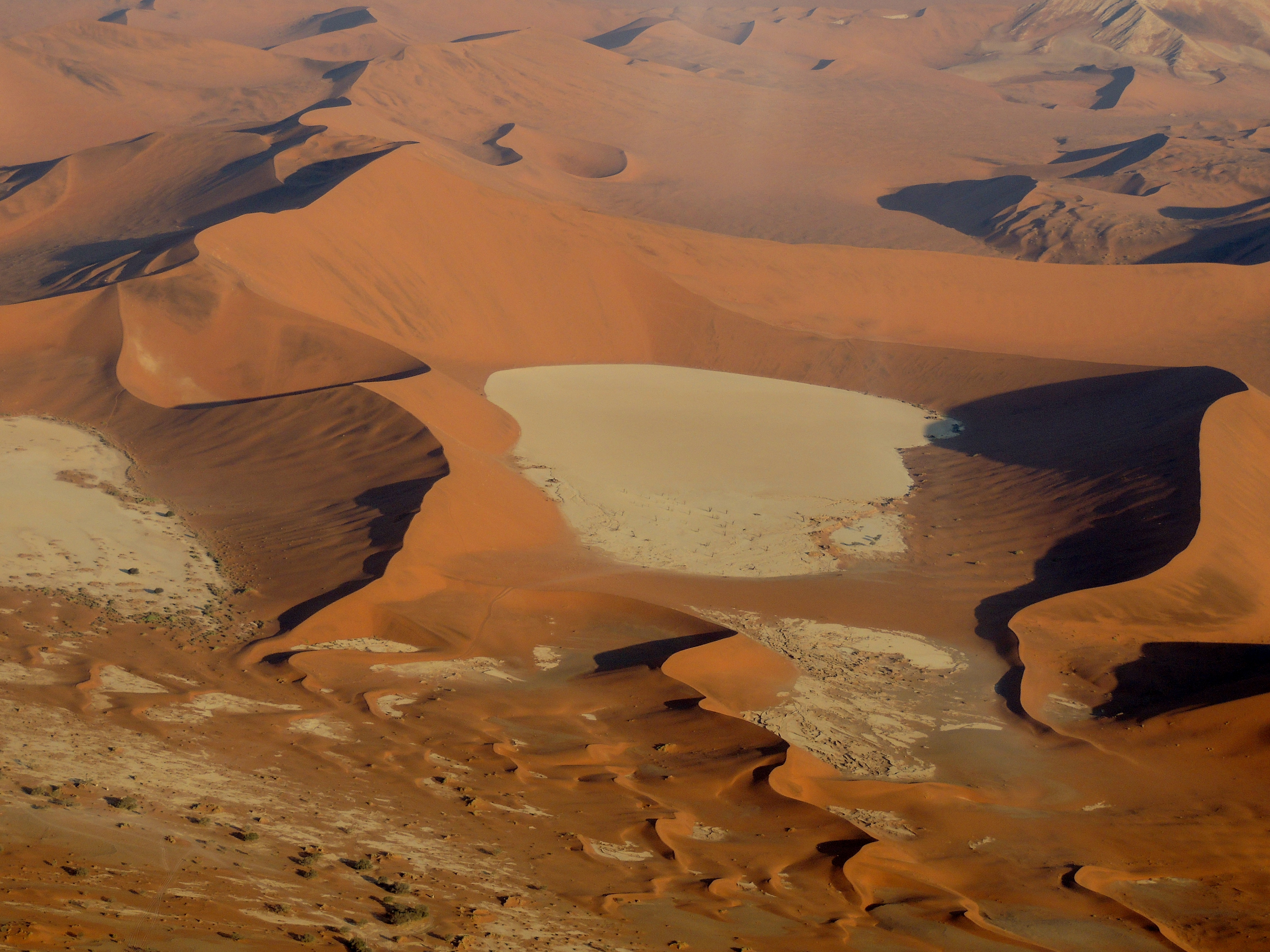
Deadvlei by air

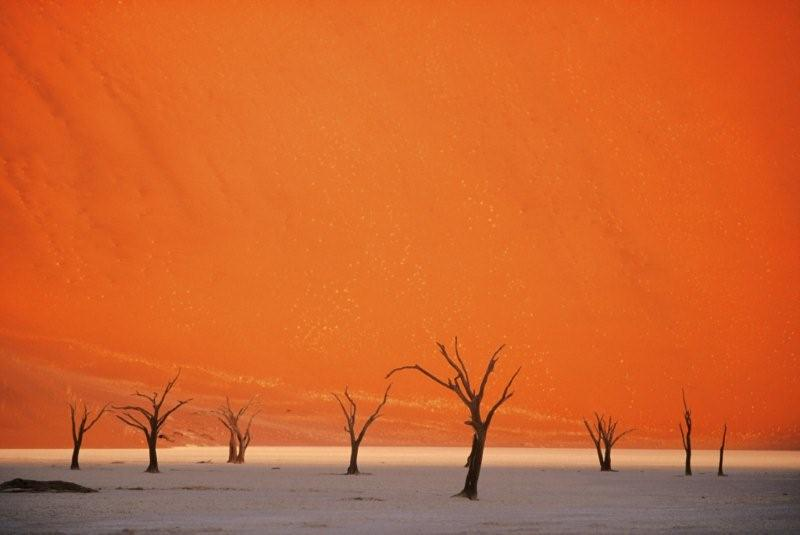
Dead Camelthorn trees in Deadvlei

Deadvlei is another clay pan, about 2 km from Sossusvlei. A notable feature of Deadvlei is that it used to be an oasis with several camelthorn trees; afterwards, the river that watered the oasis changed its course. The pan is thus punctuated by blackened, dead camelthorn trees, in vivid contrast to the shiny white of the salty floor of the pan and the intense orange of the dunes. This creates a particularly fascinating and surrealistic landscape, that appears in innumerable pictures and has been used as a setting for films and videos.

=== Hiddenvlei ===
Hiddenvlei (or Hidden Vlei) is another vlei in the Sossusvlei area. It is 4 km from the 2×4 parking, and it is the least visited.

=== Lithified dunes ===
Lithified dunes are sand dunes that have solidified to rock and are found in several places in the Sossusvlei area.

== Tourism ==
Since Sossusvlei is possibly the foremost attraction of Namibia, much has been done by the Namibian authorities to support and facilitate tourism in the area. The asphalt road was built in the early 2000s (decade) to connect Sesriem and Sossusvlei's 2x4 parking is one of the very few non-urban metalled roads in Namibia. Numerous places of accommodation are found along the border of the National Park, between Sesriem and the nearest settlement, Solitaire. Recently, accommodation has been built inside the park. It is also possible to take scenic flights over the dunes, either with small planes (mainly from Swakopmund and Walvis Bay) or in hot air balloons (departing from Sesriem in the morning).

== In popular culture ==
As a consequence of its fascinating and surrealistic landscapes, Sossusvlei is one of the most photographed places in Subsaharan Africa. The area has been the setting of a number of commercials, music videos, and movies, especially of the fantasy genre; one of the most well-known examples is the psychological thriller The Cell (2000), where the Sossusvlei landscape is used to represent an oneiric virtual reality.

The nonverbal documentary Samsara depends on a number of shots of the desert for subtle spiritual commentary. Other movies with scenes shot in Sossusvlei include The Fall and Steel Dawn.
