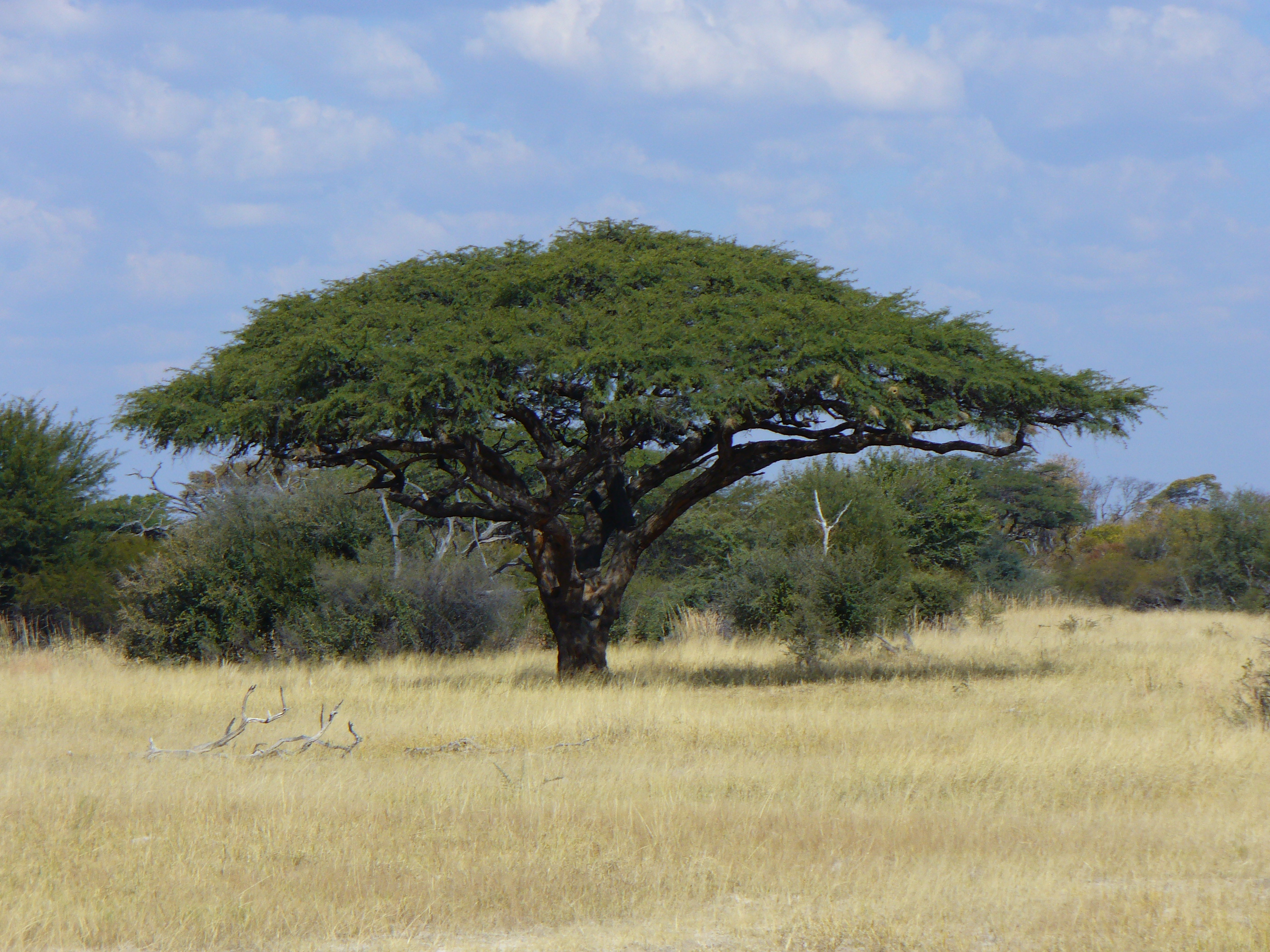
- Vachellia erioloba camel thorn
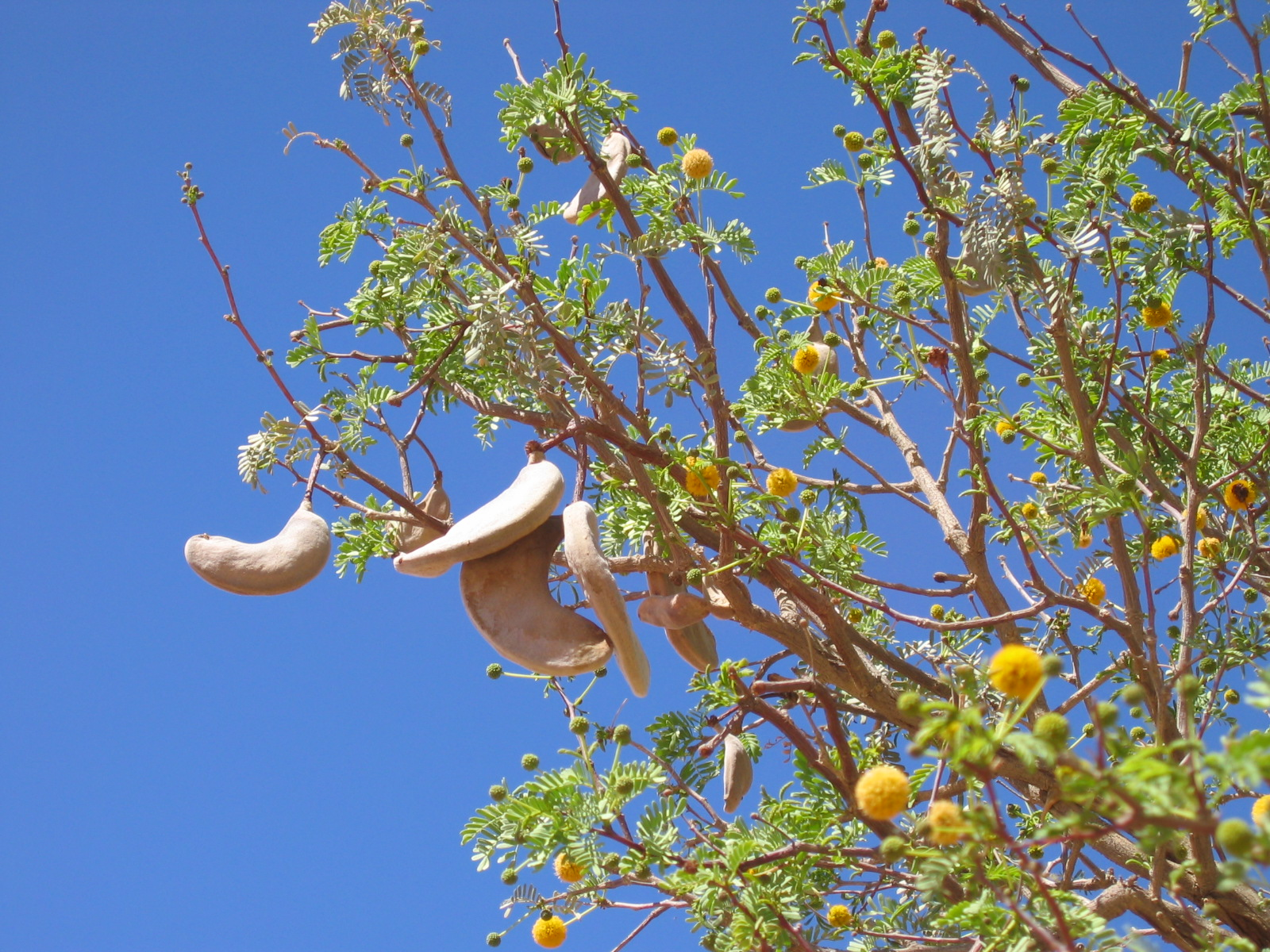
- Flowers and pods

Conservation status
- Least Concern (IUCN 3.1)

Scientific classification
- Kingdom: Plantae
- Clade: Tracheophytes
- Clade: Angiosperms
- Clade: Eudicots
- Clade: Rosids
- Order: Fabales
- Family: Fabaceae
- Subfamily: Caesalpinioideae
- Clade: Mimosoid clade
- Genus: Vachellia
- Species: V. erioloba

Binomial name
- Vachellia erioloba (E.Mey.) P.J.H.Hurter

Synonyms
- Homotypic Synonyms: Acacia erioloba E.Mey.; Heterotypic Synonyms: Acacia giraffae Willd.; Acacia giraffae var. espinosa Kuntze; Mimosa cameleopardalis Barrow; Mimosa giraffae Poir.

= Vachellia erioloba =

Species of tree native to southern Africa

Vachellia erioloba is a species of flowering plant in the family Fabaceae. This African tree is sometimes referred to by the common names camel thorn, giraffe thorn, mokala tree, or kameeldoring in Afrikaans. The type specimen of Acacia giraffae, proved on closer examination to be a hybrid of V. haematoxylon and the species which would later become known as V. erioloba. The name V. erioloba was therefore proposed for the vast numbers of camel thorn which are not hybrids. Its preferred habitat is the deep dry sandy soils in parts of South Africa, Botswana, the western areas of Zimbabwe and Namibia. It is also native to Angola, south-west Mozambique, Zambia and Eswatini. The tree was first described by Ernst Heinrich Friedrich Meyer and Johann Franz Drège in 1836. The camel thorn is a protected tree in South Africa.

The tree can grow up to 20 metres (66 ft) high. It is slow-growing, very hardy to drought and fairly frost-resistant. The light-grey colored thorns reflect sunlight, and the bipinnate leaves close when it is hot. The wood is dark reddish-brown in colour and extremely dense and strong. It is good for fires, which leads to widespread clearing of dead trees and the felling of healthy trees. It produces ear-shaped pods, favoured by many herbivores including cattle. The seeds can be roasted and used as a substitute for coffee beans.

The name 'camel thorn' refers to the fact that giraffe (kameelperd in Afrikaans) commonly feed on the leaves with their specially-adapted tongue and lips that can avoid the thorns. The scientific name 'erioloba' means "wooly lobe", a reference to the ear-shaped pods.

It is commonly associated with the long running PBS wildlife program Nature, as the tree is used in the title sequence and program logo.

== Gallery ==
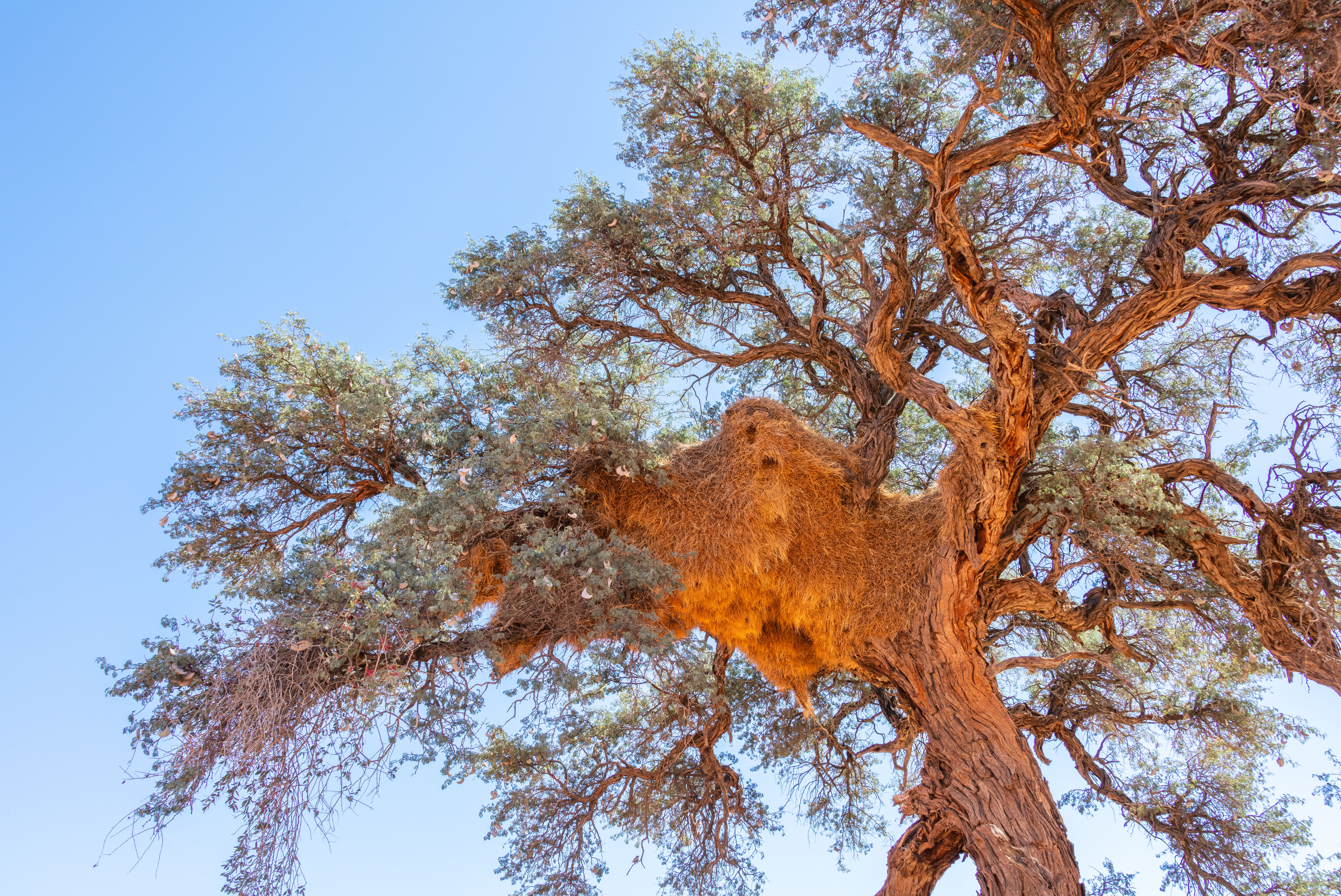
Vachellia erioloba hosting a nest of sociable weavers (Philetairus socius)

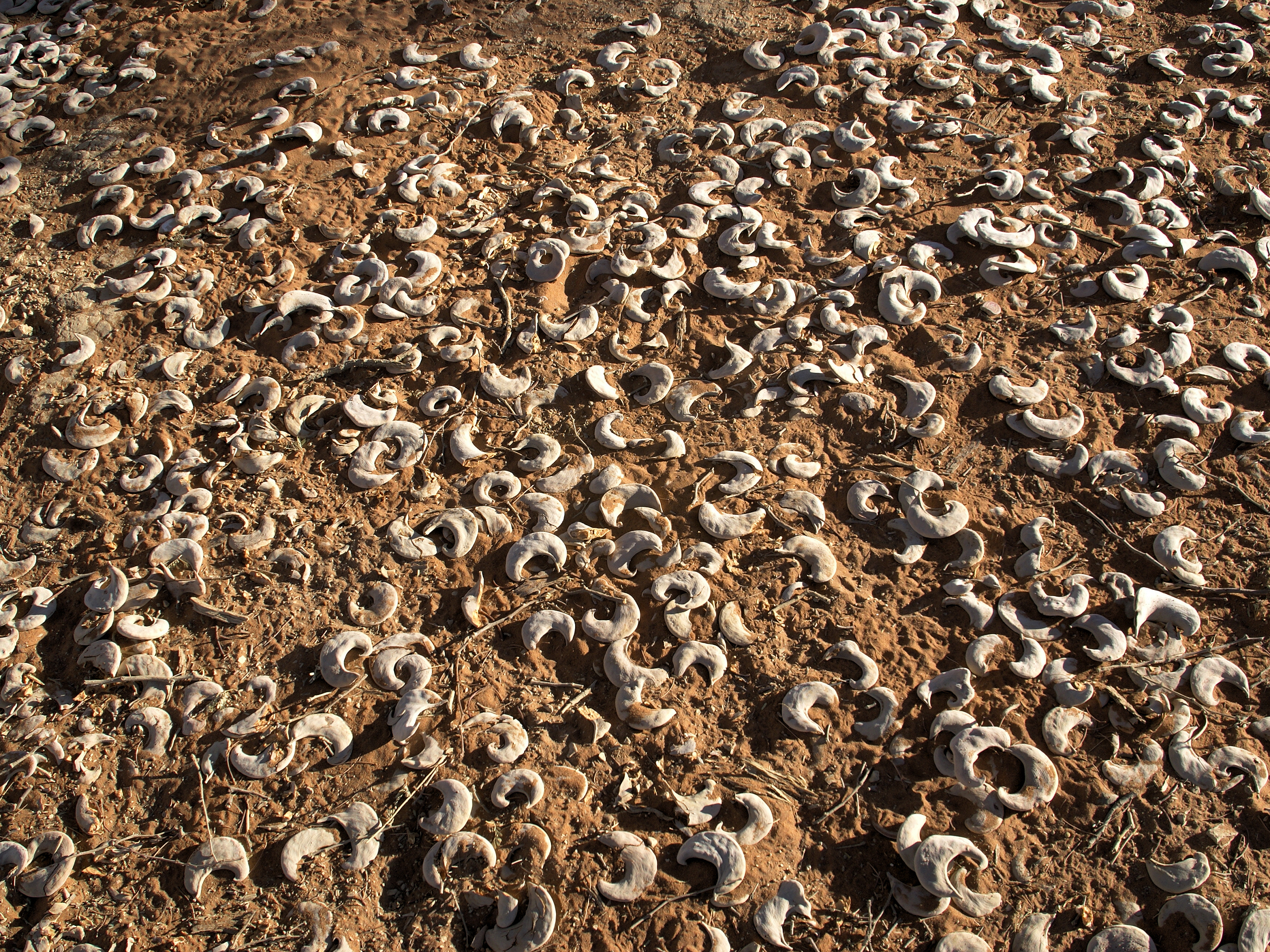
Vachellia erioloba seeds, lying upon the ground, scattered among their pods, Sossusvlei, Namib Desert, Namibia

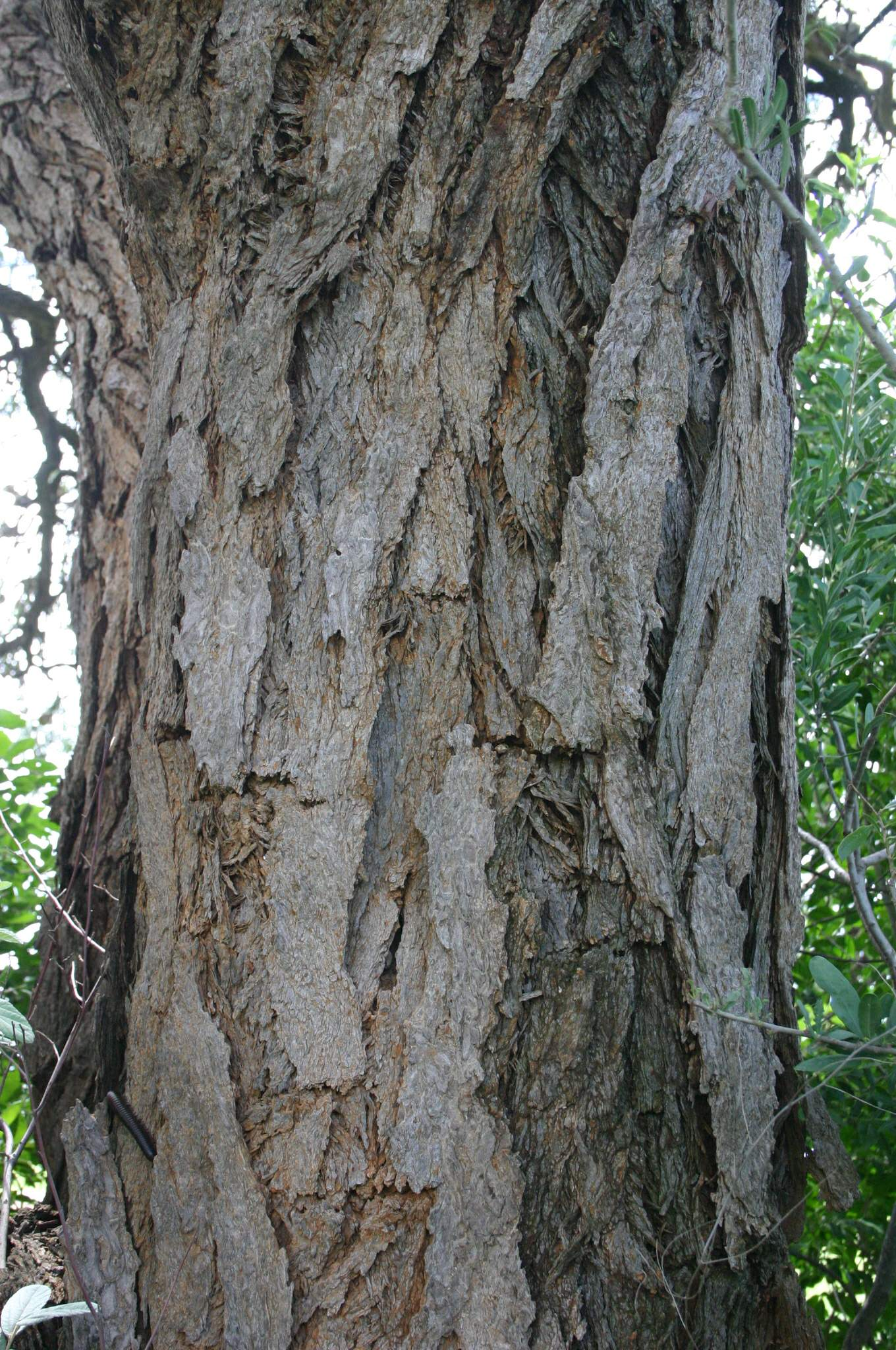
Bark of a tree near Potgietersrust in Limpopo, South Africa

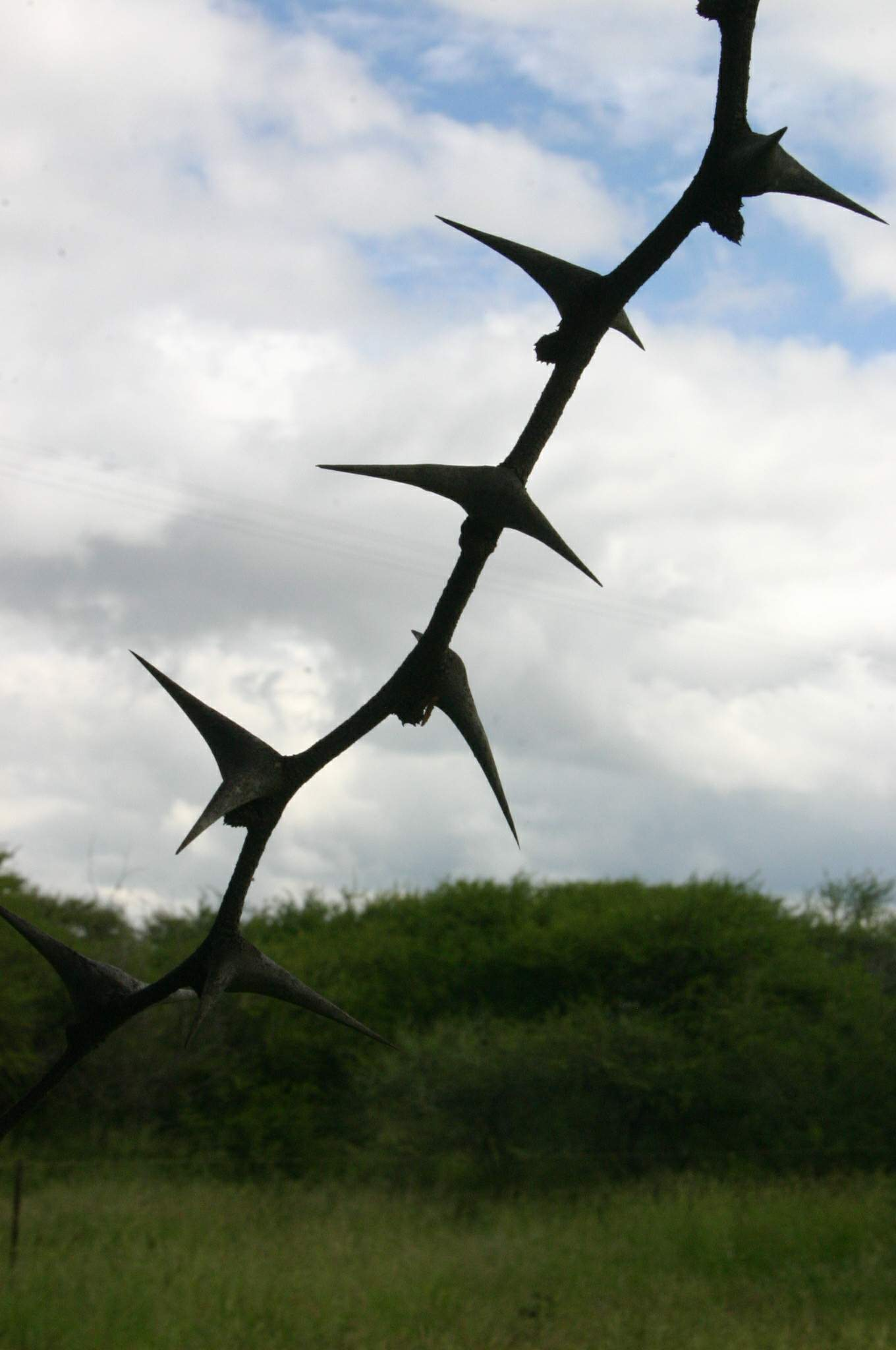
The sharp thorns of the Mokala resemble barbed wire (growing near Potgietersrust in Limpopo, South Africa)

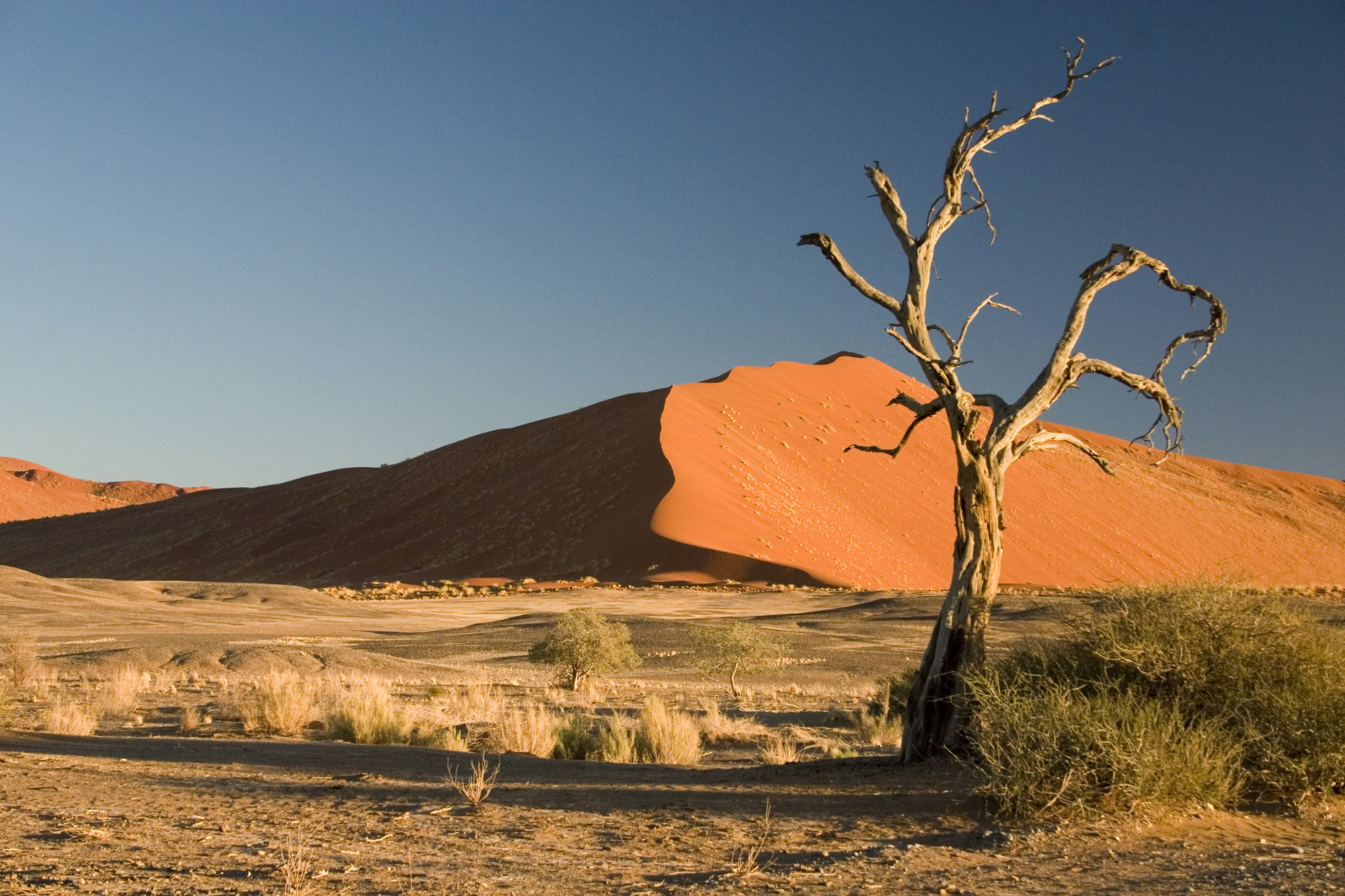
Vachellia erioloba tree in the Namib Desert

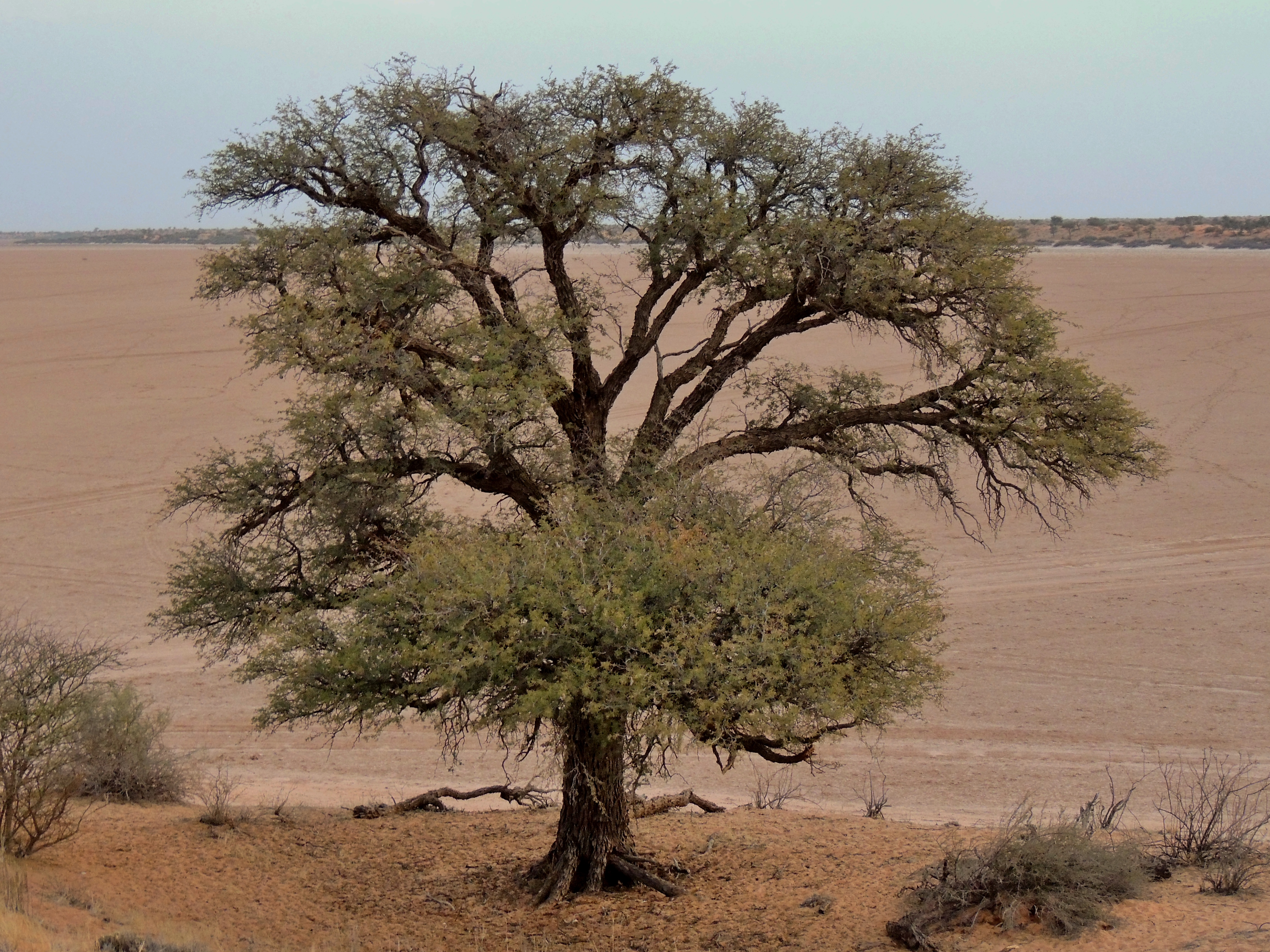
Vachellia erioloba, Kalahari desert

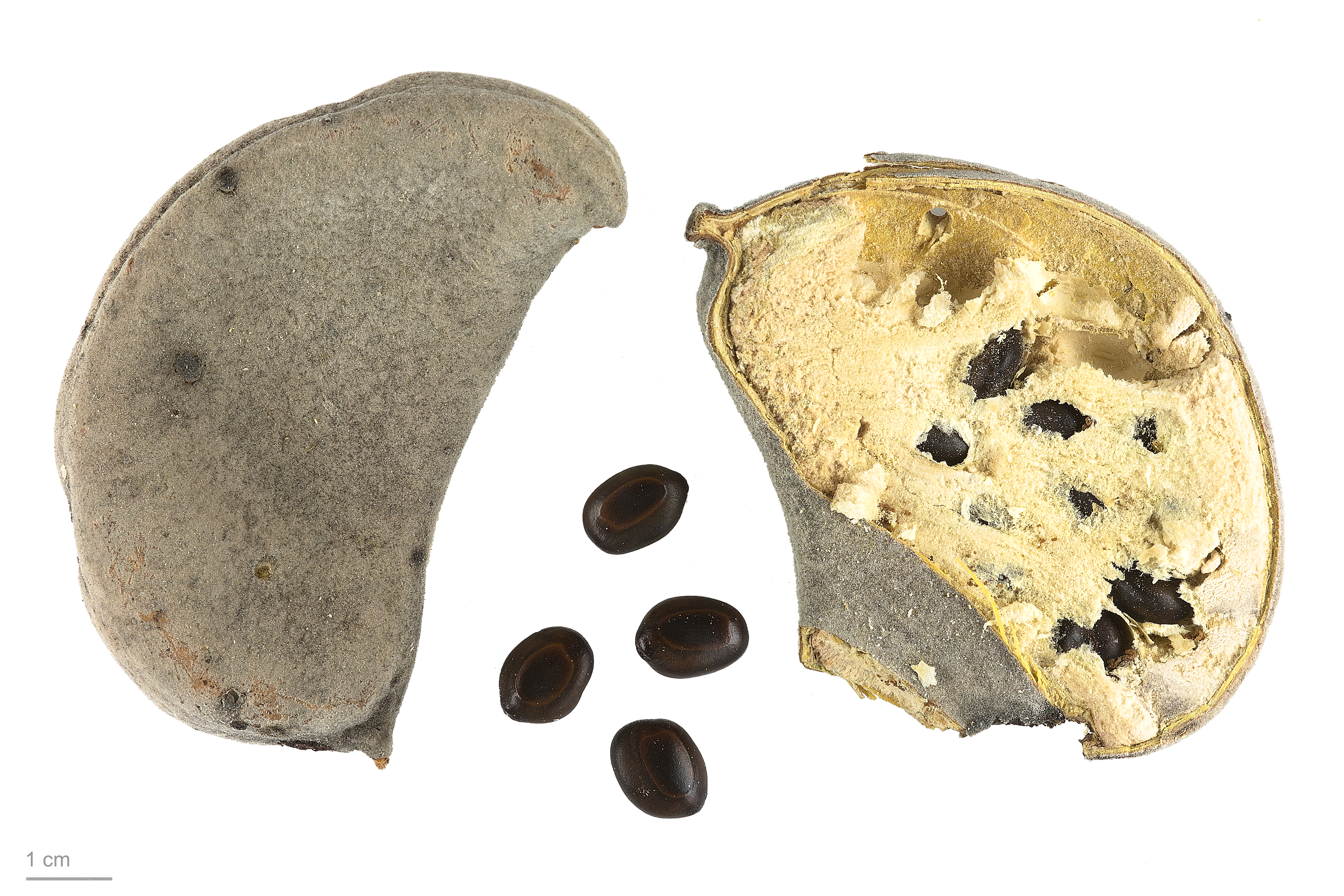
Vachellia erioloba - Museum specimen - MHNT

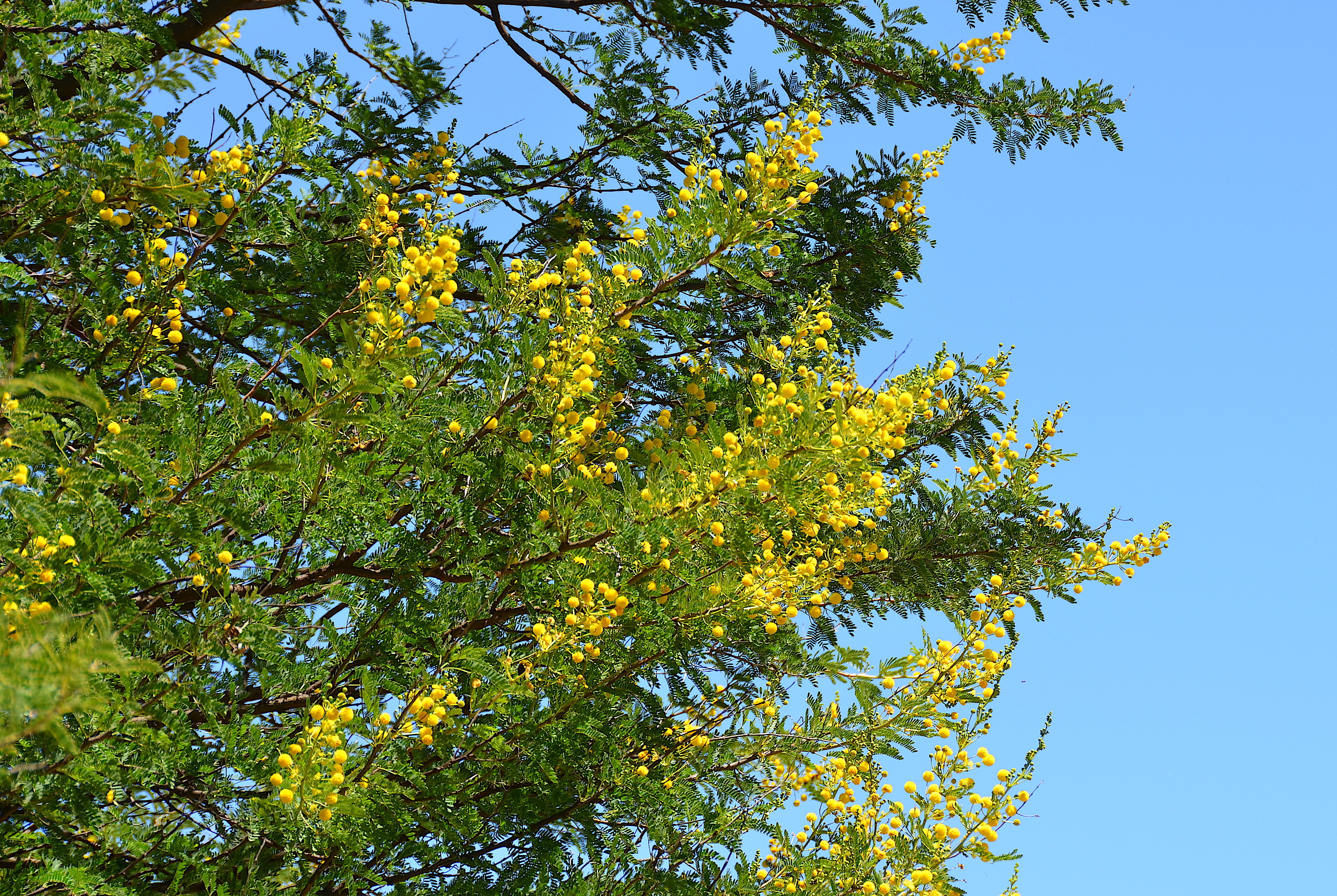
Blossoms of camel thorn tree

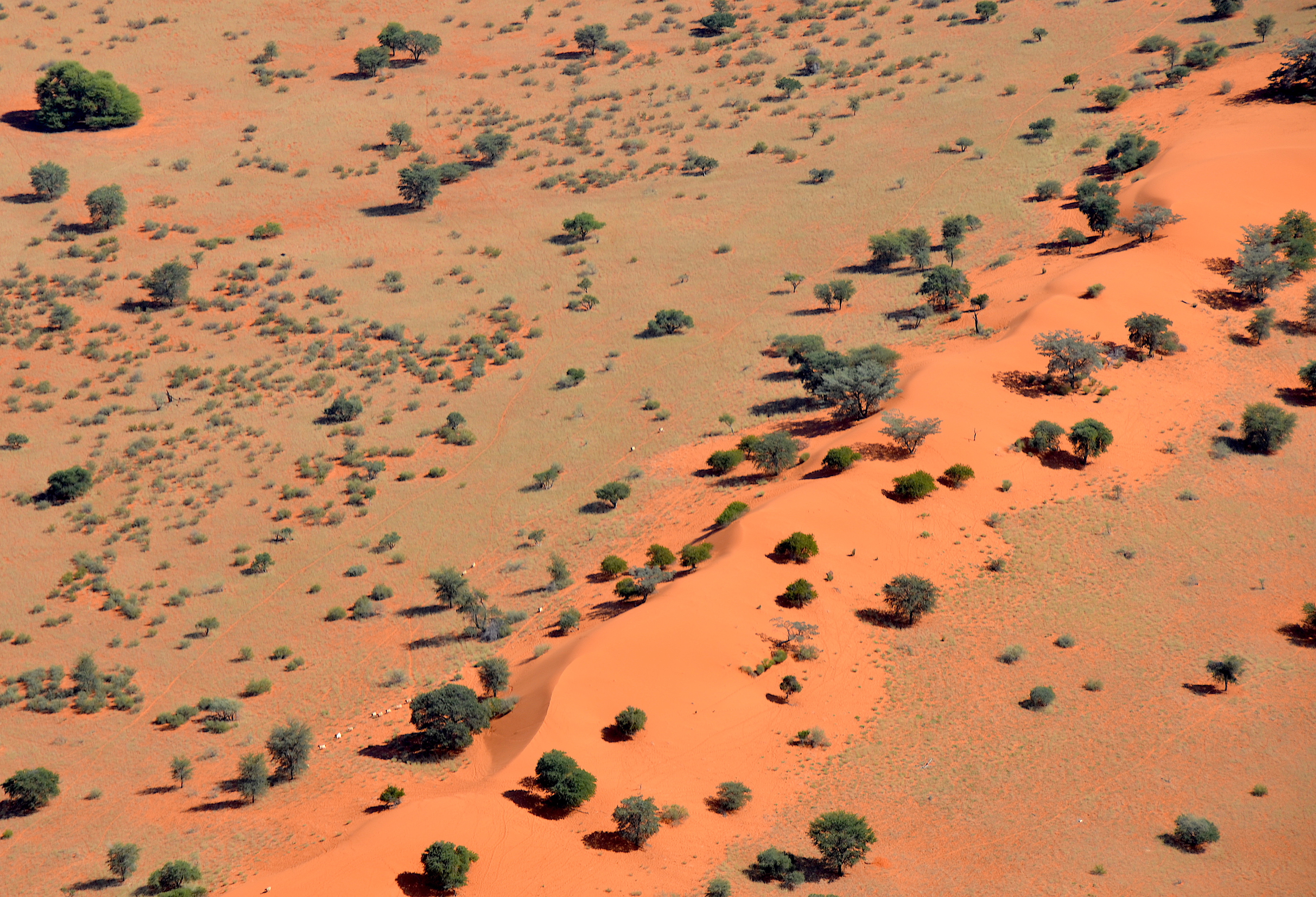
Camel thorn scattered on dunes in the Kalahari Desert in Namibia (2017)

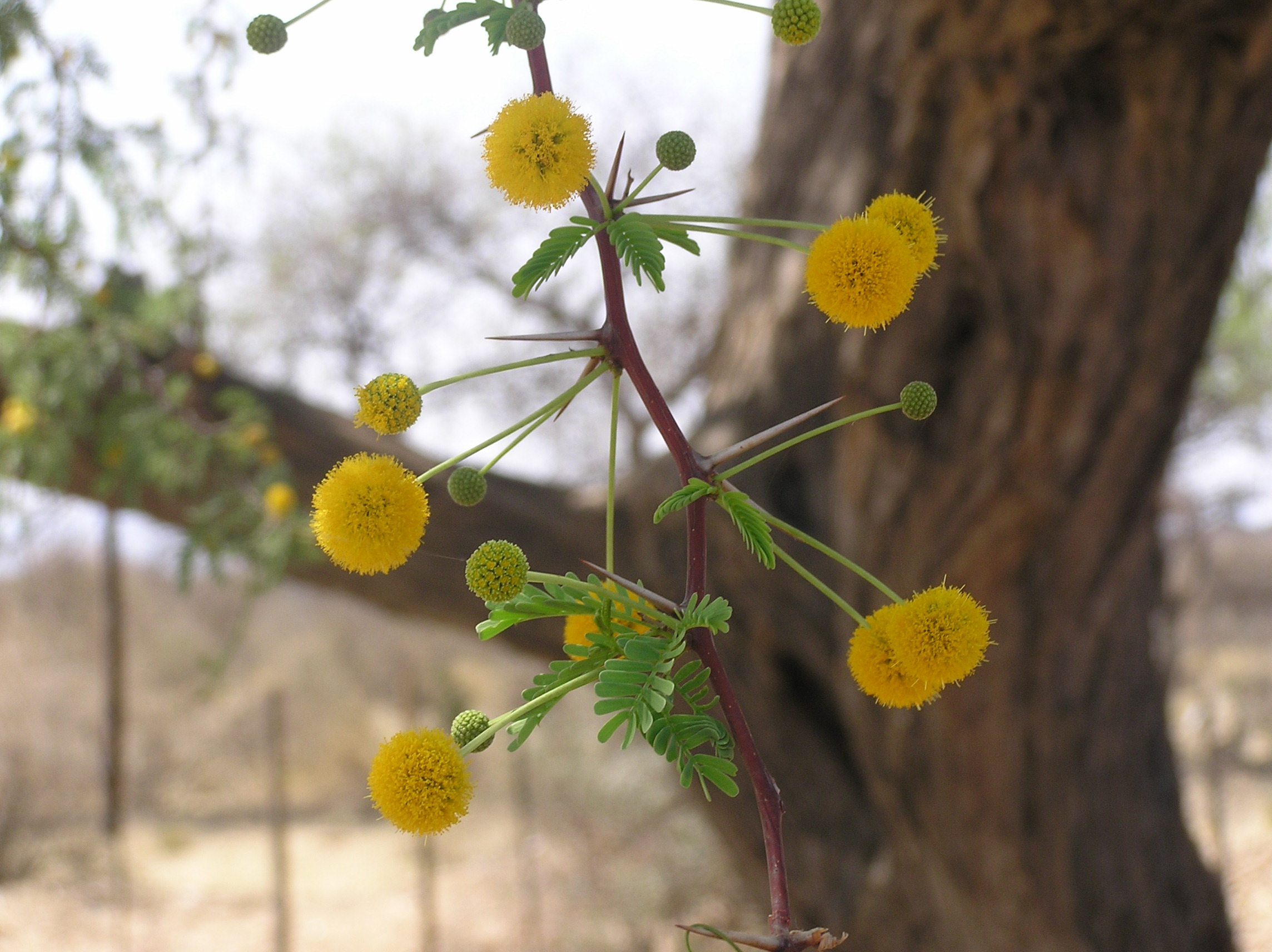
Yellow inflorescences
