= December 2 =

December 2 this year in various calendars
- Wednesday, 2 December 2026
Akan	Nwonawukuo
Armenian	15 Kʿaloch 1476
Aztec	Tozoztontli 1, 2 Ocēlōtl
Babylonian	21 Arakhsamna, 2337 SE
Balinese pawukon	Menga, Beteng, Menala, Pon, Aryang, Buda of Taulu, Uma, Jangur, Sri
Bengali	17 Ogrohayon, BS 1433
Chinese	Yang Metal Dog・Three Stars Mansion; Fire Horse Year, Month 10, Day 24 (Xiaoxue, 5 days until Daxue)
Common Era	2 December 2026 CE
Coptic	23 Hathor, AM 1743
Egyptian	20 Pharmuthi, 2775 NE
Ethiopian	23 H̱edār, 2019 Amätä Məhrät
French Republican	Décade II, Primidi de Frimaire de l'Année 235 de la République
Gregorian	2 December, AD 2026
Hebrew	22 Kislev, AM 5787
Hindu	Pūrvaphalgunī・Viṣkambha; Solar: 16 Mārgaśīrṣa, 1948 SE; Lunisolar: Navamī, Kṛishna pakṣa of Kārtika, 2083 VE; Rāudra・5127 KY・1,872,911
Icelandic	Miðvikudagur, 10 Ýlir 2026
Islamic	21 Jumada al-thani, AH 1448 (using tabular method)
ISO week date	2026-W49-3
Japanese	24 Kannazuki, Reiwa 8 (Shōsetsu, 5 days until Taisetsu)
Julian	19 November, AD 2026 (AM 7535)
Julian day	2461377
Korean	24 Dwaejidal, 4359 DE
Maya	13.0.14.2.14; 7 Mac, 2 Ix
Roman	ante diem XIII Kalendas Decembres, MMDCCLXXIX AUC
Solar Hijri	11 Azar, SH 1405
Tibetan	24 smin drug, me pho rta 2153 or 1772 or 1000

<<	December					>>
Su	Mo	Tu	We	Th	Fr	Sa
		1	2	3	4	5
6	7	8	9	10	11	12
13	14	15	16	17	18	19
20	21	22	23	24	25	26
27	28	29	30	31
2026

December 2 in recent years
2025 (Tuesday)
2024 (Monday)
2023 (Saturday)
2022 (Friday)
2021 (Thursday)
2020 (Wednesday)
2019 (Monday)
2018 (Sunday)
2017 (Saturday)
2016 (Friday)

December 2 is the 336th day of the year (337th in leap years) in the Gregorian calendar; 29 days remain until the end of the year.

== Events ==
=== Pre-1600 ===
- 1244 – Pope Innocent IV arrives at Lyon for the First Council of Lyon.
- 1409 – The University of Leipzig opens.

=== 1601–1900 ===
- 1697 – St Paul's Cathedral, rebuilt to the design of Sir Christopher Wren following the Great Fire of London, is consecrated.
- 1763 – Dedication of the Touro Synagogue, in Newport, Rhode Island, the first synagogue in what will become the United States.
- 1766 – Swedish parliament approves the Swedish Freedom of the Press Act and implements it as a ground law, thus being first in the world with freedom of speech.
- 1804 – At Notre Dame Cathedral in Paris, Napoleon Bonaparte crowns himself Emperor of the French.
- 1805 – War of the Third Coalition: Battle of Austerlitz: French troops under Napoleon decisively defeat a joint Russo-Austrian force.
- 1823 – Monroe Doctrine: In a State of the Union message, U.S. President James Monroe proclaims American neutrality in future European conflicts, and warns European powers not to interfere in the Americas.
- 1845 – Manifest Destiny: In a State of the Union message, U.S. President James K. Polk proposes that the United States should aggressively expand into the West.
- 1848 – Franz Joseph I becomes Emperor of Austria.
- 1851 – French President Louis-Napoléon Bonaparte overthrows the Second Republic.
- 1852 – Louis-Napoléon Bonaparte becomes Emperor of the French as Napoleon III.
- 1859 – Origins of the American Civil War: Militant abolitionist leader John Brown is hanged for his October raid on Harpers Ferry, Virginia (now West Virginia).
- 1865 – Alabama ratifies the 13th Amendment to the U.S. Constitution, followed by North Carolina, then Georgia; U.S. slaves were legally free within two weeks.
- 1867 – At Tremont Temple in Boston, British author Charles Dickens gives his first public reading in the United States.
- 1899 – Philippine–American War: The Battle of Tirad Pass, known as the "Filipino Thermopylae", is fought.

=== 1901–present ===
- 1908 – Puyi becomes Emperor of China at the age of two.
- 1917 – World War I: Russia and the Central Powers sign an armistice at Brest-Litovsk, and peace talks leading to the Treaty of Brest-Litovsk begin.
- 1919 – Ukrainian War of Independence: Ukrainian Bolsheviks attempt to assassinate Nestor Makhno as part of the Polonsky conspiracy.
- 1927 – Following 19 years of Ford Model T production, the Ford Motor Company unveils the Ford Model A as its new automobile.
- 1930 – Great Depression: In a State of the Union message, U.S. President Herbert Hoover proposes a $150 million public works program to help generate jobs and stimulate the economy.
- 1939 – New York City's LaGuardia Airport opens.
- 1942 – World War II: During the Manhattan Project, a team led by Enrico Fermi initiates the first artificial self-sustaining nuclear chain reaction.
- 1943 – World War II: A Luftwaffe bombing raid on the harbour of Bari, Italy, sinks numerous cargo and transport ships, including the American SS John Harvey, which is carrying a stockpile of mustard gas.
- 1947 – Jerusalem Riots of 1947: Arabs riot in Jerusalem in response to the United Nations Partition Plan for Palestine.
- 1949 – Convention for the Suppression of the Traffic in Persons and of the Exploitation of the Prostitution of Others is adopted.
- 1950 – Korean War: The Battle of the Ch'ongch'on River ends with a decisive Chinese victory and UN forces are completely expelled from North Korea.
- 1954 – Cold War: The United States Senate votes 65 to 22 to censure Joseph McCarthy for "conduct that tends to bring the Senate into dishonor and disrepute".
- 1954 – The Sino-American Mutual Defense Treaty, between the United States and Taiwan, is signed in Washington, D.C.
- 1956 – The Granma reaches the shores of Cuba's Oriente Province. Fidel Castro, Che Guevara and 80 other members of the 26th of July Movement disembark to initiate the Cuban Revolution.
- 1957 – United Nations Security Council Resolution 126 relating to the Kashmir conflict is adopted.
- 1961 – In a nationally broadcast speech, Cuban leader Fidel Castro declares that he is a Marxist–Leninist and that Cuba will adopt Communism.
- 1962 – Vietnam War: After a trip to Vietnam at the request of U.S. President John F. Kennedy, U.S. Senate Majority Leader Mike Mansfield becomes the first American official to comment adversely on the war's progress.
- 1968 – Wien Consolidated Airlines Flight 55 crashes into Pedro Bay, Alaska, killing all 39 people on board.
- 1970 – The United States Environmental Protection Agency begins operations.
- 1971 – Abu Dhabi, Ajman, Fujairah, Sharjah, Dubai, and Umm al-Quwain form the United Arab Emirates.
- 1972 – Gough Whitlam is elected the 21st Prime Minister of Australia in the 1972 Australian federal election, defeating William McMahon and leading the Australian Labor Party back into office after 23 years in Opposition.
- 1975 – Laotian Civil War: The Pathet Lao seizes the Laotian capital of Vientiane, forces the abdication of King Sisavang Vatthana, and proclaims the Lao People's Democratic Republic.
- 1976 – Fidel Castro becomes President of Cuba, replacing Osvaldo Dorticós Torrado.
- 1977 – A Tupolev Tu-154 crashes near Benghazi, Libya, killing 59.
- 1980 – Salvadoran Civil War: Four American missionaries are raped and murdered by a death squad.
- 1982 – At the University of Utah, Barney Clark becomes the first person to receive a permanent artificial heart.
- 1988 – Benazir Bhutto is sworn in as Prime Minister of Pakistan, becoming the first woman to head the government of a Muslim-majority state.
- 1988 – Space Shuttle Atlantis is launched on STS-27, a classified mission for the United States Department of Defense.
- 1989 – The Peace Agreement of Hat Yai is signed and ratified by the Malayan Communist Party (MCP) and the governments of Malaysia and Thailand, ending the over two-decade-long communist insurgency in Malaysia.
- 1990 – Space Shuttle Columbia is launched on STS-35, carrying the ASTRO-1 spacelab observatory.
- 1991 – Canada and Poland become the first nations to recognize the independence of Ukraine from the Soviet Union.
- 1992 – Space Shuttle Discovery is launched on STS-53 for the United States Department of Defense.
- 1993 – Colombian drug lord Pablo Escobar is shot and killed by police in Medellín.
- 1993 – Space Shuttle program: STS-61: NASA launches the Space Shuttle Endeavour on a mission to repair the Hubble Space Telescope.
- 1999 – The United Kingdom devolves political power in Northern Ireland to the Northern Ireland Executive following the Good Friday Agreement.
- 2001 – Enron files for Chapter 11 bankruptcy.
- 2015 – San Bernardino attack: Syed Rizwan Farook and Tashfeen Malik kill 14 people and wound 22 at the Inland Regional Center in San Bernardino, California.
- 2016 – Thirty-six people die in a fire at a converted Oakland, California, warehouse serving as an artist collective.
- 2020 – Cannabis is removed from the list of most dangerous drugs of the international drug control treaty by the UN Commission on Narcotic Drugs.

== Births ==
=== Pre-1600 ===
- 503 – Emperor Jianwen of Liang, emperor of the Chinese Liang dynasty (died 551)
- 1501 – Queen Munjeong, Korean queen (died 1565)
- 1578 – Agostino Agazzari, Italian composer and theorist (died 1641)
- 1599 – Thomas Bruce, 1st Earl of Elgin, Scottish nobleman (died 1663)

=== 1601–1900 ===
- 1629 – Wilhelm Egon von Fürstenberg, Catholic cardinal (died 1704)
- 1694 – William Shirley, English-American lawyer and politician, Governor of the province of Massachusetts Bay (died 1771)
- 1703 – Ferdinand Konščak, Croatian missionary and explorer (died 1759)
- 1738 – Richard Montgomery, Irish-American general (died 1775)
- 1754 – William Cooper, American judge and politician, founded Cooperstown, New York (died 1809)
- 1759 – James Edward Smith, English botanist and mycologist, founded the Linnean Society (died 1828)
- 1760 – John Breckinridge, American soldier, lawyer, and politician, 5th United States Attorney General (died 1806)
- 1760 – Joseph Graetz, German organist, composer, and educator (died 1826)
- 1798 – António Luís de Seabra, 1st Viscount of Seabra, Portuguese magistrate and politician (died 1895)
- 1810 – Henry Yesler, American businessman and politician, 7th Mayor of Seattle (died 1892)
- 1811 – Jean-Charles Chapais, Canadian farmer and politician, 1st Canadian Minister of Agriculture (died 1885)
- 1817 – Heinrich von Sybel, German historian, academic, and politician (died 1895)
- 1825 – Pedro II of Brazil (died 1891)
- 1827 – William Burges, English architect and designer (died 1881)
- 1846 – Pierre Waldeck-Rousseau, French lawyer and politician, 68th Prime Minister of France (died 1904)
- 1847 – Deacon White, American baseball player and manager (died 1939)
- 1859 – Kateryna Melnyk-Antonovych, Ukrainian historian and archaeologist (died 1942)
- 1859 – Georges Seurat, French painter (died 1891)
- 1860 – Charles Studd, England cricketer and missionary (died 1931)
- 1863 – Charles Edward Ringling, American businessman, co-founded the Ringling Brothers Circus (died 1926)
- 1866 – Harry Burleigh, American singer-songwriter (died 1949)
- 1876 – Yusuf Akçura, Tatar-Turkish activist and ideologue of Turanism (died 1935)
- 1877 – Cahir Healy, Northern Irish Anti Partitionist, writer and politician (died 1970)
- 1884 – Erima Harvey Northcroft, New Zealand soldier, lawyer, and judge (died 1953)
- 1884 – Yahya Kemal Beyatlı, Turkish poet and author (died 1958)
- 1885 – George Minot, American physician and academic, Nobel Prize laureate (died 1950)
- 1891 – Otto Dix, German painter and illustrator (died 1969)
- 1891 – Charles H. Wesley, American historian and author (died 1987)
- 1894 – Warren William, American actor (died 1948)
- 1895 – Harriet Cohen, English pianist (died 1967)
- 1897 – Ivan Bagramyan, Russian general (died 1982)
- 1897 – Rewi Alley, New Zealand writer and political activist (died 1987)
- 1898 – Indra Lal Roy, Indian lieutenant and first Indian fighter aircraft pilot (died 1918)
- 1899 – John Barbirolli, English cellist and conductor (died 1970)
- 1899 – John Cobb, English race car driver and pilot (died 1952)
- 1899 – Ray Morehart, American baseball player (died 1989)
- 1900 – Elisa Godínez Gómez de Batista, former First Lady of Cuba (died 1993)
- 1900 – Herta Hammerbacher, German landscape architect and professor (died 1985)

=== 1901–present ===
- 1901 – Raimundo Orsi, Argentinian-Italian footballer (died 1986)
- 1905 – Khan Bahadur Abdul Hakim, Bangladeshi mathematician (died 1985)
- 1906 – Peter Carl Goldmark, Hungarian-American engineer (died 1977)
- 1909 – Arvo Askola, Finnish runner (died 1975)
- 1909 – Walenty Kłyszejko, Estonian–Polish basketball player and coach (died 1987)
- 1909 – Joseph P. Lash, American activist and author (died 1987)
- 1910 – Russell Lynes, American photographer, historian, and author (died 1991)
- 1910 – Taisto Mäki, Finnish runner (died 1979)
- 1911 – Meng Qingshu, Chinese politician (died 1983)
- 1912 – George Emmett, English cricketer and coach (died 1976)
- 1913 – Marc Platt, American actor, singer, and dancer (died 2014)
- 1914 – Bill Erwin, American actor (died 2010)
- 1914 – Adolph Green, American playwright and composer (died 2002)
- 1915 – Takahito, Prince Mikasa of Japan (died 2016)
- 1916 – Howard Finster, American minister and painter (died 2001)
- 1917 – Sylvia Syms, American singer (died 1992)
- 1921 – Carlo Furno, Italian cardinal (died 2015)
- 1922 – Iakovos Kambanelis, Greek author, poet, and screenwriter (died 2011)
- 1923 – Maria Callas, American-Greek soprano and actress (died 1977)
- 1924 – Jonathan Frid, Canadian actor (died 2012)
- 1924 – Alexander Haig, American general and politician, 59th United States Secretary of State (died 2010)
- 1924 – Else Marie Pade, Danish composer (died 2016)
- 1924 – Vilgot Sjöman, Swedish actor, director, producer, and screenwriter (died 2006)
- 1925 – Julie Harris, American actress (died 2013)
- 1927 – Ralph Beard, American basketball player (died 2007)
- 1928 – Guy Bourdin, French photographer (died 1991)
- 1929 – Dan Jenkins, American journalist and author (died 2019)
- 1929 – Leon Litwack, American historian and author (died 2021)
- 1930 – Gary Becker, American economist and academic, Nobel Prize laureate (died 2014)
- 1930 – David Piper, English race car driver
- 1931 – Nigel Calder, English journalist, author, and screenwriter (died 2014)
- 1931 – Masaaki Hatsumi, Japanese martial artist and educator, founded Bujinkan
- 1931 – Wynton Kelly, American pianist and composer (died 1971)
- 1931 – Edwin Meese, American lawyer, 75th United States Attorney General
- 1931 – Gareth Wigan, British film studio executive (died 2010)
- 1933 – Peter Robin Harding, English marshal and pilot (died 2021)
- 1933 – Mike Larrabee, American sprinter and educator (died 2003)
- 1934 – Tarcisio Bertone, Italian cardinal
- 1935 – David Hackett Fischer, American historian, author, and academic
- 1937 – Manohar Joshi, Indian lawyer and politician, 15th Chief Minister of Maharashtra (died 2024)
- 1939 – Yael Dayan, Israeli journalist, author, and politician
- 1939 – Francis Fox, Canadian lawyer and politician, 48th Secretary of State for Canada (died 2024)
- 1939 – Harry Reid, American lawyer and politician, 25th Lieutenant Governor of Nevada (died 2021)
- 1940 – Willie Brown, American football player, coach, and manager (died 2019)
- 1941 – Mike England, Welsh footballer and manager
- 1941 – Tom McGuinness, English guitarist, songwriter, author, and producer
- 1942 – Anna G. Jónasdóttir, Icelandic political scientist and academic
- 1943 – Wayne Allard, American veterinarian and politician
- 1944 – Cathy Lee Crosby, American actress and tennis player
- 1944 – Ibrahim Rugova, Kosovan journalist and politician, 1st President of Kosovo (died 2006)
- 1944 – Dionysis Savvopoulos, Greek singer-songwriter (died 2025)
- 1944 – Botho Strauß, German author and playwright
- 1945 – Penelope Spheeris, American director, producer, and screenwriter
- 1945 – Alan Thomson, Australian cricketer (died 2022)
- 1946 – John Banks, New Zealand businessman and politician, 38th Mayor of Auckland City
- 1946 – David Macaulay, English-American author and illustrator
- 1946 – Gianni Versace, Italian fashion designer, founded Versace (died 1997)
- 1947 – Isaac Bitton, Moroccan-French drummer and songwriter
- 1947 – Tommy Jenkins, English footballer and manager
- 1947 – Ivan Atanassov Petrov, Bulgarian neurologist and author
- 1948 – Elizabeth Berg, American nurse and author
- 1948 – T. Coraghessan Boyle, American novelist and short story writer
- 1948 – Patricia Hewitt, Australian-English educator and politician, English Secretary of State for Health
- 1948 – Toninho Horta, Brazilian guitarist and composer
- 1948 – Antonín Panenka, Czech footballer
- 1950 – John Wesley Ryles, American country music singer-songwriter and guitarist
- 1950 – Amin Saikal, Afghan-Australian political scientist and academic
- 1950 – Benjamin Stora, Algerian-French historian and author
- 1950 – Paul Watson, Canadian activist, founded the Sea Shepherd Conservation Society
- 1952 – Carol Shea-Porter, American social worker, academic, and politician
- 1952 – Keith Szarabajka, American actor
- 1953 – Pertti Sveholm, Finnish actor
- 1954 – Dan Butler, American actor, director, and screenwriter
- 1956 – Steven Bauer, Cuban-American actor and producer
- 1957 – Dagfinn Høybråten, Norwegian political scientist and politician, Norwegian Minister of Health
- 1958 – Randy Gardner, American figure skater
- 1958 – Andrew George, English politician
- 1958 – Vladimir Parfenovich, Belarusian canoe racer and politician
- 1958 – George Saunders, American short story writer and essayist
- 1959 – Kelefa Diallo, Guinean general (died 2013)
- 1960 – Peter Blakeley, Australian singer-songwriter and guitarist
- 1960 – Deb Haaland, American politician, 54th United States Secretary of the Interior
- 1960 – Razzle, English rock drummer (died 1984)
- 1960 – Rick Savage, English singer-songwriter and bass player
- 1960 – Silk Smitha, Indian film actress
- 1962 – John Dyegh, Nigerian businessman and politician
- 1963 – Brendan Coyle, English actor
- 1963 – Ann Patchett, American author
- 1963 – Rich Sutter, Canadian ice hockey player and scout
- 1963 – Ron Sutter, Canadian ice hockey player and coach
- 1965 – Shane Flanagan, Australian rugby league player and coach
- 1966 – Philippe Etchebest, French chef and television host
- 1966 – Jinsei Shinzaki, Japanese wrestler and promoter, co-founded Sendai Girls' Pro Wrestling
- 1967 – Mary Creagh, English scholar and politician, Shadow Secretary of State for Transport
- 1968 – David Batty, English footballer
- 1968 – Jiří Dopita, Czech ice hockey player
- 1968 – Darryl Kile, American baseball player (died 2002)
- 1968 – Lucy Liu, American actress and producer
- 1968 – Nate Mendel, American singer-songwriter and bass player
- 1968 – Rena Sofer, American actress
- 1969 – Ulrika Bergquist, Swedish journalist
- 1969 – Chris Kiwomya, English footballer
- 1969 – Pavel Loskutov, Estonian runner
- 1969 – Tanya Plibersek, Australian journalist and politician, 45th Australian Minister of Health
- 1970 – Joe Lo Truglio, American actor and comedian
- 1970 – Maksim Tarasov, Russian pole vaulter
- 1970 – Treach, American rapper and actor
- 1971 – Wilson Jermaine Heredia, American actor and singer
- 1971 – Rachel McQuillan, Australian tennis player
- 1971 – Jüri Reinvere, Estonian-German composer and poet
- 1971 – Francesco Toldo, Italian footballer
- 1971 – Mine Yoshizaki, Japanese illustrator
- 1972 – Alan Henderson, American basketball player
- 1972 – Sergei Zholtok, Latvian ice hockey player (died 2004)
- 1973 – Graham Kavanagh, Irish footballer and manager
- 1973 – Monica Seles, Serbian-American tennis player
- 1973 – Lee Steele, English footballer
- 1973 – Jan Ullrich, German cyclist
- 1975 – Mark Kotsay, American baseball player and manager
- 1976 – Masafumi Gotoh, Japanese singer-songwriter, guitarist, and producer
- 1977 – Siyabonga Nomvethe, South African footballer
- 1978 – Jarron Collins, American basketball player and coach
- 1978 – Jason Collins, American basketball player (died 2026)
- 1978 – Nelly Furtado, Canadian singer-songwriter, producer, and actress
- 1978 – Luigi Malafronte, Italian footballer
- 1978 – Peter Moylan, Australian baseball player
- 1978 – Maëlle Ricker, Canadian snowboarder
- 1978 – David Rivas, Spanish footballer
- 1978 – Andrew Ryan, Australian rugby league player and sportscaster
- 1978 – Chris Wolstenholme, English singer-songwriter and bass player
- 1979 – Yvonne Catterfeld, German singer-songwriter and actress
- 1979 – Michael McIndoe, Scottish footballer
- 1979 – Abdul Razzaq, Pakistani cricketer
- 1980 – Adam Kreek, Canadian rower
- 1980 – Darryn Randall, South African cricketer (died 2013)
- 1980 – Joel Ward, Canadian ice hockey player
- 1981 – Maria Ferekidi, Greek canoe racer
- 1981 – Eric Jungmann, American actor
- 1981 – Thomas Pöck, Austrian ice hockey player
- 1981 – Danijel Pranjić, Croatian footballer
- 1981 – Britney Spears, American singer-songwriter, dancer, and actress
- 1982 – Christos Karipidis, Greek footballer
- 1982 – Matt Walsh, American basketball player
- 1983 – Action Bronson, American rapper, songwriter, chef, and television host
- 1983 – Chris Burke, Scottish footballer
- 1983 – Bibiana Candelas, Mexican volleyball player
- 1983 – Jaime Durán, Mexican footballer
- 1983 – Eugene Jeter, American-Ukrainian basketball player, coach, and executive
- 1983 – Jana Kramer, American actress and singer
- 1983 – Aaron Rodgers, American football player
- 1983 – Daniela Ruah, Portuguese-American actress
- 1984 – Péter Máté, Hungarian footballer
- 1985 – Amaury Leveaux, French swimmer
- 1985 – Dorell Wright, American basketball player
- 1986 – Song Ha-yoon, South Korean actress
- 1986 – Claudiu Keșerü, Romanian footballer
- 1986 – Renee Montgomery, American basketball player and executive
- 1986 – Tal Wilkenfeld, Australian bass player and composer
- 1988 – Alfred Enoch, English actor
- 1988 – Stephen McGinn, Scottish footballer
- 1989 – Etta Bond, English singer-songwriter
- 1989 – Matteo Darmian, Italian footballer
- 1989 – Cassie Steele, Canadian singer-songwriter and actress
- 1989 – Robert Turbin, American football player
- 1990 – Emmanuel Agyemang-Badu, Ghanaian footballer
- 1990 – Gastón Ramírez, Uruguayan footballer
- 1991 – Chloé Dufour-Lapointe, Canadian skier
- 1991 – Brandon Knight, American basketball player
- 1991 – Charlie Puth, American singer-songwriter and pianist
- 1992 – Sim Bhullar, Canadian basketball player
- 1992 – Gary Sánchez, Dominican baseball player
- 1993 – Haruka Ishida, Japanese singer and actress
- 1993 – Kostas Stafylidis, Greek footballer
- 1994 – Zach Cunningham, American football player
- 1994 – Aaron Jones, American football player
- 1994 – Elias Lindholm, Swedish ice hockey player
- 1994 – Fumika Shimizu, Japanese actress and model
- 1994 – Tomokaze Yūta, Japanese sumo wrestler
- 1995 – Uladzislau Hancharou, Belarusian trampolinist
- 1995 – Inori Minase, Japanese actress, voice actress and singer
- 1996 – Jake Doran, Australian cricketer
- 1997 – De'Andre Hunter, American basketball player
- 1998 – Annalise Basso, American actress
- 1998 – Anna Kalinskaya, Russian tennis player
- 1998 – Juice Wrld, American rapper, singer and songwriter (died 2019)
- 2003 – Neil Erasmus, South African-Australian footballer
- 2004 – Ilia Malinin, American competitive figure skater
- 2005 – Learner Tien, American tennis player

== Deaths ==
=== Pre-1600 ===
- 537 – Pope Silverius
- 930 – Ma Yin, Chinese warlord, king of Chu (Ten Kingdoms) (born 853)
- 949 – Odo of Wetterau, German nobleman
- 1022 – Elvira Menéndez, queen of Alfonso V of Castile (born 996)
- 1255 – Muhammad III of Alamut, Nizari Ismaili Imam
- 1340 – Geoffrey le Scrope, Chief Justice of King Edward III of England
- 1348 – Emperor Hanazono of Japan (born 1297)
- 1381 – John of Ruusbroec, Flemish priest and mystic (born 1293)
- 1455 – Isabel of Coimbra, queen of Portugal (born 1432)
- 1463 – Albert VI, Archduke of Austria (born 1418)
- 1469 – Piero di Cosimo de' Medici, Italian banker and politician (born 1416)
- 1510 – Muhammad Shaybani, Khan of Bukhara (born 1451)
- 1515 – Gonzalo Fernández de Córdoba, Spanish general (born 1453)
- 1547 – Hernán Cortés, Spanish general and explorer (born 1485)
- 1594 – Gerardus Mercator, Flemish mathematician, cartographer, and philosopher (born 1512)

=== 1601–1900 ===
- 1615 – Louis des Balbes de Berton de Crillon, French general (born 1541)
- 1665 – Catherine de Vivonne, marquise de Rambouillet, French author (born 1588)
- 1694 – Pierre Puget, French painter, sculptor, and architect (born 1622)
- 1719 – Pasquier Quesnel, French theologian and author (born 1634)
- 1723 – Philippe II, Duke of Orléans (born 1674)
- 1726 – Samuel Penhallow, English-American historian and author (born 1665)
- 1747 – Vincent Bourne, English poet and scholar (born 1695)
- 1748 – Charles Seymour, 6th Duke of Somerset, English politician, Lord President of the Council (born 1662)
- 1774 – Johann Friedrich Agricola, German organist and composer (born 1720)
- 1814 – Marquis de Sade, French philosopher, author, and politician (born 1740)
- 1844 – Eustachy Erazm Sanguszko, Polish general and politician (born 1768)
- 1849 – Adelaide of Saxe-Meiningen, Queen Consort of the United Kingdom and Hanover (born 1792)
- 1859 – John Brown, American abolitionist (born 1800)
- 1881 – Jenny von Westphalen, German author (born 1814)
- 1885 – Allen Wright, Principal chief of the Choctaw Nation (1866–1870); proposed the name "Oklahoma", from Choctaw words okra and umma, meaning "Territory of the Red People". (born 1826)
- 1888 – Namık Kemal, Turkish journalist, poet, and playwright (born 1840)
- 1892 – Jay Gould, American businessman and financier (born 1836)
- 1899 – Gregorio del Pilar, Filipino general and politician, 1st Governor of Bulacan (born 1875)

=== 1901–present ===
- 1918 – Edmond Rostand, French poet and playwright (born 1868)
- 1924 – Kazimieras Būga, Lithuanian linguist and philologist (born 1879)
- 1927 – Paul Heinrich von Groth, German scientist who systematically classified minerals and founded the journal Zeitschrift für Krystallographie und Mineralogie (born 1843)
- 1931 – Vincent d'Indy, French composer and educator (born 1851)
- 1936 – John Ringling, American businessman, co-founded Ringling Brothers Circus (born 1866)
- 1943 – Nordahl Grieg, Norwegian journalist and author (born 1902)
- 1944 – Josef Lhévinne, Russian pianist and educator (born 1874)
- 1944 – Filippo Tommaso Marinetti, Egyptian-Italian poet and composer (born 1876)
- 1944 – Eiji Sawamura, Japanese baseball player and soldier (born 1917)
- 1950 – Dinu Lipatti, Romanian pianist and composer (born 1917)
- 1953 – Reginald Baker, Australian rugby player (born 1884)
- 1953 – Trần Trọng Kim, Vietnamese historian, scholar, and politician, Prime Minister of Vietnam (born 1883)
- 1957 – Harrison Ford, American actor (born 1884)
- 1957 – Manfred Sakel, Ukrainian-American neurophysiologist and psychiatrist (born 1902)
- 1966 – L. E. J. Brouwer, Dutch mathematician and philosopher (born 1881)
- 1966 – Giles Cooper, Irish author, playwright, and screenwriter (born 1918)
- 1967 – Francis Spellman, American cardinal (born 1889).
- 1969 – José María Arguedas, Peruvian anthropologist, author, and poet (born 1911)
- 1969 – Kliment Voroshilov, Ukrainian-Russian marshal and politician, 3rd Head of State of The Soviet Union (born 1881)
- 1974 – Sylvi Kekkonen, Finnish writer and wife of President of Finland Urho Kekkonen (born 1900)
- 1974 – Max Weber, Swiss lawyer and politician (born 1897)
- 1976 – Danny Murtaugh, American baseball player and manager (born 1917)
- 1980 – Chaudhry Muhammad Ali, Indian-Pakistani lawyer and politician, 4th Prime Minister of Pakistan (born 1905)
- 1980 – Romain Gary, Lithuanian-French author, director, and screenwriter (born 1914)
- 1981 – Wallace Harrison, American architect, co-founded Harrison & Abramovitz (born 1895)
- 1982 – Marty Feldman, English actor and comedian (born 1934)
- 1982 – Giovanni Ferrari, Italian footballer and manager (born 1907)
- 1983 – Fifi D'Orsay, Canadian-American actress and singer (born 1904)
- 1985 – Philip Larkin, English poet, author, and librarian (born 1922)
- 1986 – Desi Arnaz, Cuban-American actor, singer, businessman, and television producer (born 1917)
- 1986 – John Curtis Gowan, American psychologist and academic (born 1912)
- 1987 – Luis Federico Leloir, French-Argentinian physician and biochemist, Nobel Prize laureate (born 1906)
- 1987 – Yakov Borisovich Zel'dovich, Belarusian physicist, astronomer, and cosmologist (born 1914)
- 1988 – Karl-Heinz Bürger, German colonel (born 1904)
- 1988 – Tata Giacobetti, Italian singer-songwriter (born 1922)
- 1990 – Aaron Copland, American composer and conductor (born 1900)
- 1990 – Robert Cummings, American actor, director, and producer (born 1908)
- 1993 – Pablo Escobar, Colombian drug lord (born 1949)
- 1995 – Robertson Davies, Canadian author, playwright, and critic (born 1913)
- 1995 – Roxie Roker, American actress (born 1929)
- 1995 – Mária Telkes, Hungarian–American biophysicist and chemist (born 1900)
- 1997 – Shirley Crabtree, English wrestler (born 1930)
- 1997 – Michael Hedges, American singer-songwriter and guitarist (born 1953)
- 1999 – Charlie Byrd, American guitarist (born 1925)
- 2000 – Gail Fisher, American actress (born 1935)
- 2002 – Ivan Illich, Austrian priest and philosopher (born 1926)
- 2002 – Arno Peters, German cartographer and historian (born 1916)
- 2003 – Alan Davidson, British soldier, historian, and author (born 1924)
- 2004 – Alicia Markova, English ballerina and choreographer (born 1910)
- 2004 – Mona Van Duyn, American poet and academic (born 1921)
- 2005 – William P. Lawrence, American admiral and pilot (born 1930)
- 2005 – Van Tuong Nguyen, Australian convicted drug trafficker (born 1980)
- 2006 – Mariska Veres, Dutch singer (born 1947)
- 2007 – Jennifer Alexander, Canadian-American ballerina and actress (born 1972)
- 2007 – Elizabeth Hardwick, American literary critic, novelist, and short story writer (born 1916)
- 2008 – Odetta, American singer-songwriter, guitarist, and actress (born 1930)
- 2008 – Henry Molaison, American memory disorder patient (born 1926)
- 2008 – Edward Samuel Rogers, Canadian lawyer and businessman (born 1933)
- 2008 – Renato de Grandis, Italian composer, musicologist, and writer (born 1927)
- 2009 – Foge Fazio, American football player and coach (born 1938)
- 2009 – Eric Woolfson, Scottish singer-songwriter, pianist, and producer (born 1945)
- 2012 – Tom Hendry, Canadian playwright, co-founded the Manitoba Theatre Centre (born 1929)
- 2012 – Ehsan Naraghi, Iranian sociologist and author (born 1926)
- 2013 – William Allain, American soldier and politician, 58th Governor of Mississippi (born 1928)
- 2013 – Jean-Claude Beton, Algerian-French engineer and businessman, founded Orangina (born 1925)
- 2013 – Marcelo Déda, Brazilian lawyer and politician (born 1960)
- 2013 – Junior Murvin, Jamaican singer-songwriter (born 1946)
- 2014 – A. R. Antulay, Indian lawyer and politician, 8th Chief Minister of Maharashtra (born 1929)
- 2014 – Jean Béliveau, Canadian ice hockey player (born 1931)
- 2014 – Josie Cichockyj, English basketball player and coach (born 1964)
- 2014 – Bobby Keys, American saxophonist (born 1943)
- 2014 – Don Laws, American figure skater and coach (born 1929)
- 2015 – Sandy Berger, American lawyer and politician, 19th United States National Security Advisor (born 1945)
- 2015 – Will McMillan, American actor, director, and producer (born 1944)
- 2015 – George T. Sakato, American soldier, Medal of Honor recipient (born 1921)
- 2020 – Pat Patterson, American wrestler (born 1941)
- 2024 – Ed Botterell, Canadian Olympic sailor (born 1931)
- 2024 – Helmut Duckadam, Romanian footballer (born 1959)
- 2024 – Neale Fraser, Australian tennis player (born 1933)
- 2024 – Paul Maslansky, American film producer and writer (born 1933)
- 2024 – Debbie Mathers, Mother of Eminem (born 1955)
- 2024 – Israel Vázquez, Mexican boxer (born 1977)

== Holidays and observances ==
- Armed Forces Day (Cuba)
- Christian feast day:
  - Avitus of Rouen
  - Bibiana
  - Channing Moore Williams (Anglicanism)
  - Chromatius
  - Habakkuk
  - Blessed Ivan Slezyuk
  - Blessed Maria Angela Astorch
  - December 2 (Eastern Orthodox liturgics)
- International Day for the Abolition of Slavery (United Nations)
- Lao National Day
- National Day (United Arab Emirates)
- Chichibu Night Festival
