= Stefka =

Stefka (Bulgarian: Стефка) is a feminine given name. Notable people with the name include:

- Stefka Evstatieva (1947–2025), Bulgarian operatic soprano
- Stefka Koleva (born 1954), Bulgarian rower
- Stefka Kostadinova (born 1965), Bulgarian high jumper
- Stefka Madina (born 1963), Bulgarian rower
- Stefka Petrova (born 1950), Bulgarian nutritionist
- Stefka Savova (born 1958), Bulgarian chess player
- Stefka Yordanova (1947–2011), Bulgarian runner

== See also ==
- Štefka
