= Botterell =

Botterell is a surname. Notable people with the surname include:

- Ed Botterell (1931–2024), Canadian sailor
- Harry Botterell (1906–1997), Canadian neurosurgeon and academic administrator
- Henry Botterell (1896–2003), Canadian fighter pilot
- Rob Botterell, Canadian politician
