= TV4-nyheterna =

- The former programme titles
- Created by: TV4 Group
- Presented by: Anders Kraft; Ulrika Nilsson; Peter Lindgren; Ulrika Bergquist; Thomas Ritter; Johan Macéus
- Country of origin: Sweden
- Original language: Swedish

Production
- Production location: Stockholm

Original release
- Network: TV4 Group
- Release: 15 September 1990 – present

Nyheterna ("the News") is the name of the news programme of the Swedish channel TV4. Unlike most other programmes on TV4, Nyheterna is produced in-house by the TV4 Group themselves.

The main bulletins are broadcast at 7 and 10pm every day of the week. News are also broadcast in the morning on Nyhetsmorgon and throughout the day in news updates on TV4, TV4 Play and TV4.se.

== History ==
Nyheterna was launched on 15 September 1990, the same day that TV4 launched, broadcasting two editions every day at 7 and 10pm.

In 1992, the TV4 Group started broadcast a breakfast television programme, initially called Gomorron ("Good Morning"), but soon renamed Nyhetsmorgon ("News Morning"), with news from Nyheterna every half-hour.

In 1993, the evening news bulletins was moved to 7:30pm, in an attempt to compete with the most popular news bulletin, Rapport on TV2, which had been broadcasting in that slot since the 1970s. This attempt failed and some years later, Nyheterna moved to 6:30pm, broadcasting after the local news.

Rapport and Nyheterna launched lunchtime news bulletins simultaneously in the autumn of 1997. None were successful, and TV4 shortened the bulletin and moved it to 1pm some years later. News updates at 3 and 5pm also existed, but all daytime news updates had seized a few years into the 2000s.

The evening bulletin was moved from 6:30 to the original 7pm slot in 2004. In the autumn of 2004, TV4 launched several daily news updates broadcast in TV4, TV4 Plus, TV4 Fakta and to mobile phones.

On 16 April 2007 Nyheterna moved into a new studio, got the graphics and switched to widescreen transmissions.

A news broadcast on Nyheterna appears in the 2011 movie The Girl with the Dragon Tattoo.
