= November 19 (Eastern Orthodox liturgics) =

Day in the Eastern Orthodox liturgical calendar

Eastern Orthodox liturgical calendar
November 18	November 19	November 20
November 19 O.S. ≍ December 2 N.S. November 19 N.S ≍ November 6 O.S.

An Eastern Orthodox cross

November 19 in Eastern Orthodox liturgical calendars is a feast day and a day of commemoration of saints and martyrs. Although some Orthodox churches use the Revised Julian Calendar and others use the traditional Julian calendar, the fixed commemorations for their respective November 19 are broadly the same, no matter which calendar is used. (Note: Despite the dates being the same, the days to which they refer typically differ by 13 days. The notation Old Style or O.S. is sometimes used to indicate a date in the traditional Julian Calendar (the "Old Calendar"). The notation New Style or N.S. indicates a date in the Revised Julian calendar (the "New Calendar").)

== Saints ==
- Prophet Obadiah (Abdia, Abdias) (9th century BC) (Note: "At Samaria, the holy prophet Abdias.")
- Martyr Heliodorus in Pamphylia (273)
- Martyr Azes of Isauria, and with him 150 soldiers (284) (Note: "In Isauria, the martyrdom of Saint Azas and his military companions, to the number of one hundred and fifty, under the emperor Diocletian and the tribune Aquilinus.")
- Holy 12 soldier-martyrs
- Martyr Barlaam of Caesarea in Cappadocia (304) (Note: "At Caesarea, in Cappadocia, St. Barlaam, martyr, who, though unpolished and ignorant, yet armed with the wisdom of Christ, overcame the tyrant, and, by the constancy of his faith, subdued fire itself. On his birthday, St. Basil the Great delivered a celebrated discourse.")
- Martyr Agapius of Caesarea in Palaestina (306)
- Martyrs Anthimus, Thallelaius, Christopher, Euphemia, and her children (see also: November 22)
- Martyr Pancharius
- Venerables Barlaam the monk and Ioasaph (Joasaph, Josaphat), prince of India, and his father Abenner the King (4th century)
- Venerable Hilarion the Iberian of Georgia, monk, Wonderworker of Thessalonica (875) (see also: November 13)
- Venerable Simon, Wonderworker of Calabria (10th century) (Note: His memory is not recorded in either the Menaia or in the Synaxarion of Nicodemus. It is preserved only in Parisian Codex 1621 (14th century), in Greek as follows: (in Greek) Οὗτος ἣν ἐκ Καλαβρίας μοναχὸς μονῆς μεγάλης καὶ θαυμαστής, ὄτε ποτὲ ἐστάλησαν εἰς διακονίαν μοναχοί τινες ἐκ τῆς μονῆς παρὰ τὴν θάλασσαν συνελήφθησαν ὑπὸ πειρατῶν Τούρκων καὶ ὡδηγήθησαν εἰς τὴν Ἀφρικήν. Πρὸς ἐξαγορὰν τῶν αἰχμαλώτων ἀδελφῶν ἐλθῶν οὗτος καὶ εὕρων αὐτοὺς διηρώτα ἐν συγκινήσει τὰ κατ’ αὐτούς, ὄτε πλησιάσας Ἀγαρηνὸς ἐξέτεινε τὴν χείρα αὐτοῦ νὰ ραπίση τὸν Ὅσιον, ἀλλ’ ἐξηράνθη ἡ χεὶρ αὐτοῦ. Τὸ αὐτὸ ἐπανελήφθη καὶ εἰς τὸν δεύτερον ἐλθόντα, ὄτε οἱ ἄλλοι οἱ μετ’ αὐτοῦ ἀπήγαγαν αὐτὸν εἰς τὸν ἄρχοντα τοῦ τόπου καὶ διηγήθησαν τὰ διατρέξαντα, ἐκ τούτων ὁ ἄρχων κατεπλάγη καὶ παρεκάλεσε τὸν Ὅσιον δι’ εὐχῆς ν’ ἀποκαταστήσει τὰς ἐξηραμένας τῶν στρατιωτῶν χείρας, καὶ τούτου γενομένου, διέταξε νὰ μεταφέρωσιν ἐν τιμῇ τοὺς αἰχμαλώτους μοναχοὺς εἰς τὸν τόπον αὐτῶν. Κατὰ δὲ τὸ ταξίδιον, ἀπολιπόντος τοῦ ὕδατος διὰ προσευχῆς τὸ τῆς θαλάσσης ὕδωρ μετέβαλεν εἰς γλυκύτητα ὅπερ ἐκίνησεν εἰς θαυμασμὸν τοὺς ἀπίστους ἐγένετο αὐτουργὸς καὶ ἄλλων θαυμάτων καὶ ἐκοιμήθη ἐν εἰρήνῃ (Ἁγιολόγιο Σ. Εὐστρατιάδη, σελ. 425).)

== Pre-Schism Western saints ==
- Martyrs Severinus, Exuperius, and Felician, martyred in Vienne in France under Marcus Aurelius (170) (Note: "At Vienne, the holy martyrs Severinus, Exuperius and Felician. Their bodies, after the lapse of many years, were found through their own revelation, and being taken up with due honors by the bishop, clergy and people of that city, were buried with becoming solemnity.")
- Martyr Maximus, in Rome under Valerian (c. 255) (Note: "At Rome, on the Appian road, the birthday of St. Maximus, priest and martyr, who suffered in the persecution of Valerian, and was buried near St. Xystus.")
- Saint Crispin, Bishop of Écija in Andalusia in Spain, beheaded under Maximian Herculeus (4th century) (Note: "At Ecijo, the blessed bishop Crispinus, who obtained the glory of martyrdom by decapitation.") (Note: "(4th cent.) A Bishop of Ecija (Astiage) in Andalusia (Spain), beheaded as a Christian under the persecuting Emperor Maximian Herculeus at the beginning of the fourth century. St. Crispin is honoured with a special office in the old Spanish or Mozarabic Breviary and Missal.")
- Saint Anastasius II, Pope of Rome (498) (see also: September 8)
- Saint Patroclus of Bourges (577)
- Saint Ermenburgh (Domne Eafe), founder of the convent of Minster-in-Thanet (c. 700) (Note: Also known as Domna Ebba (Lady Ebba, shortened to Domneva. She was a Kentish princess married to the King of Mercia, and the mother of Sts Mildred, Milburgh and Mildgytha. She founded the convent of Minster-in-Thanet in about 670.)
- Saint Egbert, Archbishop of York (766)
- Saint Medana, a holy virgin from Ireland who went to Scotland and lived in Galloway (8th century)
- Saint Tuto (Totto), founder in 764 of the monastery of Ottobeuren in Bavaria in Germany (815)
- Saint James of Sasseau, born in Constantinople, he came to France and was ordained in Clermont, later living as a hermit in Sasseau (c. 865)
- Saint Atto, first Abbot of Tordino near Teramo in Italy (c. 1010)

== Post-Schism Orthodox saints ==
- Venerable Barlaam of Kiev, Abbot of the Kiev Caves (1065)
- Saint Philaret Drozdov, Metropolitan of Moscow (1867)
- Saint Ioannicius, Schema-Archimandrite, of Glinsk Hermitage (1914)
- Saint Porphyrios Bairaktaris of Kafsokalyvia (Kapsokalyvia) and Kallisa (1991) (see also: December 2 - N.S.)

=== New martyrs and confessors ===
- New Hieromartyr John Vishnevsky, Priest (1920)
- New Hieromartyr Porphyrius Gulevich, Bishop of Simferopol and Crimea (1937) (Note: See: (in Russian) Порфирий (Гулевич). Википедии. (Russian Wikipedia).)
- New Hieromartyr Ioasaph (Joasaph) Udalov, Bishop of Chistopol (1937) (Note: See: (in Russian) Иоасаф (Удалов). Википедии. (Russian Wikipedia).)
- New Hieromartyrs Sergius Mikhaev, Michael Dmitriev, Alexander Mishutin, John Malinovsky, Constantine Mikhailovsy, Alexander Serebrov, Ignatius Teslin, John Piramidin, Simeon Krivosheev, John Florovky, Jacob Briliantov, Demetrius Kuklin, Jacob Peredery, Priests (1937)
- New Hieromartyrs Ioasaph (Joasaph) Krymzin (Krimzin), abbot, and Peter Mamontov, hieromonk, both of the Holy Transfiguration Guslitsky Monastery, Moscow (1937)
- New Hieromartyrs Gennady Rebeza, Gerasim Sukhov, Michael Kvanin, Martyr Valentine Kornienko, Peter Antonov, Leonid Salkov, Thimoty Kucherov (1937)
- Deacon-monk Antonius (Korzh) (1937)
- Hieromonk Bartholomeus (Ratnykh) (1937)
- Priest Vladimir Pischulin (1937) (Note: See: (in Russian) Владимир (Пищулин). Википедии. (Russian Wikipedia).)
- Archpriest Demetrius Kiranov (1937)
- Priest John Bliumovich (1937)
- Archpriest Nicholas Mezentsev (1937)
- Priest Timothy Izotov (1937)
- New Hiero-confessor Alexis Kabaliuk, Schema-Archimandrite, of Khust, Carpatho-Russia (1947) (Note: "His canonization took place at the Monastery of St Nicholas in Iza (near Khust, Ukraine) on 21 October 2001, under His Beatitude Metropolitan Vladimir of Kiev and all Ukraine with many bishops and some twenty thousand faithful. His title is Apostle of Carpatho-Russia." He is commemorated on: 8/21 October, and 19 November/2 December.) (Note: See also: (in Russian) Алексий (Кабалюк) (Russian Wikipedia).) (see also: December 2 - N.S.)

== Other commemorations ==
- Uncovering of the relics (1625) of Monk-martyr Adrian of Poshekhon, Abbot of Poshekhonye (1550)
- "Consolation in Afflictions and Sorrows" Icon of the Mother of God (1863)
- Repose of Elder Cleopa Ilie of Sihastria, Romania (1998) (see also: December 2 - N.S.)

== Icon gallery ==
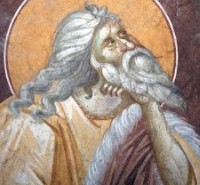
Prophet Obadiah (Abdias).

Prophet Obadiah.
(Menologion of Basil II, 10th century).

Martyr Azes of Isauria, and with him 150 soldiers.
(Menologion of Basil II, 10th century).

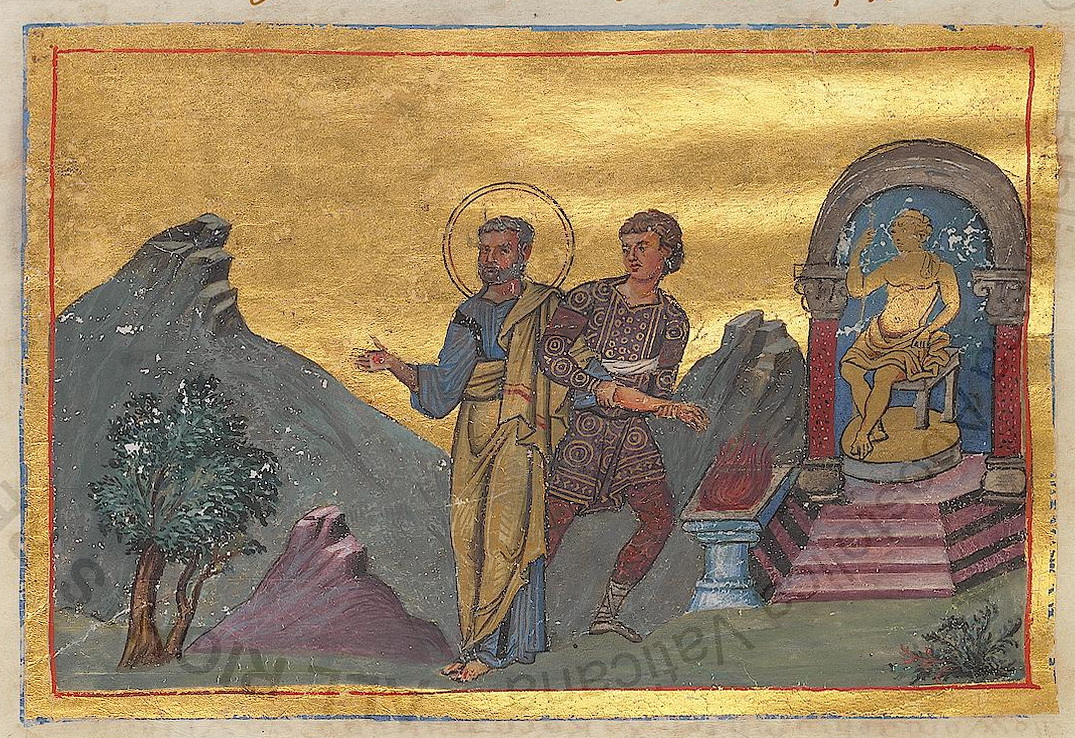
Martyr Barlaam of Caesarea in Cappadocia.
(Menologion of Basil II, 10th century).

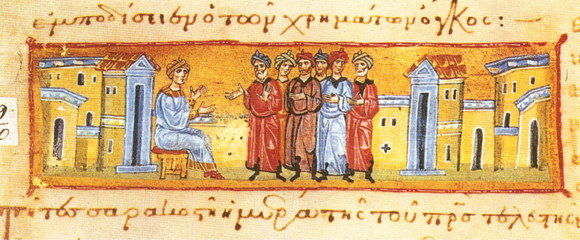
Venerable loasaph.

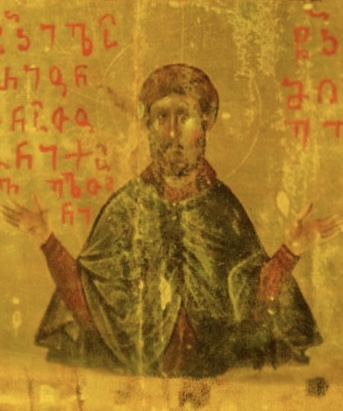
Venerable Hilarion the Iberian of Georgia, monk, Wonderworker of Thessaloniki.

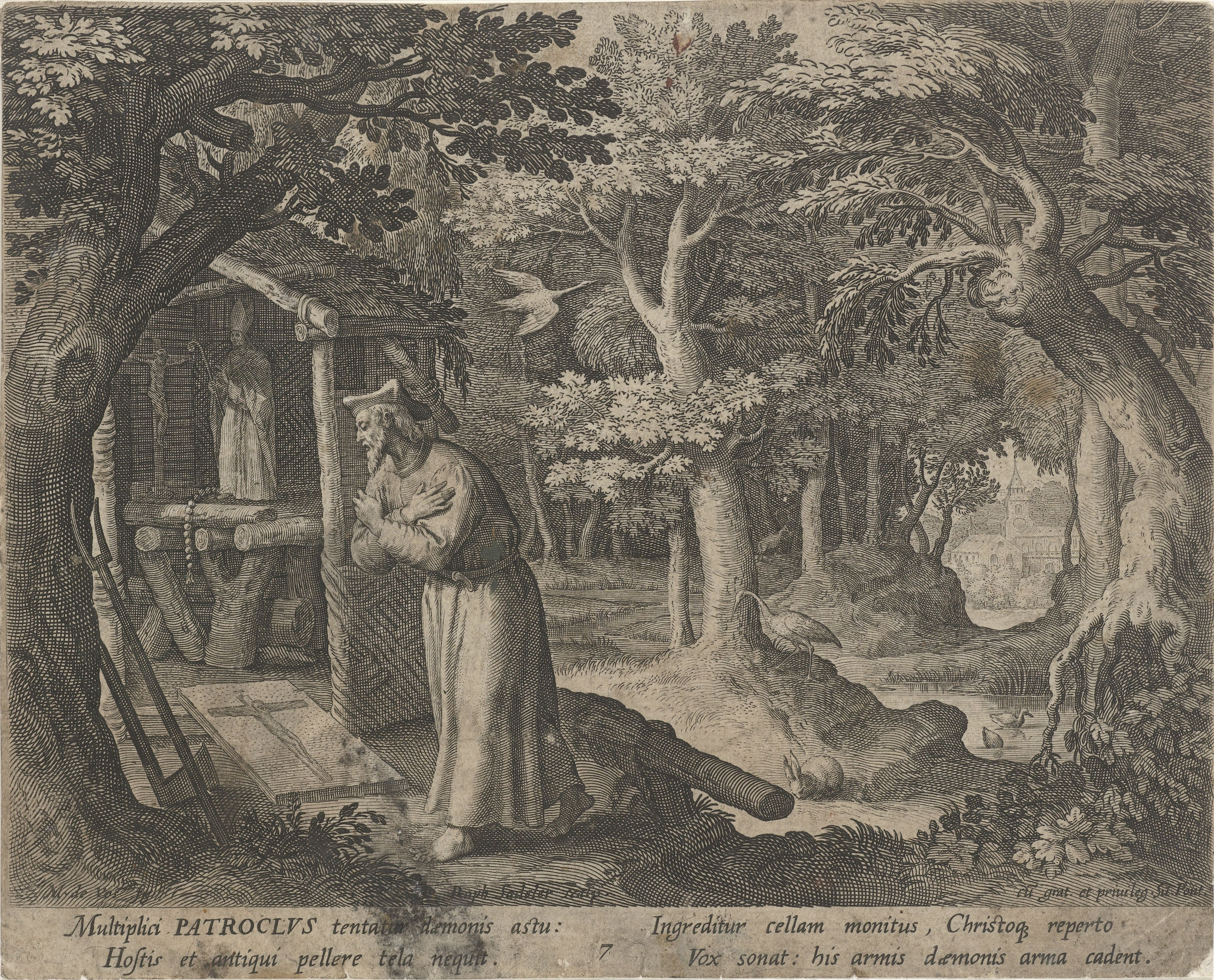
St. Patroclus of Bourges.

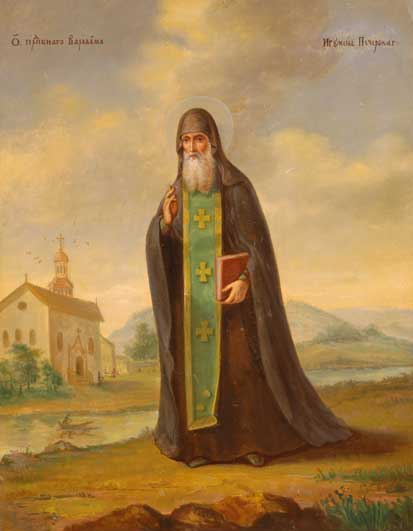
Venerable Barlaam of Kiev, Abbot of the Kiev Caves.

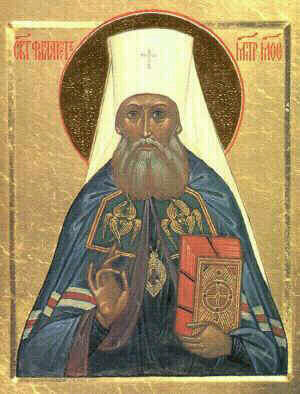
Saint Philaret Drozdov, Metropolitan of Moscow.

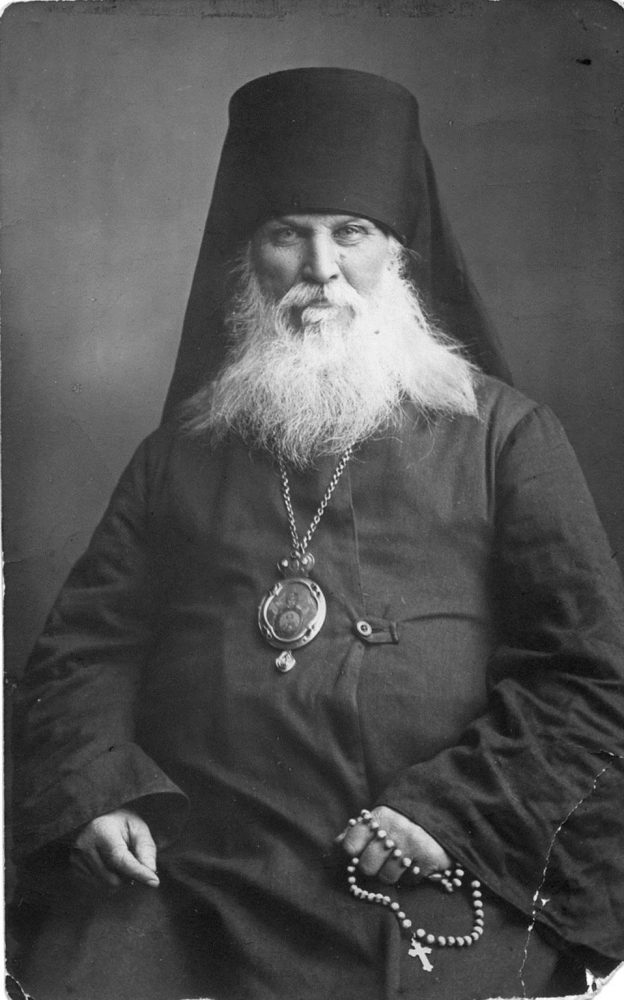
New Hieromartyr Porphirius (Gulevich), Bishop of Simferopol and Crimea.

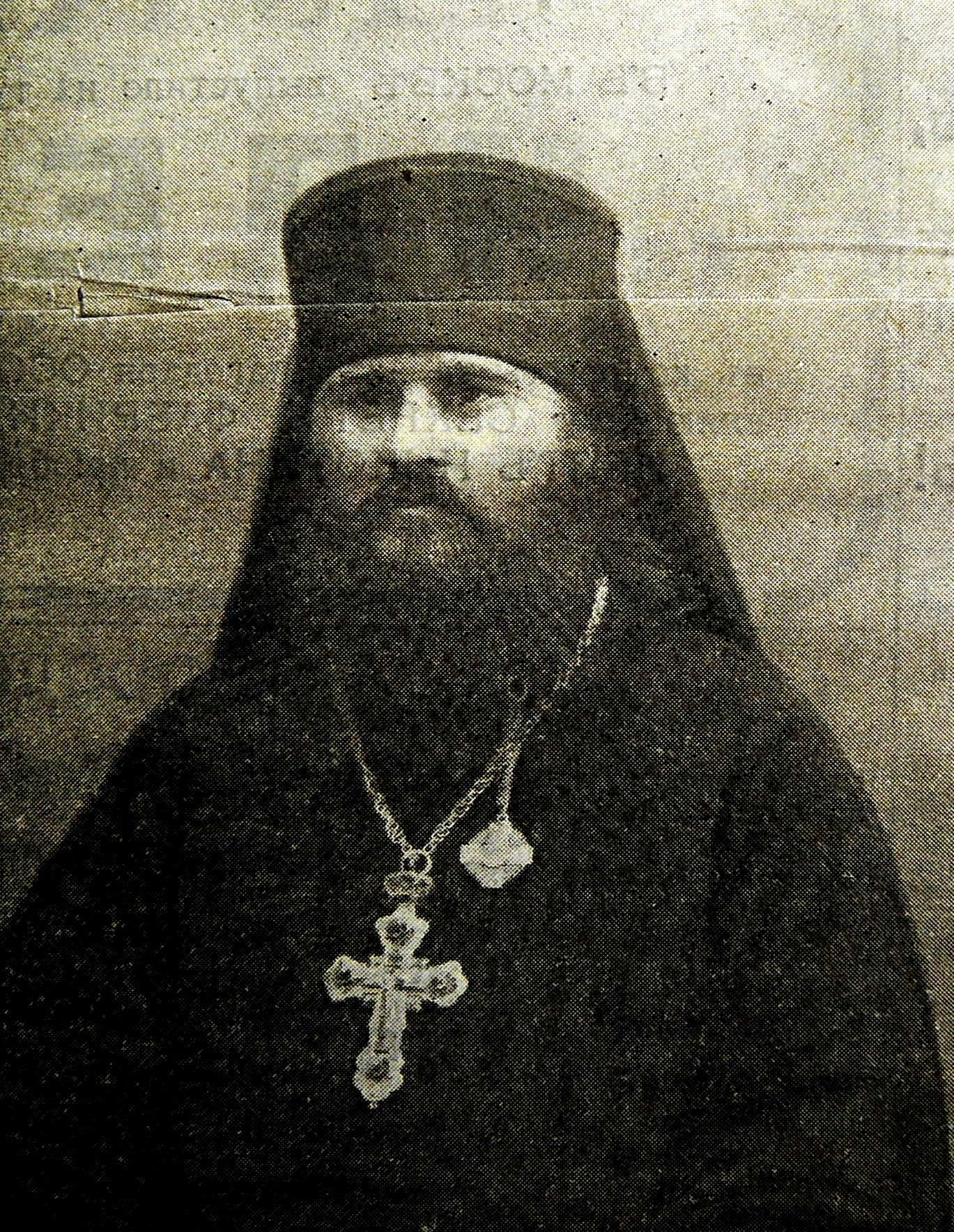
New Hieromartyr Ioasaph (Udalov), Bishop of Chistopol.

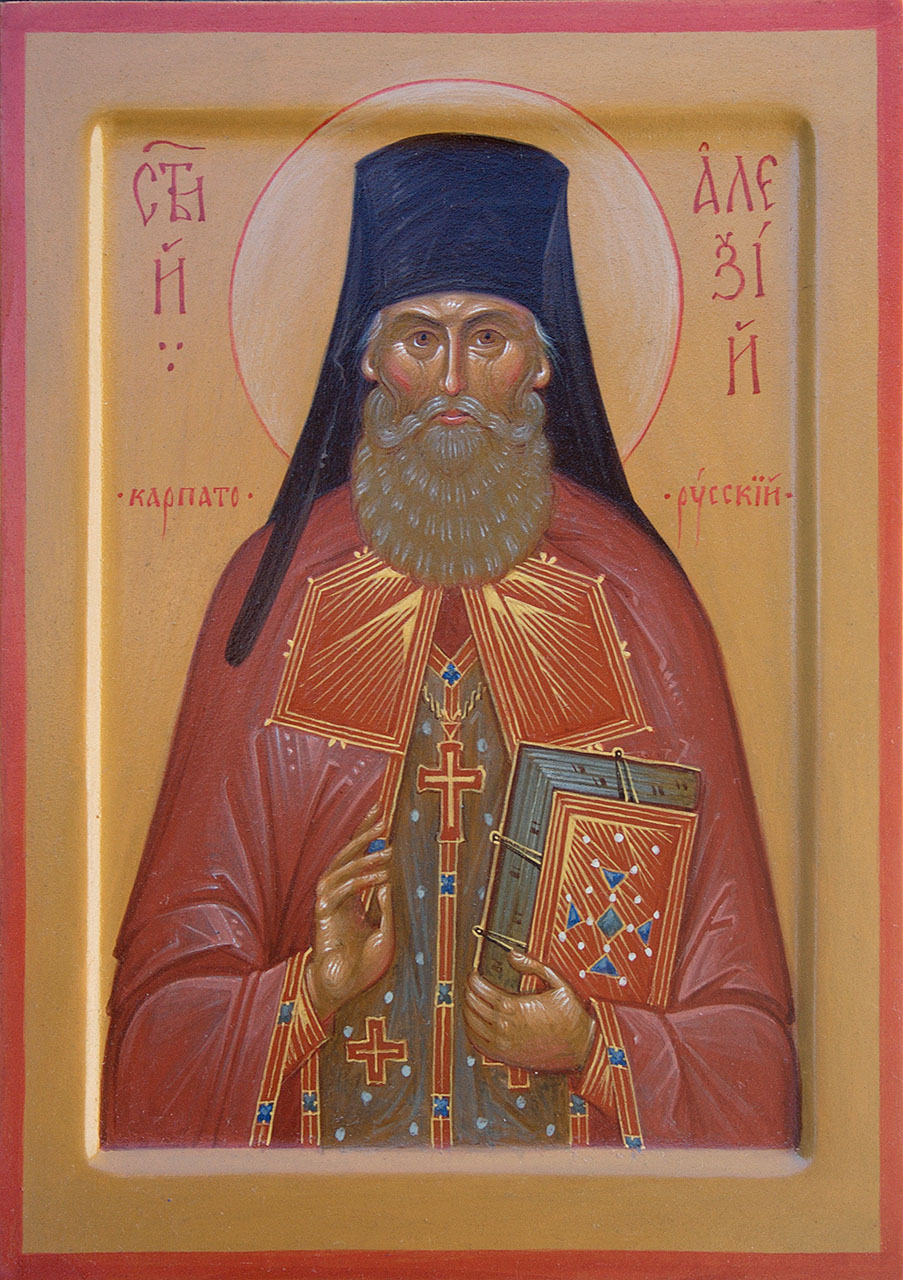
New Hiero-confessor Alexis (Kabaliuk), Apostle of Carpatho-Russia.

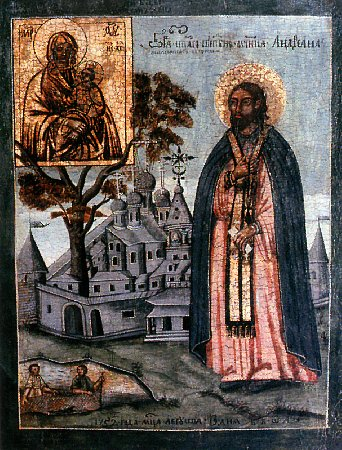
Monk-martyr Adrian of Poshekhon, Abbot of Poshekhonye.

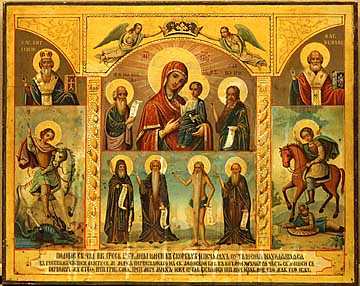
The Joy of All who Sorrow" (1863) Icon of the Mother of God.

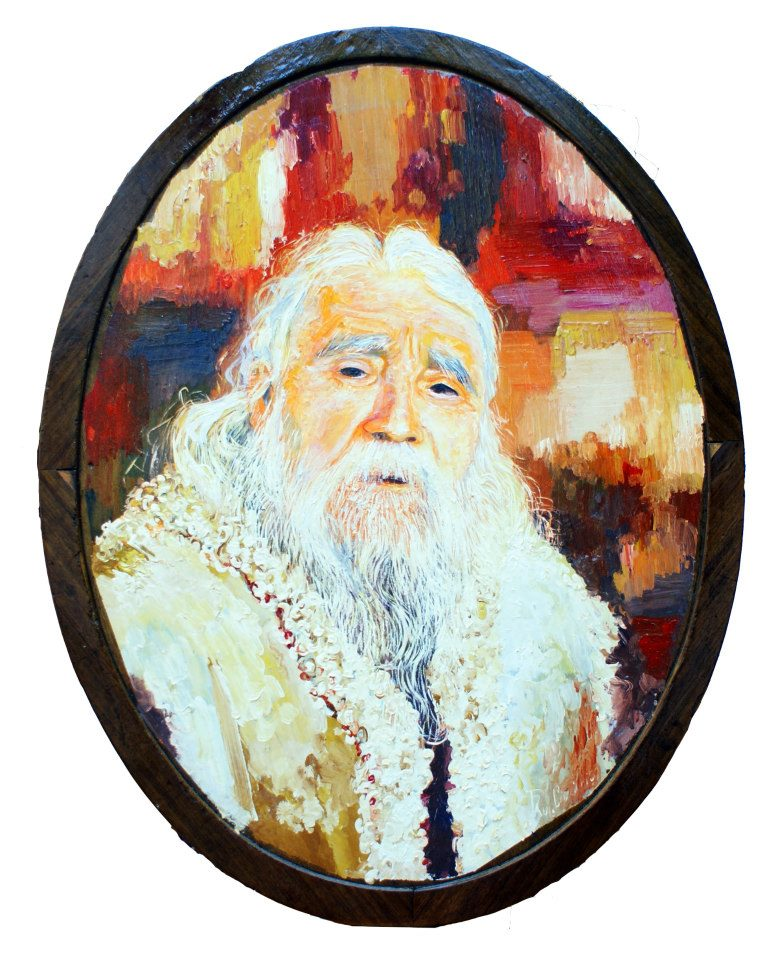
Elder Cleopa (Ilie) of Sihastria.

== Sources ==
- November 19 / December 2. Orthodox Calendar (PRAVOSLAVIE.RU).
- December 2 / November 19. Holy Trinity Russian Orthodox Church (A parish of the Patriarchate of Moscow).
- November 19. OCA - The Lives of the Saints.
- The Autonomous Orthodox Metropolia of Western Europe and the Americas (ROCOR). St. Hilarion Calendar of Saints for the year of our Lord 2004. St. Hilarion Press (Austin, TX). pp. 86–87.
- The Nineteenth Day of the Month of November. Orthodoxy in China.
- November 19. Latin Saints of the Orthodox Patriarchate of Rome.
- The Roman Martyrology. Transl. by the Archbishop of Baltimore. Last Edition, According to the Copy Printed at Rome in 1914. Revised Edition, with the Imprimatur of His Eminence Cardinal Gibbons. Baltimore: John Murphy Company, 1916. pp. 357–358.
- Rev. Richard Stanton. A Menology of England and Wales, or, Brief Memorials of the Ancient British and English Saints Arranged According to the Calendar, Together with the Martyrs of the 16th and 17th Centuries. London: Burns & Oates, 1892. pp. 557–559.

Greek Sources

- Great Synaxaristes: (in Greek) 19 ΝΟΕΜΒΡΙΟΥ. ΜΕΓΑΣ ΣΥΝΑΞΑΡΙΣΤΗΣ.
- (in Greek) Συναξαριστής. 19 Νοεμβρίου. ECCLESIA.GR. (H ΕΚΚΛΗΣΙΑ ΤΗΣ ΕΛΛΑΔΟΣ).
- (in Greek) November 19. Ορθόδοξος Συναξαριστής.

Russian Sources

- (in Russian) 2 декабря (19 ноября). Православная Энциклопедия под редакцией Патриарха Московского и всея Руси Кирилла (электронная версия). (Orthodox Encyclopedia - Pravenc.ru).
- (in Russian) 19 ноября по старому стилю / 2 декабря по новому . Русская Православная Церковь - Православный церковный календарь на 2018 год.
