= December 2 (Eastern Orthodox liturgics) =

Day in the Eastern Orthodox liturgical calendar

Eastern Orthodox liturgical calendar
December 1	December 2	December 3
December 2 O.S. ≍ December 15 N.S. December 2 N.S ≍ November 19 O.S.

An Eastern Orthodox cross

December 2 in Eastern Orthodox liturgical calendars is a feast day and a day of commemoration of saints and martyrs. Although some Orthodox churches use the Revised Julian Calendar and others use the traditional Julian calendar, the fixed commemorations for their respective December 2 are broadly the same, no matter which calendar is used. (Note: Despite the dates being the same, the days to which they refer typically differ by 13 days. The notation Old Style or O.S. is sometimes used to indicate a date in the traditional Julian Calendar (the "Old Calendar"). The notation New Style or N.S. indicates a date in the Revised Julian calendar (the "New Calendar").)

== Saints ==
- Prophet Habakkuk (Abbacum) (7th century BC)
- Martyr Myrope of Chios, under Decius (251) (Note: In the Synaxarion of Delehaye her memory is celebrated on November 23.)
- Martyr Abibus (Habib, Habibus) the New of Edessa, Deacon, burned at the stake (c. 307-323) (Note: According to the Synaxaristes, the Christians took his relics and with buried them with honours together with those of the Holy Martyrs Guria and Samona (November 15).)
- Saints John, Heraclemon, Andrew and Theophilus, of Oxyrhynchus, hermits of Egypt (4th century) (see also: June 12)
- Saint Moses the Confessor (Moses the Economos) (Note: His name is unknown in the Synaxarion of St. Nicodemus. However he is commemorated on December 2nd in the Synaxarion of Delehaye. Also, in Parisian Codex 1578, he is referred to on December 3rd as Moses the Economos, which is likely referring to the same saint.)
- Venerable Jesse (Ise, Isidore), Bishop of Tsilkani in Georgia, of the Thirteen Assyrian Fathers (6th century)
- Saint Solomon, Archbishop of Ephesus (see also: December 1)

== Pre-Schism Western saints ==
- Saint Evasius, First Bishop of Brescia in Italy
- Saint Lupus (Luperius), Bishop of Verona in Italy, Confessor
- Martyrs Eusebius, a priest; Marcellus, a deacon; Hippolytus, Maximus, Adria, Paulina, Neon, Mary, Martana, and Aurelia - under Valerian (c. 254-259) (Note: Neon and Mary were beheaded; Adria and Hippolytus were scourged to death; Paulina died in a torture-chamber; Maximus was thrown into the Tiber.) (Note: "In the same place, the holy martyrs Eusebius, priest, Marcellus, deacon, Hippolytus, Maximus, Adria, Paulina, Neon, Mary, Martana, and Aurelia, who consummated their martyrdom in the persecution of Valerian, under the judge Secundian.")
- Martyr Pontian, with four others, at Rome, under Valerian (c. 259)
- Saint Bibiana (Vibiana, Vivian, Viviana), a holy virgin martyred in Rome (c. 361-363) (Note: "AT Rome, the martyrdom of the saintly virgin Bibiana, under the sacrilegious emperor Julian. For the sake of our Lord, she was scourged with leaded whips until she expired.")
- Saint Chromatius, Bishop of Aquileia near Venice, friend of Saint John Chrysostom, Confessor (406) (Note: We still have part of his commentary on St. Matthew.)
- Martyrs Severus, Securus, Januarius and Victorinus, martyrs in North Africa who suffered under the Vandals (c. 450) (Note: "In Africa, the birthday of the holy martyrs Severus, Securus, Januarius, and Victorinus, who were there crowned with martyrdom.")
- Saint Silverius, Pope of Rome (537) (Note: Born in Frosinone in Campania in Italy, he was the son of Pope Hormisdas. He was a subdeacon when elected Bishop of Rome. He was hated by the Empress Theodora for objecting to the Monophysite Bishop Anthimus. Condemned for high treason, he was finally exiled to an island off Naples where he was left to die and perhaps martyred.)
- Saint Trumwine of Abercorn (Trumwin of Whitby), the only ever Bishop of the Northumbrian see of the Picts (late 7th century) (see also: February 10)

== Post-Schism Orthodox saints ==
- Saint Cyril Phileotes (of Philea) (in the vicinity of Derkos in Thrace) (1110)
- Venerable Abbacum (Abbakum) the Ascetic of Cyprus, Wonderworker (late 12th century) (Note: His place of birth and his parents are unknown. However what is known about him is that he was one of the 300 Allemagne Saints, who came to Cyprus from Palestine, and lived as ascetics in various parts of the island. These people were Greek migrant workers who worked in Germany or «Alamania» (Allemagne). They had participated in the Second Crusade (1147 - 1149), and after its dissolution, after having gone and worshiped in Jerusalem, they decided to live the monastic life in the Jordan desert. However since the Latins there disturbed them, they relocated to Cyrus and dispersed over the island. After having visited several places, Osios (Venerable) Abbakum settled in the area of Soloi in Cyprus. There, he lived in a cave as a hermit and began his aceticism. (Two others of these 300 saints are: Constantine of Cyprus (Constantine of Allemagne) (July 1); and Venerable Cassian the Martyr (December 4)).)
- Saint Athanasius "the Resurrected," recluse of the Kiev Caves, whose relics are in the Near Caves (1176)
- Saint Athanasius, recluse of the Kiev Caves, whose relics are in the Far Caves (1264) (Note: The "Sayings and Lives of the Saints Who Repose in the Cave of St. Theodosius," says that St. Athanasius had no need of candles in the cave, since a heavenly light shone for him. He grants healing to all who approach him with faith. The memory of St. Athanasius is celebrated also on August 28 and on the second Sunday of Great Lent.)
- Saint Stephen-Urosh V, King of Serbia (1371), and his mother Saint Helena of Bulgaria, Empress of Serbia (1376)
- Venerable Joannicius of Devič, Serbia (1430)
- Venerable Elder Porphyrios Bairaktaris, Wonderworker of Kafsokalyvia (Kavsokaliva) and Kallisa, an Athonite hieromonk known for his gifts of spiritual discernment (1991) (Note: In 2017 the holy synod of the Romanian Orthodox Church formally approved the inclusion of St. Porphyrios the Kavoskalyvite into the Church’s calendar as well, including his troparion, kontakion, Synaxarion, and icon.)
- Venerable Cleopa (Ilie) of Sihăstria, Archimandrite, abbot of Sihăstria Monastery (1998)

=== New martyrs and confessors ===
- New Hieromartyr John, Priest (1919)
- New Hieromartyr Matthew Alexandrov, Priest of Simferopol-Crimea (1921)
- New Hieromartyr Demetrius Blagoveshtensky, priest, and Venarable Vera Grafovoy, Confessor (1932)
- New Hieromartyrs (1937):
  - Constantine Nekrasov and Nicholas Vinogradsky, (Note: See: (in Russian) Виноградский, Николай Васильевич. Википедии. (Russian Wikipedia).) Protopresbyters of Moscow;
  - Sergius Felitsin, Vladimir Proferansov, (Note: See: (in Russian) Проферансов, Владимир Александрович. Википедии. (Russian Wikipedia).) John Derzhavin, Theodore Alexinsky, Nicholas Zabolotsky, John Dniprovsky, Nicholas Safonov, Priests;
  - Hieromartyr Danax (Danact) Kalashnikov, Hieromonk of Arkhangelskoye, Moscow; (Note: See: (in Russian) Данакт (Калашников). Википедии. (Russian Wikipedia).)
  - Hieromartyr Cosmas Magda, Hieromonk of Milyatino, Moscow;
  - Hieromartyrs (Nuns): Theuromia, Tamara Provorkinoy, Antonina Stepanova, and Mary Dmitrievska;
  - Virgin-martyrs: Mary Zhuravlevoy and Matrona Konyukhova.
- Virgin-martyr Mary Zeitlin (1938)
- Martyr Boris Uspensky (1942)
- Venerable New Hiero-Confessor Alexei Kabalyuk of Carpathia, Schema-Archimandrite, of Khust, Apostle of Carpatho-Russia (1947) (Note: "His canonization took place at the Monastery of St. Nicholas in Iza (near Khust, Ukraine) on 21 October 2001, under His Beatitude Metropolitan Vladimir of Kiev and all the Ukraine with many bishops and some twenty thousand faithful. His title is 'Apostle of Carpatho-Russia'." He is commemorated on: 8/21 October, and 19 November/2 December.) (Note: See also: (in Russian) Алексий (Кабалюк) (Russian Wikipedia).) (see also: November 19 - (O.S.))
- Venerable New Hiero-Confessor Paisie (Olaru) of Sihăstria, Hieroschemamonk of Sihăstria Monastery (1990) (Note: See: (in Romanian) Paisie Olaru. Wikipedia. (Romanian Wikipedia).)

== Other commemorations ==
- Synaxis of the Gerontissa Icon of the Mother of God (1948) (see also: April 4)
- Repose of Elder Luke "the Guestmaster" of Valaam (Schema-abbot Luke), (1965) (Note: Hospitality in Valaam was upheld as a great virtue. Usually very sensitive and strong personalities were chosen for this obedience. At the turn of the century thousands of pilgrims visited Valaam and all had to be met with love and a perception of what each individual pilgrim came for. The monastery had room for a thousand pilgrims. One such host was Fr. Luke. He labored all his life as guestmaster, full of compassion and warmth. Once he said, "What wonder! The Lord entrusted the keys to the Heavenly Kingdom not to the pure Apostle John the Theologian, but to Peter who denied Him thrice, for he would know the fallen state from experience and would be kinder to sinners." He was a firm defender of the Church Calendar. He left for Valamo in Finland during World War II. Luke was promised that he would be able to return to Old Valaam but he never saw Valaam again and died in Pskov-Caves Monastery in 1965 as a righteous elder confessor. The monk in whose arms Fr. Luke reposed testified that Fr. Luke had achieved the blessed state and the Kingdom of Christ as a result of his conscientious reading of the works of St. Isaac the Syrian.)

== Icon gallery ==
The prophet Habakkuk.
(Menologion of Basil II, 10th century).

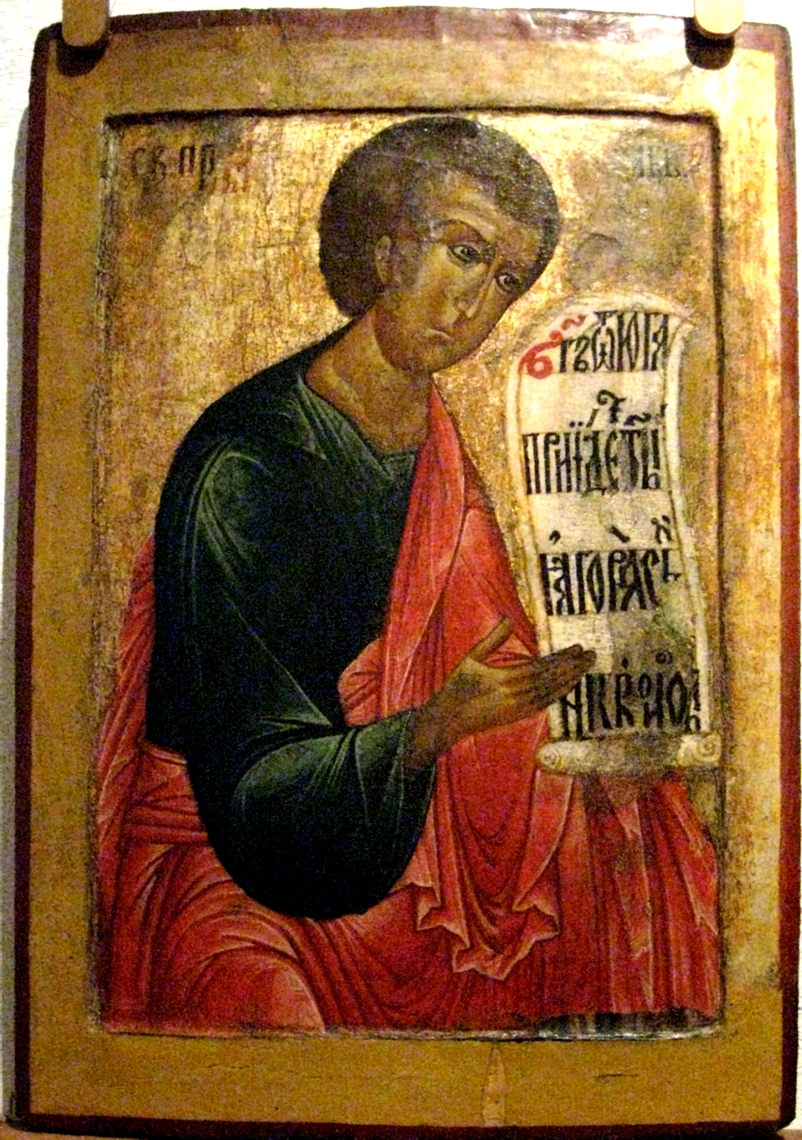
The prophet Habakkuk. (Kirillo-Belozersky Monastery, 17th century).

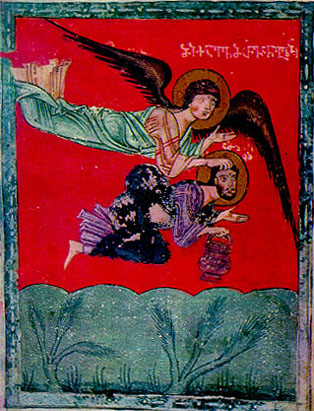
Archangel Michael takes Habakkuk to Daniel in the lion's Den (c. 1300).

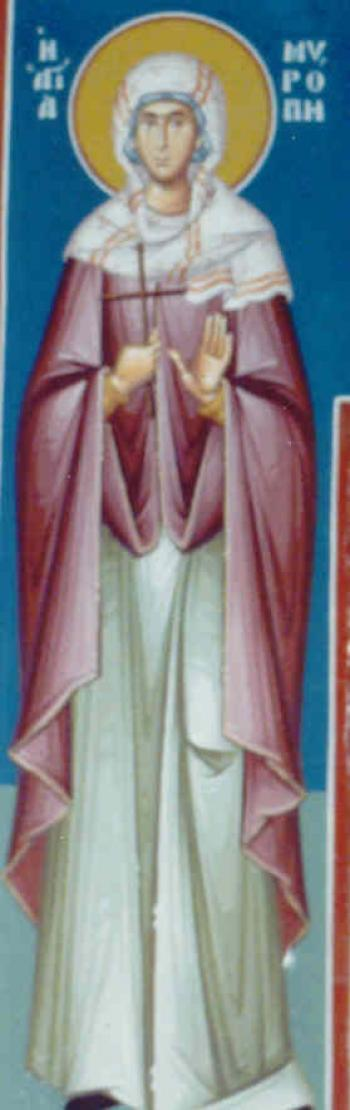
Martyr Myrope of Chios.

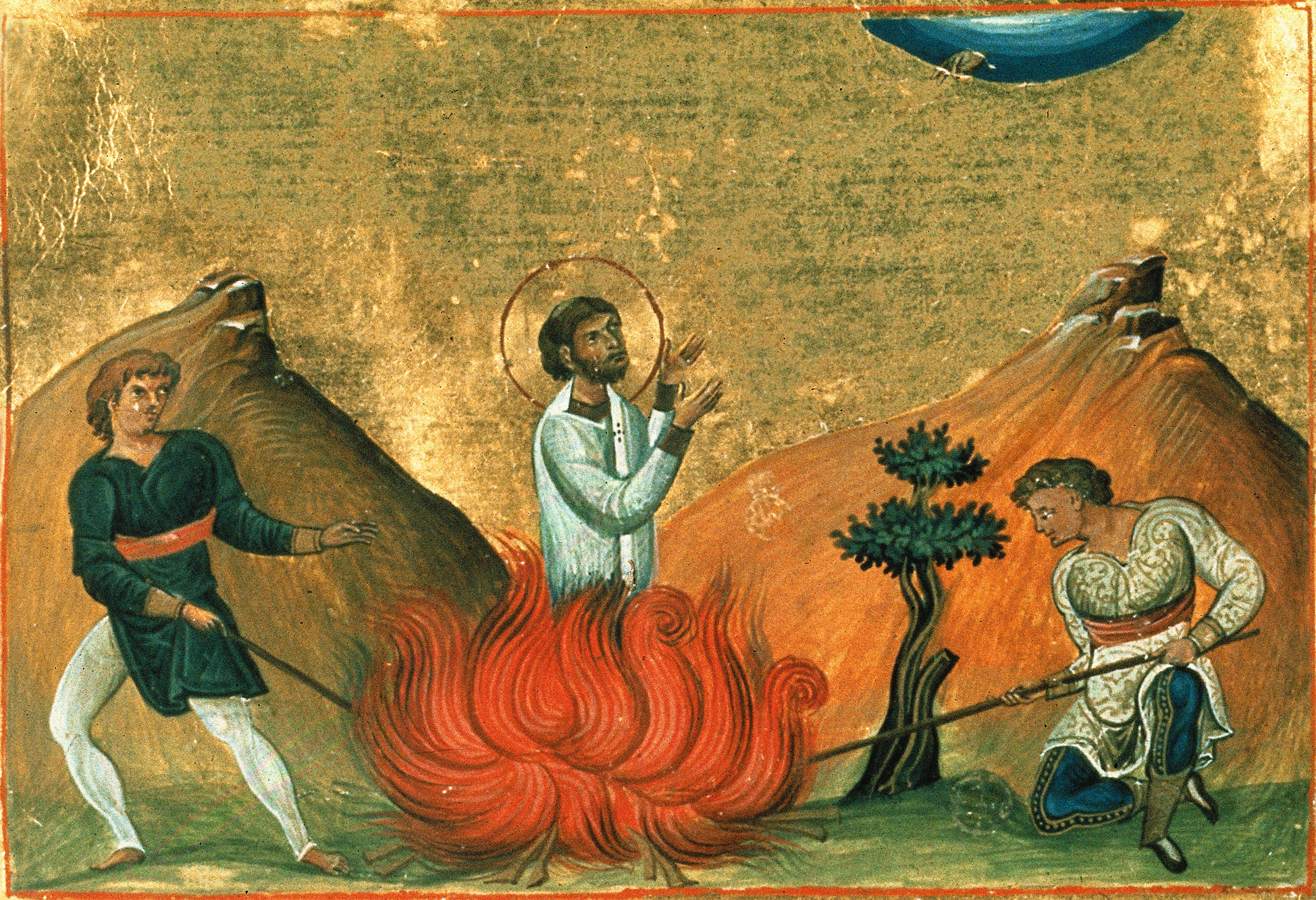
Martyr Abibus (Habib, Habibus) the New of Edessa, Deacon, burned at the stake.
(Menologion of Basil II, 10th century).

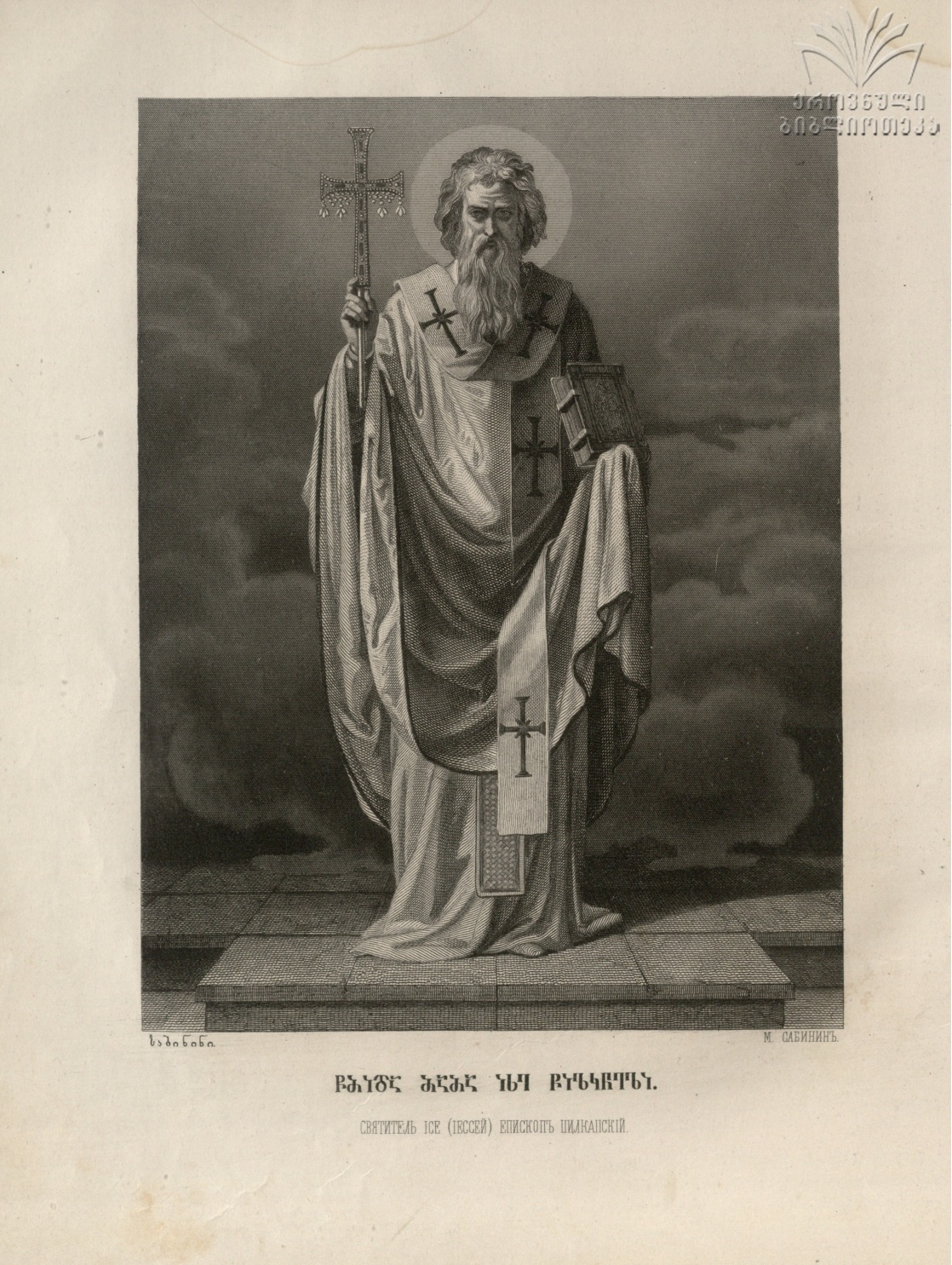
St. Jesse (Ise, Isidore), Bishop of Tsilkani in Georgia.

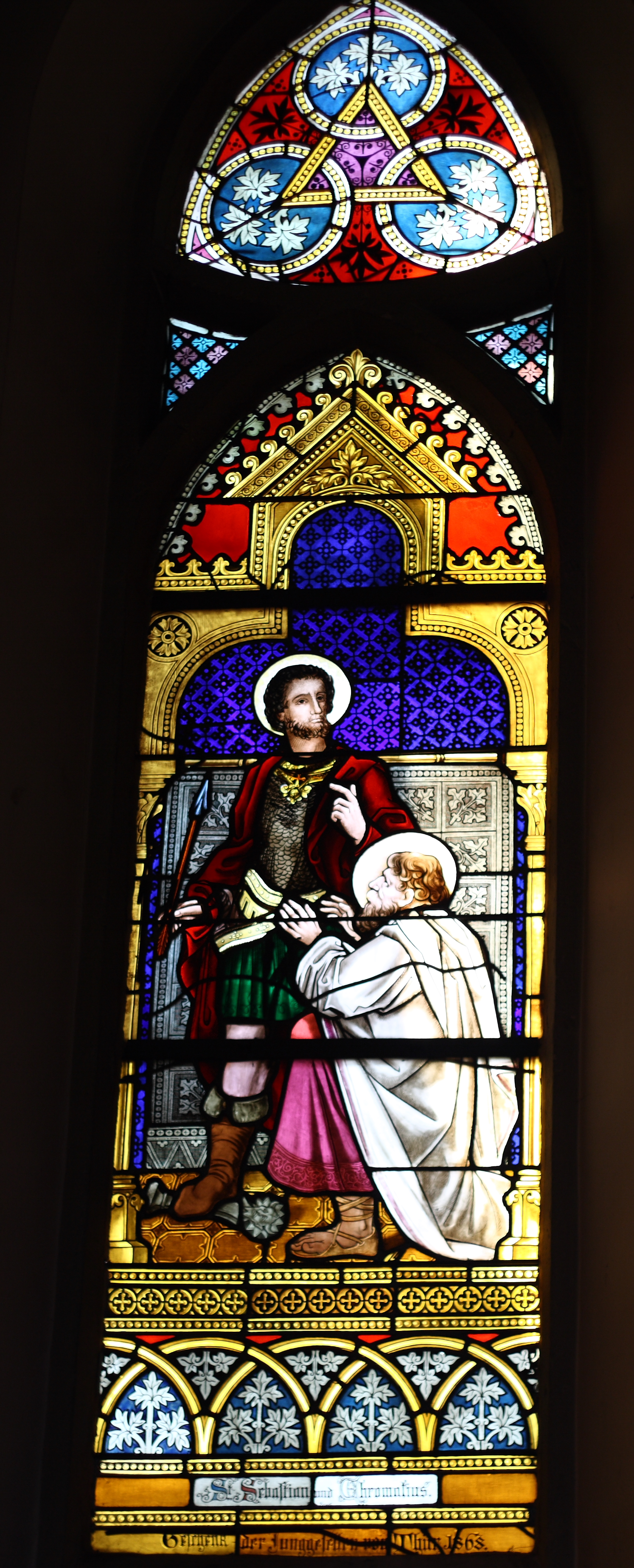
Stained glass window of Sts. Sebastianus and Chromatius.

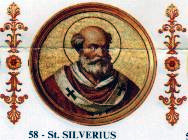
Pope Silverius.

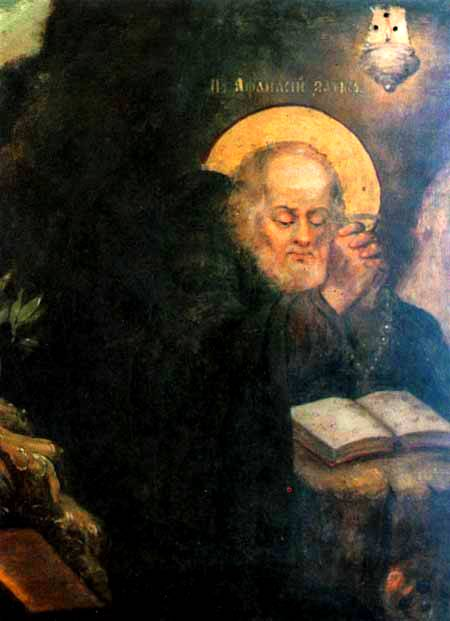
St. Athanasius "the Resurrected," recluse of the Kiev Near Caves.

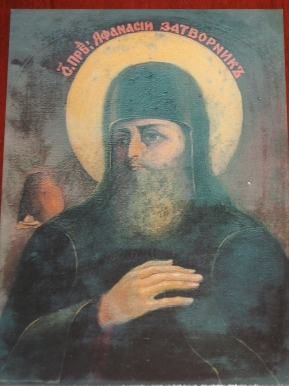
St. Athanasius, recluse of the Kiev Far Caves.

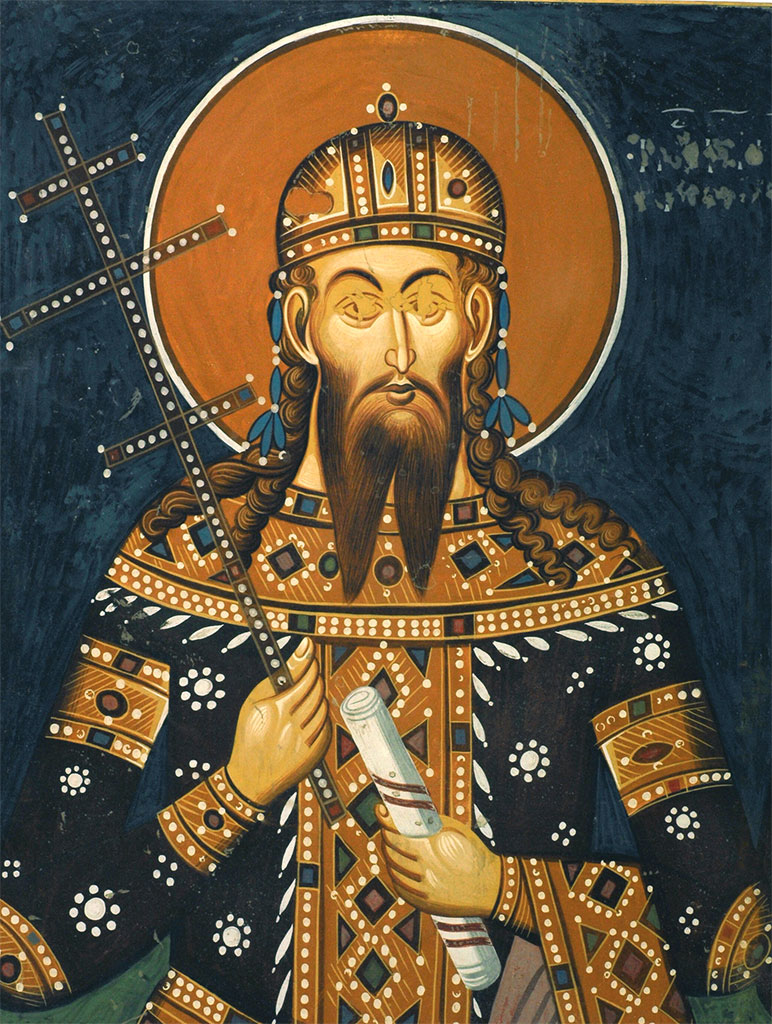
Saint Stephen-Uroš V, King of Serbia

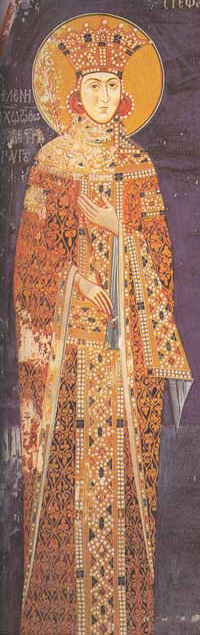
St. Helena of Bulgaria.

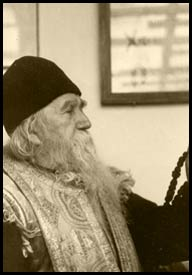
Venerable Cleopa (Ilie) of Sihăstria.

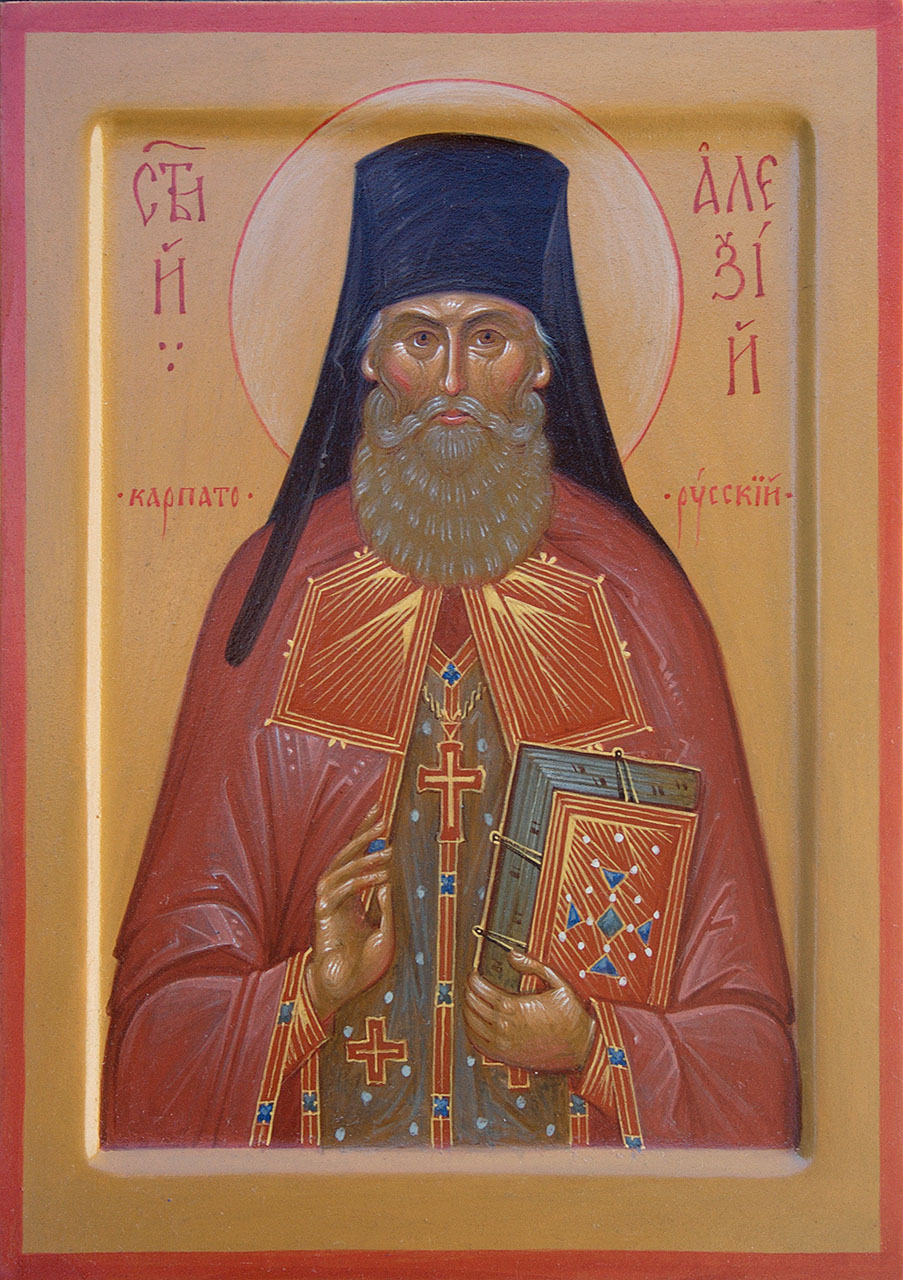
New Hiero-confessor Alexis (Kabaliuk), Apostle of Carpatho-Russia.

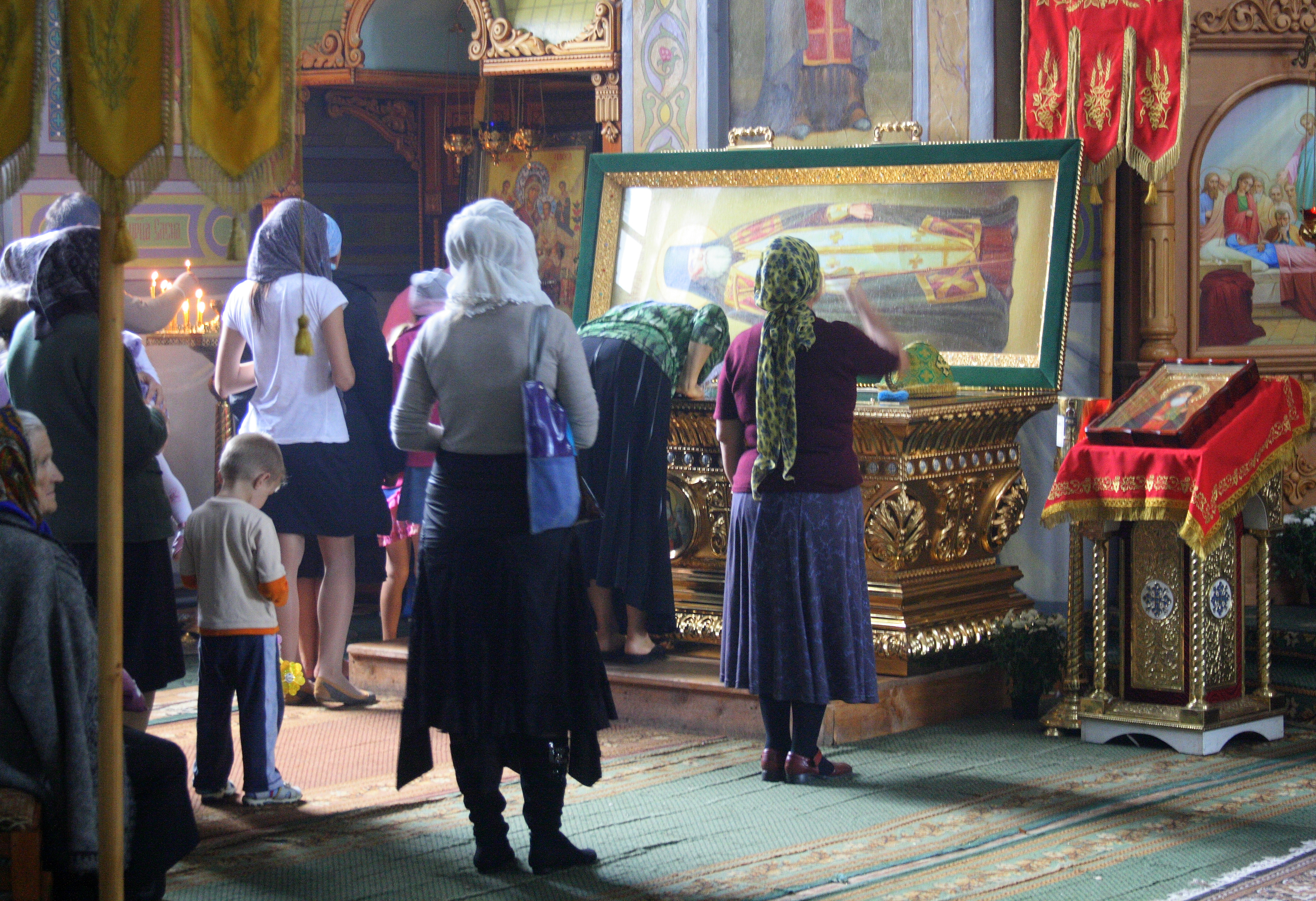
Relics of St. Alexei (Kabaliuk) of Carpathia (Monastery of St. Nicholas in Iza, near Khust, Ukraine).

New Hieromartyr Vladimir Proferansov, Priest.

New Hieromartyr Danax (Danact) Kalashnikov, Hieromonk of Arkhangelskoye, Moscow.

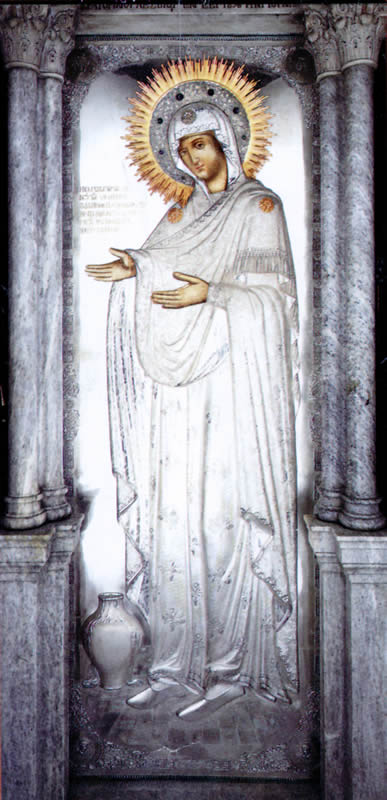
Gerontissa Icon of the Mother of God.

== Sources ==
- December 2/15. Orthodox Calendar (PRAVOSLAVIE.RU).
- December 15 / December 2. HOLY TRINITY RUSSIAN ORTHODOX CHURCH (A parish of the Patriarchate of Moscow).
- December 2. OCA - The Lives of the Saints.
- December 2. Latin Saints of the Orthodox Patriarchate of Rome.
- The Roman Martyrology. Transl. by the Archbishop of Baltimore. Last Edition, According to the Copy Printed at Rome in 1914. Revised Edition, with the Imprimatur of His Eminence Cardinal Gibbons. Baltimore: John Murphy Company, 1916. pp. 371–372.
- Rev. Richard Stanton. A Menology of England and Wales, or, Brief Memorials of the Ancient British and English Saints Arranged According to the Calendar, Together with the Martyrs of the 16th and 17th Centuries. London: Burns & Oates, 1892. p. 579.

Greek Sources

- Great Synaxaristes: (in Greek) 2 ΔΕΚΕΜΒΡΙΟΥ. ΜΕΓΑΣ ΣΥΝΑΞΑΡΙΣΤΗΣ.
- (in Greek) Συναξαριστής. 2 Δεκεμβρίου. ECCLESIA.GR. (H ΕΚΚΛΗΣΙΑ ΤΗΣ ΕΛΛΑΔΟΣ).

Russian Sources

- (in Russian) 15 декабря (2 декабря). Православная Энциклопедия под редакцией Патриарха Московского и всея Руси Кирилла (электронная версия). (Orthodox Encyclopedia - Pravenc.ru).
- (in Russian) 2 декабря (ст.ст.) 15 декабря 2014 (нов. ст.). Русская Православная Церковь Отдел внешних церковных связей. (DECR).
