= Ivan Atanassov Petrov =

Bulgarian neurologist

- ИВАН АТАНАСОВ ПЕТРОВ
- Born: 2 December 1947 (age 78); Sofia, Bulgaria
- Occupations: Head of the Clinic of Neurology at the Medical Institute of the Ministry of Internal Affairs in Sofia, Bulgaria
- Title: Professor

Ivan Atanassov Petrov, (Bulgarian: Иван Атанасов Петров; born 1947) is a Bulgarian neurologist and the head of the Clinic of Neurology at the Medical Institute of the Ministry of Internal Affairs in Sofia, Bulgaria. He holds an MD and a PhD.

His research on biopsy investigation of muscle and peripheral nerves in neuromuscular diseases has made significant contributions to neurological science. He is the author of more than 200 scientific publications in the areas of neuropathology, postherpetic neuralgia and multiple sclerosis.

He is married to Bulgarian nutritionist Stefka Petrova and has one son.
