= Cleopa Ilie =

Romanian Orthodox saint

Saint Cleopa of Sihăstria
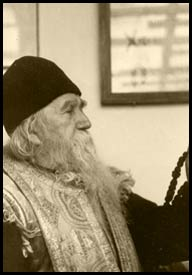

Archimandrite Hegumen of Sihăstria
- Born: 10 April 1912; Sulița, Botoșani, Kingdom of Romania
- Residence: Sihăstria Monastery
- Died: 12 February 1998 (aged 85); Vânători-Neamț, Neamț, Romania
- Venerated in: Eastern Orthodox Church
- Canonized: 12 July 2024 by Romanian Orthodox Church
- Feast: 2 December

Saint Cleopa of Sihăstria (secular name Constantin Ilie, Romanian pronunciation: [kleˈopa iˈli.e]; 10 April 1912 – 2 December 1998) was an abbot of the Sihăstria Monastery. He was a well-known spiritual representative of the Romanian Orthodox Church.

Archimandrite Cleopa was glorified as a saint by the Eastern Orthodox Church on 12 July 2024. His feast day is 2 December, alongside saints Paisie (Olaru) of Sihăstria and Porphyrios of Kafsokalyvia.

== Biography ==
Constantin Ilie was born in Sulița, Botoșani County to a family of peasants. He was the fifth of ten children born to Alexandru and Ana Ilie. He attended the primary school in his village. Afterwards, he was an apprentice for three years to the monk Paisie Olaru, who lived in seclusion at the Cozancea Hermitage.

Ilie joined the community at Sihăstria Hermitage in December 1929. His brothers Vasile and George joined at the same time. In 1935, he joined the army in the town of Botoșani, but returned a year later to the hermitage, where he was tonsured a monk on 2 August 1937, taking the name "Cleopa" (i.e., "guide") at his tonsuring. In June 1942, he was appointed to hegumen deputy because of abbot Ioanichie Moroi's poor health.

On 27 December 1944, he was ordained a hierodeacon (deacon-monk) and on 23 January 1945, a hieromonk (priest-monk) by the archbishop Galaction Cordun, abbot of the Neamț Monastery at the time. Afterwards, he was officially appointed hegumen of the Sihăstria Hermitage.

In 1947, the hermitage became a monastery, and vice-archimandrite Cleopa Ilie became archimandrite upon the approval of Patriarch Nicodim. In May 1948, the Communist secret police arrested him and held him for five days. After his release, he disappeared into the woods surrounding the monastery, staying there for six months. On 30 August 1949, he was appointed abbot of the Slatina Monastery in Suceava County, where he joined 30 other monks from the Sihăstria Monastery community as a result of Patriarch Justinian's decision.

There he founded a community of monks with over 80 people. Between 1952 and 1954, he was being pursued again by the Securitate, and, together with hieromonk Arsenie Papacioc, escaped to the Stânișoara Mountains. He was brought back to the monastery after two years upon Patriarch Justinian's order.

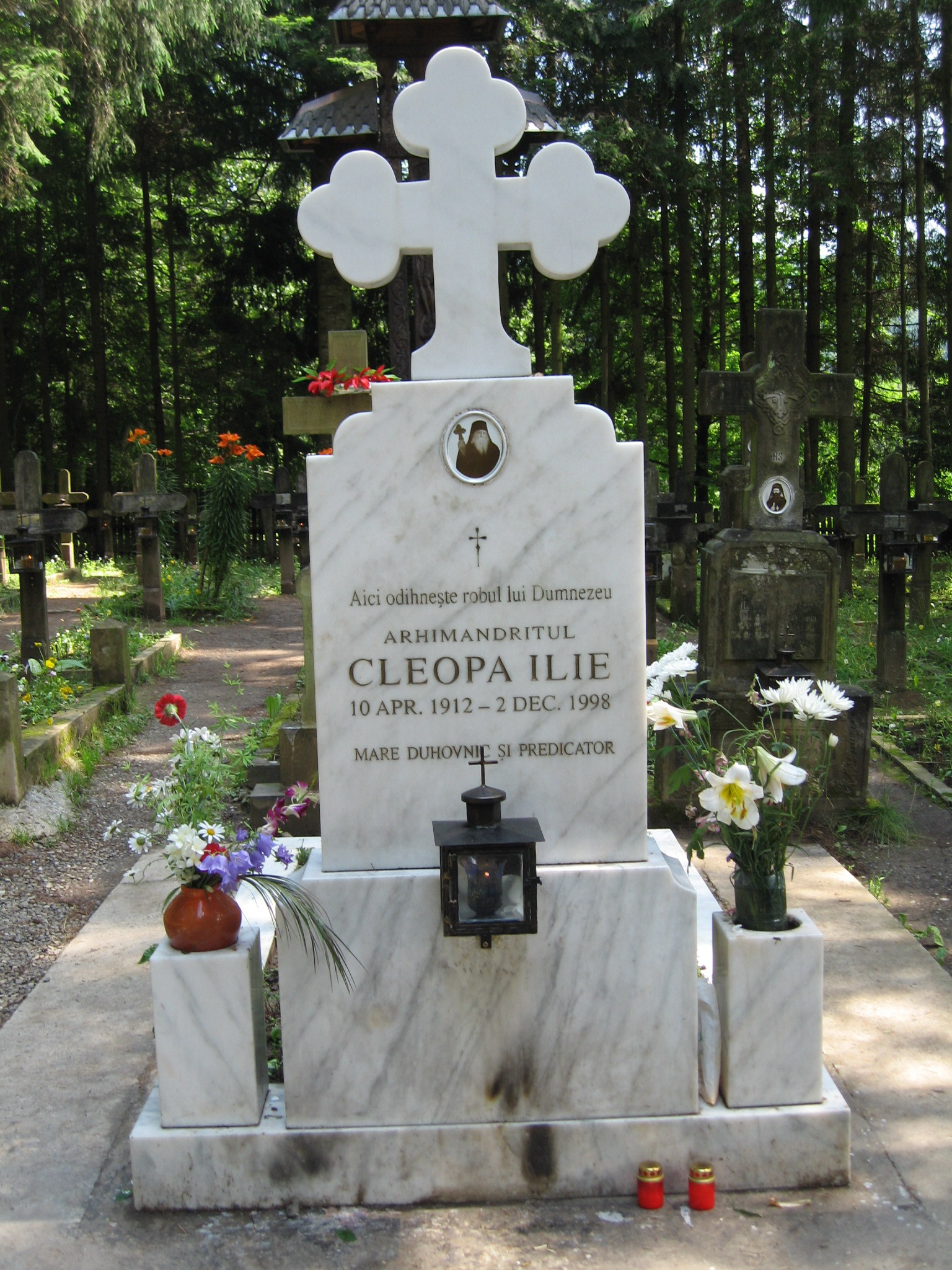
Grave at Sihăstria Monastery

In 1956 he returned to Sihăstria Monastery, where he had been tonsured, and in the spring of 1959, he retired for the third time to the Neamț Mountains, spending the next five years there. He returned to Sihăstria in the fall of 1964, as confessor for the entire community and continued to give spiritual advice to both monks and lay people for the next 34 years. He died on 2 December 1998, at Sihăstria Monastery.

== Reputation ==
He was a strong defender of the traditional Orthodox lifestyle and had a strong influence over later developments in the Romanian Orthodox Church. The current patriarch, Daniel, was one of his disciples along with other current bishops. He would always portray himself as a worthless person and consistently diminished his deeds and suffering during his life.

He was often sought after for advice by various important persons such as politicians and businessmen, whom he received together with common folk. He preached meekness and thorough understanding of the Bible and Holy Tradition.

It is through his meekness, despite his vast power in influencing the Church as well as his vast knowledge, that made him an emblem of the church revival after the 1989 Revolution. He was highly critical of the Ecumenical Movement and devoted much of his time to writing against what he perceived to be Protestant errors. As Protestant evangelism efforts increased in Romania during the 20th Century, he exhorted his countrymen to hold fast to the Orthodox Faith by equipping themselves with the knowledge of the Holy Scriptures and Holy Tradition.

In March 2021, it was revealed that Father Cleopa Ilie was proposed for canonization in 2025, when the Romanian Orthodox Church will celebrate 140 years of autocephaly and 100 years since obtaining the status of a patriarchate.

=== Theology ===
Father Cleopa Ilie was known for his strong stance against any type of pregnancy prevention, including natural family planning, which he deemed to be sinful and worthy of excommunication. He maintained that due to the ancestral sin, all children are born in a state of "defilement" and that without the forgiveness of sins obtained in baptism, it is impossible for them to enter into the Kingdom of Heaven.

=== Glorification ===
On 12 July 2024, during the feast day of Saint Paisios the Athonite, the Holy Synod of the Romanian Church anticipated Father Cleopa's glorification. He was added to the Synaxarion under 2 December, together with his spiritual father Saint Paisie (Olaru).

== Published work ==
- Despre credința ortodoxă ("About Orthodox Faith", Bucuresti, 1981, 280 pages, republished in 1985, then in Galaţi under the title: Călăuza în credința ortodoxă, "Guide to the Orthodox Faith", 1991, 276 pages);
- Predici la praznice împărătești și sfinți de peste an ("Sermons on Religious Feasts and Saints Over the Year", Ed. Episcopiei Românului, 1986, 440 pages);
- Predici la Duminicile de peste an (Sermons on Sundays Over the Year, Ed. Episcopiei Românului, 1990, 560 pages);
- Valoarea sufletului (Value of the Soul, Galați, 1991, 176 pages, republished in Bacău, 1994, 238 pages);
- Urcuș spre înviere (predici duhovnicești) ("Ascent Towards Resurrection (Spiritual Sermons)", Mănăstirea Neamț, 1992, 416 pages);
- Despre vise și vedenii ("About Dreams and Visions", București, 1993, 270 pages);
- La joie de la fidélité, Cerf, Paris, 2009, 432 pp.; ("The Joy of Fidelity")
- Evanghelia slavei lui Hristos. Predici la Duminicile de pe an, Ed. Basilica, Bucharest, 2016, 512 pp.; ("The Gospel of the Glory of God")
- Omagierea satului românesc şi evocarea patriarhilor cărturari: Lucrarea Bisericii în societate în anul 2019, Ed. Basilica, Bucureşti, 2020, 573 pp.. ("Paying Homage to the Romanian Village and Evoking Scholar Patriarchs: The Church’s Work in Society in 2019")
- Numerous articles in different magazines and newspapers, sermons in manuscript

== Studies ==
- Bălan, I., Archim. Elder Cleopa of Sihăstria: In the Tradition of Saint Paisius Velichkovsky. Lake George (CO), 2001.
- Stebbing, N. Bearers of the Spirit: Spiritual Fatherhood in Romanian Orthodoxy. Collegeville, MN, 2003 (Cistercian Studies Series).
