= Štefka =

Štefka is a feminine Slovene given name. Notable people with the name include:

- Štefka Drolc (1923–2018), Slovenian actress
- Štefka Kučan (born 1943), former First Lady of Slovenia

== See also ==
- Stefka
