= Philaret Drozdov =

Russian Orthodox bishop

Saint Philaret of Moscow
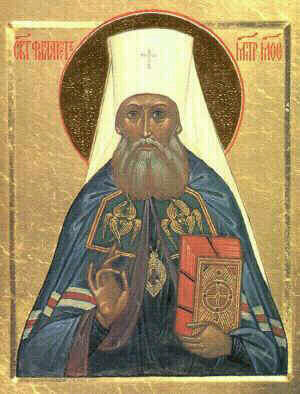
- Icon of St. Philaret

Metropolitan and Archbishop of Moscow
- Born: Vasily Mikhaylovich Drozdov; 26 December 1782; Kolomna, Russian Empire
- Died: 1 December 1867; Trinity Lavra of St. Sergius, Moscow, Russian Empire
- Venerated in: Eastern Orthodox Church
- Canonized: 13 October 1994 by Russian Orthodox Church
- Feast: November 19

Philaret Drozdov
- Church: Russian Orthodox Church
- Installed: 1821
- Term ended: 1867
- Predecessor: Seraphim, Metropolitan of Moscow
- Successor: Innocent of Alaska

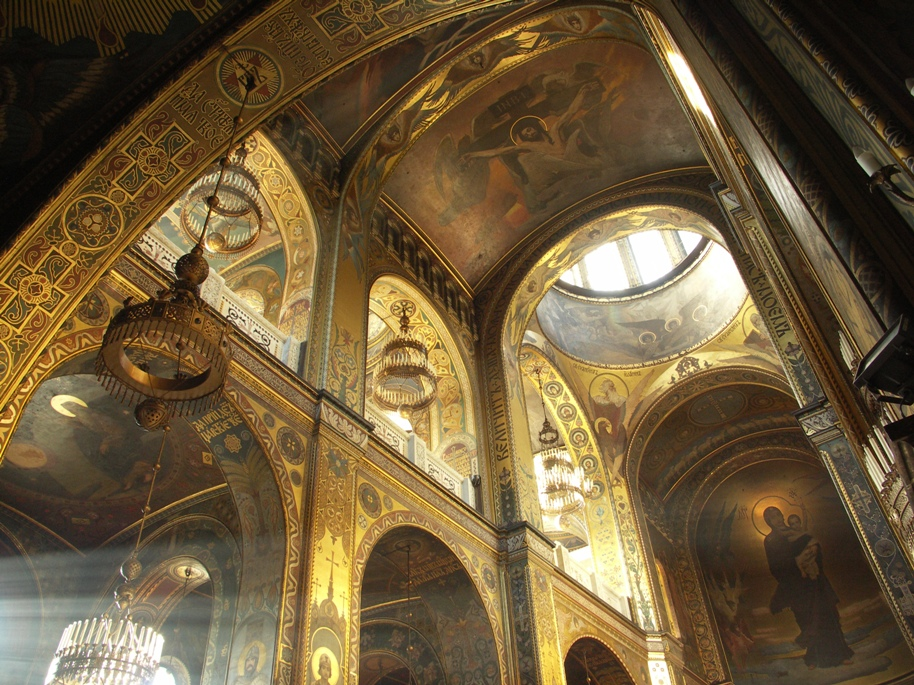
St Vladimir's Cathedral in Kiev was built at the suggestion of Filaret.

Metropolitan Philaret (Real name Vasily Mikhaylovich Drozdov, Василий Михайлович Дроздов; 26 December 1782 – 1 December 1867) was Metropolitan of Moscow and Kolomna and the most influential figure in the Russian Orthodox Church for more than 40 years, from 1821 to 1867.

He was canonized on 13 October 1994 and his feast day is celebrated on November 19.

== Life ==
He was born in Kolomna as Vasily Drozdov (Russian: Василий Михайлович Дроздов). His father was a member of the clergy. Vasily was educated at the seminary of Kolomna, where courses were taught in Latin; and then at the Troitse-Sergiyeva Lavra, and on the completion of his studies was at once appointed professor in the latter. He taught Greek, Hebrew and poetry. He became preacher of the lavra in 1806, and in 1808, received the monastic tonsure and was named Philaret after Saint Philaret the Merciful. In 1809, he was appointed professor of theology in the ecclesiastical academy of Alexander Nevsky Lavra in St. Petersburg, becoming archimandrite in 1811 and director in 1812.

The Events of 1812 produced a strong impression on Philaret; he explained the success of the Russians by moral reason and read a lecture on this theme in the "Society of friends of the Russian word". In 1813 he declaimed his famous speech on Kutuzov's death.

He took monastic vows in 1817, and was soon consecrated bishop of Reval and then episcopal vicar of St. Petersburg. In 1819, he became Archbishop of Tver and a member of the Most Holy Synod. In the following year he was archbishop of Yaroslavl, and in 1821 was translated to Moscow, also becoming metropolitan in 1826.

His daring utterances, however, brought him into imperial disfavor from 1845 until the accession of Alexander II. In 1855 he was restricted to the limits of his diocese. He is said to have prepared Alexander's proclamation freeing the serfs, and he enjoyed the reputation of being one of the leading pulpit orators of his time and country.

He was the spiritual father of missionary hieromonk Macarius (Glukharyov) (1792–1847), canonized in 2000 for his role as "Apostle to the Altai".

Philaret was responsible for some of the worst offences towards the Old Believers, including the misappropriation of churches and the sealing of the altars at the churches of the Rogozhskoye Cemetery, which was the administrative and spiritual center of the Belokrinitskoe Soglasie Old Believers. Philaret was also directly involved in the imprisonment of Old Believer hierarchs and monastics.

== Works ==
Filaret was a prominent figure in preparing a Russian translation of the Bible. Until his time, only a Church Slavonic version not readily understood by the general populace was available. For a time, the Minister of Education was against translations into vernacular languages, and from 1825 to 1856, Filaret concentrated on teaching and clerical duties instead.

He wrote many volumes of theological and historical works collectively known as the Filaretica. They include the Colloquy between a Believer and a Skeptic on the True Doctrine of the Greco-Russian Church (St. Petersburg, 1815); Compend of Sacred History (1816); Commentary on Genesis (1816); Attempt to Explain Psalm lxvii. (1818); Sermons delivered at Various Times (1820); Extracts from the Four Gospels and the Acts of the Apostles for Use in Lay Schools (1820); Christian Catechism (1823); Extracts from the Historical Books of the Old Testament (1828–30); Principles of Religious Instruction (1828); and New Collection of Sermons (1830–36). Filaret also wrote spiritual poems from an early age; his poetical correspondence with Pushkin is well known.

Eastern Orthodox Church titles
Preceded by Seraphim	Metropolitan of Moscow; 1821–1867	Succeeded by Innocent
