= Archbishop of Tsilkani =

List of Orthodox Archbishops of Tsilkani of the Georgian Orthodox and Apostolic Church

List of Orthodox Bishops of Tsilkani of the Georgian Orthodox Church:

- Jesse of Tsilkani, of the Thirteen Assyrian Fathers (6th century)

List of Orthodox Archbishops of Tsilkani of the Georgian Orthodox Church:

- Zosime (present)
