= Renato de Grandis =

Italian composer

- Born: 24 October 1927; Venice, Italy
- Died: 2 December 2008
- Citizenship: Italy
- Education: Conservatorio di Musica Benedetto Marcello di Venezia
- Occupations: Composer, musicologist, writer
- Spouse: Brigitte Grossmann

Renato de Grandis (24 October 1927 – 2 December 2008) was an Italian composer, musicologist, writer and Theosophist. (Note: A 17th century composer and kapellmeister Vincenzo de Grandis was his ancestor.)

== Biography ==
External image
- R. de Grandis

Renato de Grandis was born in 1927 in Venice. He studied piano, conducting, composition, and musicology in Conservatorio di Musica Benedetto Marcello di Venezia. Among his teachers were famous musicians Gian Francesco Malipiero and Bruno Maderna.

=== Music ===
In 1945, Renato, being an eighteen-year-old student, won the first prize in a composition competition organized by the Italian radio, and in 1953, he had the first national award of Italy for composition. In 1959, he settled in Darmstadt, where he lived for about twenty years, then lived in Brussels. He wrote 2 operas, 4 symphonies, 12 sonatas for piano, and other works. De Grandis was an outstanding but atypical figure in the context of avant-garde music of the late 20th century. Frankfurter Allgemeine Zeitung called him an "avant-garde outsider," while the music encyclopedia MGG (1st edition) wrote that "he pointed the way in European musical theatre for decades." He was considered one of the most significant European avant-garde composers. His music was being performed in Darmstadt, Dortmund, Cologne, Kiel, Hanover, Munich, Stuttgart, Wiesbaden, Brussels, Warsaw, Dublin.

=== Theosophy ===
In 1987, de Grandis decided to abandon the composition and, returning to Italy, engaged in philosophy, poetry, painting, and teaching. (Note: The break in a music composing lasted only a few years.) (Note: The documents of the personal archive of de Grandis, acquired in 2018 by the Giorgio Cini Foundation, testify to his interest in Eastern philosophy and literature.) He became interested in research in Kabbalah, Buddhism, and Theosophy. (Note: He dedicated his piano prelude "Midrash" (1998) to Abraham Abulafia, the "Kabbalist and mystic".) During the 1980s, he traveled a lot, especially in southern India.

Prof. Joscelyn Godwin noted that de Grandis was "an active member of the Italian Section" of the Theosophical Society. He was the founder of the International Centre for Theosophical Research in Cervignano del Friuli, which continues to work successfully to this day. He wrote books such as Teosofia di base, Teosofia contemporanea, Theos-Sophia, Abhidharma e Psicologie Occidentali, in addition, he published comments to the Book of Dzyan and The Voice of the Silence by Helena Blavatsky. (Note: In 1999, de Grandis dedicated his piano prelude "Echi" to the president of the Theosophical Society Radha Burnier.)

== Works ==
=== Compositions ===
External videos
- Music by R. de Grandis
- "Clair de lune"
- "Midrash"
- "Antahkarana" (Note: The word "Antahkarana" derives from the Vedantic philosophy.)

- Etudes for flute and piano (1960)
- Canti sulle pause (1961)
- Toccata a doppio coro figurato per due pianoforti (1965)
- Salterio populare, 1 (1968)
- Salterio populare, 2 (1969)
- Second serenade, for solo cello (1970)
- Eduard und Kunegunde (1971)
- Rosenkreuzer-Sonate, seventh piano sonata (1972)
- Preludio ai poemi di Dzyan, for large orchestra (1973)
- Zweite Rosenkreuzer-Sonate, eighth piano sonata (1976)
- Memory of the World: symphonic readings from an unknown archive (1976)
- Memory of the Fire (1983)
- Movimento perpetuo, preludes for piano (1998–2002)

=== Discography ===
- Movimento perpetuo (2013), Antonio Tarallo, piano

=== Books and articles ===
- Teosofia contemporanea
- Teosofia di base
- Theos-Sophia
- Abhidharma e Psicologie Occidentali
- Le Stanze di Dzyan, commentary
- La Voce del Silenzio, commentary
- "Son, musique, creatio"
