= Ulrika Bergquist =

Swedish journalist and television presenter (born 1969)

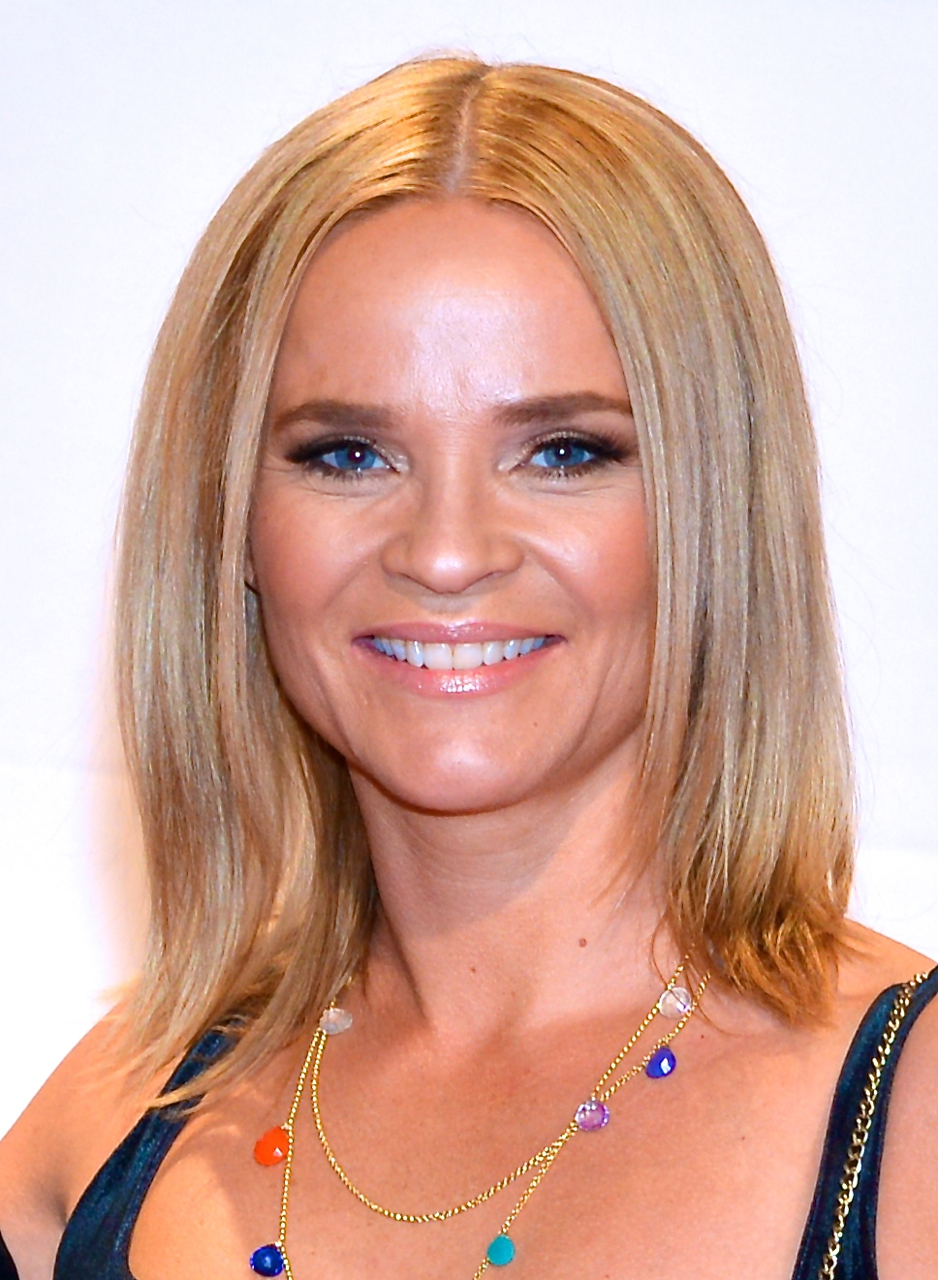
- Berquist in 2013
- Born: 2 December 1969 (age 56)
- Occupation: Television presenter
- Known for: Nyhetsmorgon

Ulrika Bergquist (born 2 December 1969) is a Swedish journalist and television presenter who works for TV4. She is a newsreader for the TV4 News and presenter of Nyhetsmorgon. She was previously the presenter of the TV4 Stockholm local news. She presented Cityliv, Sommarstockholm and Närbilden for the local Stockholm part of the TV4 news. She has also in the mid 1990s worked for Sveriges Radio.
