= Porphyrios of Kafsokalyvia =

Greek Orthodox Hieromonk and Saint

Saint Porphyrios Bairaktaris
- Photo of Porphyrios of Kafsokalyvia

Hieromonk
- Born: February 7, 1906; Evia, Kingdom of Greece
- Hometown: Agios Ioannis
- Residence: Mount Athos; Athens; Oropos, Attica
- Died: December 2, 1991 (aged 85); Mount Athos, Hellenic Republic
- Venerated in: Eastern Orthodox Church
- Canonized: November 27, 2013 by Ecumenical Patriarchate of Constantinople
- Feast: December 2

Saint Porphyrios (Bairaktaris) the Kafsokalyvite (Greek: Ὅσιος Πορφύριος ὁ Καυσοκαλυβίτης; secular name: Evangelos Bairaktaris (Greek: Εὐάγγελος Μπαϊρακτάρης; February 7, 1906 – December 2, 1991) was a Greek Athonite hieromonk who became widely known for his gifts of spiritual discernment. He was canonised as an Eastern Orthodox Saint by the Ecumenical Patriarchate on November 27, 2013.

== Early life ==
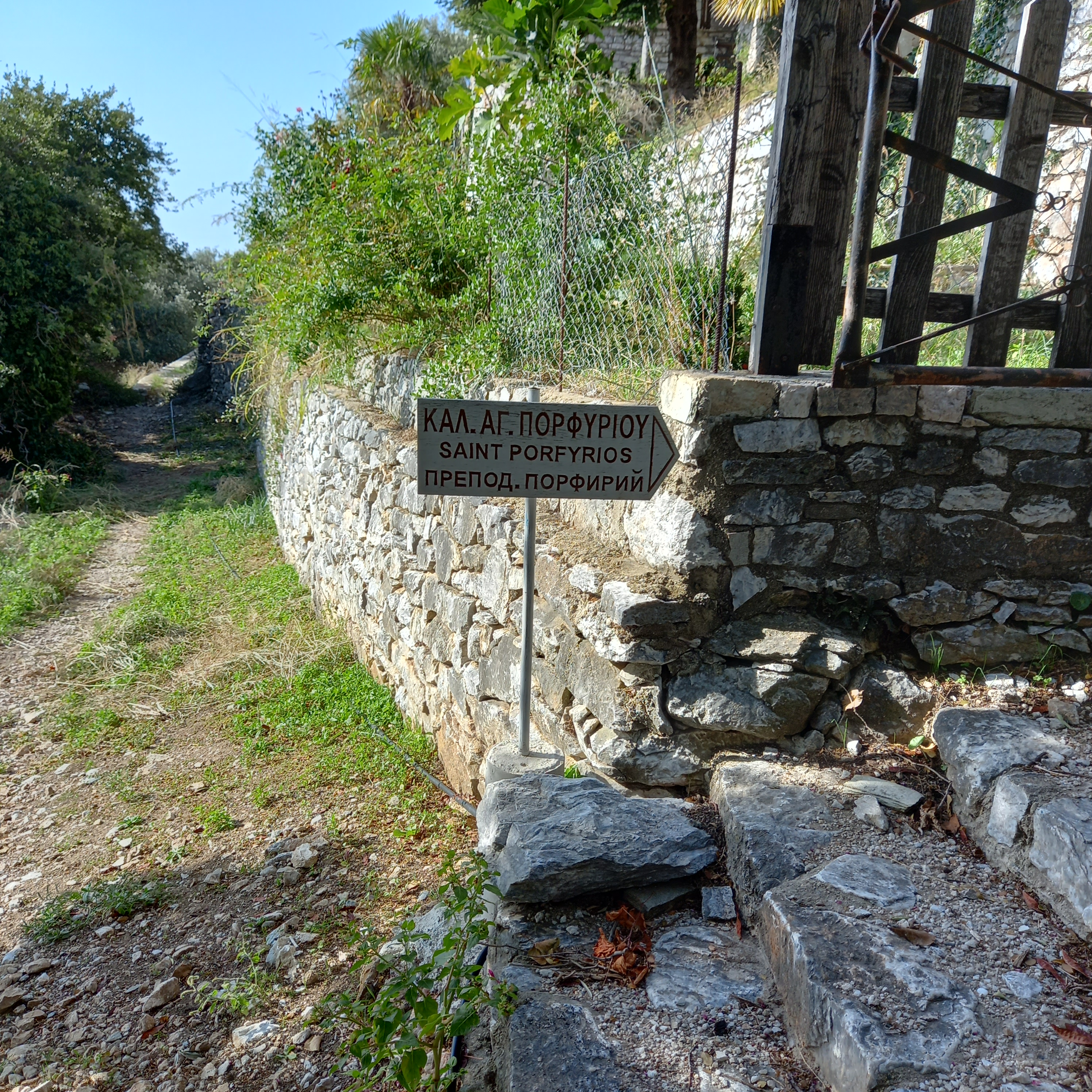
Sign at Kafsokalyvia directing pilgrims to the hut of Saint Porphyrios

St. Porphyrios was born on February 7, 1906, in the village of Agios Ioannis, which translates to St. John Karystia, in the province of Evia in Greece. His parents, Leonidas and Eleni Bairaktaris, baptized him as Evangelos, and he was the fourth out of five siblings. He attended only 2 years of school in his childhood, and instead began work at 8 years old, first tending animals on his family's farm, then in a coal mine, and finally for a grocer in Halkhida and Piraeus. It was during his childhood where it is claimed he wanted to pursue a monastic lifestyle, which he was inspired to do after reading the life of Saint John the Hut-Dweller.

== Clerical career ==
He was tonsured a monk at the age of fourteen with the monastic name Nikitas. He served in the Athonite skete of Kafsokalyvia, in the Cell of St. George, under two spiritual fathers: Fr. Panteleimon and his brother Fr. Ioannikios. Forced by pleurisy to depart the Holy Mountain, he returned to Agios Ioannis, staying at the monastery of Saint Haralambos while back in his birthplace. During this time he was often visited by Bishop Fostimis of Kymi, and through the help of Porphyrios III, Archbishop of Mount Sinai and Raithu, Nikitas was ordained a deacon and then a priest, under the name Porphyrios, at 21 years old. Two years after his ordination, Metropolitan Panteleimon of Karystia appointed him as a father confessor, and later appointed him the office of Archimandrite in 1938.

With the outbreak of World War II, St. Porphyrios became a hospital chaplain in Athens, namely the Polyclinic Hospital, which he served for around 33 years, from 1940 to 1973. During his time there, he was allowed to also serve the Church of Saint Gerasimos by the Professor of Canon Law, Amilkas Alivizatos, and also aided in the renewal of the Church of Saint Nicholas in Kallisia. While working as a chaplain, he had also suffered various afflictions, including a fractured leg, kidney troubles, and a coma.

Following his service as a chaplain, he worked to accomplish his goal of establishing a convent, initially in 1955 with the Holy Monastery of Pendeli, to no success. By 1981, St. Porphyrios had his convent, the Holy Convent of the Transfiguration of the Saviour, recognized by Presidential decree, and although construction work began in 1980, the foundations were not laid until February 1990. Between this time, in 1984, he returned to Mt. Athos, and resumed living in the same cell he occupied prior to his leave. His physical health continued to deteriorate, suffering from a hernia which persisted until his death, a heart attack, and blindness in 1987 caused by a botched operation on his left eye. It was on Mt. Athos where he spent the rest of his life, and wished to have a quiet death, preparing a farewell letter for his spiritual children to avoid a crowd. He died on December 2, 1991, at 4:31 AM, surrounded by a few monks of the holy skete of Kavsokalyvia, and had his death announced at the dawn of December 3.

== Veneration ==
Through his role as a spiritual father, Elder Porphyrios became known to an ever-wider circle of Orthodox followers, and his sainthood was declared by the synod of the Ecumenical Patriarchate on November 27, 2013. In 2014, the Holy Synod of the Russian Orthodox Church decreed that St. Porphyrios' name be added to their church calendar and commemorated on December 2. In 2017, the Holy Synod of the Romanian Orthodox Church also added him to their calendar on December 2. St. Porphyrios, similar to other canonised saints, has his own Akathist that is sung on December 2, his commemoration and feast day. Several compilations of stories and sayings attributed to him have been published since his commemoration as a saint.

=== Eponymy ===
On April 17, 2019, the Chapel of Saint Porphyrios was inaugurated by Metropolitan Panteleimon of Maroneia and Komotini, for the social houses of Agios Stylianos Parish of Komotini. Then, in December 2019, Metropolitan Andrei of Cluj dedicated the chapel of the Rebra-Parva monastery, found in Romania's Bistrița-Năsăud county, to Saint Porphyrios. In January 2021, an Orthodox, English-language, multicultural mission parish dedicated to Saint Porphyrios was formed in Lanark County, Ontario, under Fr. Peter (Craig) Bowers, of the Patriarchate of Constantinople.

== Quotes ==
- This is the way we should see Christ. He is our friend, our brother; He is whatever is good and beautiful. He is everything. Yet, He is still a friend and He shouts it out, "You're my friends, don't you understand that? We're brothers. I'm not...I don't hold hell in my hands. I am not threatening you. I love you. I want you to enjoy life together with me."
- Love Christ and put nothing before His Love. He is joy, He is life, He is light. Christ is Everything. He is the ultimate desire, He is everything. Everything beautiful is in Christ.
- Somebody who is Christ's must love Christ, and when he loves Christ he is delivered from the Devil, from hell and from death.
- The life of the parents is the only thing that makes good children. Parents should be very patient and ‘saintlike’ to their children. They should truly love their children. And the children will share this love! For the bad attitude of the children, says father Porphyrios, the ones who are usually responsible for it are their parents themselves. The parents don't help their children by lecturing them and repeating ‘advice’ to them, or by making them obeying strict rules in order to impose discipline. If the parents do not become ‘saints’ and truly love their children and if they don't struggle for it, then they make a huge mistake. With their wrong and/or negative attitude the parents convey to their children their negative feelings. Then their children become reactive and insecure not only to their home, but to society as well.

== Troparion ==
Troparion — Tone 1

(Podoben: “O citizen of the desert…”)

O ye faithful, let us honor Porphyrios, / the offspring of Euboia the Elder of all Greece, / an initiate of theology, and a true lover of Christ; / from childhood he was filled with divine gifts; / those possessed by demons are delivered, the sick are healed, and they cry with faith: / “Glory to Him Who strengthened you. / Glory to Him Who sanctified you. / Glory to Him Who, through you, works healings for all.”

== Books ==
=== English ===
- Elder Porphyrios from Kausokalibia; Life and Speeches, edition of monastery of Chrysopegi, Chania, Crete, Greece, copyright 2008 email imx@otenet.gr
- Joannidis, Klitos. Elder Porphyrios: Testimonies and Experiences. The Holy Convent of the Transfiguration of the Savior: Athens, 1995. ISBN 9608538238
- Papathanasiou, Athanasios N. A Hesychast from the Holy Mountain in the Heart of a City, (Denise Harvey: Limni 2014), ISBN 978-960-7120-35-9.
- Wounded by Love: The Life and the Wisdom of Saint Porphyrios (Denise Harvey: Limni 2005), ISBN 978-960-7120-19-9, 9th reprinting. (An anthology of letters and other writings by Saint Porphyrios)
- The Holy Stavropegic Monastery of Chrysopigi. Christ is fullness of life. Translated by Fr John Raffan. Chania, Crete, Greece: The Holy Patriarchal Stavropegic Monastery of Chrysopigi, 2016. ISBN 978-960-99691-7-8. (Selections from Wounded by Love)
- Yiannitsiotis, Constantine. With Elder Porphyrios: A Spiritual Child Remembers. The Holy Convent of the Transfiguration of the Savior: Athens, 2001.

=== Greek ===
- Ἁγίου Πορφυρίου. «Θὰ σᾶς πῶ». Ἱερὸν Ἡσυχαστήριον «Ἡ Μεταμόρφωσις τοῦ Σωτῆρος». 2015 („I will tell you“. Written narratives from recordings of the Saint about his life)
- Ησυχαστήριον Οσίου Πορφυρίου Καυσοκαλυβίτου. «Ανθολόγιο Θαυμάτων», 2017.
- Ἁγίου Πορφυρίου. Θεία Λειτουργία με τον Άγιο Πορφύριο τον Καυσοκαλυβίτη. Βιβλίο με δίσκο. 2018
- Ησυχαστήριον Οσίου Πορφυρίου Καυσοκαλυβίτου. «΄Ενας να με ακούσει και θα του στείλει ο Θεός πλούσια τη χάρη του», 2018.
- Ησυχαστήριον Οσίου Πορφυρίου Καυσοκαλυβίτου. «Συμβουλές για την πνευματική ζωή στην οικογένεια», 2018. (Advices for the spiritual life within the family)
