= Stefka Petrova =

Bulgarian nutritionist

- Born: 10 February 1950 (age 76)
- Occupations: Nutritionist, MD
- Title: Director of National Center of Public Health Protection (NCPHP)

Stefka Petrova (Bulgarian: Стефка Петрова), (b. 1950) is a Bulgarian nutritionist and the director of the National Center of Public Health Protection (NCPHP), Sofia, Bulgaria. She is also a national consultant on nutrition at the Bulgarian Ministry of Health. She holds a Doctor of Medicine degree and PhD from Sofia Medical University.
