= Ed Botterell =

Canadian sailor (1931–2024)

Edward Botterell (24 January 1931 – 2 December 2024) was a Canadian sailor who competed in the 1964 Summer Olympics.

== Biography ==
In 1947, Botterell represented the Royal St. Lawrence Yacht Club for the right to represent Canada in the first Olympic games after World War 2. Botterell sailed the International 14 in the 1940s and 1950s, and then sailed Lightnings at an international level from the early 1950s.

Botterell died on 2 December 2024, at the age of 93.
