= List of Bulgarians =

Flag of Bulgaria

This is a list of famous or notable Bulgarians throughout history.

== Bulgarian monarchs ==
- Kubrat
- Batbayan
- Asparukh of Bulgaria
- Tervel of Bulgaria
- Kormesiy of Bulgaria
- Sevar of Bulgaria
- Kormisosh of Bulgaria
- Vinekh of Bulgaria
- Telets of Bulgaria
- Sabin of Bulgaria
- Umor of Bulgaria
- Toktu of Bulgaria
- Pagan of Bulgaria
- Telerig of Bulgaria
- Kardam of Bulgaria
- Krum of Bulgaria
- Omurtag of Bulgaria
- Malamir of Bulgaria
- Presian of Bulgaria
- Boris I Michael
- Simeon the Great
- Peter I of Bulgaria
- Boris II of Bulgaria
- Roman of Bulgaria
- Samuil of Bulgaria
- Gavril Radomir of Bulgaria
- Ivan Vladislav of Bulgaria
- Presian II of Bulgaria
- Peter (II) Delyan of Bulgaria
- Constantin Bodin (Peter (III))
- Ivan Asen I of Bulgaria
- Peter IV of Bulgaria
- Kaloyan of Bulgaria
- Boril of Bulgaria
- Ivan Asen II of Bulgaria
- Kaliman I of Bulgaria
- Michael Asen I of Bulgaria
- Kaliman II of Bulgaria
- Mitso Asen of Bulgaria
- Constantine Tikh of Bulgaria
- Michael Asen II of Bulgaria
- Ivaylo of Bulgaria
- Ivan Asen III of Bulgaria
- George I of Bulgaria
- Smilets of Bulgaria
- Chaka of Bulgaria
- Theodore Svetoslav of Bulgaria
- George II of Bulgaria
- Michael III Shishman of Bulgaria
- Ivan Stephen of Bulgaria
- Ivan Alexander of Bulgaria
- Ivan Shishman of Bulgaria
- Ivan Sratsimir of Bulgaria
- Constantine II of Bulgaria
- Alexander I of Bulgaria
- Ferdinand I of Bulgaria
- Boris III of Bulgaria
- Simeon II of Bulgaria

== Performing arts ==
=== Directors ===
- Stephen C. Apostolof
- Christo Christov
- Slatan Dudow
- Georgi Djulgerov
- Tonislav Hristov
- Lyudmil Kirkov
- Nikola Korabov
- Nikola Kovachev
- Vulo Radev
- Petar B. Vasilev
- Binka Zhelyazkova
- Ted Kotcheff

=== Actors ===
See also List of Bulgarian actors

- Zahari Baharov
- Maria Bakalova
- George Baker
- Nikolay Binev
- Radina Borshosh
- Stefan Danailov
- Nina Dobrev
- Yana Marinova
- Itzhak Fintzi
- Georgi Georgiev
- Georgi Georgiev-Getz
- Kiril Gospodinov
- Stanislav Ianevski
- Gloria Ivanova
- Georgi Kaloyanchev
- Apostol Karamitev
- Nevena Kokanova
- Todor Kolev
- Victoria Koleva
- Julian Kostov
- Marius Kurkinski
- Moni Moshonov (born 1951), Bulgarian-born Israeli actor and comedian
- Stoyanka Mutafova
- Lyubomir Neikov
- Georgi Partsalev
- Katya Paskaleva
- Bashar Rahal
- Hristo Shopov
- Naum Shopov
- Petar Slabakov
- Kosta Tsonev
- Grigor Vachkov

=== Models ===
- Silvia Dimitrova
- Nina Dobrev
- Nansi Karaboycheva
- Yana Marinova
- Diliana Popova

=== Dancers ===
- Cyril Atanassoff
- Asen Gavrilov

== Journalists ==
- Oggy Boytchev
- Vasil Kanchov
- Nikolay Kolev - Michmana
- Kiril Valchev
- Elena Yoncheva

== Television ==
- Todor Kolev
- Niki Kunchev
- Milen Tsvetkov
- Aleksandra Sarchadjieva
- Slavi Trifonov
- Ralitsa Vassileva

== Literature ==
=== Authors ===
- Elisaveta Bagryana
- Petar Beron
- Ran Bosilek
- Assen Bossev
- Hristo Botev
- Elias Canetti
- Dobri Chintulov
- Chudomir
- Clement of Ohrid
- Constantine of Preslav
- Atanas Dalchev
- Dimcho Debelyanov
- Alexenia Dimitrova
- Dimitar Dimov
- Vasil Drumev
- Petya Dubarova
- John Exarch
- Dora Gabe
- Nikolai Haitov
- Paisiy Hilendarski
- Chernorizetz Hrabar
- Nikolai Hristozov
- Angel Karaliychev
- Lyuben Karavelov
- Stefan Kisyov
- Aleko Konstantinov
- Miladinov Brothers
- Aleksandra Monedzhikova
- Grigor Parlichev
- Elin Pelin
- Ivailo Petrov
- Valeri Petrov
- Julian Popov
- Maria Popova
- Yordan Radichkov
- Radoy Ralin
- Kuzman Shapkarev
- Pencho Slaveykov
- Petko Slaveykov
- Hristo Smirnenski
- Emiliyan Stanev
- Zahari Stoyanov
- Anton Strashimirov
- Stanislav Stratiev
- Edvin Sugarev
- Dimitar Talev
- Tzvetan Todorov
- Stefan Tzanev
- Nikola Vaptsarov
- Ivan Vazov
- Pavel Vezhinov
- Vladislav the Grammarian
- Dobri Voinikov
- Sofronii Vrachanski
- Peyo Yavorov
- Nedyalko Yordanov
- Yordan Yovkov

== Music ==
=== Composers ===
See also List of Bulgarian composers

- Nikola Atanasov
- Victor Chuchkov
- Alexandra Fol
- Marin Goleminov
- Michail Goleminov
- Dobri Hristov
- Nikolay Kaufman
- Nikolo Kotzev
- Petar Krumov
- John Kukuzelis
- Filip Kutev
- Kiril Lambov
- Milcho Leviev
- Emanuil Manolov
- Georgi Minchev
- Dimitar Nenov
- Ivo Papasov
- Albena Petrovic-Vratchanska
- Stefan Popov
- Anna-Maria Ravnopolska-Dean
- Petko Stainov
- Dobrinka Tabakova
- Ralitsa Tcholakova
- Georgi Tutev
- Stefan Valdobrev
- Pancho Vladigerov

=== Singers and musicians ===
See also List of Bulgarian musicians and singers

- 100 Kila
- Alexis Weissenberg
- Andrea
- Angela Tosheva
- Azis
- Boris Christoff
- Christina Morfova
- Desi Slava
- Elena Nicolai
- Elitsa Todorova
- Emil Dimitrov
- Filipp Kirkorov
- Gena Dimitrova
- Georgi Minchev
- Gery-Nikol
- Gloria
- Ivan Yanakov
- Ivanka Ninova
- Ivo Papasov
- Kamen Tchanev
- Kristian Kostov
- Kiril Marichkov
- Lili Ivanova
- Ljuba Welitsch
- Ludmilla Diakovska
- Marius Kurkinski
- Mira Aroyo
- Nayden Todorov
- Neva Krysteva
- Nicolai Ghiaurov
- Nikola Giuzelev
- Petia
- Poli Genova
- Raina Kabaivanska
- Ralitsa Tcholakova
- Slavi Trifonov
- Spens
- Stefan Valdobrev
- Svetla Protich
- Sylvie Vartan
- Theodosii Spassov
- Triphon Silyanovski
- Valya Balkanska
- Vassil Naidenov
- Vesselina Kasarova
- Yildiz Ibrahimova
- Yoan Kukuzel

== Visual arts ==
=== Architects ===
- Victoria Angelova
- Milka Bliznakov
- Kolyu Ficheto
- Georgi Fingov
- Naum Torbov

=== Painters ===
- Angel Metodiev
- Bencho Obreshkov
- Boris Georgiev
- Christo Yavashev – Christo
- Chudomir
- Dechko Uzunov
- Dimitre Mehandjiysky
- Ekaterina Savova-Nenova
- George Papazov
- Hristofor Zhefarovich
- Ilia Beshkov
- Ivan Markvichka
- Ivan Nenov
- Ivan Vukadinov
- Jules Pascin
- Keratza Vissulceva
- Konstantin Shtarkelov
- Nikola Avramov
- Nikola Marinov
- Radi Nedelchev
- Silvia Dimitrova
- Vladimir Dimitrov - Maistora
- Yaroslav Veshin
- Yanko Tihov
- Zahariy Zograf
- Zlatyu Boyadzhiev

=== Sculptors ===
- Ivan Minekov
- Christo
- Todor Todorov
- Vezhdi Rashidov

=== Others ===
- Annie Ivanova, arts curator
- Christo Vladimirov Javacheff, along with Jeanne-Claude
- Peter Lazarov, graphic artist
- Alex Maleev, cartoonist
- Toma Tomov, graphic artist

== Business ==
- Emil Kyulev
- Georgi Naydenov
- Iliya Pavlov
- Kroum Pindoff

== State ==
=== Politicians ===
- Georgi Atanasov
- Prince Alexander of Battenberg
- Nikola Mushanov
- Boyko Borisov
- Todor Burmov
- Teodor Teodorov
- Filip Dimitrov
- Georgi Dimitrov
- Konstantin Dimitrov
- Simeon Djankov
- Kimon Georgiev
- Reneta Indzhova
- Vasil Kolarov
- Ivan Kostov
- Andrey Lukanov
- Nadezhda Mihailova
- Georgi Parvanov
- Solomon Pasi
- Krasimir Premyanov
- Rumen Radev
- Vasil Radoslavov
- Simeon Saxe-Coburg-Gotha
- Iliana Iotova, the first female president of Bulgaria and the current one since 2026
- Aleksandar Stamboliyski
- Stefan Stambolov
- Nadejda Stancioff
- Aleksandar Malinov
- Petar Stoyanov
- Andrey Lyapchev
- Zhan Videnov
- Zhelyu Zhelev
- Todor Zhivkov

=== Revolutionaries ===
- Todor Aleksandrov
- Georgi Benkovski
- Dame Gruev
- Gotse Delchev
- Tsanko Dyustabanov
- Hadzhi Dimitar
- Ilarion Dragostinov
- Panayot Hitov
- Todor Kableshkov
- Stefan Karadzha
- Lyuben Karavelov
- Nikola Karev
- Asen Kojarov
- Vasil Levski
- Ivan Mihailov
- Georgi Obretenov
- Nikola Obretenov
- Tonka Obretenova
- Gjorche Petrov
- Kosta Shahov
- Yane Sandanski
- Boris Sarafov
- Georgi Sava Rakovski
- Hristo Tatarchev
- Filip Totyu
- Panayot Volov
- Stoyan Zaimov
- Hristo Botev
- Mara Buneva

=== Voivodes ===
- Angel
- Apostol Petkov
- Chavdar
- Ilyo
- Indzhe
- Karposh
- Manush
- Kapitan Petko Voyvoda

== Academics ==
- Stephan Angeloff, microbiologist
- Krassimir Atanassov, mathematician
- Angel Balevski, inventor
- Petar Beron, educator
- Veselin Beshevliev, classicist
- Georgi Bliznakoff, chemist
- Kiril Bratanov, biologist
- Ljubomir Chakaloff, mathematician
- George Chaldakov, vascular biologist
- Stamen Grigorov, physician
- Asen Hadjiolov, biologist
- Anastas Ishirkov, human geographer
- Christo Ivanov, organic chemist
- Assen Jordanoff, airplane constructor
- Rostislaw Kaischew, physical chemist
- Ludmil Katzarkov, mathematician
- Georgi Kitov, archaeologist
- Boicho Kokinov, cognitive scientist
- Boris Komitov, astronomer
- Mimoza Konteva, geographer
- Georgi Lozanov, psychologist
- Georgi Manev, physicist
- Stefan Marinov, dissident physicist
- Marco Mincoff, literary scholar
- Nikola Mollov, organic chemist
- Georgi Nadjakov, physicist, discovered the external photoeffect
- Nikola Obreshkov, mathematician
- Dimiter Orahovats, physiologist
- Dimitar Paskov, pharmacist and chemist
- Angel Penchev, neurologist
- Peter Petroff, prolific inventor
- Ivan Atanassov Petrov, neurologist
- Stefka Petrova, nutritionist
- Dimitar Sasselov, astrophysicist
- Blagovest Sendov, mathematician
- Ivan Stranski, physical chemist, proposed the mechanism of Stranski-Krastanov growth
- Elka Todorova, social psychologist
- Venelin Tsachevsky, economist
- Evgeny Vatev, physicist, inventor
- Asen Zlatarov, chemist
- Vasil Zlatarski, historian
- Dimitar Kalev, humanities scholar, oncologist, poet

=== Economists ===
- Stoyan Alexandrov
- Lyuben Berov
- Martin Dimitrov
- Simeon Djankov
- Kristalina Georgieva
- Nikolay Nenovsky
- Antoaneta Vassileva

=== Philosophers ===
- Peter Deunov
- Julia Kristeva
- Isaac Passy
- Tzvetan Todorov
- Maria Todorova

== Sports ==
=== Athletics ===
- Rostislav Dimitrov, triple jumper
- Yordanka Donkova, world record holder and one world title in hurdling (1988)
- Stefka Kostadinova, world record holder and two world titles in high jump (1987, 1995)
- Tereza Marinova, triple jumper
- Khristo Markov, 1988 Olympic triple jump champion
- Petya Pendareva, sprinter
- Iva Prandzheva, long jumper and triple jumper

=== Boxing ===
- Georgi Kostadinov, boxer, won the Olympic Flyweight gold medal at the 1972 Munich Olympic Games for Bulgaria
- Daisy Lang, boxer, world champion in three different weight categories
- Ivailo Marinov, boxer, won the Olympic Flyweight gold medal at the 1988 Seoul Olympic Games, among others
- Kubrat Pulev, boxer
- Tervel Pulev, boxer
- Svilen Rusinov, boxer
- Dimitar Shtilianov, boxer
- Serafim Todorov, boxer, won the Olympic Featherweight Silver medal at the 1996 Atlanta Olympic Games

=== Chess ===
- Ivan Cheparinov, chess player
- Antoaneta Stefanova, Women's World Chess Champion (2004)
- Silvio Danailov, chess player and manager
- Veselin Topalov, World Chess Champion (2005)

=== Volleyball ===
- Aleksandra Delcheva
- Strashimira Filipova
- Lyubomir Ganev
- Evgeni Ivanov
- Matey Kaziyski
- Plamen Konstantinov
- Nikolay Nikolov
- Vladimir Nikolov
- Teodor Salparov
- Martin Stoev
- Hristo Tsvetanov
- Eva Yaneva
- Boyan Yordanov
- Ivan Zarev
- Antonina Zetova
- Andrey Zhekov
- Dimitar Zlatanov

=== Football ===
- Georgi Asparuhov
- Krassimir Balakov
- Dimitar Berbatov
- Hristo Bonev
- Dinko Dermendzhiev
- Petar Houbchev
- Trifon Ivanov
- Ivan Kolev
- Emil Kostadinov
- Nikola Kotkov
- Yordan Letchkov
- Stanislav Manolev
- Borislav Mihaylov
- Dimitar Penev
- Luboslav Penev
- Martin Petrov
- Stiliyan Petrov
- Aleksandar Shalamanov
- Nasko Sirakov
- Hristo Stoichkov
- Darin Todorov
- Emil Urumov
- Dimitar Yakimov
- Zlatko Yankov
- Petar Zhekov
- Andrey Zhelyazkov

=== Tennis ===
- Grigor Dimitrov
- Katerina Maleeva
- Magdalena Maleeva
- Manuela Maleeva
- Tsvetana Pironkova

=== Other sports ===
- Blagoy Blagoev, silver medalist in Olympic Games (1980) and all-time senior world record holder in snatch (195.5 kg, competing at 90 kg)
- Nikolay Bukhalov, two Olympic and five world titles in canoeing
- Albena Denkova, World Figure Skating Champion in ice dancing (pairs) (2006, 2007)
- Vasil Etropolski (born 1959), Olympic and world champion sabre fencer
- Georgi Georgiev, two world titles in Sambo (2003, 2006)
- Maria Gigova, three rhythmic gymnastics world titles (1969, 1971, 1973), Guinness World Records
- Mariya Grozdeva, sport shooter
- Ivan Ivanov, Olympic weightlifter
- Tanyu Kiryakov, pistol shooter
- Dan Kolov, wrestler
- Kaloyan Mahlyanov (Kotooshu), sumo wrestler
- Maria Petrova, three rhythmic gymnastics world titles (1993, 1994, 1995), Guinness World Records
- Hristo Prodanov, mountaineer
- Evgeniya Radanova, speed skater and racing cyclist
- Neshka Robeva, rhythmic gymnast
- Alexander Rusev, wrestler, rower and powerlifter
- Valentin Yordanov, two Olympic, seven world and seven European titles in wrestling
- Yordan Yovchev, world champion and six-time Olympic gymnast

== Theology ==
- Antim I
- Evtimiy of Tarnovo
- Vladislav the Grammarian
- Peter Deunov (Master Beinsa Douno), founder of the Universal White Brotherhood

== Cuisine ==
- Vasil Eshcoff
- Silvena Rowe
- Kiradjieff brothers
- Ivan Zvezdev

== Criminals ==
- Borislav Georgiev
- Emil Kyulev
- Georgi Iliev
- Georgi Stoev
- Iliya Pavlov
- Konstantin "Samokovetsa" Dimitrov
- Vasil Iliev
- Delyan Peevski

== Gallery ==
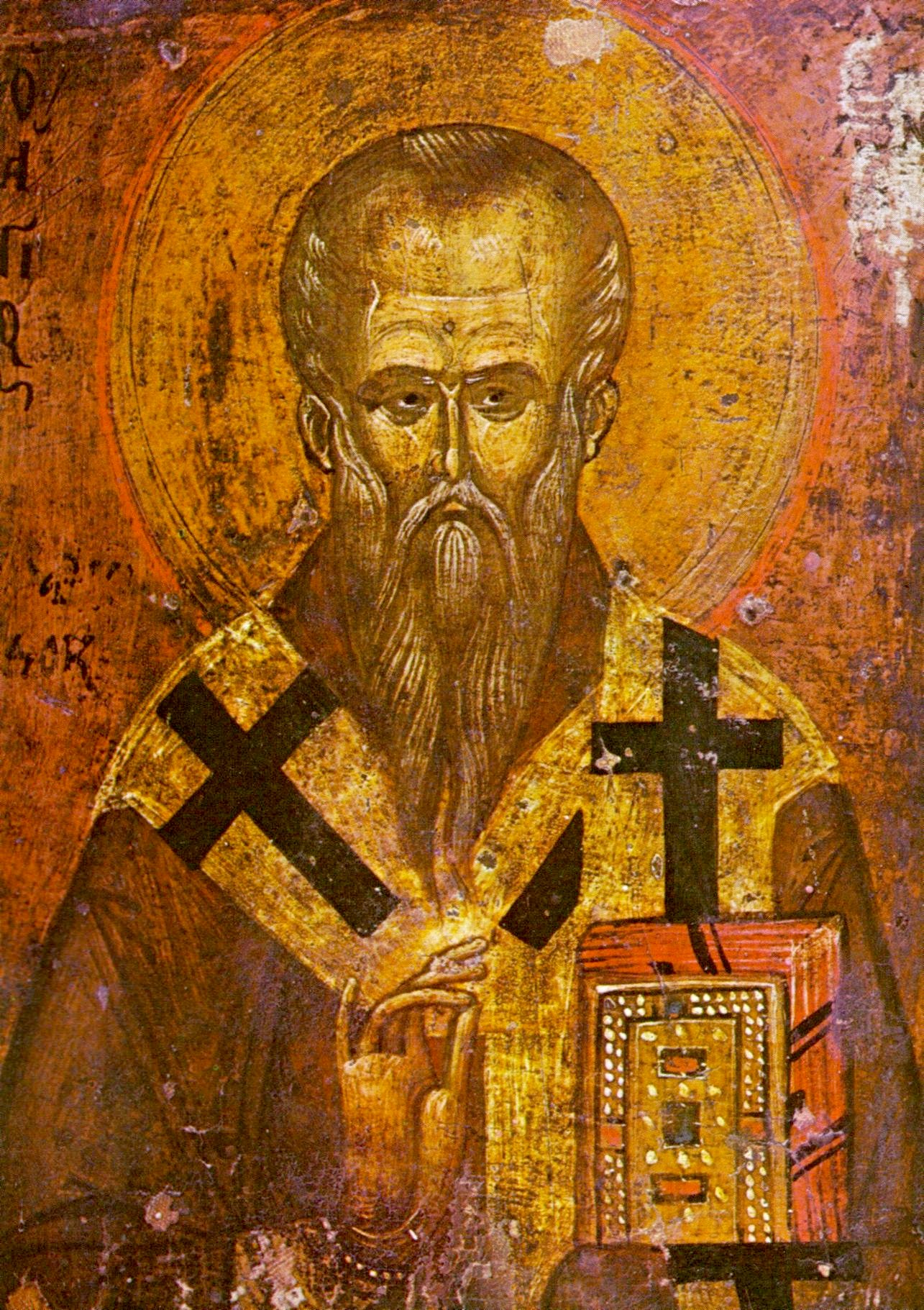
Saint Clement of Ohrid (840–916), often associated as the creator of the Cyrillic script

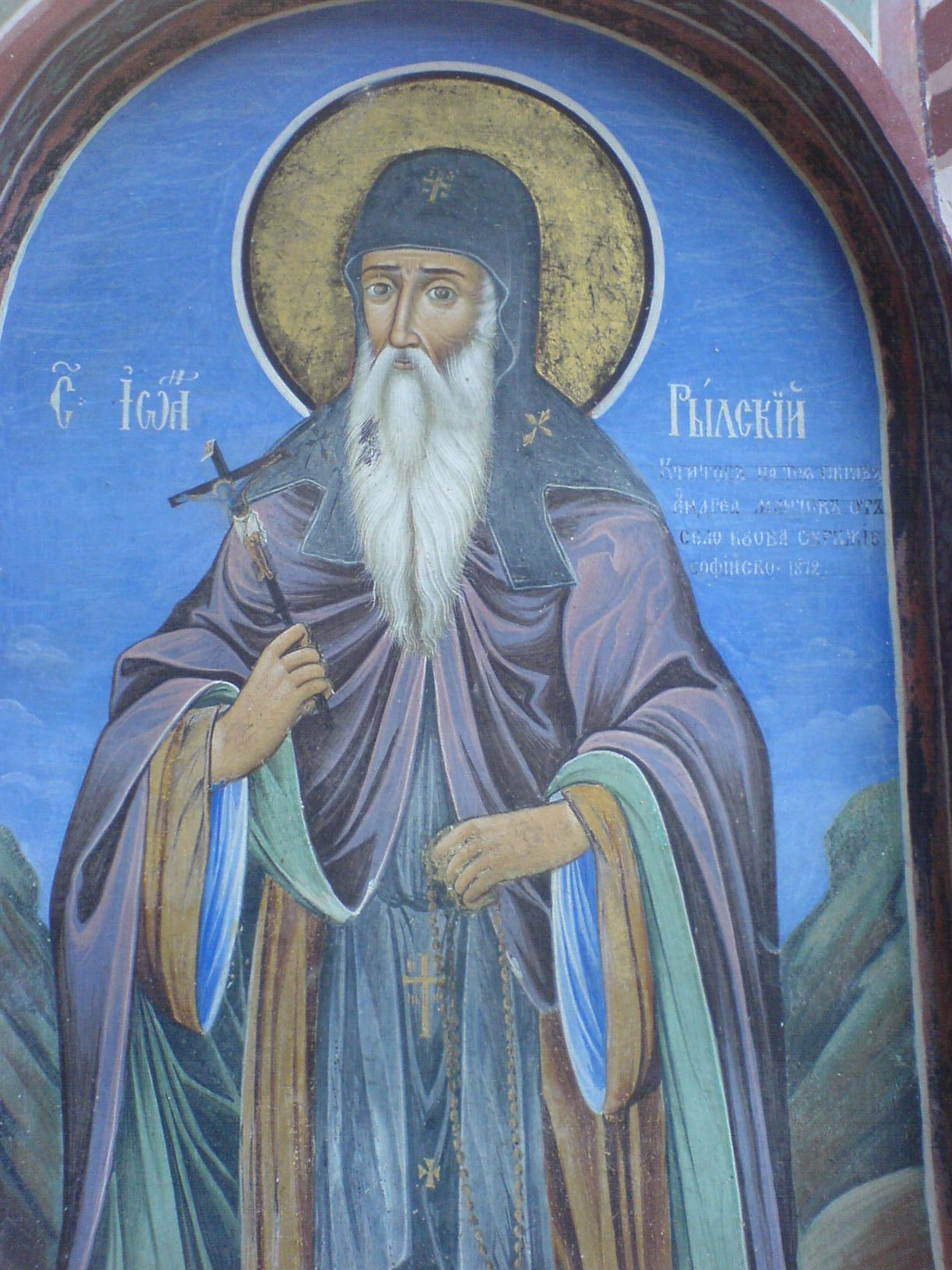
Saint Ivan of Rila (876–946), the patron saint of the Bulgarian people

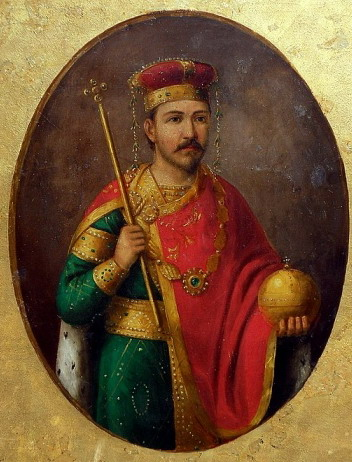
Tsar Ivan-Asen II (1191–1241), led the Second Bulgarian Empire to its largest territorial extent

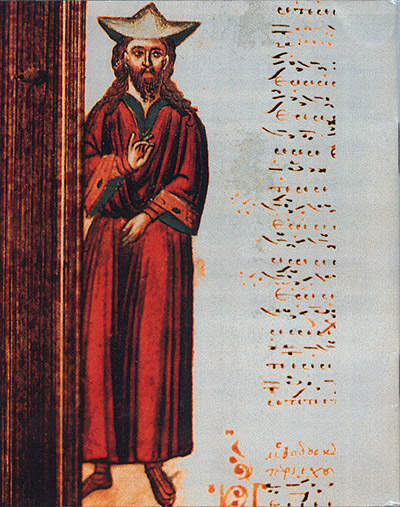
Saint John Kukuzel (1280–1360), composer, singer and reformer of the Orthodox Church music, known as the "Angel-voiced"

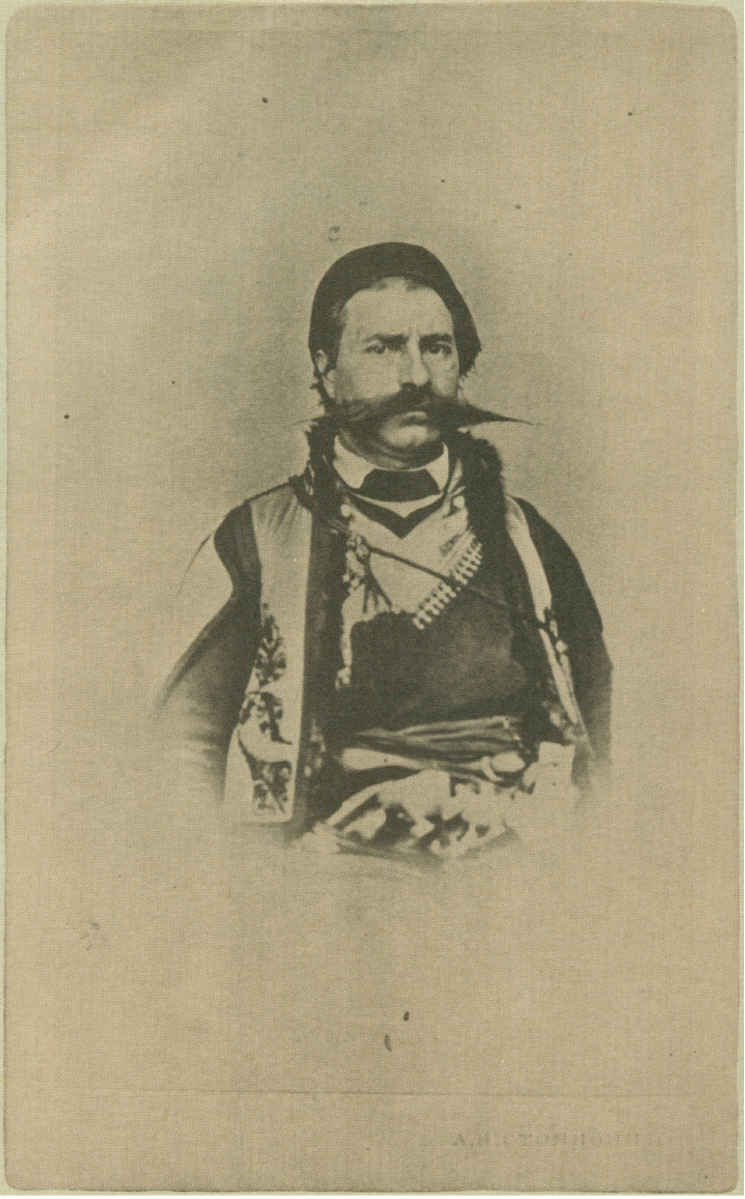
Panayot Hitov (1830–1918), revolutionary, hajduk and voivode, national hero of Bulgaria

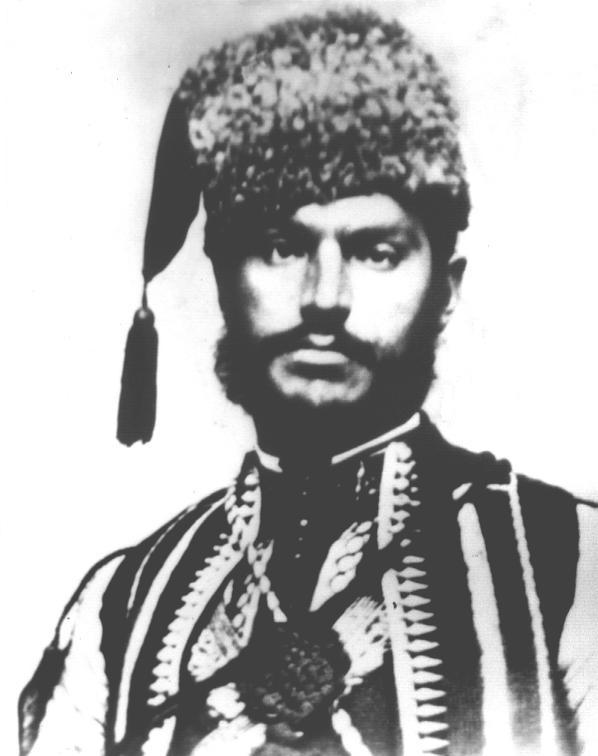
Stefan Karadzha (1840–1868), revolutionary, voivode, national hero of Bulgaria

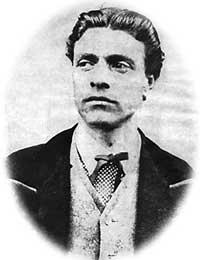
Vasil Levski (1837–1873), revolutionary and national hero of Bulgaria

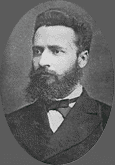
Hristo Botev (1848–1876), revolutionary and poet, national hero of Bulgaria

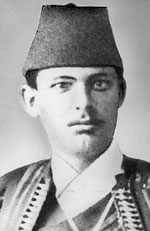
Georgi Benkovski (1843–1876), revolutionary and national hero of Bulgaria

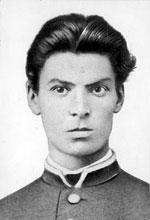
Panayot Volov (1850–1876), revolutionary and national hero of Bulgaria

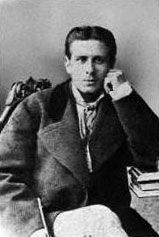
Todor Kableshkov (1851–1876), revolutionary and national hero of Bulgaria

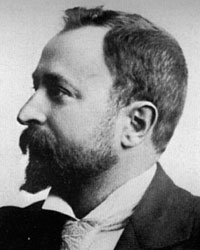
Aleko Konstantinov (1863–1897), writer created one of the most popular Bulgarian works

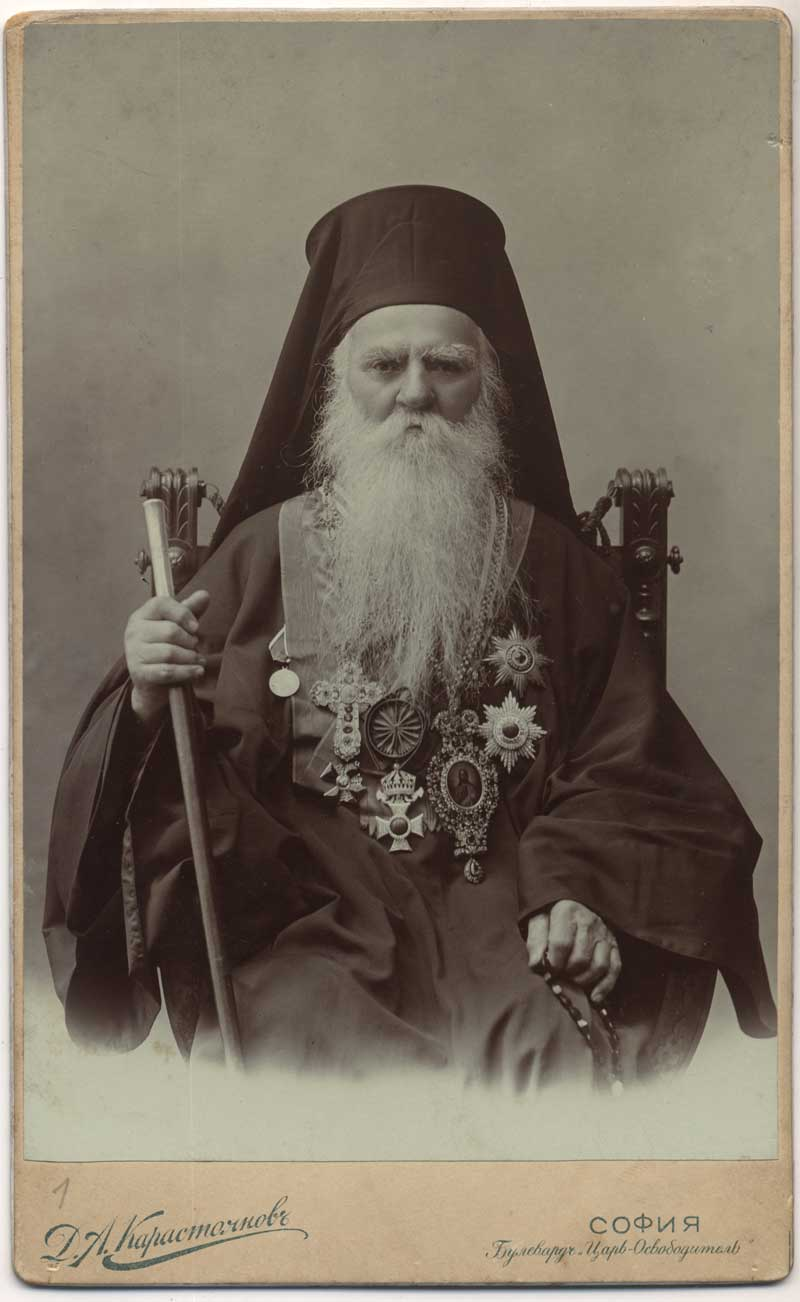
Metropolitan Nathanael Ohridski (1820–1906), revolutionary and organizer of the Kresna-Razlog Uprising

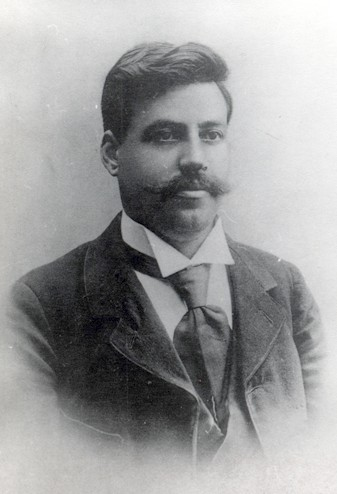
Gotse Delchev (1872–1903), revolutionary and leader of the Bulgarian Macedonian-Adrianople Revolutionary Committees

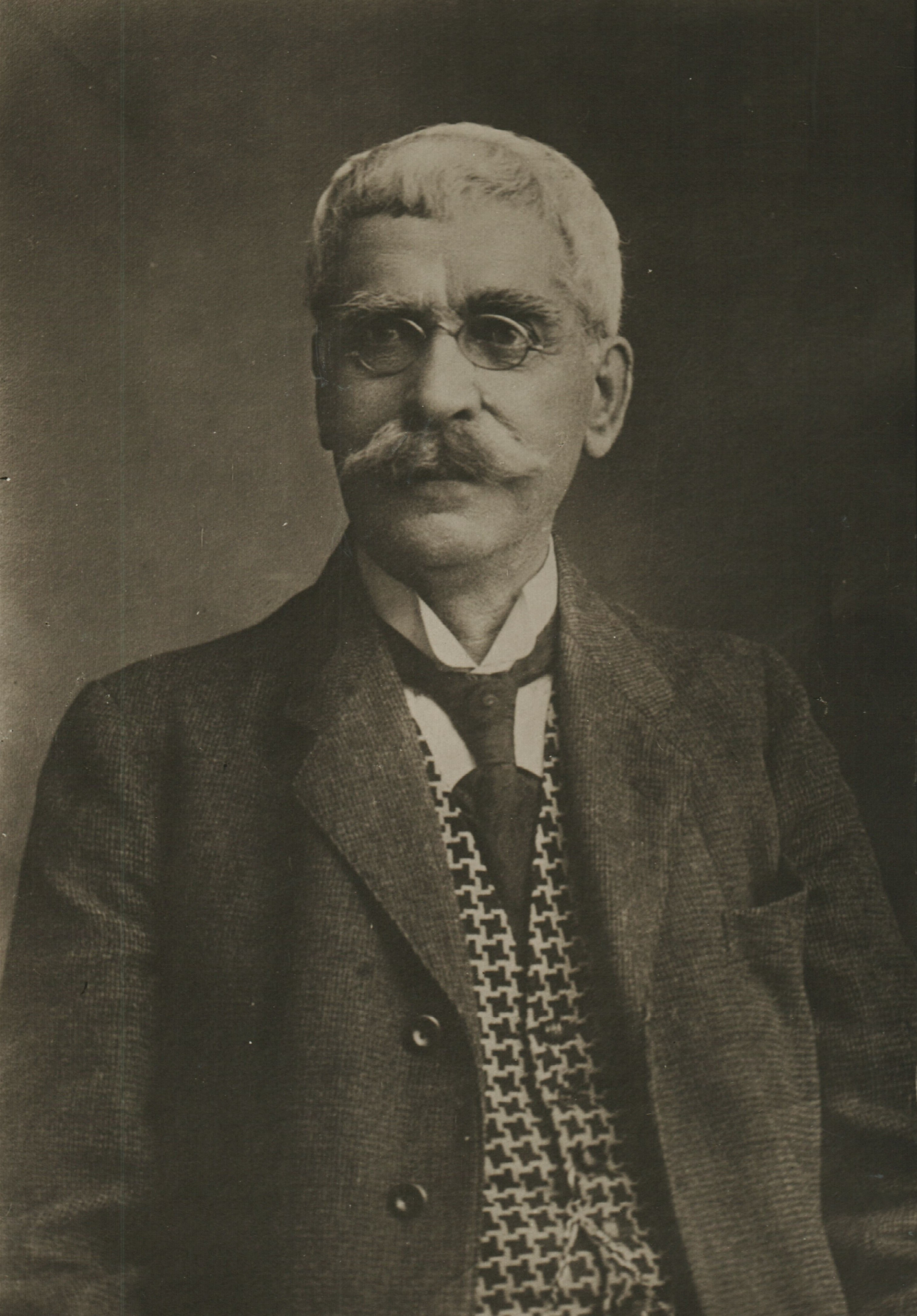
Ivan Vazov (1850–1921), considered as the best Bulgarian author of all time

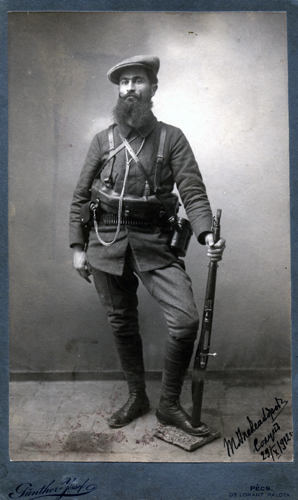
Todor Aleksandrov (1881–1924), revolutionary and leader of the Internal Macedonian Revolutionary Organization, national hero of Bulgaria

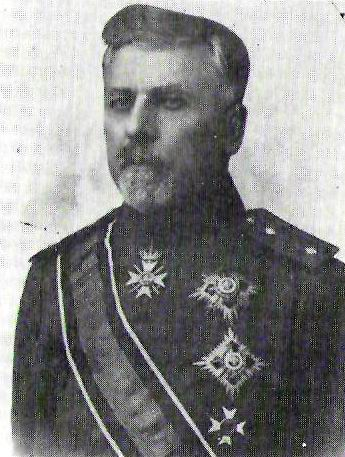
Vladimir Vazov (1868–1945), general and war hero

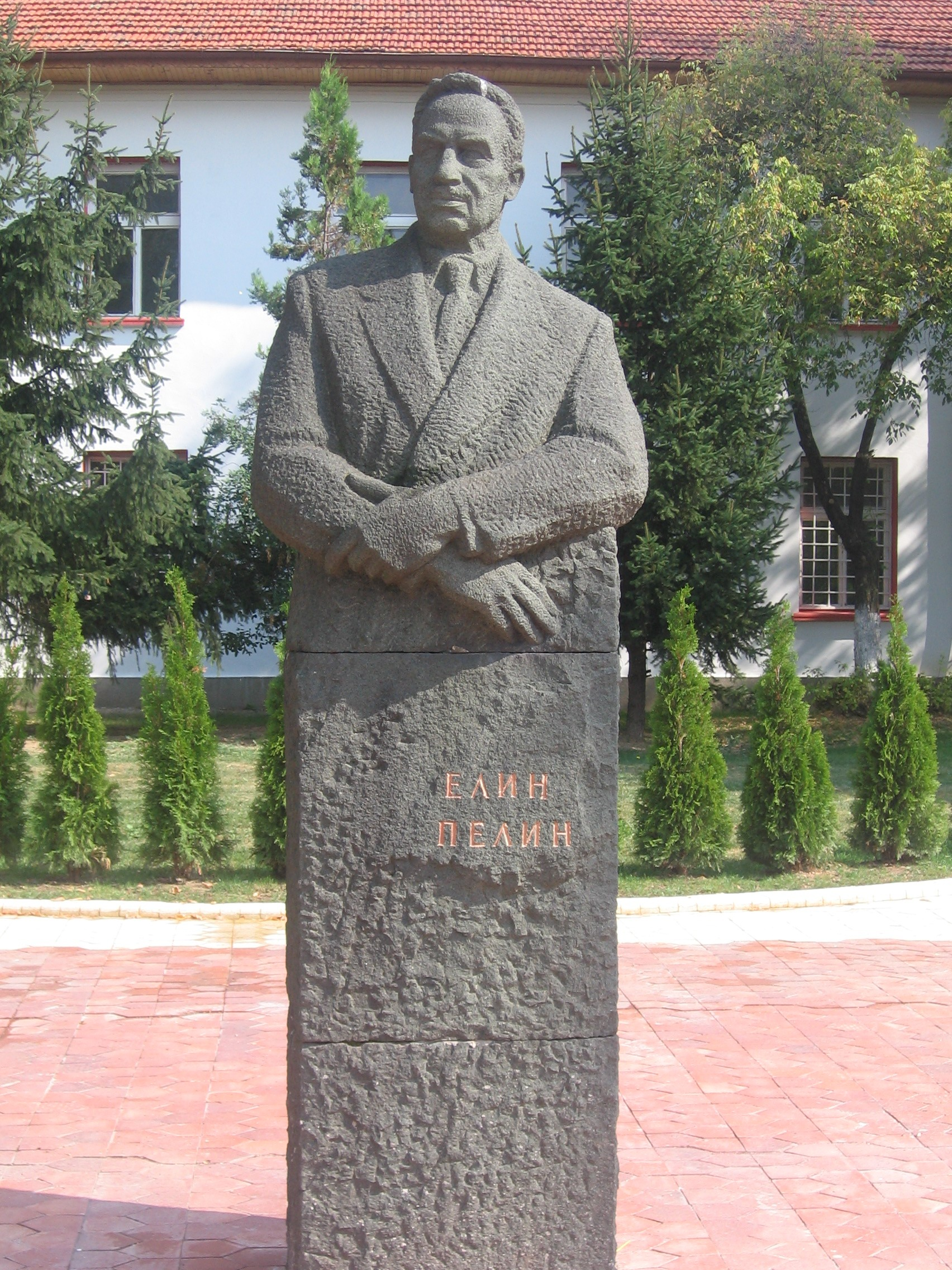
Elin Pelin (1877–1949), considered as the best Bulgarian narrator

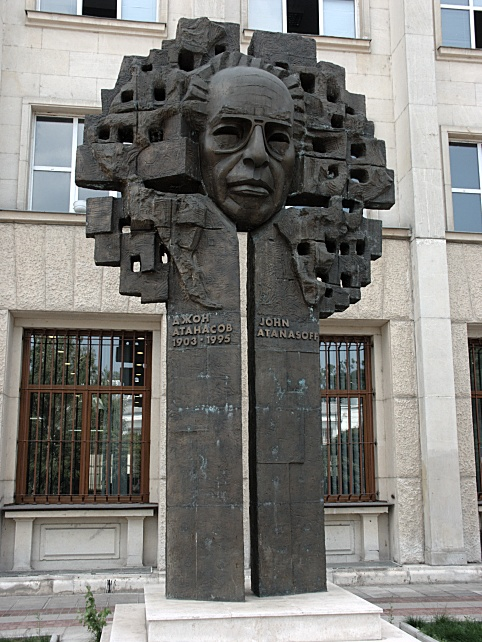
John Atanasoff (1903–1995), Bulgarian-American physicist, inventor of the computer

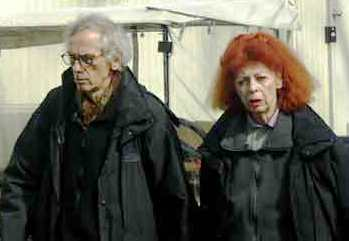
Christo (left), wrapper of the Reichstag in Berlin, the Pont-Neuf bridge in Paris, the artwork called Running Fence in Sonoma and Marin counties in California and The Gates in New York City's Central Park

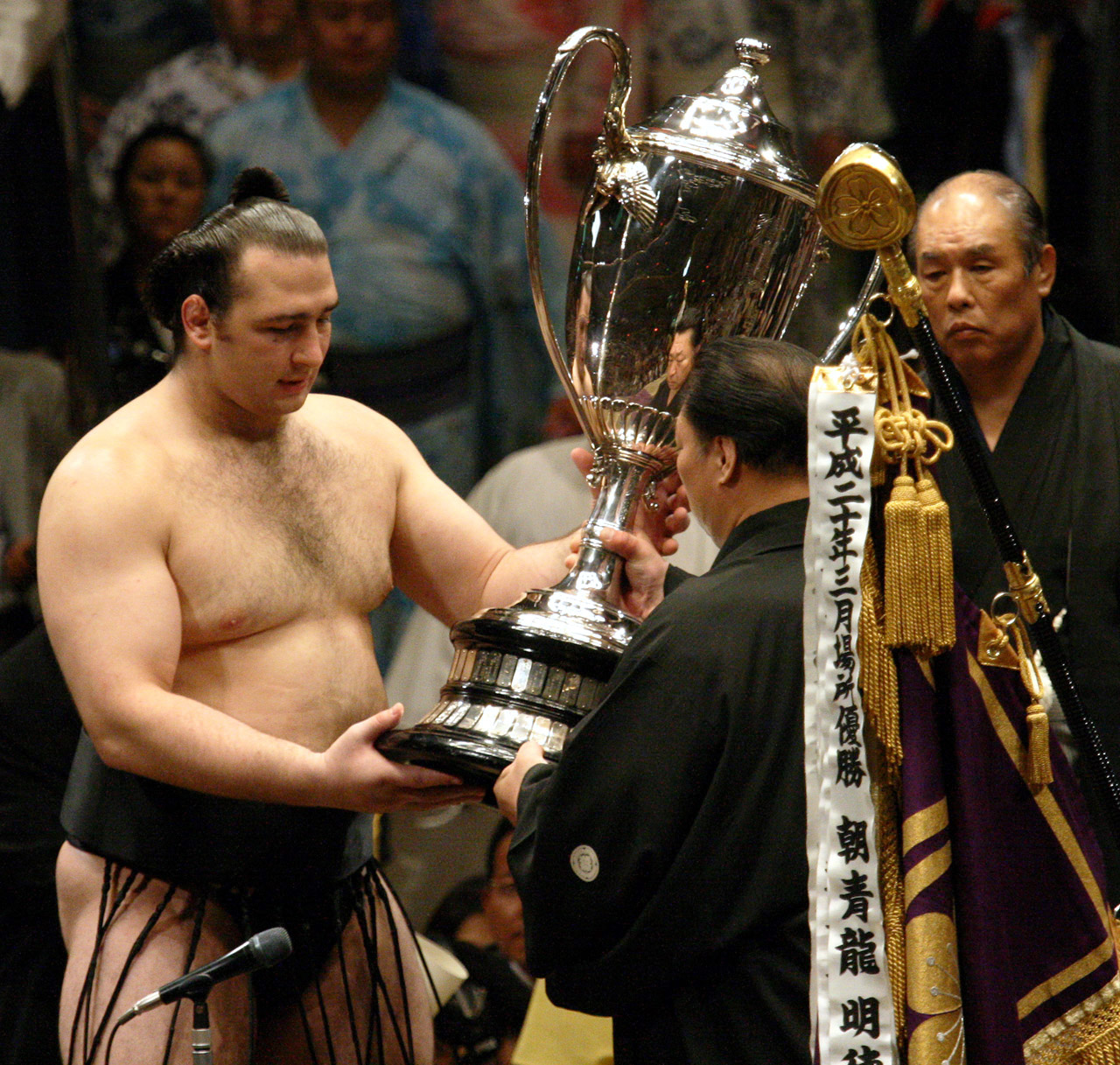
Kaloyan Mahlyanov, the only European sumo wrestler who is winner of the Emperor's Cup

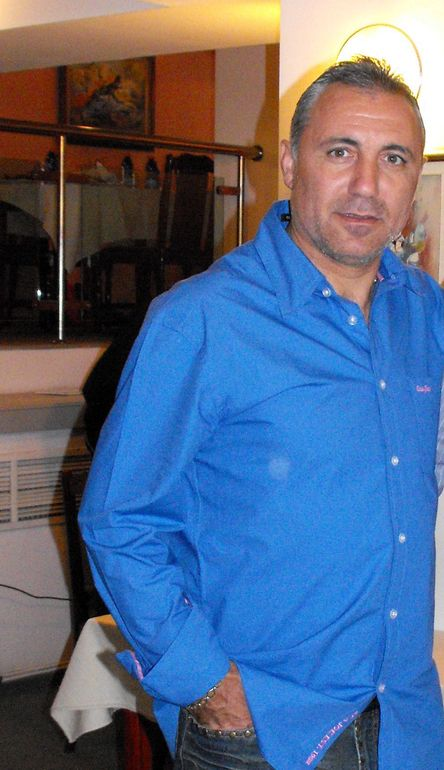
Hristo Stoichkov, football player, 1994 FIFA World Cup top scorer and winner of the Golden Shoe and the Golden Ball

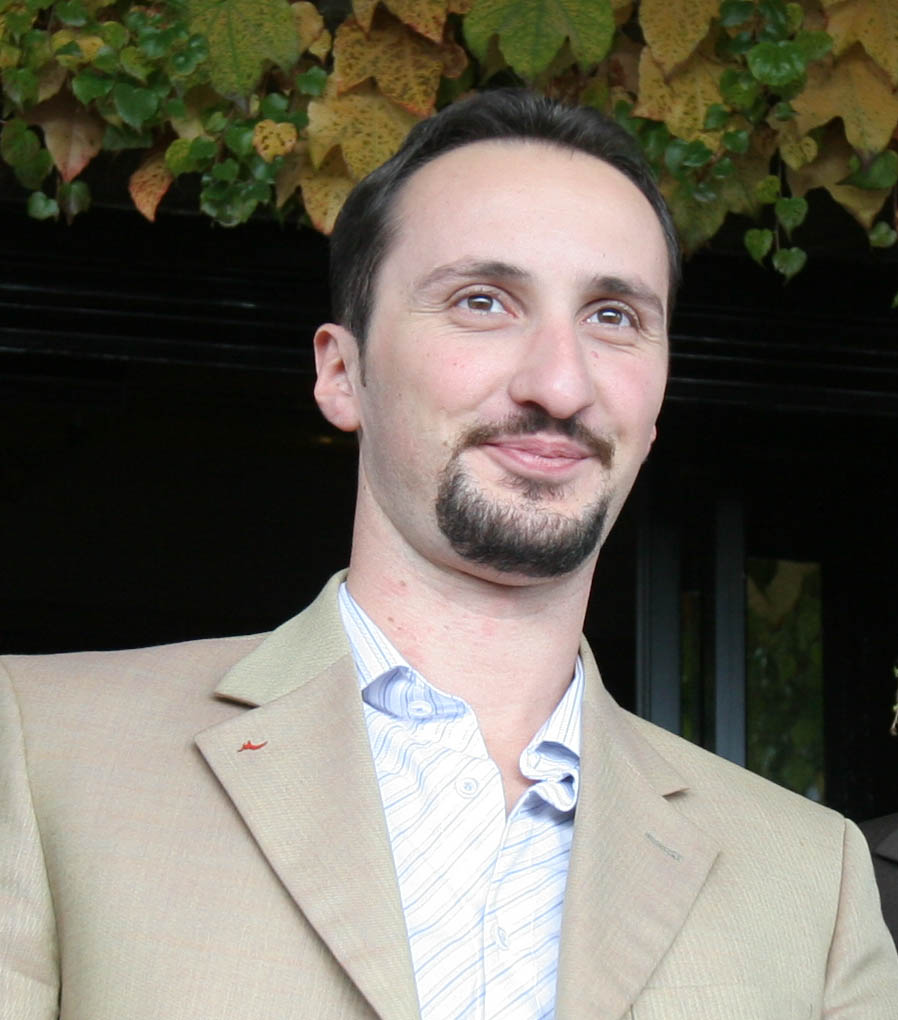
Veselin Topalov, 2005–2006 World Chess Champion

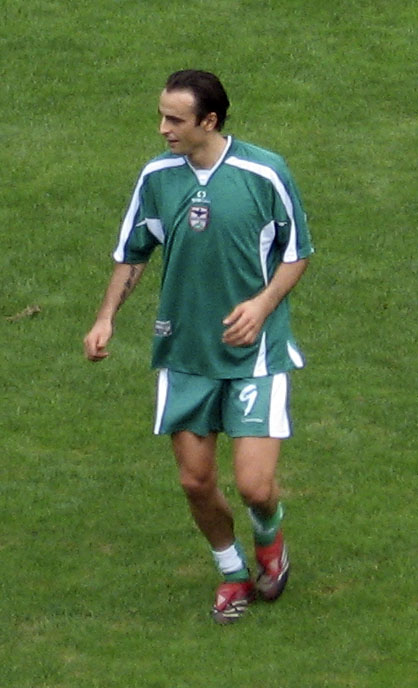
Dimitar Berbatov, football player

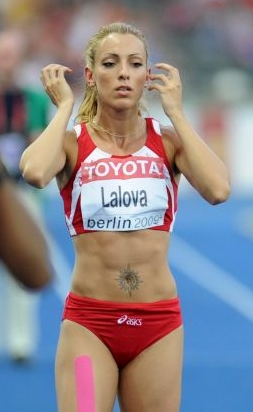
Ivet Lalova, 12th-fastest woman in the history of the 100 metres

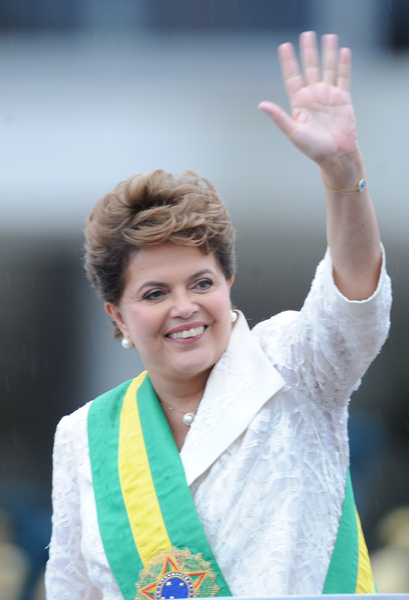
Dilma Rousseff, Bulgarian-Brazilian politician and former President of Brazil

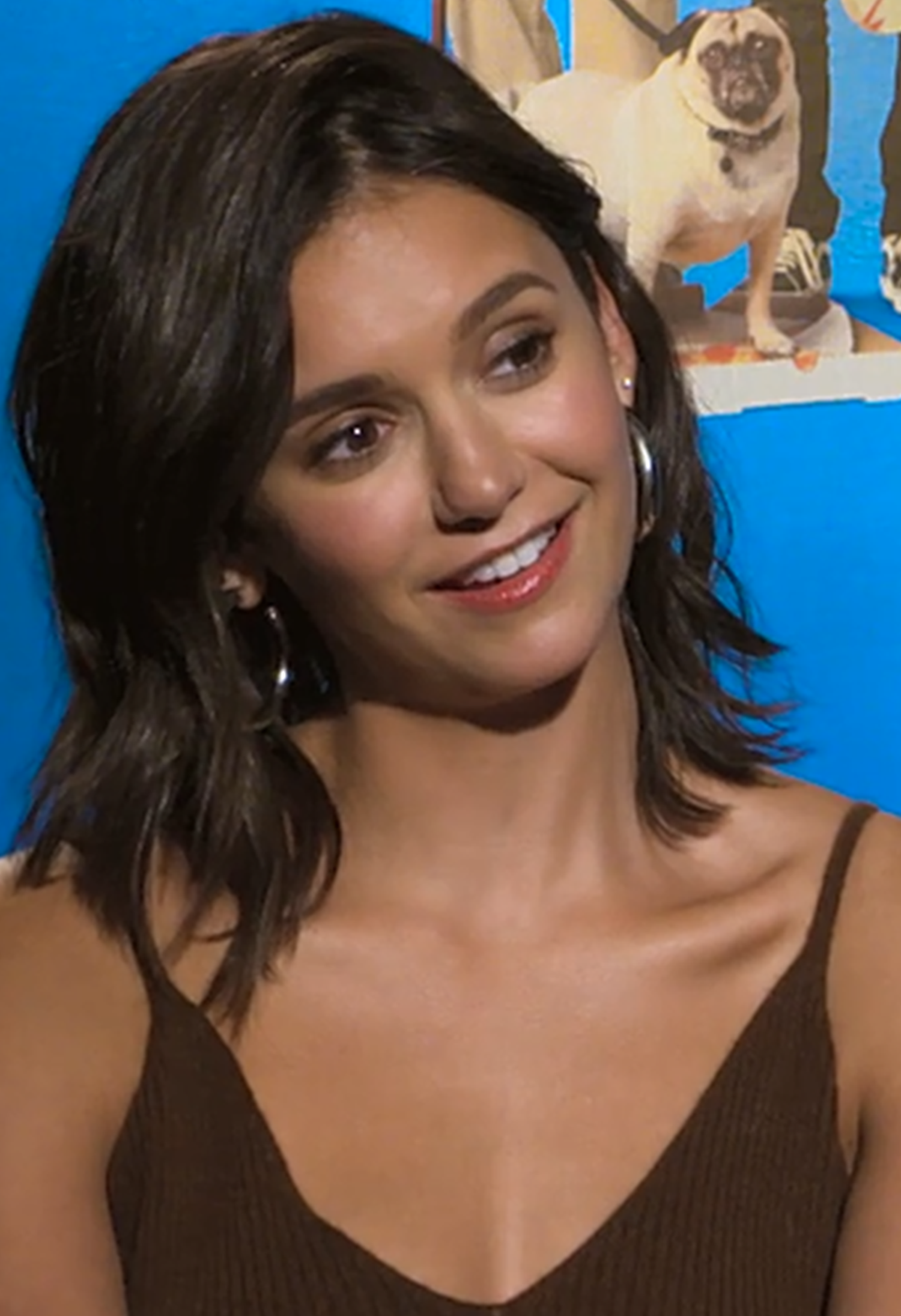
Nina Dobrev, Bulgarian-American actress

== See also ==
- Bulgaria
- Bulgarians
- Bulgarian language
