= List of Bulgarian actors =

The following is a list of Bulgarian actors.

== B ==
- Zahari Baharov
- Maria Bakalova
- Nikolay Binev
- Vasil Binev
- Radina Borshosh
- Adriana Budevska

== C ==
- Georgi Cherkelov

== D ==
- Stefan Danailov
- Mariana Dimitrova
- Tanya Dimitrova
- Ivan Dimov
- Nina Dobrev
- Moshe Dvoretzky

== F ==
- Itzhak Fintzi

== G ==
- Stoyan Gadev
- Vasil Gendov
- Georgi Georgiev-Getz
- Anton Gorchev
- Kiril Gospodinov

== I ==
- Stanislav Ianevski

== K ==
- Viktor Kalev
- Georgi Kaloyanchev
- Apostol Karamitev
- Hindo Kasimov
- Lyudmil Kirkov
- Asen Kisimov
- Konstantin Kisimov
- Nevena Kokanova
- Todor Kolev
- Victoria Koleva
- Julian Kostov
- Konstantin Kotsev
- Marius Kurkinski

== L ==
- Tatyana Lolova

== M ==
- Dimitar Manchev
- Tzvetana Maneva
- Dimiter Marinov
- Yana Marinova
- Ruslan Maynov
- Moni Moshonov
- Stoyanka Mutafova

== N ==
- Anjela Nedyalkova
- Lyubomir Neikov
- Nikolay Nikolov

== P ==
- Dimitar Panov
- Georgi Partsalev
- Katya Paskaleva
- Ideal Petrov
- Georgi Popov
- Shenka Popova

== R ==
- Dimitar Rachkov
- Krasimir Radkov
- Bashar Rahal
- Đoko Rosić
- Georgi Rusev
- Rusev

== S ==
- Hristo Shopov
- Petar Slabakov
- Jeanette Spassova
- Evstati Stratev

== T ==
- Nikola Todev

== V ==
- Grigor Vachkov
- Stefan Valdobrev
- Rangel Vulchanov

== Y ==
- Yuriy Yakovlev

== Z ==
- Ivaylo Zahariev

== See also ==
- List of actors
- List of Bulgarians
- List of Bulgarian musicians and singers
