= Boris Komitov =

Boris Komitov may refer to:

- Boris Komitov (astronomer)
- Boris Komitov (singer)
