= Yuri Stupel =

Bulgarian composer and performer

Yuri Stupel (born December 26, 1953, in Sofia, Bulgaria) is a Bulgarian composer and performer, known for his work in theater music. He has been living and working in Greece for over two decades, contributing to the cultural exchanges between Bulgaria and Greece.

== Early life and education ==
Stupel is the son of composer Petar Stupel. His mother, Lidia, is an opera singer known for her chamber performances. He began his musical journey at an early age, taking piano lessons and trying his hand at composing when he was just six years old. Stupel graduated from the Academy of Music, Dance and Fine Arts in Plovdiv, Bulgaria.

== Career ==
In the 1970s, Stupel formed the band Association with his friends Haygashot Agasyan, Kristian Boyadzhiev, and Georgi Denkov. He gained recognition as a pop music songwriter, winning awards for his compositions in the 1970s. Stupel is also known for composing scores for over 250 TV serials, theater, and puppet productions, some of which won national and international prizes.

Stupel's work in Greece includes translating and staging two plays by his friend and collaborator Stefan Tsanev, "The Last Night of Socrates" and "The True Death of Jeanne d'Arc". He has also created his own musical for children titled "The Violinist of the Sea".

Stupel has composed music for more than 350 theatrical productions. He believes in closely following the director's vision, ensuring that the music complements the overall production. His approach to composing for theater is to create a unified piece where the music does not overshadow other elements of the production.

Recently, Stupel has been involved in projects such as a one-man play dedicated to the life of ballet dancer Isadora Duncan, where he participates as a pianist. His compositions have been featured in various Greek festivals, with the Epidaurus Festival making a significant impression on him.
