= Dvoretzky =

Dvoretzky is a surname. Notable people with the surname include:

- Aryeh Dvoretzky (1916–2008), Russian-born Israeli mathematician, eighth president of the Weizmann Institute of Science
- Moshe Dvoretzky (1922–1988), Bulgarian actor

== See also ==
- Dvoretzky's theorem
