= Victoria Koleva =

Bulgarian actress

- Виктория Колева
- Born: February 20, 1960 (age 66)
- Occupation: Actress

Victoria Koleva (Bulgarian: Виктория Колева) (born 20 February 1960) is a contemporary Bulgarian actress. She has over 120 roles in theatre productions. In 2004 she was awarded an Icarus theatre award for Best Leading Actress for the role of Kostanda in Mother-in-Law by Anton Strashimirov (directed by Marius Kurkinski). Victoria Koleva won her first award in 1988 - Shumen award for Best Young Actress.

== Significant Roles ==
- Plovdiv Drama Theatre(1999–2007)
  - The Art of Comedy by L. Pirandello, directed by M. Kurkinsky … The teacher
  - The Bear by A. Chekhov, directed by M. Kurkinsky … Popova; Plovdiv Award for theatre
  - Mother-in-law by A. Strashimirov, directed by M. Kurkinsky … Kostanda
  - Romeo and Juliet by W. Shakespeare, directed by G. Stoev … Lady Capulet
  - The Brothers Karamazov by F. Dostoevsky, directed by S. Radev … Hohlakova
  - A Midsummer Night's Dream by W. Shakespeare, directed by P. Kaukov … Titania
  - Blood Wedding by Federico García Lorca, directed by M. Kurkinsky … The Mother
- European Capital of Culture, Weimar, Germany (1999)
  - Life with an Idiot by Victor Erofeyev, directed by E. Bonev … She
  - Between Worlds by Éric-Emmanuel Schmitt, directed by Zdravko Mitkov … Dr. S.
- Derezon Theatre Alliance française (1997–1998)
  - Miss Julie by A. Strindberg, directed by Emil Bonev … Miss Julia
- Plovdiv Drama Theatre(1991–1997)
  - Who's Afraid of Virginia Woolf? by E. Albee, directed by H. Zerovski … Honey
  - Sexual Perversity in Chicago by David Mamet, directed by N. Lambrev
  - The Last Yankee by Arthur Miller, directed by B. Chakrinov … Patricia
  - Vieux Carré by T. Williams, directed by A. Gadjalov … Mrs. Wier
- Shoumen Drama Theatre (1988–1991)
  - Electra, My Love by Laszlo Gyurk], directed by B. Pankin … Electra; Shoumen Award for young actress
  - The Secret Dinner of Deacon Levski by Stefan Tsanev, directed by B. Pankin … Karavelova
  - Even a Wise Man Stumbles by A. Ostrovsky, directed by A. Katz … Kleopatra Lvovna; Russia
- Razgrad Drama Theatre (1986–1988)
  - The Lark by Jean Anouilh, directed by H. Minchev … Joan of Arc
  - Love Boulevards by Stefan Tzanev, directed by Boris Pankin … Maya
- Manufacture Theatre
  - Two-Character Play by T. Williams, directed by A. Draganova … The Sister
  - Woyzeck by Georg Buchner, directed by H. Mintchev … Мariе
