= Bulgarians (disambiguation) =

Bulgarians may refer to:

- Bulgarians, a South Slavic ethnic group
- Bulgarian citizens, citizens of a country in the Southeast Europe
- Bulgarian diaspora, Bulgarians emigrants and their descendants, and also minorities of Bulgarians

== See also ==
- Lists of Bulgarians
