= Komitov =

Komitov is a Bulgarian surname. Notable people with the surname include:

- Boris Komitov (born 1952), Bulgarian pop singer, songwriter, pianist, and guitarist
- Radoslav Komitov (born 1977), Bulgarian footballer and manager
