= Chakarov =

Chakarov or Chakarova (feminine) is a Bulgarian last name derived from the Armenian name Chakar and may refer to:

- Dzhevdet Chakarov, Bulgarian Minister of Environment and Water from 2005 to 2009; see Stanishev Government
- Georgi Chakarov, a Bulgarian footballer
- Ivan Chakarov, a Bulgarian world class weightlifter
- Zhorzheta Chakarova, a Bulgarian actress; see List of Bulgarian actors
