= Cholakov =

Cholakov or Tcholakov (Bulgarian: Чолаков) is a Bulgarian masculine surname, its feminine counterpart is Cholakova or Tcholakova . It may refer to the following notable people:

- Ralitsa Tcholakova, Canadian violinist of Bulgarian origin
- Velichko Cholakov (1982–2017), Bulgarian weightlifter
