= Asen Zlatarov =

Bulgarian biochemist, writer and social activist

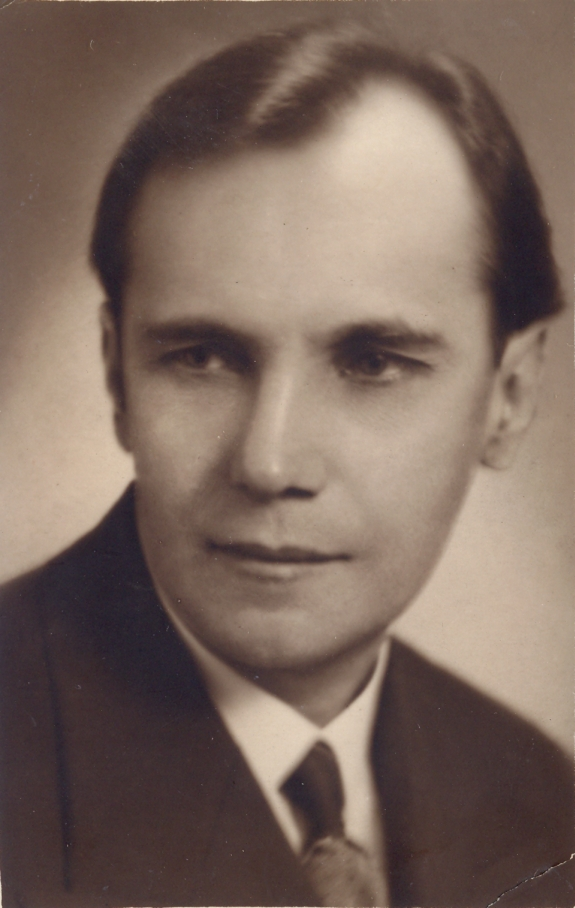
- Born: 4 February 1885; Haskovo
- Died: 22 December 1936 (aged 51)
- Occupations: writer, academic and social activist

Academic background
- Education: University of Geneva; Grenoble University

Academic work
- Discipline: biochemistry
- Institutions: Sofia University
- Main interests: soybeans
- Notable works: Die Genussmittel Bulgariens

Asen Zlatarov (Bulgarian: Асен Златаров, Assin Zlataroff) (4 February 1885 – 22 December 1936) was a Bulgarian biochemist, writer and social activist.

== Life ==
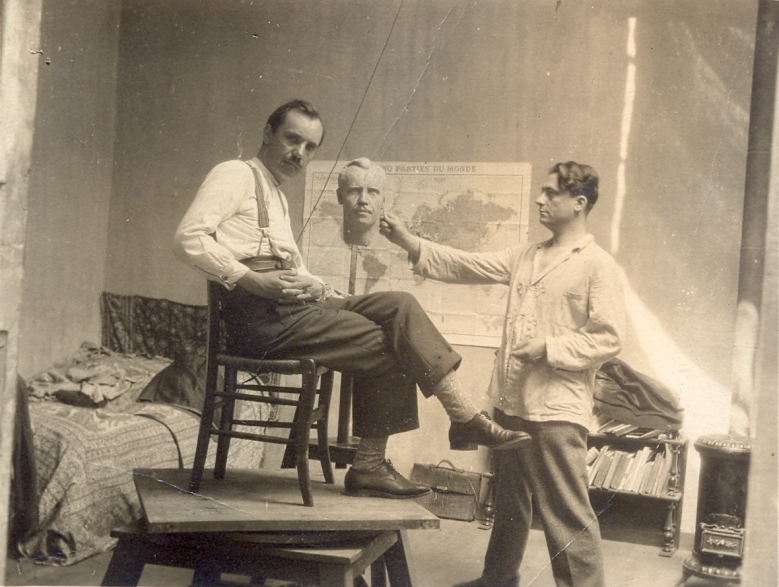
sitting for a sculpture portrayal in Paris, June 1926

He was born in Haskovo on 4 February 1885. He studied chemistry at the University of Geneva (1904–07). In 1908 he became a Ph.D. in Chemistry and Physics at Grenoble University. He taught in Plovdiv, and in Munich (1909-1910). He edited the magazines Chemistry and Industry and Nature and Science and the libraries "Naturfilosophical Reading" and "Science and Life".

From 1924, he was visiting professor, and from 1935 a regular professor at the Sofia University. He is the author of literary articles, poems, lyrical prose and a novel. In the period (1925 - 1927) he is a member of the literary circle "Sagittarius". He collaborated with the literary period in the 1930s. An active participant is in the Bulgarian People's Maritime Agreement.

Prof. Assen Zlatarov participated in the establishment of the Committee for the Protection of the Jews, together with the widow of the statesman Petko Karavelov - the public actress Ekaterina Karavelova, the writer Anton Strashimirov, Prof. Petko Staynov and others. The former Mir and Word newspapers published articles against the established committee, saying that it was not the job of Bulgaria, even more so for individual citizens, to be confused with the affairs of great Germany. On July 3, 1933, a meeting was thwarted, where lecturers were Ekaterina Karavelova and Anton Strashimirov.

== 'Prof. D-r. Assen Zlatarov' University ==
'Prof. D-r. Assen Zlatarov' University, also known as Burgas Technical University, is a public university in Burgas, Bulgaria named after Zlatarov. The University was founded on October 6, 1963 by Decree #162 of the Bulgarian Council of Ministers as a Higher Chemico-technological institute and formally named "Prof. D-r. Assen Zlatarov". As of 2007, "Prof. D-r. Assen Zlatarov" University is accredited by resolution №16 of 17.05. 2007 of the National Evaluation and Accreditation Agency and is a member of the European University Association (EUA).

== Soy research ==
Zlatarov carried out research on soybeans starting in 1918. Between 1920–1936 he published many works on soybeans.

== Selected publications ==
- Assin Zlataroff (1908). Sur quelques matières colorantes nouvelles du groupe des indulines, préparées au moyen du p-diamido-di-o-tolylméthane; 3'amino-mésobenzyl-1.2-naphtacridine et quelques dérivés. Dissertation: Th. Universit́e Grenoble.
- Assin Zlataroff (1923). Die Genussmittel Bulgariens, Sofia, Drück, "Hudojnik".
