= Asen Hadjiolov =

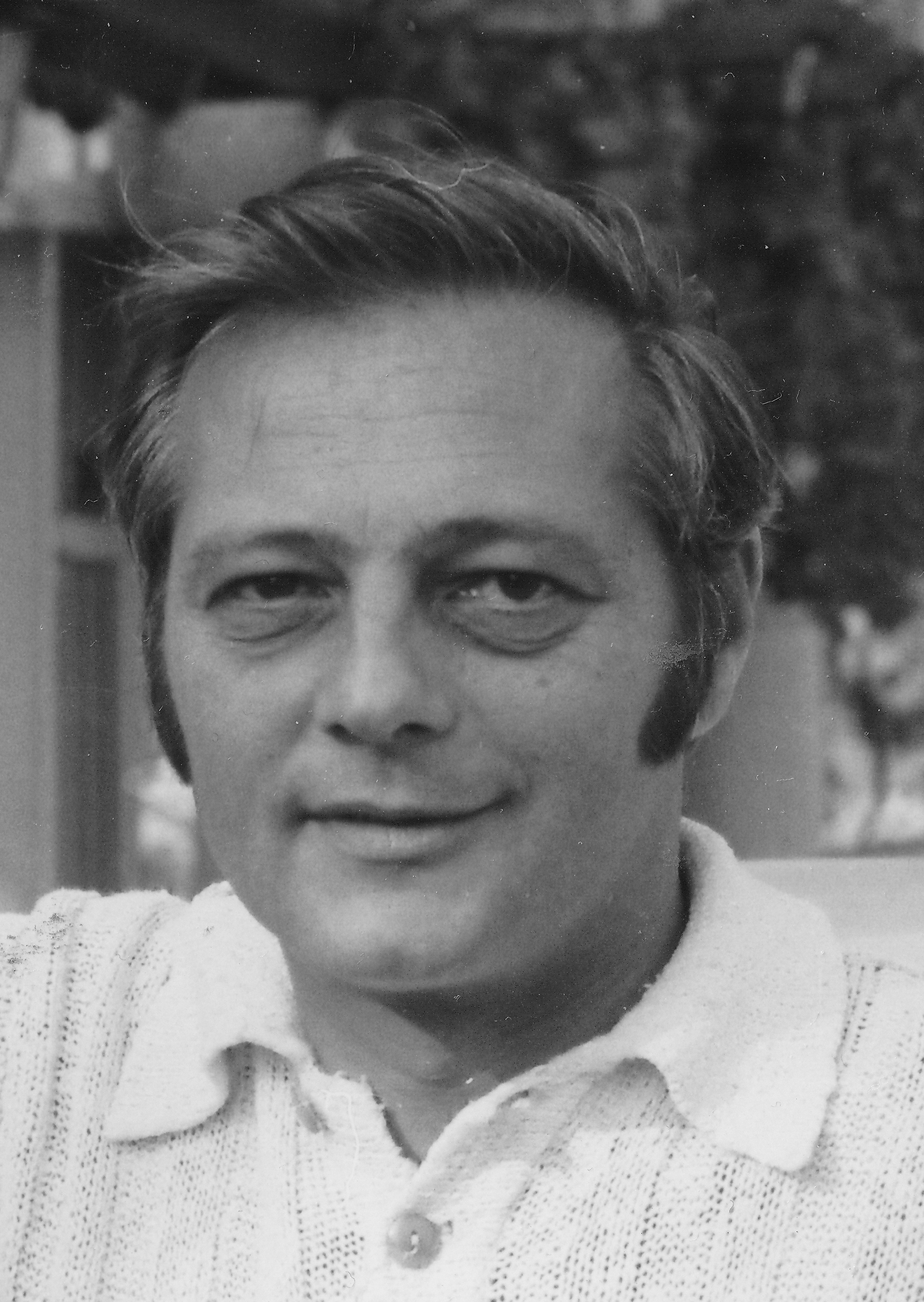
Asen A. Hadjiolov

Asen A. Hadjiolov (Bulgarian: Асен А. Хаджиолов) (December 10, 1930 – April 22, 1996) was one of the most distinguished scientists in Bulgaria, and was a member of the Bulgarian Academy of Sciences.

== Vita in brief ==
The algorithm for life - Three-dimensional structure of E. coli ribosomal RNA, showing extensive base-pairing between different regions of single stranded RNA

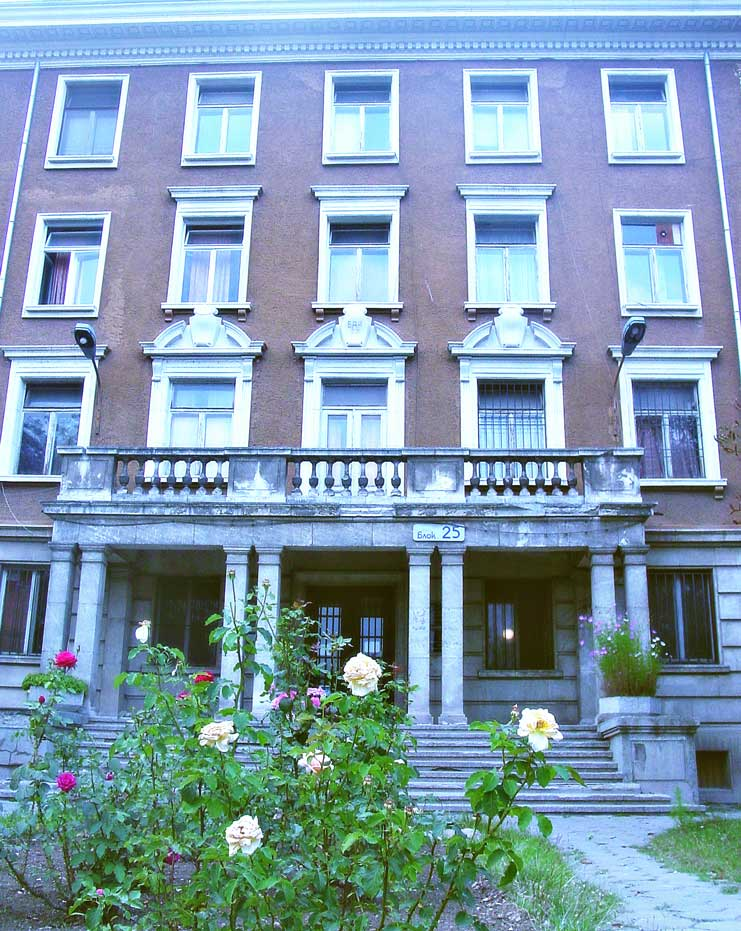
Former Institute of Cell Biology & Morphology

Hadjiolov's scholarly research on the nucleolus and ribosome biogenesis and his leadership in the scientific community touched many lives. As a young researcher he followed the path of his father: Professor Asen I. Hadjiolov was a well-known Bulgarian histologist and cytologist. Hadjiolov began experimental work in the Department of Biochemistry of the Medical Faculty of Sofia and was awarded the PhD in 1958 for his studies on the role of nucleic acids in cancer. In 1963 Hadjiolov became chair of the Department of Molecular Genetics in the Central Laboratory of Biochemistry, which was transformed into the Institute of Molecular Biology of the Bulgarian Academy of Sciences in 1969. During his early years, Hadjiolov had the chance to work with such eminent scientists as F.B. Straub (Budapest), R Grabar (Paris), the Nobel Prize winner Fritz Lipmann (Cold Spring Harbor, New York) and later with R. Cox (London) and D. Sabatini (New York). Early on, he became fascinated by the structure and biosynthesis of ribosomal RNA (rRNA) and the biogenesis of eukaryotic ribosomes.

== Mechanisms of regulation of rRNA synthesis ==
One of Hadjiolov's lab where rRNA was sequenced

Hadjiolov's laboratory was the first to provide reliable evidence that the change in the rate of rRNA synthesis in higher eukaryotes is not accompanied by alterations in the number of active genes. During his active research years Hadjiolov published more than hundred of articles focused on the ribosome (see PubMed for a complete list). Hadjiolov's list of publications totals 106 listed in PubMed. Hadjiolov's contribution to the world's science can also be measured by contribution of the scientists he recruited and supported throughout his career. All together the heritage of his group exceeds 1,000 articles annotated by PubMed, which matches today's highest quantitative achievements in science. For example, the most cited author since 1994 by the Institute for Scientific Information's Citation Report, Dr. John C. Reed (Burnham Institute for Medical Research) and his group have reached similar number of articles (PubMed:728 as of April 4, 2007).

== Science Heritage ==
Hadjiolov's group (not limited to this list, cumulative PubMed count > 860 articles):

♦ Krasimira V. Hadjiolova, PhD (23) NYU Langone Medical Center (New York)
♦ Nikolai Nikolaev, PhD (111) (1943 - 2004)
♦ Kalin P. Dudov, PhD, (15) Inst. of Genetic Engineering, Bulgaria
♦ Pencho Venkov, PhD (64) Sofia University
♦ Mariana D. Dabeva, PhD, (57) Albert Einstein College of Medicine
♦ Violetta Iotsova, PhD, (11) Bristol-Myers Squibb Pharmaceutical Research Institute
♦ Raina N. Ikonomova PhD, (4) not active in research
♦ Svetlana I. Gramatikova, PhD, (9) Burnham Institute for Medical Research
♦ Georgi Milchev, PhD, (13) Inst. of Mol. Biol., Bulgarian Academy of Sciences
♦ Ivan I. Todorov, (221) PhD, City of Hope National Medical Center
♦ Milko M. Kermekchiev, PhD (12) Washington University in St. Louis
♦ Radka Philipova, PhD, (14) Newcastle University
♦ Nikolai Zhelev, PhD, (28) University of Abertay Dundee
♦ Krasimir Y. Yankulov, PhD (19) University of Toronto
♦ Alex P. Vassilev, PhD, (105) University of Aarhus
♦ Luchezar K. Karagyozov, PhD, (15) Friedrich Schiller University of Jena
♦ Iveta D. Kalcheva, PhD (14) UCSD Cancer Center UCSD Medical Center
♦ Irina Stancheva, PhD, (22) University of Edinburgh
♦ Oleg I. Georgiev, PhD, (99) Institut für Molekularbiologie, Universität Zürich
♦ Peter Milev, MD, PhD, (17) University of Iowa
♦ Kosi Gramatikoff, PhD, (9) Burnham Institute for Medical Research

== See also ==
- List of Bulgarians
