= Evgeny Vatev =

Bulgarian Scientist (Multiple Fields)

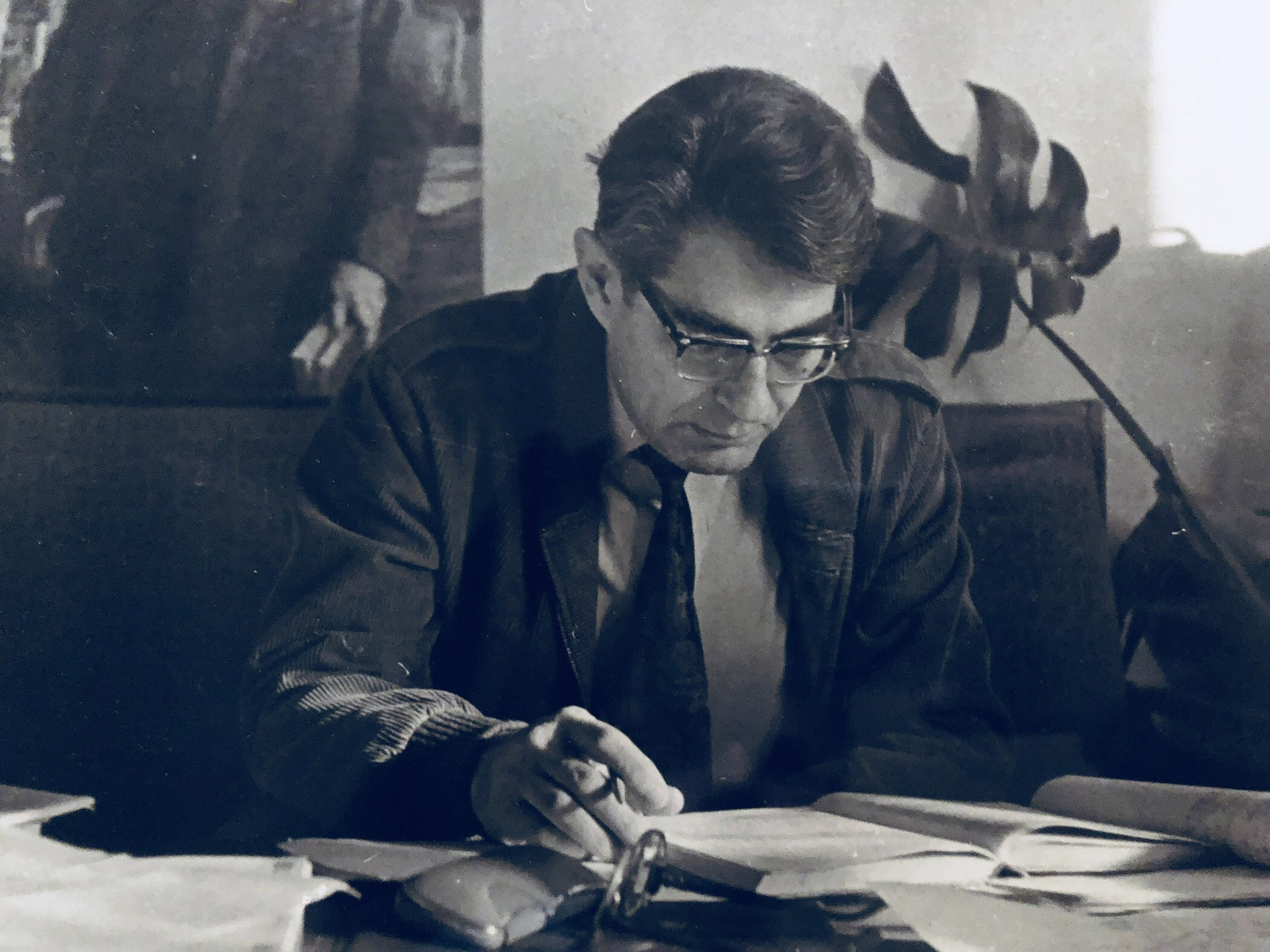
Evgeny Vatev

Evgeny Vatev (also known as “Dr. Vatev of Bulgaria”, Prof. Evgenij Vatev, Prof. Dsc Evgeni Vatev Vatev, Bulgarian: Евгений Вътев Вътев, March 18, 1928 – March 3, 2015) was a Bulgarian scientist specializing in the fields of quantum physics, materials science, mechanical engineering, technology of metals, and a public figure with achievements for the state's higher education, cultural advancement, foreign relations and trade, government, the adoption of laws and the international recognition of the state's private, higher education institutions, and a scientific ambassador of Bulgaria.

== Early life and career ==
Born on March 18, 1928, in the family of a naval engineer, co-owner of the Bulgarian shipbuilding yards and factories Koralovag and Cherno More - Vasil (Vatio) Vatev ( Вътю Вътев) and a teacher - Irina Vateva, in the city of Varna, Bulgaria, Evgeny Vatev graduated Machine Engineering with honors at the State Polytechnics in Sofia (1954)

His career started as a research and development director at Varna's shipbuilding yards. From 1958 to 1964 he was a research associate at the newly established Machine Building Research Institute in Sofia and part-time assistant teacher at the State Polytechnics.

In 1964 he joined the team developing the Higher Institute of Machine and Electrical Engineering in Varna, now Technical University of Varna. There he created and managed the chair of Physical Metallurgy and Technology of Metals and was actively involved in the general development of the institute, taking the posts of Deputy Dean (three times re-elected) and a founder and director of the Research Department at the institute. In 1965 he was elected as an associate professor and in 1975 he was granted a full professor position. In 1972 Vatev defended a Doctor of Science dissertation in Berlin, Germany named "Internal tensions during induction hardening" receiving the magna cum laude distinction.

This highly intensive introduction of the research results is supported by the organized Problem Solution Laboratory at the Physical Metallurgy and Technology of Metals Chair at the Technical University of Varna, later converted into Technology Center.

In the course of almost 10 years, Vatev was the executive director and in cooperation with Ivan Bakardzhiev led the Varna branch of the Institute for Physical Metallurgy and Technology of Metals at the Bulgarian Academy of Sciences (BAN). The latter is also involved in projects related to the counter pressure casting method of the Academician Angel Balevski.

In 1991 he became the founder of Science and Business Association, which at that time created and managed Varna Free University's "Chernorizets Hrabar"

In 1993 Vatev was elected rector of the university and leads the battles for its recognition as a private university by the Bulgarian Parliament, managing and raising its reputation.

During his time at Varna Free University, Vatev had 7 publications on issues of the electric arch build-up welding of details for construction machines and research of steel and cast iron, compiles a Guide on interchange of metals and electrodes, works on the project "Inductive restructuring of guide rails for large scale lathes", the results of which are later introduced with high economic effect at the Large Scale Machinery Plant – Pernik.

Since he joined Varna Free University in 1993 until 2003 he was a dean of the Faculty of Marine and Construction Sciences, where he organized and managed the first classic specialties of Building Construction and Architecture, the first at the time taught outside Sofia. A number of managerial positions followed – dean of the Faculty of Marine and Construction Sciences, where Vatev laid the foundations of the Faculty of Architecture and of the major "Construction of Buildings and Facilities"; dean of the educational and research complex "Technics and Technologies", "Architecture and Construction", scientific secretary, advisor to the rector.

== Scientific and applied work ==
Vatev was one of the pioneers of the research work in the field of physical metallurgy, thermal treatment of metals and welding. The main focuses of his research work were: research of the phase transformations, the structure, the properties and the internal tensions in the surface layers of the hardened through fast induction and flame treatment iron-carbon alloys; surface gas chemical-thermal saturation with carbon and nitrogen (gas carbonitronization); research of electrodes for welding and build-up welding. The research production of Vatev dates since 1956. It exceeds 160 items and includes publications in leading local and international magazines, printed reports from international congresses and symposiums in Germany, Russia, Poland, Austria, Hungary, Italy, Belgium, France as well as on locally held international conferences. He represented the Bulgaria at major international scientific events and symposiums. He has authored three books, two manuals and number of teaching and methodological materials. He also possessed 10 patent certificates.

Vatev's scientific research activities resulted in organization and management of the development of machines, construction and technology implemented with substantial economic success at the following factories and plants:

- machines and technologies for flame hardening of various machine details – crankshafts and camshafts, guide rails for metal cutting machines, gears, brake disks, etc. – at the machine plants "V. Kolarov" Varna, "Struma" – Pernik, "N.Y.Vaptsarov" – Pleven, Metal Cutting Machines Plants in Troyan, Sliven, Vratsa, Pazardzhik.
- Technologies and inductors, including with ferric magnetic cores, for inductive hardening for the Large Scale Machinery Plant – Pernik, "V. Kolarov" Machinery Plant in Varna, Military Plant No12 in Banya;
- Installations and technologies for gas carbonitronization of hydraulic and machine details, instruments and other stuff for the "Hydraulics" Plant in Kazanlak, "Orgtechnica" Plant in Silistra, Geologic Machinery Repair Factory – Balchik, "Bl. Popov" Plant – Pernik, etc.

== Teaching and academic work ==
The 50-year long teaching career of Vatev begins in 1958 as part-time teaching assistant at the State Polytechnics in Sofia. With the establishment of the Higher Institute of Machine and Electrical Engineering in Varna in 1963, he organized the training process, the laboratory setup on physical metallurgy and machine technology and the practical training of the students.

He lectured on mechanical technologies, physical metallurgy, thermal treatment, supervised more than 40 diploma students and 7 successful D.Sc. students.

Vatev is a founder of the lecturing courses on "Industrial technologies" as part of the "Industrial management" specialty and "Construction machines" and "Construction materials" for the specialties "Buildings' construction" and "Architecture" and also developed the necessary laboratory setup for these. Since 2006/2007 he was a part-time lecturer on "Materials and technologies" for "Interior design" specialty.

== Public service ==
- A long-term member of the boards of the National Section on physical metallurgy and thermal treatment at the Scientific and Technical Union and of the management of the Union of the Scientific Workers – Varna.
- One of the founders and representatives of Bulgaria at the International Union for Thermal Treatment and also participant in the organization with numerous scientific and technical events.
- Participated in the preparation of the national programs and the programs of the Union for Economic Cooperation for the development of Material Technologies.
- He was appointed by UNESCO.
- Prof. Vatev was an active participant in the system for assessment of the scientific staff:
  - He is an author of numerous reviews of dissertations and habilitation works.
  - He was a member of 3 specialized scientific assessment committees and was elected 4 times at the Supreme Assessment Commission.
- Professor Evgeny Vatev was also a former VP of the Municipality Council of Varna.

== Distinctions and awards ==
- "Cyril and Methodius" Bulgarian State Medal – Gold
- 1-st degree Bulgarian State Award – Gold
- Distinctive Worker of Technology – Bulgarian State Medal – Gold
- Distinctive degree by the German State for joined scientific and research work
- Second degree award on the National competition for automation from the State Committee for Science and Technology
- Honorary diplomas and medals from some of the world's more prestigious institutions

Specifically for his work on VFU "Chernorisetz Hrabar":

- Was awarded by the mayor of Varna for the setup of "Architecture and Construction" faculty at the university; VARNA Award.
- Golden ring with honorary diplomas for high achievements as leader, scientist, lecturer and public activist with exceptional contribution for the establishment, development and raising the reputation of VFU "Chernorisetz Hrabar" University.
