= Georgi Georgiev-Gogo =

Bulgarian actor (born 1971)

- Born: November 5, 1971 (age 55); Sofia, Bulgaria
- Occupation: Actor
- Years active: 1981–present

Georgi Georgiev Georgiev-Gogo (Bulgarian: Георги Георгиев Георгиев – Гого; born November 5, 1971) is a Bulgarian actor. He is best known for his voice-over roles in famous television series like JAG, Ally McBeal, That '70s Show, Farscape, Sliders, Dharma & Greg and CSI: NY.

== Acting career ==
He had a small role in the movie Orkestar bez ime and appeared in the television series She and he. He has also appeared in commercials for M-Tel and Multirama.

== Voice acting career ==
Gogo started his voice-over career in the late 1990s. His first series was Early Edition for Nova Television. Other series he has dubbed into Bulgarian include Highlander: The Series (second dub), Two Guys and a Girl, Law & Order: Criminal Intent, Studio 60 on the Sunset Strip and Heroes (from season three onwards) as well as animated series like Justice League and Duck Dodgers.

== Personal life ==
He is married and has two sons. His mother is Keva Apostolova, the chief editor of Theatre magazine and his father is actor Georgi G. Georgiev.
