= Venelin Tsachevsky =

Bulgarian scholar, economist, historian, political researcher and diplomat

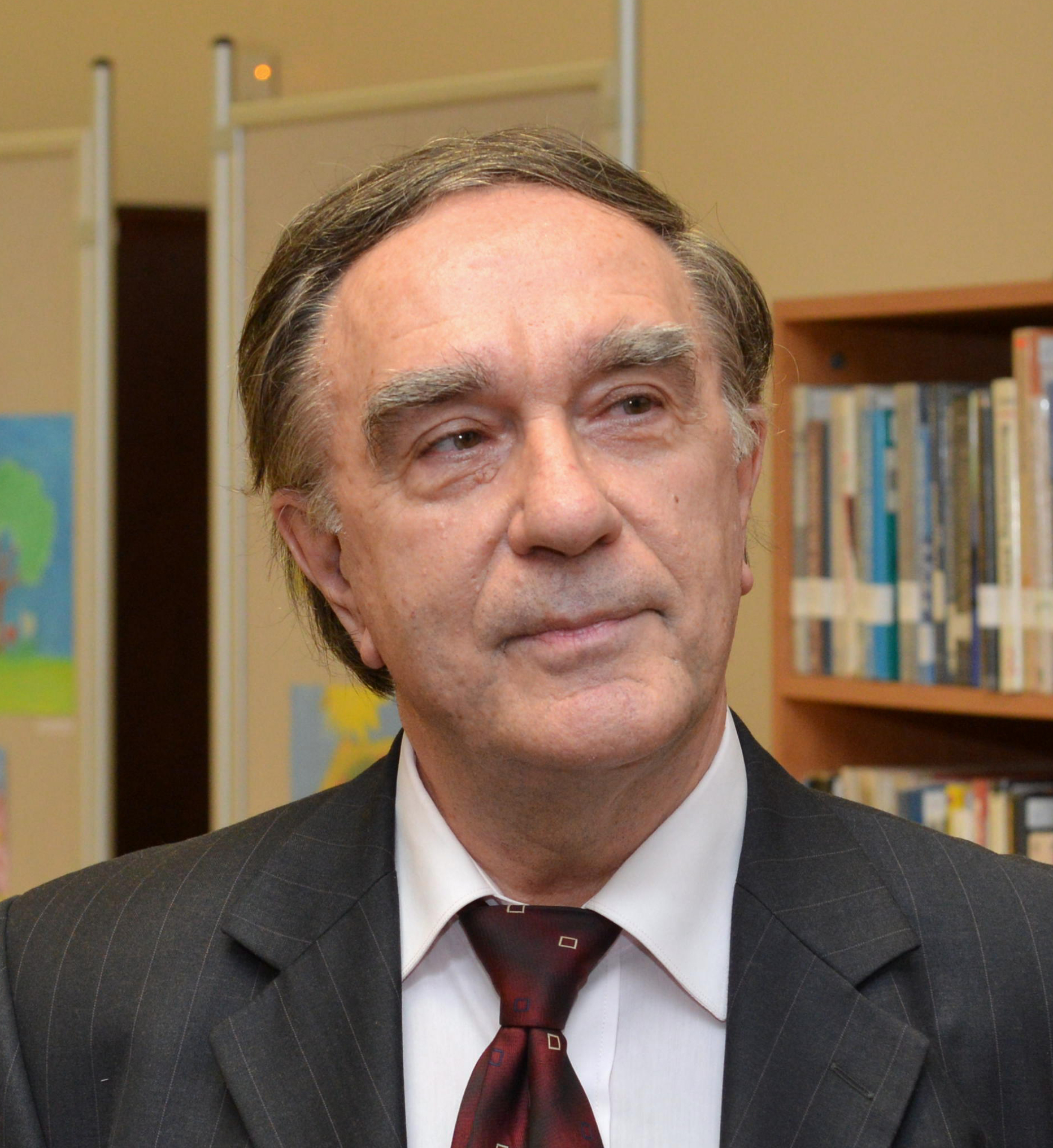
- Born: September 1948 (age 77); Sofia, Bulgaria
- Occupations: Scholar and diplomat

Venelin Tsachevsky (Bulgarian: Венелин Цачевски) is a Bulgarian scholar, economist, historian, political researcher and diplomat.

== Biography ==
Venelin Tsachevsky was born in 1948 in Sofia. He got his master's degree in economics from the Karl Marx Higher Institute of Economics in Sofia (presently the University of National and World Economy). He worked at the Ivan Bashev Institute for Foreign Policy Studies, which was part of the Ministry of Foreign Affairs, the Institute for International Relations and Socialist Integration to the Presidium of the Bulgarian Academy of Sciences, the International Relations Institute, etc.

V. Tsachevsky holds a Ph.D. in economics (1975) and D.Sc. in economic studies (1990). He was professor at the Slavic University, Veliko Tarnovo University and New Bulgarian University, teaching theory of foreign policy and Bulgarian foreign policy. He was Head of the International Law and International Relations Department at the New Bulgarian University and Veliko Tarnovo University. He was a guest professor at the Helsinki University lecturing in the history and international relations of the Balkans and Bulgarian foreign policy. He completed specializations in Belgium, Finland, Switzerland, Japan, Germany, Russia, et al.

V. Tsachevsky was a counsellor at Bulgaria’s Ministry of Foreign Affairs. In 2003-2006 he was appointed Ambassador Extraordinary and Plenipotentiary of Bulgaria to Finland, and in 2004-2006 he was assigned the same duties for Estonia.

He is the author of multiple publications in the field of history, Bulgaria’s foreign policy, the Balkans, the small states in Europe, the EU integration, etc. Some of his books, studies and articles were published in Japan, Finland, Switzerland and other countries. Among them are: The Bulgarian Communism (1993); The Balkans. New South-East Europe (first edition in 2007, second edition in 2008); The Balkans. The European Choice (2008); The Balkans. The End of Conflicts (2008); The Balkans. The Tough Road to United Europe (2008); Behind the Façade of Bulgarian Diplomacy (2008); The Balkans and Bulgaria. The Europeanization is Not Over (first edition in 2010, second edition in 2011); Bulgaria and the Balkans at the Beginning of the 21st Century (2012); Energy Management in South-East Europe: Achievements and Prospects (2013); The Swiss Model. The Power of Democracy (2013); Casimir Ehrnrooth in Bulgaria’s History. Military Commander and Statesman (2013); Casimir Ehrnrooth. The General Who Made History (2013); The Swiss Model - The Power of Democracy (2014); Casimir Ehrnrooth. The Finn Who Made History (2014); Switzerland. Democracy of the Future (2014); “Bulgaria and Switzerland. Together in History” (2015), etc.

V. Tsachevsky has donated copies of his books to Sofia City Council, the University of National and World Economy, the Sofia Central Library, the City Library and Bulgaria-Switzerland Friendship Society “Louis Eyer” in the town of Lom, Finnish administrative and cultural institutions, foreign embassies. Following his proposals the Sofia Municipal Council has named streets in Sofia after Gen. Casimir Ehrnrooth and Prof. Konstantin Katzarov. He has initiated the placement of commemorative symbols honouring Gen. Casimir Ehrnrooth in Finland, Sofia and the town of Targovishte, as well as the renovation of the monument in the V.N. Lavrov Park, near the city of Pleven, dedicated to the Finnish soldiers who died in the Gorni Dabnik battle during the Russo-Turkish War of 1877-1878.
