= Angel Penchev =

Angel Penchev (Bulgarian: Ангел Пенчев) is a Bulgarian psycho-neurologist and morphologist, director of the mental-psychiatric clinic at the Sofia Faculty of Medicine. He fled Bulgaria after the Soviet Union invaded in 1944.
