= Asen Kozharov =

Bulgarian philosopher, politician, and yogi

Asen Todorov Kojarov (born 19 July 1911 in Nevrokop, Salonica Vilayet, Ottoman Empire, now Bulgaria, died 19 November 1988 in Sofia) was a Bulgarian philosopher, politician, and yogi. He was a member of the Internal Macedonian Revolutionary Organization (United) and the Bulgarian Communist Party.

== Biography ==
He was born in 1911 as Asen Charakchiev in the town of Nevrokop, in the Salonica Vilayet of the Ottoman Empire, now the town of Gotse Delchev, Bulgaria. In 1935 as a student of philosophy he was expelled from University of Sofia for communist activities and was sentenced to 12 1/2 years of imprisonment. In the prison, he illegally studied the classicists of Marxism-Leninism and guided circles in philosophy. Freed in 1940, he again joined the illegal communist movement. On 24 January 1943 he married Liliana Milosheva. In March 1944 he was imprisoned for a second time.

Under communist regime after WWII, Asen Kozharov worked as a functionary of the Bulgarian Communist Party in the state apparatus and as a journalist. In 1948 he graduated from the Faculty of Philosophy of the University of Sofia as a correspondent student. In 1949-1951 he was lecturer in philosophy at the Polytechnical School in Sofia. From 1952 to 1972, with a short interruption, he was scientific secretary and deputy editor in chief of the Filosofska Misal magazine. In 1957 he went to specialize in Moscow. From 1960 to 1962 he was director of Bulgarian Encyclopaedia, Bulgarian Academy of Sciences. In 1962 he was elected as senior research associate in philosophy. From 1963 to 1966 he was Bulgarian representative at the International magazine Problems of Peace and Socialism in Prague, Czechoslovakia. From 1966 to 1969 he was a deputy director Of the Bulgarian History Institute. Also from 1966 to 1981 he was deputy director of the Institute for Modern Social Theories. In 1968 he changed his family name from Charakchiev (Turkish version) into Kozharov (Bulgarian translation). In 1973 he became doctor of philosophical sciences, in 1977 - professor of philosophy. In 1971 he was awarded with a medal People's Republic of Bulgaria, 1 grade, in 1981 - with a medal Georgi Dimitrov.
