= Angel Balevski =

Angel Tonchev Balevski (Bulgarian: Ангел Балевски) (4 March 1910 – 15 September 1997) was a Bulgarian engineer, inventor, and politician. He has been a member of the State Council of the People's Republic of Bulgaria for the whole duration of its existence (1971-1989). Balevski was president of the Bulgarian Academy of Sciences (1968-1988), Co-president of the International Academy of Science, Munich (1988-1997) and chairman of the Bulgarian Pugwash Group.

== Life ==
He graduated from a technical school in Brno in the Czech Republic in 1934 and started his professional career as a metallurgical engineer. Later he was a professor at numerous universities across Europe. Balevski was the founder of the Bulgarian academic school in the field of metal sciences and technologies. He was successful in designing a hot pressing machine for non-ferrous metals. He developed an original method for cast iron production from Bulgarian raw materials in a rotating drum furnace. Together with Ivan Dimov, he developed a counter-pressure casting method which was a novelty in world foundry technology and was protected by over 100 patent documents in Bulgaria and abroad. He was the author or co-author of more than seven monographs and academic textbooks.

== Awards ==
Balevski was elected honorary and foreign member of the academies and research societies in many countries. He was the Co-president of the International Academy of Science, Munich (1988) and a member of the Board of the Pugwash Movement of Scientists for Peace (1971).

He was presented with the highest Bulgarian and foreign awards for his contribution to science and inventions, including two Dimitrov Prizes, the French Palmes académiques, the Lomonosov Gold Medal of the Russian Academy of Sciences and others. He was also awarded the honorary title of People's Scientist. He was Doctor h.c. of the Technical University, Sofia.

== See also ==
- Bulgarian Academy of Science
- International Academy of Science (History)
