= Silvia Dimitrova =

Bulgarian icon painter

- Born: Silvia Dimitrova Rea
- Occupation: Painter
- Years active: 1989–present
- Website: silviadimitrova.co.uk

Silvia Dimitrova (Bulgarian: Силвия Димитрова) is a Bulgarian icon painter. She won a place at the School of Applied Arts at Troyan at the age of 13. She graduated in 1989. She then studied icon painting in Sofia under the tuition of Georgi Tchouchev, a master iconographer in Sofia.

She held a solo exhibition in Paris, in the Cultural Centre Edmond Rostand, Rueil-Malmaison in 1997. In the spring of 1999 she was commissioned by Downside Abbey to paint the Icon of St Benedict, Wells. At the beginning of 2000 Silvia worked as an artist-in-residence at Wells Cathedral with a commission to paint the Fourteen Stations of the Cross as a project for the Millennium. In the same year she was married, in Wells Cathedral, to Simon Potter, a house master at Downside School, Somerset.

She works in the traditional technique of icon painting - egg tempera on wood.
