= Kiril Lambov =

Kiril Minkov Lambov (born July 4, 1955, died in October in Sofia 2019) in Lyaskovets) is a composer, pianist, and conductor.

Lambov graduated from the State Academy of music in 1980 majoring in Piano under Professor Dora Lazarova and Composition under Professor Alexander Tanev. Later he also graduated from the Academy of Music and Dance Art in Plovdiv majoring in Conducting under Professor Emil Yanev(1995).

He taught at the music high school in Stara Zagora from 1980 to 1983. He also taught Harmony at the State Academy of Music (1991) and Piano at the university in Veliko Tarnovo (1994) He was appointed accompanist at Sofia University (1999 - 2000) and the Ballet School(1999 - 2001), expert at the ministry of Culture. He worked as guest conductor with Bulgarian symphony and chamber orchestras premiering Bulgarian works.

He authored over 1,000 arrangements and over 80 works including an opera and a one-act ballet, works for symphony orchestra, chamber instrumental pieces, and songs for soprano and piano. His works were performed in France, Germany, Greece, the Netherlands, Russia, the US, Ecuador, and Japan. Part of his music was released on CD and printed in Bulgaria and Japan. He was prizewinner at the First Young performers and Composers Festival in Quito, Ecuador.

== Selected works ==
=== Stage music ===
1. Ballet: Nunka, one — act ballet (1999)
2. Opera: Reinard the Fox, libretto by Veronique Steeno(2001)

=== For symphony orchestra ===
1. Symphonic poem(1986)
2. Symphony # 2 Arabic(2000)
3. Concertos for: -
  oboe and orchestra(1994)
  piano and orchestra (1998)
4. Concert piece for two violins (2002)

=== For string orchestra ===
1. Symphony # 1 Chamber (1989)
2. Concert piece for cymbal and string orchestra (1993)

=== Chamber music ===
1. South Quartet for flute, clarinet, piano and percussion (1990)
2. Sonata for oboe and piano (1984)
3. Tune and Improvisation for viola and piano (1990)
4. Concert piece for trumpet and piano (1994)

=== For Piano ===
1. Poem (1984)
2. Sonata (1987)
3. Three Studies
