= Ideal Petrov =

Bulgarian film actor (1899 - 1983)

Ideal Petrov (Bulgarian: Идеал Петров; 1899–1983) was a Bulgarian theatre and film actor. He played in a total of 400 plays as well as a single film - Hitar Petar. His name has become an idiom in colloquial Bulgarian used to express personal satisfaction or to describe something as being "excellent" or in "perfect condition".

== Life and career ==
Ideal Petrov was born in Varna on 18 May 1899. He tried acting during his school years, but his actual debut on stage came after a prolonged stay in Russia. He debuted in 1919 on the stage of the Varna Drama and Opera Theatre. Subsequently, he had three spells as an actor in the Probuda Theatre and the Varna Municipal Theatre. Between 1923 and 1925 he was part of the Popular Travelling Theatre and the Haskovo Town Theatre. Petrov proceeded to take roles in theatres around Bulgaria, in cities like Plovdiv, Ruse, Pleven, Burgas, and even in the Skopje People's Theatre that existed briefly during World War II.

His most prominent roles included that of Tartuffe in Molière's comedy of the same name, Luka in Maxim Gorky's The Lower Depths, and the Mayor in Nikolai Gogol's The Government Inspector. According to his grandson, Ideal Petrov was not a fan of cinema and only agreed to take part in a single movie. He played the role of Hasan Pasha in a film about the fictional character Hitar Petar.

Ideal Petrov died in his home city of Varna on 20 September 1983.

== Legacy ==
Petrov's popularity as an actor led to his name turning into an idiom for something of "great quality". According to his grandson, Ideal Petrov was still alive at the time the term was coined. Calling a performance or an item "Ideal Petrov" is common in colloquial Bulgarian. The term is also a pop-culture phenomenon having been used as a title of a popular song by rapper Krisko.
