= Ivan Dimov (scientist) =

Bulgarian mathematician and politician (born 1952)

- Born: 1952 (age 73–74); Asenovgrad, Bulgaria
- Education: M.S., Moscow Power Engineering Institute; Ph.D., Mathematical modelling, Moscow Power Engineering Institute; DS.c., Numerical Analysis, Moscow Power Engineering Institute
- Occupations: Deputy Minister for Education and Sciences
- Title: Professor

Ivan Dimov is currently an advisor to the Minister of Education and until September 2018, was the Deputy Minister for Education in the Ministry of Education and Science in Bulgaria. Bulgarian Prime Minister Boyko Borisov has appointed prof. Dimov in April 2016 in the second Borissov government.

Dimov succeeded Prof. Nikolai Denkov on the post. Prof. Dimov remained on the position of Deputy Minister during the Interim government of Ognyan Gerdzhikov, as well as in the Third Borisov Government.

Prof. Dimov's portfolio as a Deputy Minister is Higher Education and Research. His responsibilities include among other, reform in the science sector, development of contemporary strategy for research development in synergy with innovations, market application and economic development as well as human potential enhancement. Additionally, his tasks involve transitioning to a progressively increasing performance based funding and internationalization of the Bulgarian research system as a whole.

== Career ==
Prof. Dimov is an eminent Bulgarian scientist, professor in Mathematical Modelling at the Institute of Information and Communication Technologies at the Bulgarian Academy of Sciences IICT-BAS, Sofia, Bulgaria.

His research interests include Monte Carlo and quasi-Monte Carlo methods, superconvergent statistical numerical methods, parallel algorithms and GRIDs, mathematical modelling, and scientific computations in environmental mathematics, semi-conductors physics, financial mathematics.

Prof. Dimov is the Head of the Department of Parallel Algorithms, IICT-BAS, Sofia, Bulgaria. He was Director of the Institute for Parallel Processing, Bulgarian Academy of Sciences, Bulgaria, in the period 1996-2004. He is a Head of the Bulgarian Information Society Centre of Excellence for Education, Science and Technology in 21 Century (BIS-21), Bulgaria, from 2000, and a Chair of Scientific Council of IICT-BAS from 2010. Prof. Ivan Dimov has been Scientific secretary of the Bulgarian Academy of Sciences (2014-2015) with the role to ameliorate the links among the governmental policies and the scientific expertise setting up a line for development of responsible research and innovation. He started his research career at the Institute of Mathematics and Informatics at the Bulgarian Academy of Sciences IMI-BAS), Sofia, Bulgaria in 1982 as an Assistant Researcher in Numerical Analysis and Senior Scientific Researcher (Associate Professor) in Numerical Analysis in IMI-BAS after obtaining the second scientific degree of Doctor of sciences in 1984.

== Scientific Publications and Research Projects ==
Prof. Ivan Dimov lectured as a professor at the University of Reading, UK, School of Systems Engineering, ACET Center in 2005-2007.

He has published 3 monographs – Computational and Numerical Challenges in Environmental Modelling (2006), Monte Carlo Methods for Applied Scientist (2009) and (2017).

He is an editor of 8 international scientific journals published in Springer-Verlag, World Scientific, Elsevier. Dimov has published over 150 articles in peer-reviewed international scientific journals, including Numerical Methods and Applications: 5th International Conference, NMA 2002, Borovets, Bulgaria, August 20-24, 2002, Revised Papers - Lecture Notes in Computer Science 2542.

During the last 5 years, he has participated in 18 research projects (5 national and 13 international), whereas he coordinated 4 of these projects.

== Bibliography ==
- Dimov, Ivan (2008). Monte Carlo Methods for Applied Scientists. New Jersey: World Scientific. ISBN 978-981-02-2329-8.
- Zlatev, Zahari; Dimov, Ivan (2006). Computational and Numerical Challenges in Environmental Modelling. Amsterdam: Elsevier. ISBN 978-0-444-52209-2.
- Dimov, Ivan, et al. Richardson Extrapolation: Practical Aspects and Applications. Vol. 2. Walter de Gruyter GmbH & Co KG, 2017. ISBN 978-3110516494
