= Dimiter Orahovats =

Bulgarian physiologist

Dimiter Orahovats (1892—1992) was a prominent Bulgarian physiologist.

He was rector of Sofia University from 1945-1947.
