= Emil Kyulev =

Bulgarian banker (1957–2005)

President of the Bulgarian Swimming Federation
- In office 2003–2005

Personal details
- Born: Emil Aleksandrov Kyulev; June 5, 1957 Sofia, Bulgaria
- Died: October 26, 2005 (aged 48) Sofia, Bulgaria
- Education: University for National and World Economy (UNWE) (MIО)

Emil Aleksandrov Kyulev (Bulgarian: Емил Александров Кюлев) (June 5, 1957 – October 26, 2005) was a Bulgarian banker best known for his development of Bulgaria’s banking sector during the country's post-communist transition. He was the owner of DZI Bank, which was one of the first Bulgarian banks to attract foreign capital from international public markets. Kyulev also served as President of the Bulgarian Swimming Federation.

== Life ==
Emil Aleksandrov Kyulev was born on June 5, 1957, in Sofia, Bulgaria. He was an elite swimmer and also a member of the BUL Junior's National team excelling in breaststroke. Later in life he would go on to serve as president of the board of directors of the Bulgarian Swimming Federation.

Kyulev graduated with a degree in higher education at the University of National and World Economy in Sofia, specialising in finance and economics.

He entered the financial sector during Bulgaria’s transition from communism to a market economy, rapidly climbing the corporate ladder. In 1998, he acquired DZI Bank, which was facing financial difficulties, and restructured it. Under his leadership, the bank attracted foreign investors and rose to prominence for its modern financial services. Kyulev was one of the first Bulgarian businessmen to attract foreign capital from international public markets and, in 2002, was named "Mister Economy" in 2002 for his outstanding contributions to Bulgaria's economic development. Shareholders during his leadership in DZI Bank included Julius Baer (5.52%), RAIFFEISEN Zentralbank (1.18%), Bank Austria Creditanstalt (9.86%), SEB Group (2.59%), Erste Bank (1.43%) and Swedbank Robur Fonder (0.47%).

Kyulev was assassinated in broad daylight while driving his SUV down Boulevard Bulgaria in Sofia on October 26, 2005. The murder remains unsolved.
