= Mimoza Konteva =

Bulgarian geographer (1952–2018)

Mimoza Georgieva Konteva
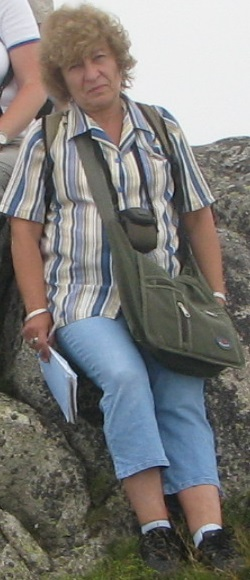
- Born: 22 December 1952; Sofia, Bulgaria
- Died: 7 June 2018 (aged 65); Sofia, Bulgaria
- Burial place: Central Sofia Cemetery
- Other name: Mimoza Georgieva Konteva-Simeonova
- Education: Sofia University
- Occupations: Geographer, landscape scientist, professor

Mimoza Georgieva Konteva (1952–2018), was a Bulgarian geographer, landscape scientist and associate professor. She became one of the senior authorities of geography and landscape studies in Bulgaria.

== Biography ==
Konteva was born on 22 December 1952 in Sofia and she graduated in Geography from Sofia University in 1974. She was appointed an assistant professor in 1978 at the newly established Department of Landscape Science and Environmental Conservation at the Faculty of Geology and Geography of Sofia University, and in 1981 she defended her dissertation on Landscapes of the Karlovo Valley and its fence slopes, their use and conservation, which was one of the first diploma theses with a landscape theme.

She taught Physical Geography of Continents, Physical Geography of Bulgaria, Landscape Science and other disciplines. In the 1980s she conducted a two-month specialization at Martin Luther University in Halle, Germany. In 1995 she won a competition to become an associate professor. She was named head of the department from 2002 to 2006. The courses she taught included, Natural Geography of the Continents, Landscape Ecology, Environment and Natural Resources, Natural Geography of the Balkan Peninsula, Geoecological Problems and Protected Areas of Selected World Regions, Landscape Mapping and Mapping Regional Problems of Natural Use.

Konteva worked in the fields of landscape mapping, structure and dynamics of natural complexes, and anthropogenic landscape science. She authored more than 60 articles and papers from scientific conferences, two monographs, one textbook and one scientific manual, and for secondary school students, Konteva created a series of maps on natural geography in atlases for grades 5, 6, 7, 8, 9 and 10. She led and participated in a number of practical and applied thematic studies on NIS for the municipality of Kremikovtzi, the Jerman-Skakavitsa derivation, Burel, the Berkovska, Koznitsa and Vlahina mountains. She participated in the European Union international project called Network for Intercultural Dialogue and Education: Turkey - Bulgaria (TR0604.01 - 03/071). In June 2003 she presented a series of lectures at the University of Cologne, Germany.

In 2016, Mimoza Konteva retired after 38 years of scientific and teaching activity at the Department of Landscape Science and Conservation of the Natural Environment at the Faculty of Geology and Geography of Sofia University. She had advised more than 30 graduates and 2 doctoral students.

Konteva died on 7 June 2018 in Sofia and was buried in Central Sofia Cemetery.
