= Stephan Angeloff =

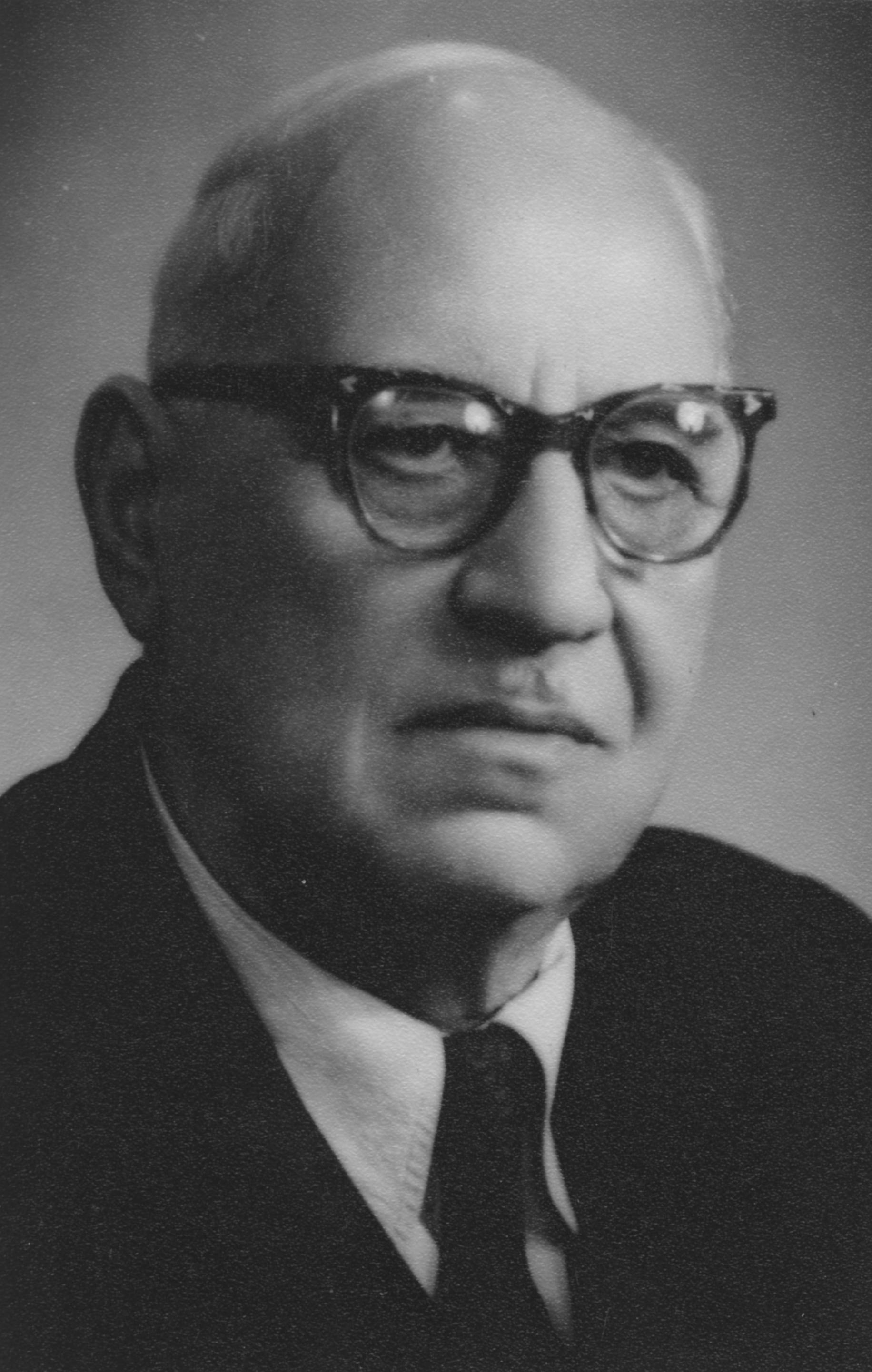

Stephan Angeloff (Bulgarian: Стефан Ангелов) (1878–1964) was a Bulgarian microbiologist. He was a member of the Bulgarian Academy of Sciences and the Academy of Sciences Leopoldina, and served as rector of Sofia University from 1941 to 1942.
