= Boris Komitov (astronomer) =

Boris Petrov Komitov
- Born: April 5, 1954; Stara Zagora, Bulgaria
- Died: July 25, 2025 (aged 71); Stara Zagora, Bulgaria
- Citizenship: Bulgarian
- Education: University of Sofia (B.S & M.S); Institute of Astronomy of the Bulgarian Academy of Sciences (Ph.D.)
- Scientific career
- Fields: astronomy, geophysics, planetary science, solar physics
- Thesis: "On the Dynamics of Cometary Matter" (1990)

Boris Petrov Komitov (Bulgarian: Борис Петров Комитов) (April 5, 1954 - July 25, 2025) was a Bulgarian astronomer and geophysicist. He was an active researcher in the fields of physics of planetary and comet atmospheres, solar physics and solar-climate relationships. He authored more than 79 peer-reviewed science articles, 50 popular-science articles as well as 3 books concerning the physics of the Solar System, the Sun and the Solar-Earth Connections. In 2008 the Minor Planet Centre at the International Astronomical Union named an asteroid from the main asteroid belt (between Mars and Jupiter) after him in recognition of his scientific contributions and educational work (20363 Komitov 1998KU1).
