= Moshe Dvoretzky =

Bulgarian actor

Moshe Dvoretzky (alternative spelling "Dvoretzki", Bulgarian: Моше Дворецки; born 1922 in Haskovo, Bulgaria) was a Bulgarian actor. Moshe Dvoretzky was one of the founders of the Dimitrovgrad Theatre. He played dozens of leading parts there and directed several plays. Moshe Dvoretzky also worked as a theatre actor in Haskovo, Plovdiv and Pazardzhik. He played various parts in several Bulgarian films, including "The Sedmaks' Last Supper" (1957), "Past-Master On the Excursion" (1980) and "The Master of Boyana" (1981).

Moshe Dvoretzky died in Sofia in 1988 following an unsuccessful heart bypass operation.
