= Ralitsa Tcholakova =

Bulgarian musician

Ralitsa Tcholakova is a Canadian violinist with Bulgarian roots.

== Early life ==
Tcholakova obtained a Master's degree from the State Academy of Music in Bulgaria, and a Diploma from the Hochschule fur Musik und Darstellende Kunst in Vienna. She has been a Long Term Artist in Residency at the Banff Centre for the Arts. During her residency at The Banff Centre, Tcholakova was involved in more than 25 concerts, including Chamber Music performances with Lawrence Lesser and Gilbert Kelish.

== Career ==
Tcholakova has an international solo career, and has performed as a soloist with orchestras and at chamber music series and festivals in Albania, Argentina, Austria, Belgium, Bulgaria, Canada, Chile, Czech Republic, Denmark, Ecuador, France, Germany, Macedonia, Russia, Slovakia, Slovenia, Serbia, USA, Paraguay and Uruguay. Her concerts have been recorded for broadcast for CBC and other radio stations in Canada, as well as for Bulgarian and Argentinean National radio and television.

Tcholakova is also a published author. In 2006, her essay Footsteps to Eternity about Mozart's life, was published in the first anthology book in connection with the celebration of the composer's 250th birth anniversary in Bulgaria. The anthology Mozart-Genius is a project sponsored by the Austrian Embassy in Sofia, Bulgaria.

In 2008 her paper on "Women Composers from Quebec city" was published in a Journal for Canadian Studies in Argentina.

In 2006 the Canadian Embassy in Romania granted Tcholakova their entire budget for promotion of Canadian Culture in Bulgaria, in order to organize "Days of Canadian Culture" festivals in Sofia, November 24–26, 2006, December 1–2, 2007, November 29–30, 2008, November 29-December 5, 2010 and November 29–30, 2012.

In June 2008 Ralitsa Tcholakova received a grant from Ottawa City Arts Funding for music recording and together with Elaine Keillor recently recorded a CD at the Glenn Gould Studio in Toronto. The CD “Remembered Voices” features music by Canadian composers Gena Branscombe, Violet Archer, Mary Gardiner and Patrick Cardy, as well as pieces by the Bulgarian composer Pantcho Vladigerov. The CD is released under the label “Carleton Sound” affiliated with Carleton University and distributed to all CBC (national radio) libraries across Canada.

Ralitsa has recorded numerous CDs with grants from FACTOR and Ottawa City Arts Funding such as "Soul of Tango", "Remembered Voices", "Ballade of the North", "Rally Live" in concert etc.

Her CDs are highly acclaimed. The CD "Ballad of the North" consisting of music by Canadian women composers received a grant from SOCAN foundation towards international distribution to 135 radio stations around the world.

Her CD, “Aboriginal Inspirations” featuring multiple Grammy winner Ron Korb is promoted nationally and internationally by the Canadian Music Centre and NAXOS. Since 2015, Ralitsa has performed annual recitals at the Parliament of Canada.

"As a violin and piano recording, this one is immediately evident as being at the top of the genre. Performers are first rate, and playing with a passion. Audio production is unusually well done ...Excellent choices were made for the music on this CD. ...Tcholakova and Keillor show an admirable commitment to Canadian repertoire, beginning with Gena Branscombe's unjustly neglected A minor Sonata, well represented in this performance." And the review ends: "An excellent CD." (Whole Note magazine)

"Tcholakova and Keillor are wonderful collaborators who perform with sound musical chemistry. They present a polished, single-minded vision of the music and are able to create all the necessary moments of passion, lyricism, austerity, and dramatic climax. Tcholokova's intonation is excellent, and she possesses a rich and vibrant tone in the gypsy music, and one that is more subtle and intensive in the more serious works... These are voices worthy of remembering." (IAWM Journal)

Her CD, “Aboriginal Inspirations” featuring multiple Grammy winner Ron Korb is promoted nationally and internationally by the Canadian Music Centre and NAXOS. Since 2015, Ralitsa has performed annual recitals at the Parliament of Canada.

Her CDs "Soul of Tango", "Remembered Voices", "Ballad of the North" and "Aboriginal Inspirations" are available on iTunes and on the Web.

In 2022, she premiered her composition Prayer for Peace, commissioned by Evelyn Stroobach, at the Laureate Gala at Carnegie Hall. In November 2023, Ralitsa performed as a soloist with the New York Chamber Players at Weill Recital Hall, Carnegie Hall. In November 2024 and 2025, she returned to Carnegie Hall as a soloist with the Manhattan Orchestra under the baton of David Wroe.

== Discography ==
- Ballad of the North (2011)
1. "Ballad of The North"
2. "Souvenir"
3. "Freya"
4. "Les Ombres"
5. "Chant"
6. "Postcards from Home, 'Alberta Clipper'"
7. "Postcards from Home, 'Horizon at Down'"
8. "Postcards from Home, 'Hoe-down'"
- Remembered Voices (2008)
1. "Chant from the Suite Bulgare"
2. "Rhapsody Vardar"
3. "Humoresque from Miniatures"
4. "Hora Staccato"
5. "Sonata in A minor for violin and piano"
6. "Fantasy for violin and piano"
7. "Prelude and Allegro"
8. "Liesel, Suse, Ilze and Gerda"
9. "Remembered Voices: Song, Elegy, Dance"
- Soul of Tango (2007)
1. "Tango"
2. "Libertango"
3. "Tanguisimo"
4. "Boricua"
5. "Revirado"
6. "Tango"
7. "Oblivion"
8. "Impresionista"
9. "Melodia en La Menor"
10. "Introduction Al Angel"

== Awards ==
Tcholakova is the recipient of numerous bursaries, scholarships, awards and grants such as Svetoslav Obretenov Bulgarian National Competition, Sarasota Kiwanis Club, Baden – Baden Lion's Club, Ottawa Symphony Orchestra, Austrian Ministry of Culture, FACTOR, Europe 2000, Ottawa city Arts Funding, Canada Arts Council, Schenkman Arts Center, SOCAN foundation and the Canadian Department of Foreign Affairs. In 2016 she was nominated for Ottawa Arts Council Awards; Victor Tolgesy Arts award nomination and Mid-Career Artist award nomination. In 2017 she was nominated for Governor General award commemorating the Persons case. Currently nominated for the Premier's Award for Excellence in the Arts at OAC. She is two times winner of Weill Recital Carnegie Hall auditions. In 2022 as a violist and in 2023 as violinist.
