= Boris Komitov (singer) =

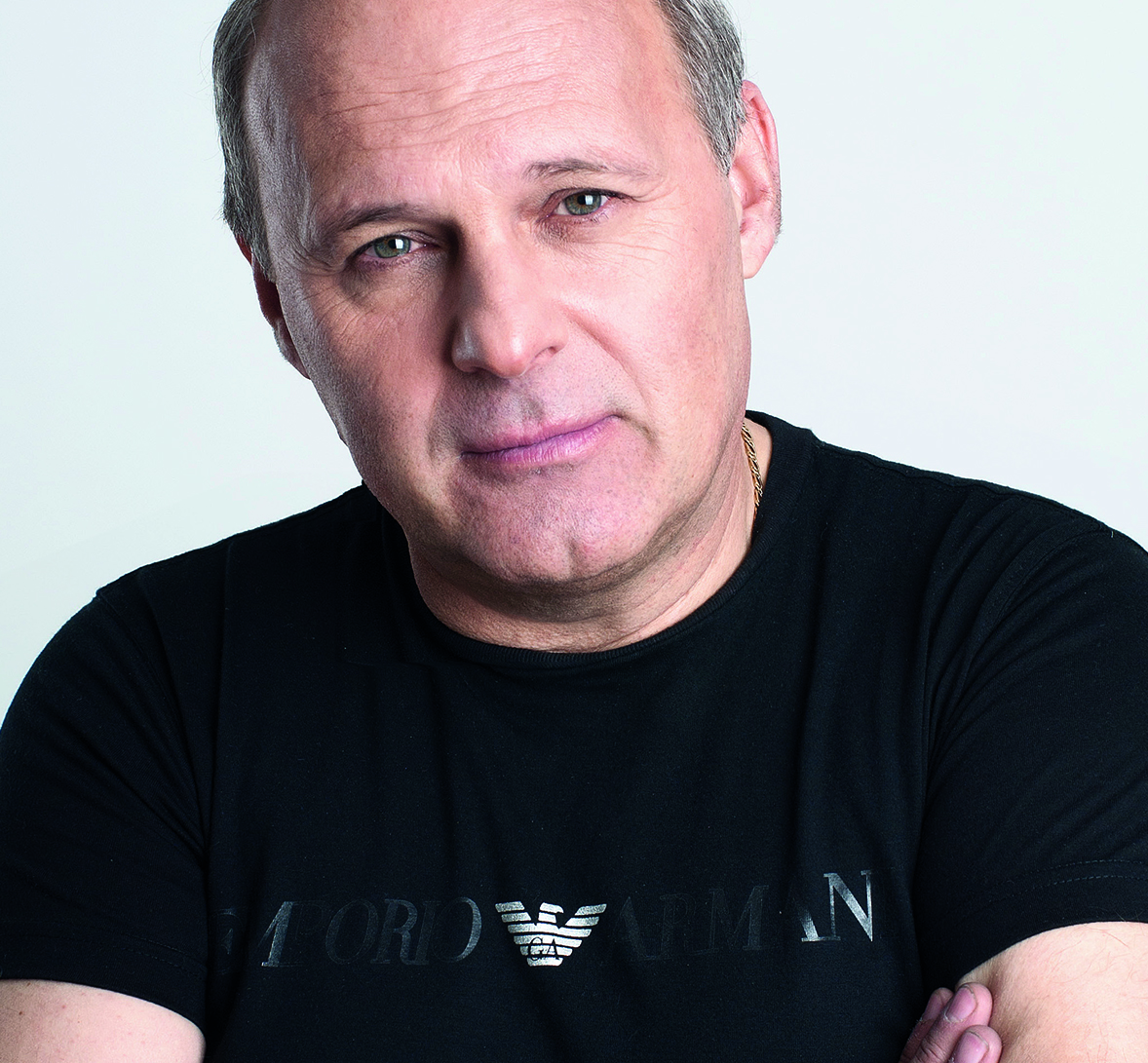

Background information
- Birth name: Boris Petrov Komitov
- Born: 12 December 1952 (age 72); Plovdiv, Bulgaria
- Genres: Pop
- Occupations: Singer, songwriter
- Instruments: vocal
- Years active: 1971–present
- Labels: Bove-7
- Website: boriskomitov.com
- Impact: Emil Dimitrov, Michel Sardou, Al Stewart

Boris Petrov Komitov (born 12 December 1952) in Plovdiv, Bulgaria is a Bulgarian pop singer, songwriter, pianist and guitarist.

In October 2012, Komitov presented a new album titled "A Strange Lesson". It was promoted on 1 December 2012 at the Dramatical Theatre in Plovdiv with the special appearance of Yordanka Hristova, Rosi Ruseva and ballet "Magica".

Between 2013 and 2014, some of Boris’ musical compositions were recorded and arranged for piano (classical style) by Stoic Gadev.
