= Stefan Tsanev =

Bulgarian journalist, writer, playwright, essayist, poet, and translator (born 1936)

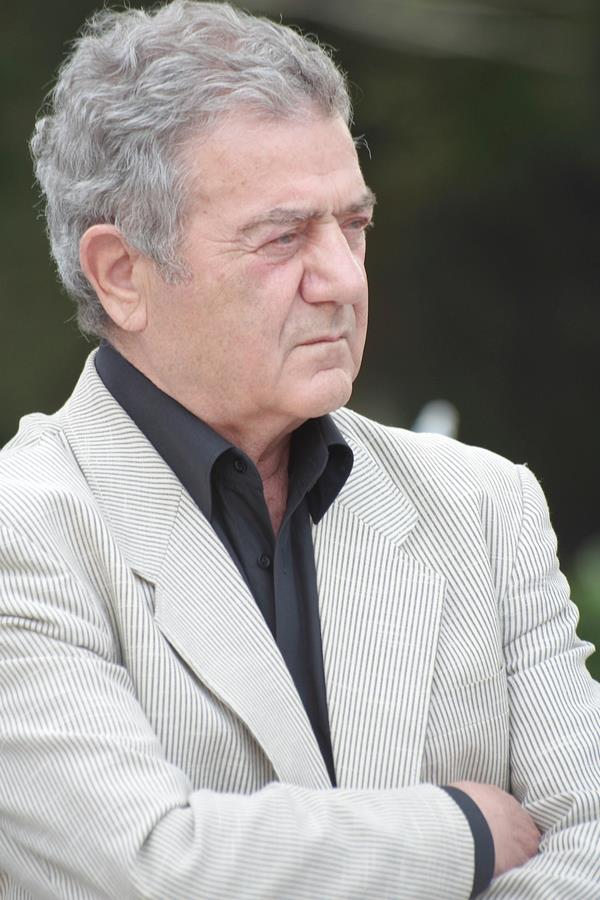
- Born: August 7, 1936 (age 90); Chervena Voda, near Rousse, Bulgaria
- Occupations: Novelist, essayist, playwright, poet
- Writing career
- Genres: poem, novel

Stefan Nedelchev Tsanev (Bulgarian: Стефан Неделчев Цанев; born 7 August 1936) is a contemporary Bulgarian writer, known for his essays, plays, poems, and historical novels.

His books include Ubiytsite sa mezhdu nas (Bulgarian: Убийците са между нас; The killers are among us), and his plays, Istinskiyat Ivaylo (Bulgarian: Истинският Ивайло; The true Ivaylo), which was banned for alleged parallels between the feudal hierarchy depicted in the play, and the socialist regime in Bulgaria.

Tsanev's latest four-volume work, Bulgarian Chronicles, uncovers previously hidden facts, added to the well-known, in Bulgaria's history: 2137 BC to the present.
