= Anton Strashimirov =

Bulgarian writer

- Антон Страшимиров
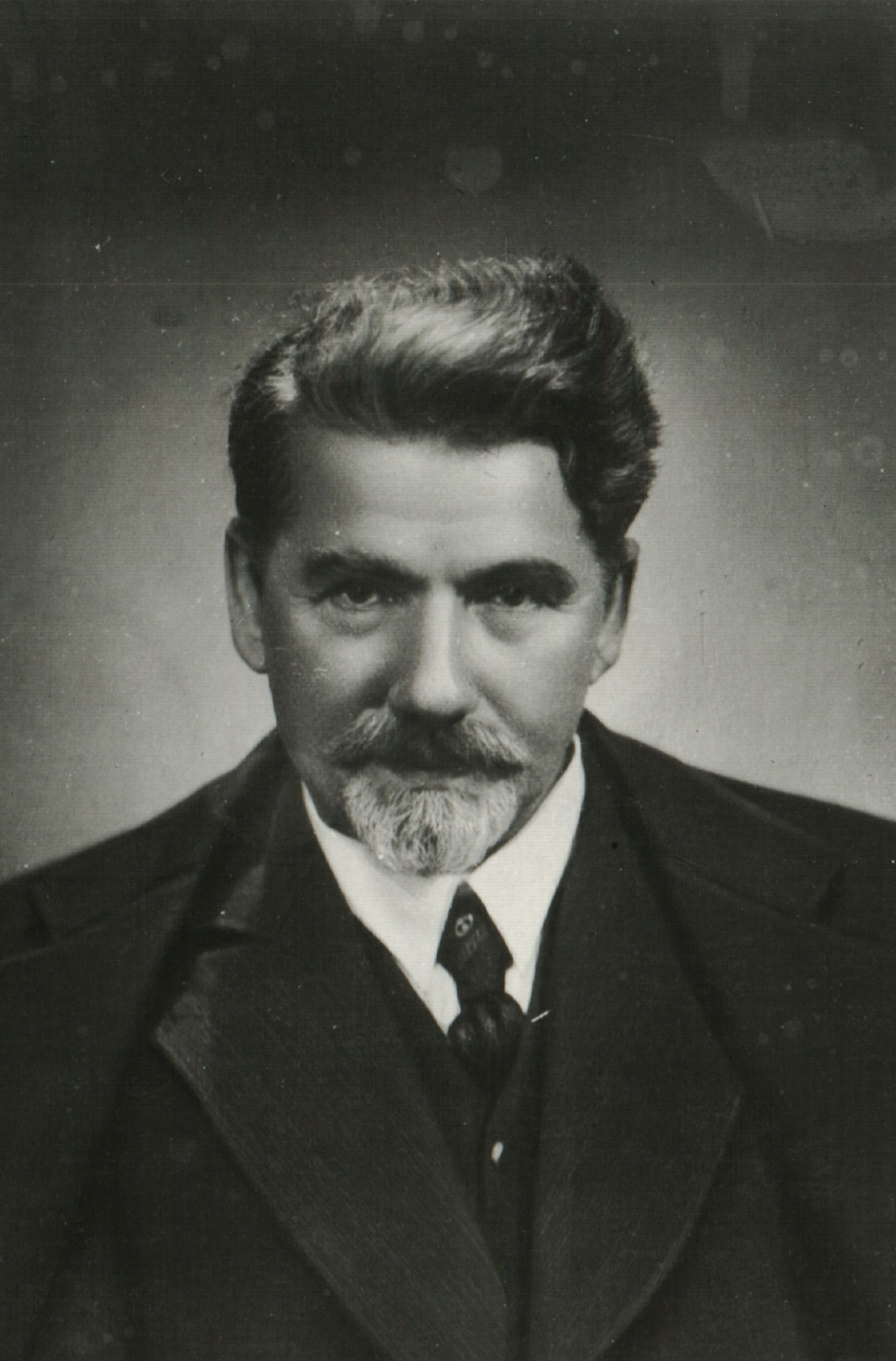
- Born: June 15, 1872; Varna, Ottoman Empire
- Died: December 7, 1937 (aged 65); Vienna, Austria
- Occupations: Writer, playwright, publicist, politician
- Spouse: Stefka Simova
- Writing career
- Pen name: N. Bistrenov, Bosilko, A. Budnev, Danila, V. Danilov, Doyrian, G. Zhivkov, Zemen, Istrov, Cinemas, K. Kanchev, Mirjo, Observer, Postov
- Language: Bulgarian
- Genres: Short story, novel, play
- Notable works: "Mother of God" (1906) "Horo" (1926)
- Notable awards: Academy Award for the novel "Autumn Days" (1901)
- Literary movement: Modernism

Anton Strashimirov (Bulgarian: Антон Страшимиров) (Varna, 15 June 1872 – Vienna, 7 December 1937) was a Bulgarian author.
