= Marius Kurkinski =

Bulgarian actor, director, film writer and pop singer

Marius Kurkinski Мариус Куркински
- Born: 15 October 1969
- Occupation: Actor

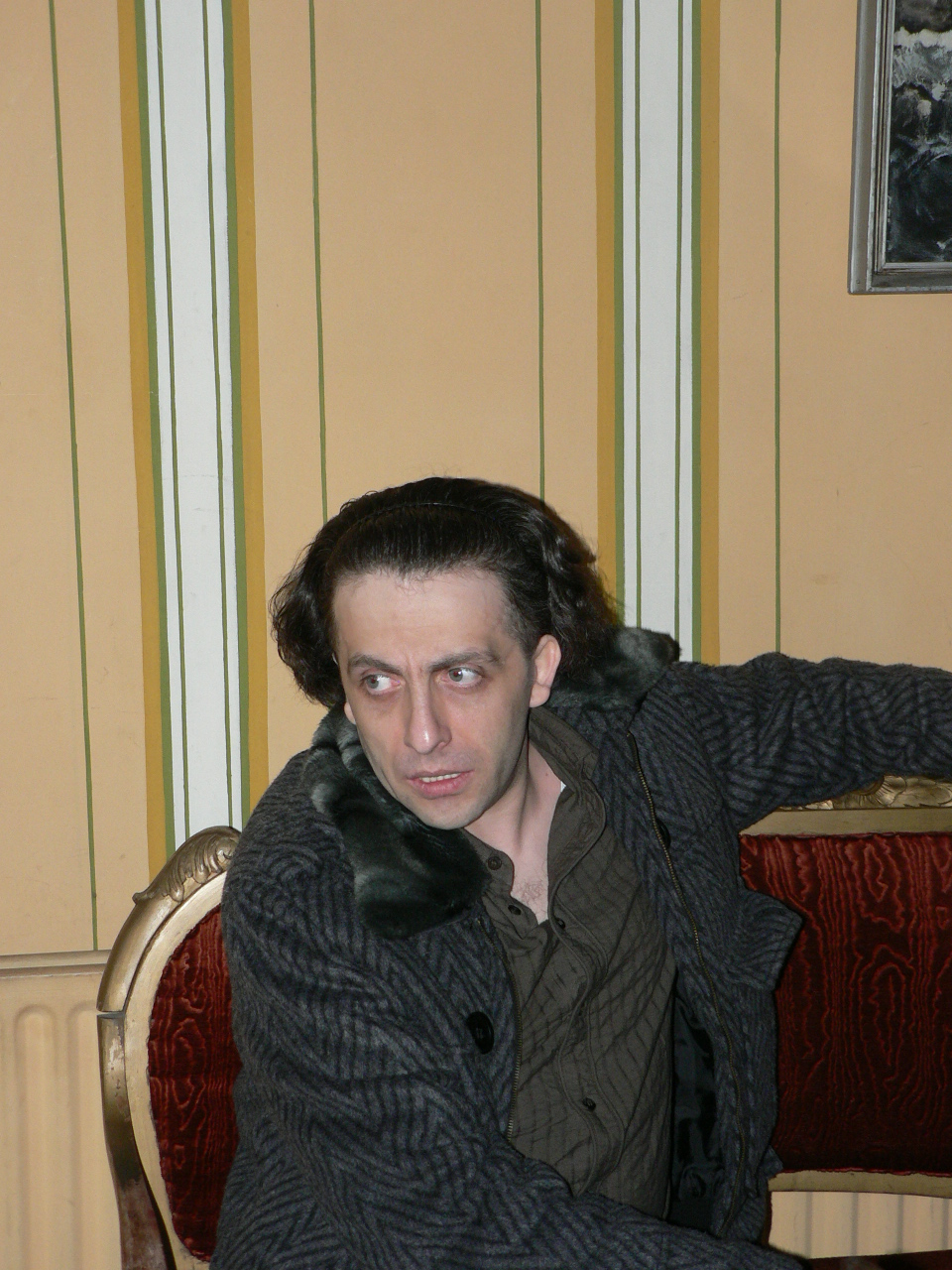
Marius Kurkinski

Ivaylo Stoyanov (Bulgarian: Ивайло Стоянов) (born 15 October 1969), better known as Marius Kurkinski (Мариус Куркински), is a Bulgarian actor, director, film writer and pop singer. He wrote, directed and starred in the 1996 Bulgarian film Dnevnikat Na Edin Lud (The Diary of a Madman).

== Biography ==
Kurkinski has built a reputation both in Bulgaria and abroad for his one-man shows such as "The Lady with the Dog” and "The Lone Man". He won the award Europe's Actor in the International Monodrama Festival in Oteševo, Republic of Macedonia for his performance of "The Dream" by Julian Barnes in 2003. Later that year, he won the Apolonia Award at the Apollonia Festival held in Sozopol, Bulgaria. In honour of the awards, he was invited to participate in World Theatre Day on March 27, 2004 held in Paris, France.

He is openly gay.

== Filmography ==
- Sirna Nedelya (a.k.a. A Day of Forgiveness 1993)
- La Donna e Mobile (1993)
- Granitza (a.k.a. The Border 1994)
- Dnevnikat Na Edin Lud (a.k.a. Diary of a Madman 1996)
- Pryatelite na Emiliya (a.k.a. Emilia's Friends 1996)
- Vsichko Ot Nula (a.k.a. Starting From the Scratch 1996)
- Ad Libitum 4 Variatzii Na Graf dyo Burbulon (a.k.a. Ad Libitum: Variations of Count de Bourboulon 2000)
- Posseteni ot Gosspoda (a.k.a. Meme Dieu est venu nous voir released in Bulgaria 2001 and in France 2003)
- Opashkata na Dyavola (a.k.a. Devil's Tail 2001)
- Zasukan Sviat (a.k.a. A Twisted World 2019)
