= List of Bulgarian musicians and singers =

This is a list of notable Bulgarian musicians and singers.

- 100 Kila
- Aksinia Chenkova
- Alek Sandar
- Alexander Raytchev
- Alexandrina Miltcheva
- Alexandrina Pendatchanska
- Alexis Weissenberg
- Alisia
- Ana-Maria Yanakieva
- Andrea
- Andriana Yordanova
- Anelia
- Angela Tosheva
- Ani Hoang
- Anna Tomowa-Sintow
- Armand Tokatyan
- Aron Aronov
- Azis
- Bantcho Bantchevsky
- Bedros Kirkorov
- Big Sha
- Biser Kirov
- Bogdana Karadocheva
- Boiko Zvetanov
- Boris Christoff
- Boris Godjunov
- Boris Karlov
- Boris Komitov
- Ciguli
- Christiana Loizu
- Christina Morfova
- Daniel Spassov
- Daniela Radkova
- Danny Levan
- Dara
- DARA
- Darina Takova
- Desi Slava
- Dessislava Stefanova
- Deyan Nedelchev
- Deyan Vatchkov
- Doni
- Dzhena
- Dzhina Stoeva
- Elena Nikolai
- Elitsa Todorova
- Emanuela
- Emil Dimitrov
- Emilia
- Fiki
- Galena
- Galina Savova
- Ghena Dimitrova
- Georgi Belev
- Georgi Minchev
- Gergana
- Gery-Nikol
- Gloria
- Iliya Argirov
- Irena Petkova
- Ivan Ivanov
- Ivan Yanakov
- Ivana
- Ivanka Ninova
- Ivo Papazov
- Jacob Soulliere
- Julia Tsenova
- Julian Konstantinov
- Kali
- Kamen Tchanev
- Kiril Manolov
- Kiril Marichkov
- Konstantin
- Krassimira Stoyanova
- Kremena Stancheva
- Krisia Todorova
- Kristian Kostov
- Krum
- Lea Ivanova
- LiLana
- Lili Ivanova
- Ljuba Welitsch
- Lubo Kirov
- Ludmilla Diakovska
- Lyubka Rondova
- Lyudmila Radkova
- Margarita Hranova
- Margret Nikolova
- Maria
- Maria Christova
- Maria Ilieva
- Maria Mitzeva
- Mariana Popova
- Marin Yonchev
- Marius Kurkinski
- Mariya Neikova
- Michail Belchev
- Michail Svetlev
- Mihaela Fileva
- Mihaela Marinova
- Mila Robert
- Milcho Leviev
- Milen E. Ivanov
- Milena Slavova
- Milenita
- Milko Kalaidjiev
- Mimi Balkanska
- Mira Aroyo
- Miroslav Kostadinov
- Nadezhda Panayotova
- Nadia Krasteva
- Nadka Karadjova
- Nayden Todorov
- Nelly Rangelova
- Neva Krysteva
- Nevena Tsoneva
- Nicola Ghiuselev
- Nicolai Ghiaurov
- Orlin Anastassov
- Orlin Goranov
- Pasha Hristova
- Penka Toromanova
- Peter Baykov
- Petia
- Petko Staynov
- Poli Genova
- Preslava
- Preyah
- Radka Toneff
- Raffaele Arié
- Raffi Boghosyan
- Raina Kabaivanska
- Ralitsa Tcholakova
- Reyhan Angelova
- Rumyana
- Ruslan Maynov
- Slavi Trifonov
- Slavin Slavchev
- Sofi Marinova
- Sonya Yoncheva
- Spens
- Stefan Dimitrov
- Stefan Valdobrev
- Stefka Evstatieva
- Suzanitta
- Svetla Protich
- Svetla Vassileva
- Svetlina Stoyanova
- Tanya Boeva
- Theodosii Spassov
- Tita
- Todor Kobakov
- Todor Kolev
- Toma Zdravkov
- Toni Storaro
- Tsvetelina
- Tsvetelina Yaneva
- Valeri Georgiev
- Valya
- Valya Balkanska
- Vanya Kostova
- Vanya Shtereva
- Vasko Vassilev
- Vassil Naidenov
- Ventsislav Yankov
- Veselin Marinov
- Vesko Eschkenazy
- Vesselina Kasarova
- Victoria Georgieva
- Viktor Paskov
- Vladimir Stoyanov
- Yildiz Ibrahimova
- Yoan Kukuzel
- Yordanka Hristova
- Yuri Boukoff
- Zhana Bergendorff

== See also ==
- List of Bulgarians
- List of Bulgarian actors
- Lists of musicians

== General sources ==
- Stoyan Petrov (Magdalena Manolova, Milena Bozhikova, revd) (2001) Bulgaria: Art music. Grove Music Online, Oxford University Press doi:10.1093/omo/9781561592630.013.60000200308
- Donna A. Buchanan (2001). Bulgaria: Traditional music. Grove Music Online, Oxford University Press doi:10.1093/omo/9781561592630.013.60000200309
