= Stanchev =

Stanchev (Bulgarian: Станчев) is a Bulgarian masculine surname, its feminine counterpart is Stancheva. It may refer to

- Denislav Stanchev (born 2000), Bulgarian football midfielder
- Dina Stancheva (1925–2010), Bulgarian architect
- Galina Stancheva, Bulgarian volleyball player
- Georgi Stanchev (born 1985), Bulgarian football striker
- Kameliya Stancheva, Antarctic explorer
  - Stancheva Peak in Antarctic, named after Kameliya
- Kiril Stanchev (1895–1968), Bulgarian general
- Kremena Stancheva (1941–2013), Bulgarian folk singer
- Lachezar Stanchev (1908–1992), Bulgarian poet
- Magdalina Stancheva (1924–2014), Bulgarian archaeologist and museologist
- Malina Stancheva (born 1967), Bulgarian pop-folk singer
- Marian Stanchev (born 1988), Bulgarian football defender
- Nayden Stanchev (born 1949), Bulgarian boxer
- Nikola Stanchev (1930–2009), Bulgarian freestyle wrestler
- Nikolay Stanchev (born 1980), Bulgarian track cyclist
- Stancho Stanchev, Bulgarian theatre director
- Stefan Stanchev (born 1989), Bulgarian footballer
- Todor Stanchev (1921–2002), Bulgarian sports shooter
- Tsvetanka Stancheva (born 1929), Bulgarian gymnast
- Valentin Stanchev (born 1968), Bulgarian football striker
- Vasilka Stancheva (born 1929), Bulgarian gymnast
