= Savov =

Savov (Bulgarian: Савов) is a Bulgarian masculine surname, its feminine counterpart is Savova. It may refer to

- Ekaterina Savova-Nenova (1901–1980), Bulgarian painter
- Galina Savova (1945–2021), Bulgarian operatic soprano
- Kondiu Savov, Bulgarian pop-folk singer
- Mihail Savov (1857–1928), Bulgarian general
- Stefka Savova (born 1958), Bulgarian chess master
- Žanko Savov (born 1965), Macedonian football coach and former player
