= Ludmila Prokopová =

Czech-Bulgarian pianist

Ludmila Prokopová Czech-Bulgarian pianist
- Людмила Прокопова
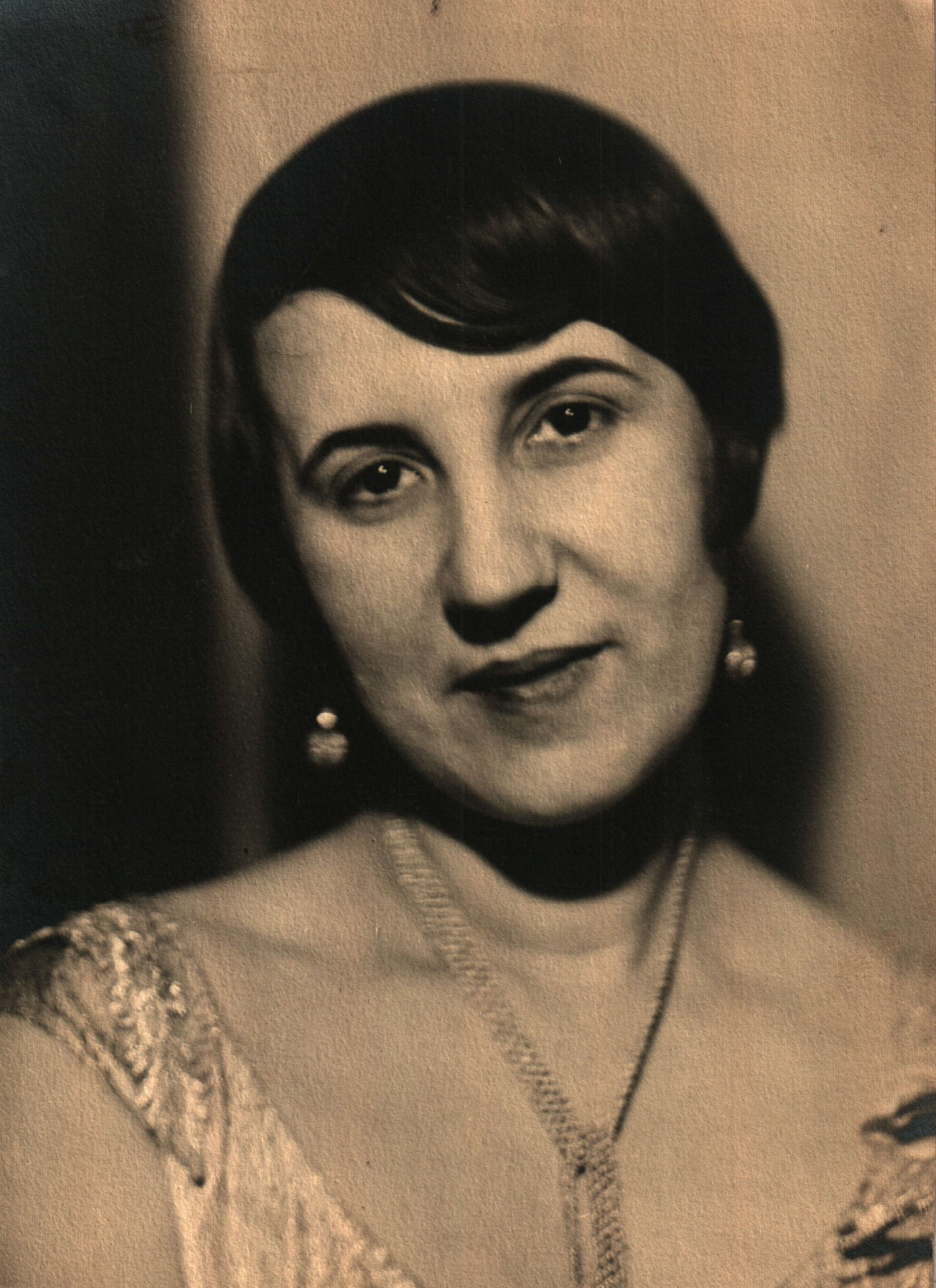
- Lyudmila Prokopová portrait photograph
- Born: 16 February 1888; Hradec Králové, Austria-Hungary
- Died: 6 April 1959 (aged 71); Sofia, Bulgaria
- Education: Prague Conservatory
- Years active: 1908–1958

Ludmila Prokopová (16 February 1888 – 6 April 1959) was a Czech-Bulgarian pianist and a music pedagogue.

== Biography ==
Ludmila Prokopová was born on 16 February 1888 in Hradec Králové, Bohemia, Austria-Hungary. She graduated from the conservatory college in Prague in 1908 in the class of Karel Hoffmaister and met the Bulgarian singer Christina Morfova during that time.

In the next two decades of her life, she often worked with Christina Morfova. In 1908 she started teaching music in Brno. In 1911 she went back to Bulgaria and from 1912 to 1916 she taught in the Musical school.

Between 1916 and 1930, Prokopová and Morfova travelled across Europe together as she accompanied her in her songs on stage.

She played a part in the Prague National Theatre during 1900, 1909, 1912, 1923, 1927, and 1928. She also performed in the East Czech Theatre, in the theatres in Brno, Olomouc, Plzeň, and the Slovak National Theatre in Bratislava during 1927 and 1933.

In 1930, she went back to Sofia and established a private school in her home. In 1942 she became a professor in the National conservatory. Raina Kabaivanska was her student there.

In 1950 she received the Dimitrovska nagrada, which is the highest honor in Bulgaria for contributions to the development of science, art and culture.

== Gallery ==
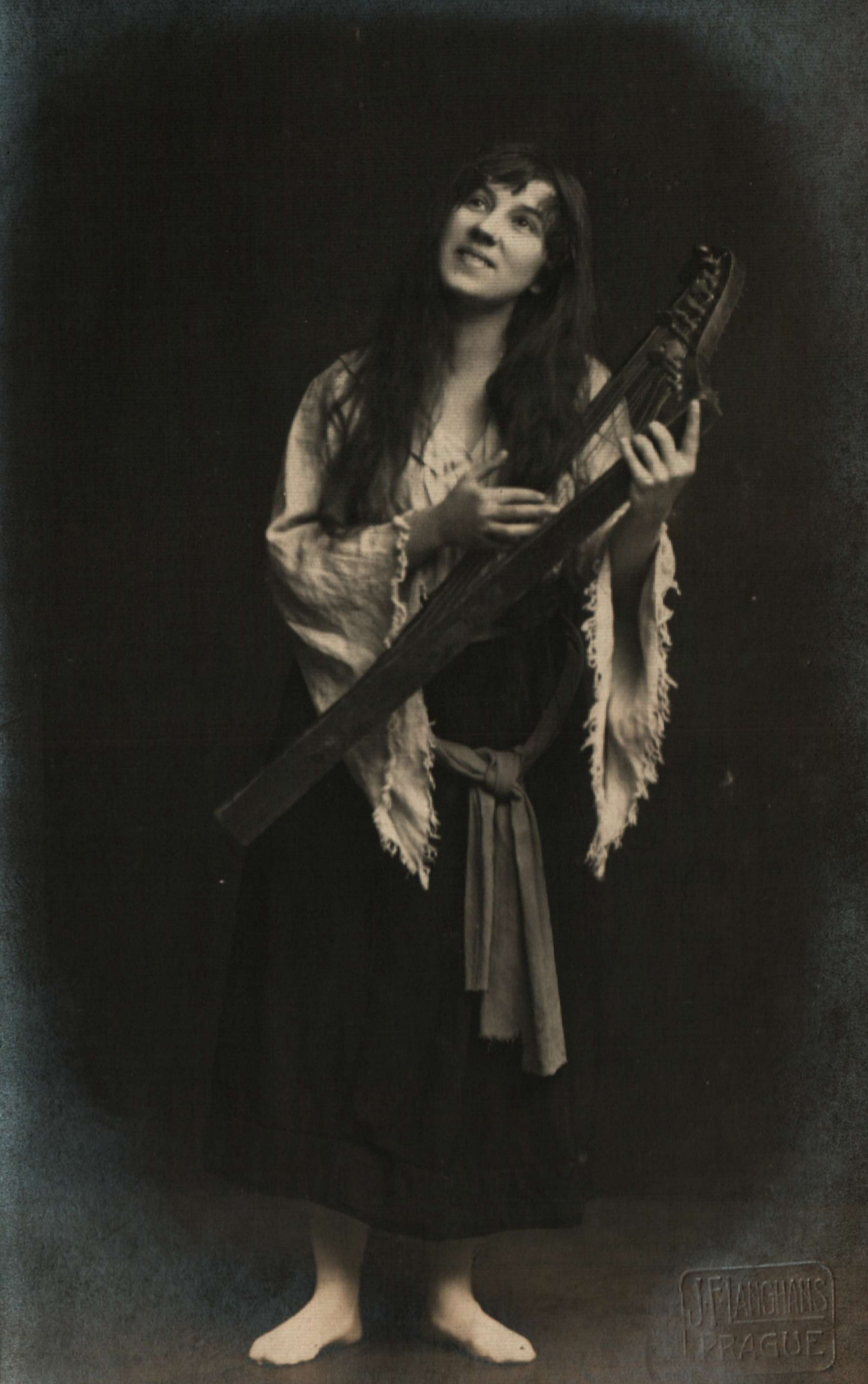
Ludmila Prokopová posing with a musical instrument

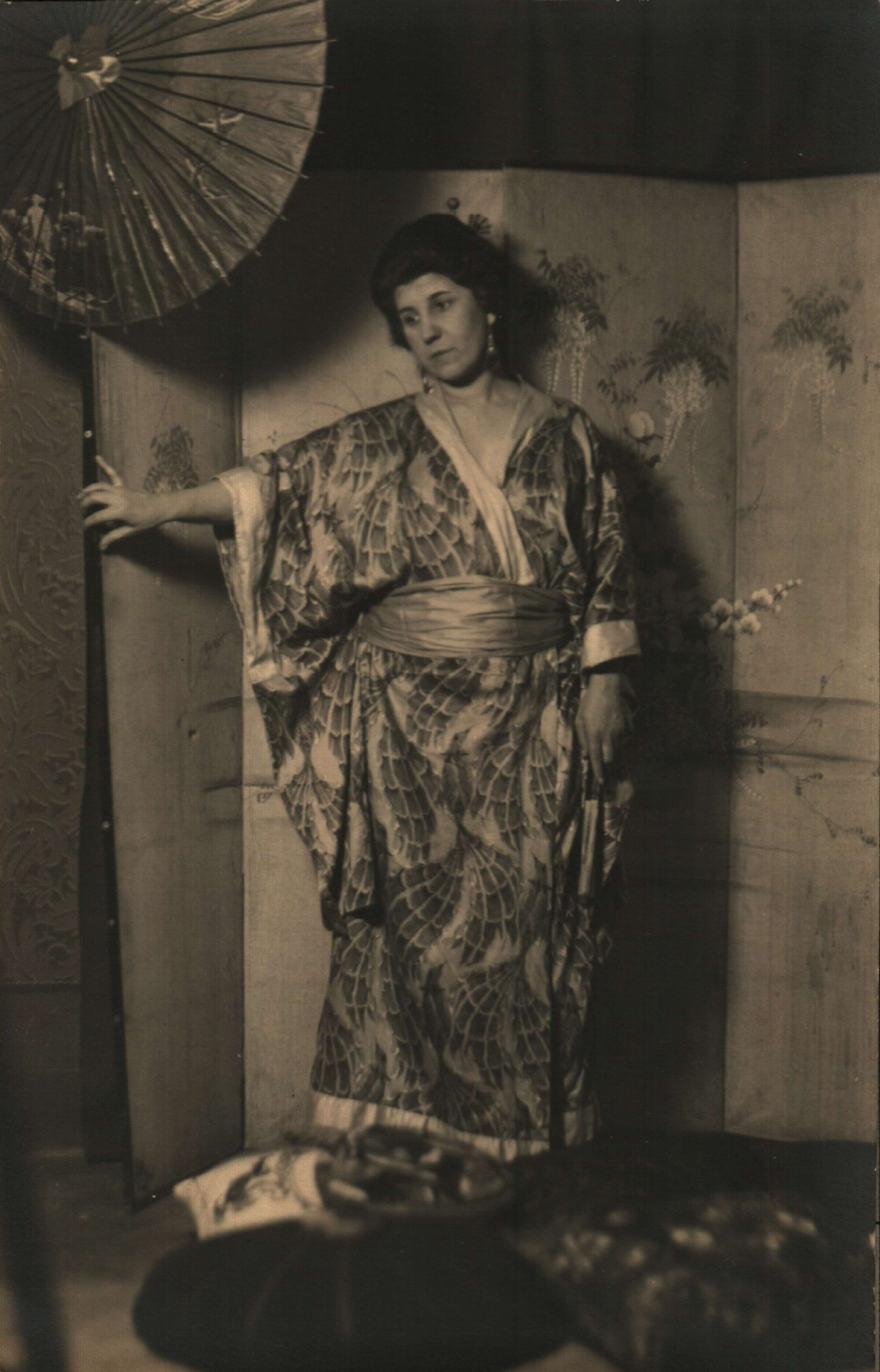
Ludmila Prokopová

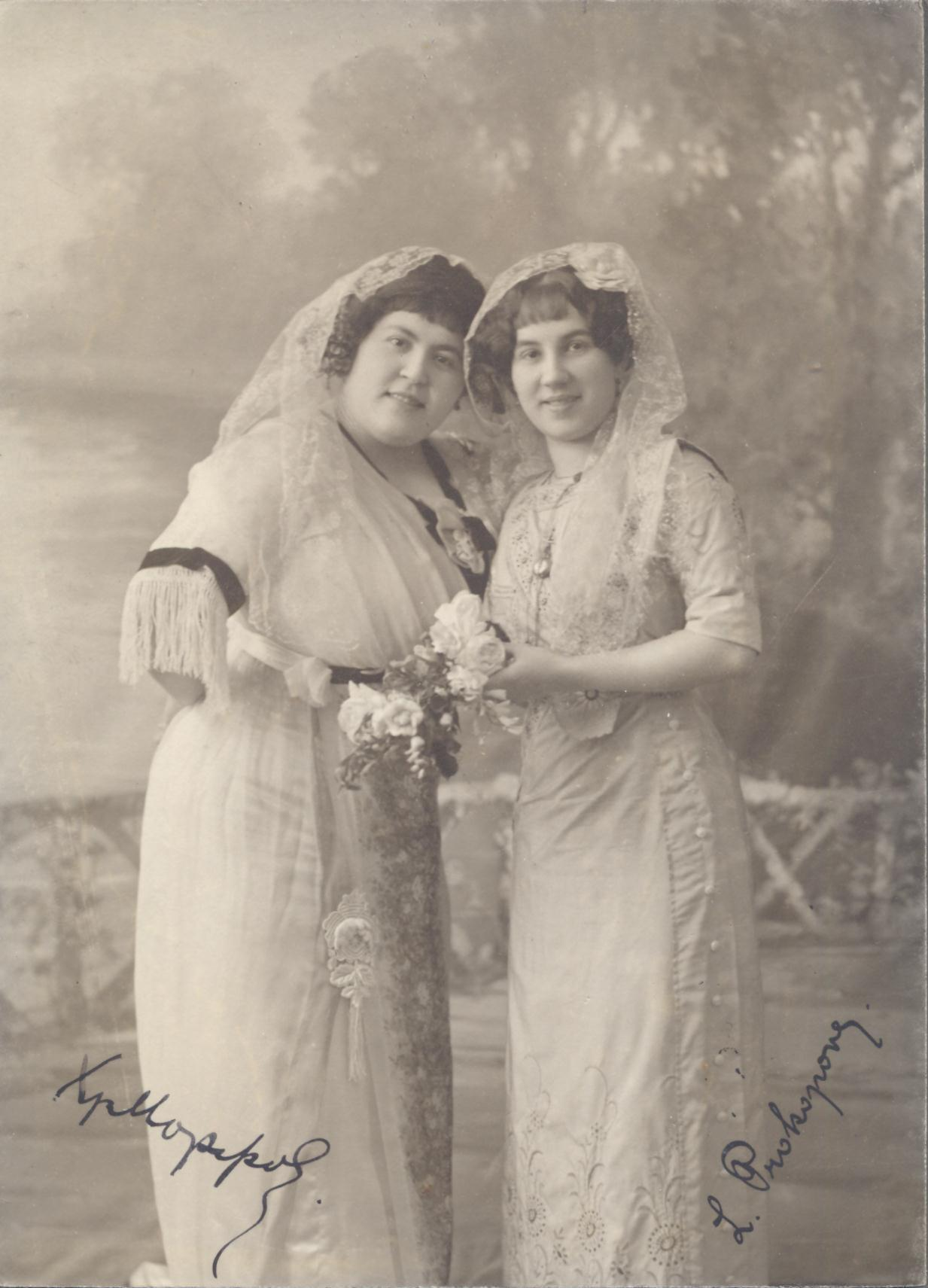
Christina Morfova and Ludmila Prokopová

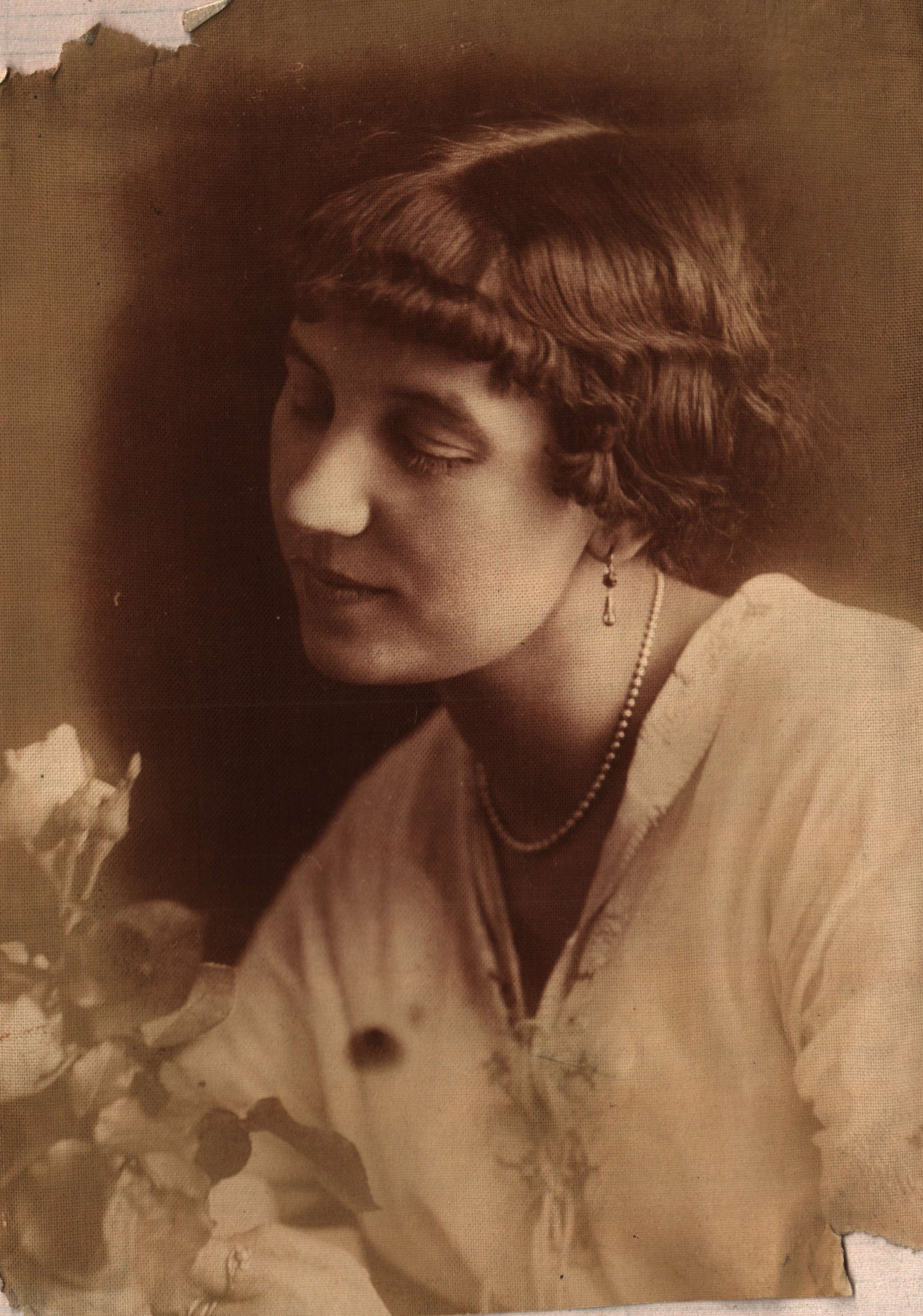
Ludmila Prokopová Before 1945
