= Chanev =

Chanev, Tchanev (Bulgarian: Чанев) is a Bulgarian surname. Notable people with the surname include:

- Kamen Tchanev (Kamen Chanev), Bulgarian operatic tenor
- Rousy Chanev (born 1945), Bulgarian actor
- Valchan Chanev (born 1992), Bulgarian footballer
