= State Opera Stara Zagora =

Bulgarian opera house in Stara Zagora

Coordinates: 42°25′39″N 25°37′34″E

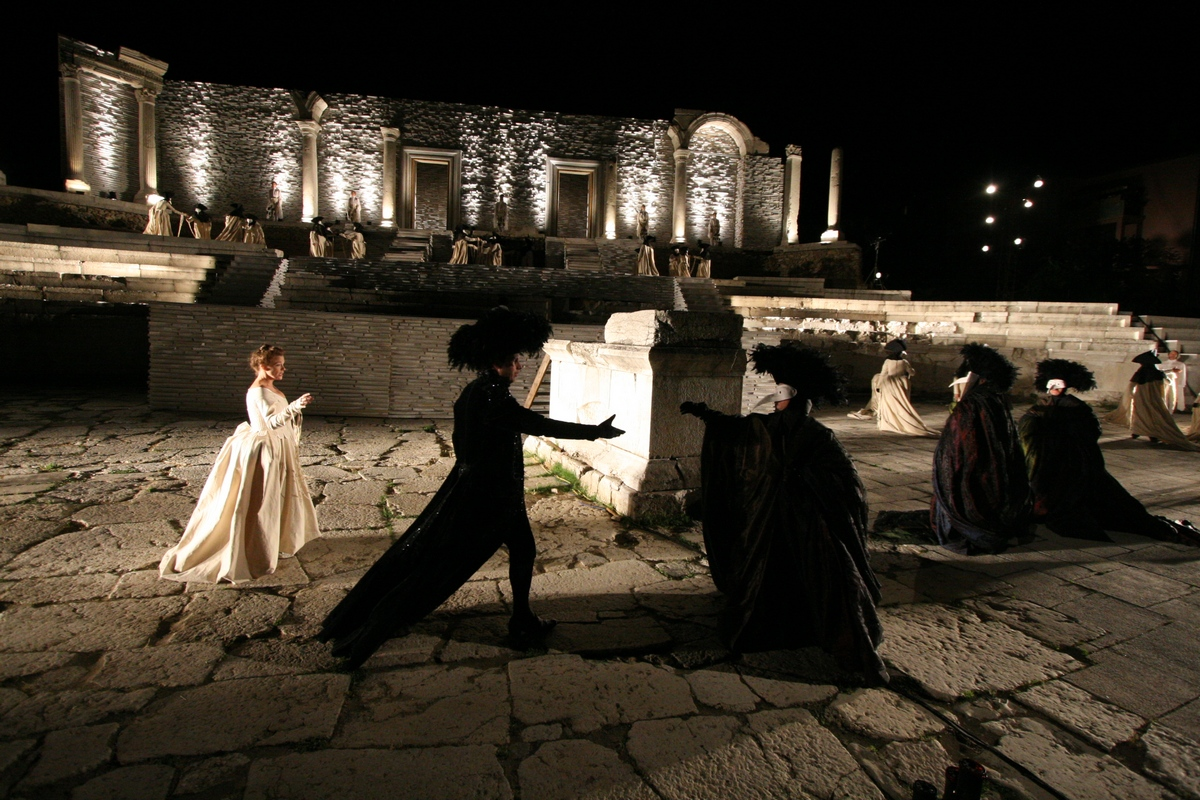
A performance of Don Giovanni by the State Opera Stara Zagora at the Augusta Trajana Roman ruins in the city

The State Opera Stara Zagora (Bulgarian: Държавна опера Стара Загора, Darzhavna opera Stara Zagora) is an opera and ballet theatre in Stara Zagora, Bulgaria. Founded in 1925, it is the oldest opera theatre in Bulgaria outside Sofia and the second Bulgarian opera institution after the National Opera and Ballet in Sofia. Its theatre building, inaugurated in 1971, was the first building in Bulgaria constructed specifically for opera.

The company presents opera, ballet, operetta, musical theatre, children's productions and concerts. It also organises and hosts the Festival of Opera and Ballet Arts in Stara Zagora, one of the long-standing specialised forums for opera and ballet in Bulgaria.

== History ==
=== Origins and founding ===
Stara Zagora had organised musical activity before the creation of the opera company. A town orchestra was established in 1860, and the Caval Music Society was founded in 1897. In the following decades, military bands, school choirs, orchestras and musical-theatre groups contributed to the city's musical life.

The opera company was founded in 1925. Its first performance took place on 1 July 1925 with the opera Gergana by Georgi Atanasov. The first production was prepared by a group of local artists and enthusiasts, including the directors Georgi Bakalov and Mara Shopova, with conductor Atanas Kovachev.

In 1928 the theatre became the District Opera – Stara Zagora, and in 1931 it was renamed the South Bulgarian Regional Opera. In 1934 it became the Stara Zagora Municipal Opera.

=== State institution and repertoire expansion ===
In 1946 the opera was established as a state cultural institute under the name National Opera – Stara Zagora. After 1946 the orchestra and artistic ensembles gradually expanded with professionally trained musicians, allowing the repertoire to include more demanding opera and ballet titles.

The postwar repertoire included works from the Russian, Italian, French, German and Bulgarian operatic traditions. The orchestra's early postwar productions included Dargomyzhsky's Rusalka in 1946, Donizetti's Lucia di Lammermoor and Leoncavallo's Pagliacci in 1949, and Mozart's Die Entführung aus dem Serail in 1950.

=== Opera house building, fire and reopening ===
A new modern theatre building was inaugurated in 1971. It was the first building in Bulgaria constructed specifically for an opera theatre.

In 1991 the opera house was destroyed by fire, with scenery, costumes, stage equipment and interior elements lost in the disaster. The company continued to perform in other venues in the city during the years when the building was unusable. After restoration, the opera house reopened on 5 October 2010, the Day of Stara Zagora, with a performance of Bizet's Carmen.

== Orchestra ==
The orchestra of the Stara Zagora Opera developed from the musical activity of the Caval Music Society and the city's early orchestral traditions. In the first years after 1925 it was led by Aleksandar Georgiev and included musicians from the military brass band as well as amateurs from the local community.

After the opera became a state institution in 1946, the orchestra was gradually strengthened by professionally trained musicians. Its conductors in the first decades included Boris Fetvedzhiev, Simeon Fetvedzhiev, Dimitar Hristov and Yosko Yosifov. Romeo Raychev, director and chief conductor from 1942 to 1954, played an important role in consolidating the orchestra. Later figures associated with the orchestra included Anastas Anastasov, Iliya Iliev, Ruslan Raychev, Dimitar Dimitrov, Veselin Nenov, Mihail Popov, Ivan Dimov, Nedyalko Nedyalkov, Bozhidar Bonev, Krasimir Kashev, Stefan Linev, Dian Chobanov, Luciano Di Martino, Ivaylo Krinchev, Vladimir Boshnakov and Dimitar Kosev.

== Ballet ==
The ballet troupe of the Stara Zagora Opera was established as part of the theatre's postwar development. Its first choreographer with specialised training was Anna Vorobyova, who staged the company's first ballet production, Bayer's The Fairy Doll, in 1949.

In the 1950s Assen Manolov staged productions including The Fountain of Bakhchisarai, The Rivals, Invitation to the Dance and Bolero. Later productions included Ivan Dimov's Kardzhalii, staged by Teodorina Stoycheva, and Coppélia, staged by Dimitar Tsenov in 1971. Guest choreographers have included Vakhtang Chabukiani, who staged Laurencia in 1976 and Don Quixote in 1984.

In 2024 the Festival of Opera and Ballet Arts marked the 75th anniversary of the ballet troupe of the Stara Zagora State Opera.

== Guest artists and conductors ==
The State Opera Stara Zagora and its Festival of Opera and Ballet Arts have presented guest appearances by Bulgarian and international singers, conductors and stage artists. Historical festival materials list artists associated with the festival including Nicolai Ghiaurov, Nicola Ghiuselev, Nikola Nikolov, Kaludi Kaludov, Anna Tomowa-Sintow, Kamen Chanev, Stefka Mineva, Hristina Angelakova, Alexandrina Milcheva, Vesselina Kasarova and Tsvetelina Vassileva, as well as conductors including Asen Naydenov, Dimitar Manolov, Boris Hinchev, Rositsa Batalova, Nayden Todorov, Rossen Milanov and Emil Tabakov.

In later seasons, the opera has continued to invite internationally recognised artists for major productions and gala events. In 2017, the stadium production of Bizet's Carmen featured Vesselina Kasarova, Tsvetelina Vassileva, Kaludi Kaludov and Cyril Rovery. In 2018, Maria Guleghina appeared as Abigaille in Verdi's Nabucco at Beroe Stadium, with Ionuț Pascu as Nabucco and Ivaylo Krinchev conducting.

The theatre has also presented productions and concerts with artists such as Krassimira Stoyanova, Željko Lučić, Nadezhda Krasteva, Kiril Manolov and Ivan Dimitrov. In 2024 Stoyanova and Lučić appeared in Verdi's Otello, with Ivaylo Krinchev conducting. The centenary gala in 2025 included Krassimira Stoyanova, Nadezhda Krasteva, Kiril Manolov and Ivan Dimitrov as special guests. In 2025, José Cura worked with the theatre on Verdi's Rigoletto and was named principal guest conductor of the State Opera Stara Zagora for the following season.

== Festival of Opera and Ballet Arts ==
The Festival of Opera and Ballet Arts in Stara Zagora is among the oldest specialised opera and ballet forums in Bulgaria. It was created in 1967 under the name December Music Days and was renamed the Festival of Opera and Ballet Arts in 1973.

From 1974 to 1989 the National Review of Opera and Ballet Arts was held within the framework of the festival. The festival was interrupted in 1990, 2010 and 2013, affected by social changes after 1989 and by the consequences of the 1991 fire.

The festival has presented opera and ballet productions, guest performances, premieres, master classes, books, exhibitions and anniversary programmes. Its history includes guest appearances by opera theatres and ballet companies from Prague, Parma, Bratislava, Łódź, Gdańsk, Chișinău, Belgrade, Skopje, Moscow, Saint Petersburg, Budapest, Havana, Copenhagen and Paris.

== Recent activity ==
In recent years the opera has developed a wide programme including indoor productions, open-air performances and large-scale festival formats. Its activities include Music Evenings at the Ancient Forum and the Opera in the Stadium festival.

In 2025 the company celebrated its centenary with opera and ballet premieres, performances by the Children and Adolescents' Studio for Opera and Ballet, exhibitions, broadcasts and discussion forums. The first opera premiere of the centenary year was Verdi's Rigoletto, with a production team led by José Cura, director Ognyan Draganov, scenographer and costume designer Cătălin Ionescu-Arbore and choirmaster Mladen Stanev.
