= Speight Jenkins =

American journalist (1937–2026)

- Born: January 31, 1937; Dallas, Texas, U.S.
- Died: May 30, 2026 (aged 89); Seattle, Washington, U.S.
- Occupations: General Director, Journalist, music critic
- Spouse: Linda Sands
- Children: 2

Speight Jenkins Jr. (January 31, 1937 – May 30, 2026) was an American music administrator and classical music critic. He was the general director of Seattle Opera from 1983 to 2014.

== Early life and education ==
Jenkins was born on January 31, 1937 in Dallas, Texas, the son of Speight Jenkins Sr. and Sara Baird Jenkins. His parents took him to his first opera at the age of 7, and he fell immediately in love with the art form. His B.A. degree is from the University of Texas at Austin, and he graduated in 1961 from Columbia Law School.

== Career ==
Jenkins served in the U.S. Army as a member of the Judge Advocate General’s Corps, and afterwards became a music critic and journalist. He worked for seven years at Opera News as its news and reports editor, and later at the New York Post from 1973 to 1981 as music critic. He had been a host for U.S. television's Live from the Metropolitan Opera and a guest speaker on the Metropolitan Opera radio broadcasts.

== Tenure at Seattle Opera ==
In the early 1980s, Jenkins was a guest lecturer at Seattle Opera for the company's production of Richard Wagner's Der Ring des Nibelungen. His knowledge impressed the Seattle Opera board of trustees, such that they offered him the post of general director of the company and he began his tenure in that post with the company in 1983. His contract was extended for another ten years, and in 2003, he signed another 10-year extension to his contract.

At Seattle Opera he produced two complete cycles of Wagner's Ring, the first one directed by François Rochaix and the second one by Stephen Wadsworth. He also produced new productions of the other six frequently produced Wagner operas, as well as new productions of Prokofiev's War and Peace, Debussy's Pelléas et Mélisande, Dvorak's Rusalka, Bellini's Norma, Gluck's Orfeo ed Euridice and Iphigénie en Tauride, four Strauss operas, many by Verdi and Puccini, plus several contemporary works. In 2010 Seattle Opera commissioned and gave the world premiere of Amelia, by Daron Hagen.

Jenkins stepped down as General Director of Seattle Opera in August 2014, and was replaced by Aidan Lang.

== Other work ==
Jenkins wrote an art book, Pelleas + Melisande + Chihuly, and narrated a 4-CD commentary called Enjoying Wagner's Ring of the Nibelung with Speight Jenkins.

In 2011 he won an Opera Honor from the National Endowment for the Arts. In the same year he received an honorary doctorate from the New England Conservatory.

== Personal life and death ==
Jenkins and his wife, the former Linda Sands, had two children: Linda Leonie Jenkins and Speight Jenkins III.

Jenkins died in Seattle on May 30, 2026, at the age of 89.
