= Georgi Belev =

Bulgarian opera singer

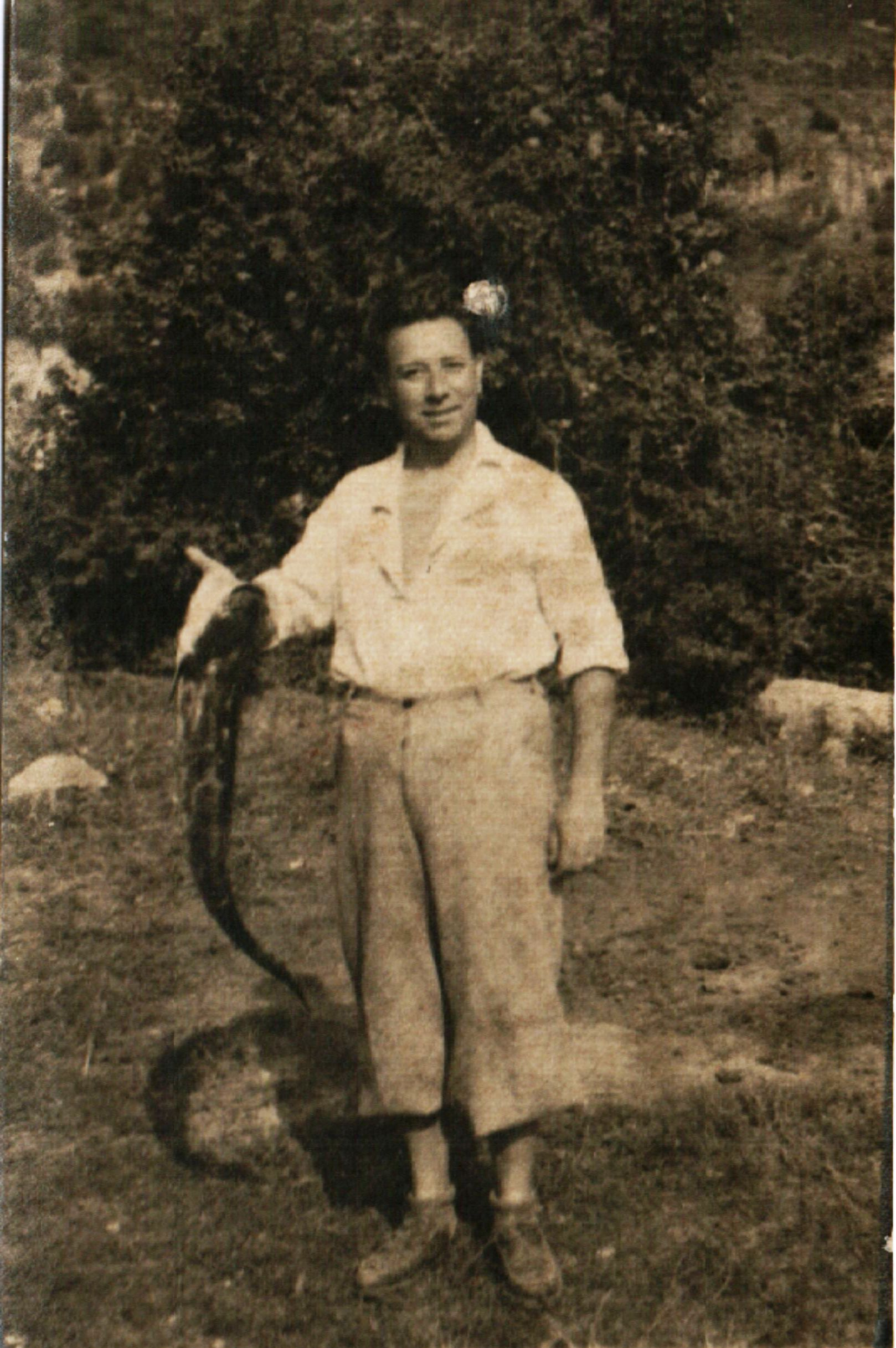
Georgi Belev

Georgi Belev (Bulgarian: Георги Белев) (13 April 1908 – 16 February 1966) was a Bulgarian opera singer.

== Life and career ==
Born on 13 April 1908 in Tsaribrod, Bulgaria (today Dimitrovgrad in Serbia), he moved to Sofia with his family after World War I. He graduated from high school and a railway institute. Belev took private vocal lessons from Sabcho Sabev from 1934. In 1937 he became first soloist of the Cooperative Operetta Theatre in Sofia, appearing in operettas by Kalman, Lehar, Strauss and Abraham.

His debut role with the Sofia Opera in 1938 was Alfredo in Verdi's La Traviata. From 1938 to 1942 he was a leading soloist with the Sofia Opera. His roles included Barinkay in The Gypsy Baron by Johann Strauss, Erik in Wagner's The Flying Dutchman, Walter von Stolzing in Die Meistersinger, Ferrando in Donizetti's La favorita, Florestan in Beethoven's Fidelio, Athanael in Massenet's Thais and de Grieux in Manon, Don José in Bizet's Carmen, Canio in Leoncavallo's Pagliacci, Turridu in Mascagni's Cavalleria rusticana and Radames in Verdi's Aida. He participated on 28 February 1940 in the world premiere of Jakov Gotovac's Ero s onoga svijeta (Ero the Joker), conducted by Asen Najdenov, in the role of Stojan Kolarov.

He left in 1942 for Salzburg to study with Muratti. He became the first Bulgarian to sing at the Salzburg Festival, and was invited as a guest soloist to the Bavarian State Opera in Munich. While performing there until 1944 he also toured in Germany and Austria. In 1944 he returned to the Sofia Opera and sang many leading tenor roles until 1954. New roles of a heavier character, included Dmitri in Mussorgsky's Boris Godunov, Cavaradossi in Puccini's Tosca, Hermann in Tchaikovsky's Pique Dame, and Sobinin in Glinka's Ivan Susanin. Lyubomir Pipkov composed the central role of his 1948 opera Momchil with his voice in mind. For the roles of Momchil and Manrico, he received the State Dimitrov Prize in 1949, and in 1952 the Order of the Chevalier of Romania.

From 1954, Belev appeared with the Stara Zagora Opera as a soloist and voice teacher, but performed also internationally in Poland, Romania, Yugoslavia and the USSR. In concert, Belev performed in Beethoven's Ninth Symphony, Verdi's Requiem, cantatas by Bach, and world premieres of works by Shostakovich, Prokofiev, Kabalevsky, Pipkov and Alexander Reichev, with "magnificent phrasing and diction".

He died in Sofia on 16 February 1966 at age 58.

== Recordings ==
Belev left a recording of Siegmund's song from Wagner's Die Walküre.

His voice was described as "truly phenomenal" with "power, baritone density, one hundred percent masculine timbre, and irrepressible fortissimo", and he was compared to Tino Pattiera, Francesco Merli, Franco Corelli and Mario del Monaco.
