= Pasha Hristova =

Bulgarian singer

Pasha Hristova Паша Христова
- Born: Parashkeva Hristova Stefanova; July 16, 1946; Sofia, Bulgaria
- Origin: Bulgaria
- Died: December 21, 1971 (aged 25) Sofia, Bulgaria
- Genre: Pop · Schlager · Jazz
- Occupation: Singer
- Instrument: Vocals
- Years active: 1965–1971
- Label: Balkanton

Parashkeva Hristova Stefanova (Bulgarian: Парашкева Христова Стефанова), known artistically as Pasha Hristova (Bulgarian: Паша Христова) (16 July 1946 - 21 December 1971) was a Bulgarian singer, best known for performing one of Bulgaria's most popular songs "Една българска роза" ("A Bulgarian Rose"). Some of the other songs she was famous for are "Повей, ветре" ("Blow, Oh Wind"), "Този дивен свят" ("This Wondrous World", a take on Czesław Niemen's "Dziwny jest ten świat") and "Янтра" ("Yantra"). Her brief but meteoric career took off in the late 1960s. In the short time between 1967 and 1971, she won a number of prestigious awards at Bulgarian and international music festivals. She died young in a plane crash in 1971, pregnant with her second child.

== Life and career ==
Pasha was born in Sofia in the residential district of Knyajevo to mother Lyubka and father Hristo. When she was five, her parents divorced. Her father got remarried to a woman named Tsvetana and received custody of Pasha, while her brother Ventsi remained with his mother. Pasha's second brother Krasimir is the child of her father's second marriage. Both Pasha and Krasimir were raised to call both mothers their own. They called them "mother Tsetska" and "mother Lyubka". Lyubka worked at the kindergarten they attended so both children were cared after by her there and by Tsetska at home. The children were also raised by their grandmother Parashkeva on their father's side. They called her "old mother". Pasha had a very close relationship with "old mother" (whom she was named after), who brought her up and enrolled her in violin lessons. While most people at the time called her Pepi (the usual diminutive for the names Petranka, Petya, Penka and the like), her grandmother, who was a great admirer of Pasha Angelina (a famous Soviet Stakhanovite of the Joseph Stalin era), gave her the nickname Pasha. Pasha was traumatized by her grandmother's death. They were very close and shared a bed. One morning she simply woke up in her grandmother's cold, stiff embrace.

In subsequent teenage years, she would quarrel with her father and would occasionally spend a few days at her mother's home after an argument. Acquaintances described her as a very shy and modest girl. Having completed her secondary education, she started work as a draftswoman at the Balkancar electrocar factory. She married an engineer named Vasil Ivanov and they had a son Milen together. They drifted apart however and eventually separated (without an official divorce), after which Pasha took custody of the child.

At that same time, Pasha auditioned for The Stage Singers School for the Bulgarian National Radio. She was accepted for her remarkable voice and despite a strong lisp that was subsequently treated surgically. With the help of her teacher, she found work as a soloist (after being denied a position in the Sofia Orchestra) in the Labour Corps Ensemble. Her first great success was at the 1967 Sochi festival in the Soviet Union, where she won first prize and a gold medal. In 1968 she was accepted into the Sofia Orchestra, and she worked with them for the rest of her career. The then-conductor and leader of the band, Nikolay "Bebo" Kuyumdzhiev, was soon replaced by Nikolay "Fucho" Arabadzhiev, with whom Pasha collaborated productively. He was a conductor, composer, pianist and clarinetist. They fell deeply in love and basically lived in a common law marriage until their deaths. She would spend the following years touring Bulgaria and various other countries, primarily in what was then the Soviet bloc. In 1970 she won third prize at the Golden Stag Festival in Braşov, Romania, first prize for the song "Яворова пролет" ("Yavor Spring", yavor being a word for the sycamore tree and also a Bulgarian male name) (music by Svetozar Rusinov) in the radio competition "Spring", and at the all-Bulgarian Golden Orpheus Festival, the Grand Prize was awarded to "Повей, ветре" and first prize to "Една българска роза" (music by Dimitar Valchev), both performed by Pasha Hristova. In 1971, her performance of "Този дивен свят" (A Bulgarian adaptation of "Dziwny jest ten świat") won first prize at the Sopot International Song Festival in Poland. Finally, her song "Бяла песен" ("White Song") won the Bulgarian "Melody of the year" television contest in 1972, shortly after her death.

== Death ==
In 1971, she was due for a flight to Algeria where she would have toured with the Sofia Orchestra and other colleagues, including well-known stage singers Mariya Neykova, Boris Gudjunov and folk music singer Yanka Rupkina. As the plane was taking off, it rapidly lost altitude, hit the ground headfirst, broke in half and its front exploded and went up in flames. Pasha and Nikolay Arabadzhiev were in the front seats and died almost immediately (all in all 30 people were killed, including the entire crew). When Pasha died, she was carrying her second child, from Arabadzhiev. After being identified, Pasha was buried at Central Sofia Cemetery, in the catholic parcel.

Little if any documentation of the details behind the cause of the crash has been released. The investigation into the matter was quickly placed under wraps. What is certain is that the plane in question had just come out of an extensive overhaul that took months to finish. An irresponsible technical error was made during the overhaul: the cables for the ailerons were incorrectly connected (left cable to right aileron and vice versa). Thus, when the pilots tried to straighten the plane, they ended up tilting it further, resulting in a crash at an extremely low altitude during take-off. According to an official report (made public only in 2001, and thanks to the efforts of a journalist from the Bulgarian newspaper "24 hours"), lack of expertise was said to be the culprit - the procedure was carried out by technicians lacking practical experience and using two separate design plans.

According to Ani Nemova, there were attacks on her father Todor Yanakiev, the co-pilot originally assigned to that flight. She states that there were a total of three IL-18 planes that were sabotaged as a scare tactic to prevent Yanakiev from speaking to Todor Zhivkov about smuggling operations on freighters to Russia - one in Zürich, one in Beli Iskar, and one in Sofia. On all three occasions Todor Yanakiev was taken off the plane at the last minute. He was warned, however, that the next time that would happen, he would not be saved.

Actor Vasil Draganov believes that there was a hit out on his grandfather of the same name, who was the actual co-pilot on the fateful flight. The older Draganov is said to have had inside information on weapons being smuggled to third-world countries. Singer Boris Gudzhunov, a colleague of Pasha, has also said in subsequent interviews that according to his knowledge, the co-pilot was a target.

Another colleague and perhaps best friend of Pasha, singer-songwriter Mariya Neikova, barely made it out alive. In panic, she quickly made a dash for safety, tearing one of her calves badly (which had gotten pierced by a metal rod in the crash), fled and jumped from a great height (around 10 meters). She survived but was severely injured. She had fractured her ribs and some of her vertebrae, and had over 40 stitches done on her legs. It was her birthday. For many years after the disaster, she did not celebrate her birthday, feeling guilt for having survived only because of switching seats with Pasha. In addition to this, Maria's husband was also among the ones who died in the crash.

== Musical style and voice ==
Pasha Hristova had a very versatile voice and worked in different genres. Some of her songs can be described as ballads or chansons, many others are jazz and contemporary rock and roll, and she has even recorded some Bulgarian folk songs. As was common among Bulgarian singers at the time, a large part of her repertoire consisted of translations or broad adaptations of foreign originals.

She was capable of alternating between the powerful and dramatic ("a voice that sweeps everything away") and the gentle and lyrical.

One of her colleagues, singer Mimi Ivanova, has commented that despite being a shy and delicate person in everyday life, Pasha was "a volcano on stage".

== Discography (incomplete) ==
=== Singles and EPs ===
- 1969: "Аз, ти и розите" (You, Me and the Roses) (original Italian song "Io Tu e le Rose" by Orietta Berti Bulgarian lyrics by Milcho Spasov) / "Щастливи заедно" (Happy Together) (a Bulgarian adaptation of The Turtles' 1967 song Happy Together)
- 1970: "Нека този миг да спре" (May This Moment Stop) (a Bulgarian adaptation of Dusty Springfield's 1968 song "I Close My Eyes and Count to Ten", Bulgarian lyrics by Milcho Spasov). Featuring also "Цигани" (Gypsies) (Bulgarian lyrics by Bogomil Gudev), "Знай" (Know) (Bulgarian lyrics by Pasha Hristova) and "Остани" (Stay) (music by Nikolay Arabadzhiev, lyrics by Dimitar Vasilev)
- 1971: "Този дивен свят" (This Wondrous World) (music and original lyrics by Czesław Niemen, Bulgarian lyrics by Bogomil Gudev) / "Когато си отидеш" (When You Go) (Bulgarian lyrics by Bogomil Gudev)

=== Albums ===
- 1972: "Edna balgarska roza" (A Bulgarian Rose, post-mortem)

==== Track listing ====
1. "Edna balgarska roza" (A Bulgarian Rose) (music by Dimitar Valchev, lyrics by Nayden Valchev)
2. "Ostani" (Stay) (music by Nikolay Arabadzhiev, lyrics by Dimitar Vasilev)
3. "Edna godina lyubov" (A Year of Love) (a Bulgarian-language version of Italian singer Mina's "Un anno d'amore")
4. "Tozi diven svyat" (This Wonderful World) (music and original lyrics by Czesław Niemen, Bulgarian lyrics by Bogomil Gudev)
5. "Popaten vyatar" (Sailing with the Wind) (music by Genko Genkov, lyrics by Milcho Spasov)
6. "Znay" (I Want You To Know) (original unspecified, Bulgarian lyrics by Pasha Hristova)
7. "Shtastlivi zaedno" (Happy Together) (a Bulgarian-language version of The Turtles' 1967 song Happy Together)
8. "Povei, vetre" (Blow, oh Wind) (music by Yosif Tsankov, lyrics by Dimitar Vasilev)
9. "Spri, vreme" (Stop, Time) (music by Alexander Yosifov, lyrics by Anna Georgieva)
10. "Kogato imash" (When You Have) (a Bulgarian-language version of Northern Irish singer Clodagh Rodgers' "Come Back and Shake Me", Bulgarian lyrics by Bogomil Gudev)
11. "Cyala nosht" (The Whole Night) (original unspecified, Bulgarian lyrics by Dimitar Kerelezov)
12. "Byala pesen" (A White Song) (music by Dimitar Valchev, lyrics by Petar Karaangov)
13. "Neka tozi mig da spre" (Let This Moment Stop) (a Bulgarian language version of Dusty Springfield's 1968 song "I Close My Eyes and Count to Ten", Bulgarian lyrics by Milcho Spasov).
14. "Az, ti i rozite" (You, Me and the Roses) (a Bulgarian-language version of Italian singer Orietta Berti's Io, tu e le rose, Bulgarian lyrics by Milcho Spasov)

== Sources ==
- Музикални следи (документална поредица): Паша Христова. ТВ България. (2006) (in Bulgarian)
- 60 червени рози за Паша. В. Стандарт, 16 Юли 2006 (in Bulgarian)
- Pasha Hristova bio (in Bulgarian)
