= Bantcho Bantchevsky =

Bulgarian-born American musician

- Born: 5 May 1906; Lovech, Bulgaria
- Died: 23 January 1988 (aged 81); Metropolitan Opera House, New York City
- Occupations: Operatic singer, teacher, translator

Bantcho Bantchevsky (Bulgarian: Банчо Банчевски; also spelled Banchevsky or Banchevski; 5 May 1906 – 23 January 1988) was a Bulgarian-born American singer, singing coach, and translator. He died by suicide at the Metropolitan Opera in New York City during a nationally broadcast performance.

== Life ==
Bantchevsky was born in Lovech, Bulgaria, and had little formal musical training in his youth. Village cultural life, which centered on traditional singing and dancing, inspired him to attend the Sofia Conservatory, where he learned to play the flute and piano and studied opera.

Bantchevsky found a career for himself performing on Rakovska, a street in Sofia, known as "Bulgaria's Broadway", and became well known during the 1930s; however, he chose to leave Bulgaria. He spent the 1940s finding work around Europe, singing opera in Czechoslovakia and Vienna, and becoming a member of the Don Cossack Choir Serge Jaroff. He also appeared in films and plays in Berlin, including a small part in a performance of Macbeth. Early in the 1950s, he emigrated to the United States.

Bantchevsky found it difficult to gain stage work in New York, as he found himself competing against younger, native-born performers. He turned instead to coaching, also writing political satire for Radio Free Europe. A polyglot, he spoke German, French, Italian, and Russian in addition to English and his native Bulgarian. He also translated material for visiting opera singers. In this way he met singers such as Anna Tomowa-Sintow and Luciano Pavarotti. He also sang in the choir of New York's Bulgarian Orthodox Church.

Bantchevsky was a great fan of the opera, and was a regular at the Metropolitan. He usually sat in the orchestra seats, using tickets which he had been given by friends who worked in the company.

At the time of his death, Bantchevsky lived alone. He was survived by two children and four grandchildren, who lived in Europe.

== Death ==
Bantchevsky had been in failing health for some time, and friends noticed that he was less cheerful than usual. Three weeks before his death, he suffered a minor heart attack, but checked out of the hospital after a week.

On 23 January 1988, Bantchevsky attended a Saturday matinée performance of Giuseppe Verdi's Macbeth; unusually, he chose to sit in the balcony seats. Witnesses later recalled that he caused some disturbances not long after the performance began.

At around 3:30 in the afternoon, during the intermission between the second and third acts, Bantchevsky went to the balcony railing and sat down on it. When an usher approached and requested that he remove himself, he tipped over backwards and fell into the orchestra seats. His head hit on another railing on the way down, and he fell into an aisle with part of a broken seat on top of him. He was pronounced dead by the time the police arrived; the medical examiner later ruled his death a suicide. The audience was kept waiting for over an hour before being informed of what had happened, and the remainder of the performance was canceled.

As it was a Saturday afternoon, the opera was being broadcast worldwide as part of the Metropolitan's broadcast series. Peter Allen was later commended by many observers for keeping up an impressive, nearly entirely improvised, string of commentary during the extended intermission.
