= Rumyana =

Bulgarian singer (1965–1999)

- Born: Rumyana Dineva Naydenova; December 12, 1965; Kameno, Bulgaria
- Origin: Bulgaria
- Died: July 30, 1999 (aged 33) Blatets, Bulgaria
- Genres: pop-folk, chalga, folk music
- Occupation: Singer
- Years active: 1994–1999
- Website: rumyana-star.alle.bg

Rumiana Dineva Naydenova (12 December 1965 – 30 July 1999), was a Bulgarian pop-folk and folk singer.

== Life ==
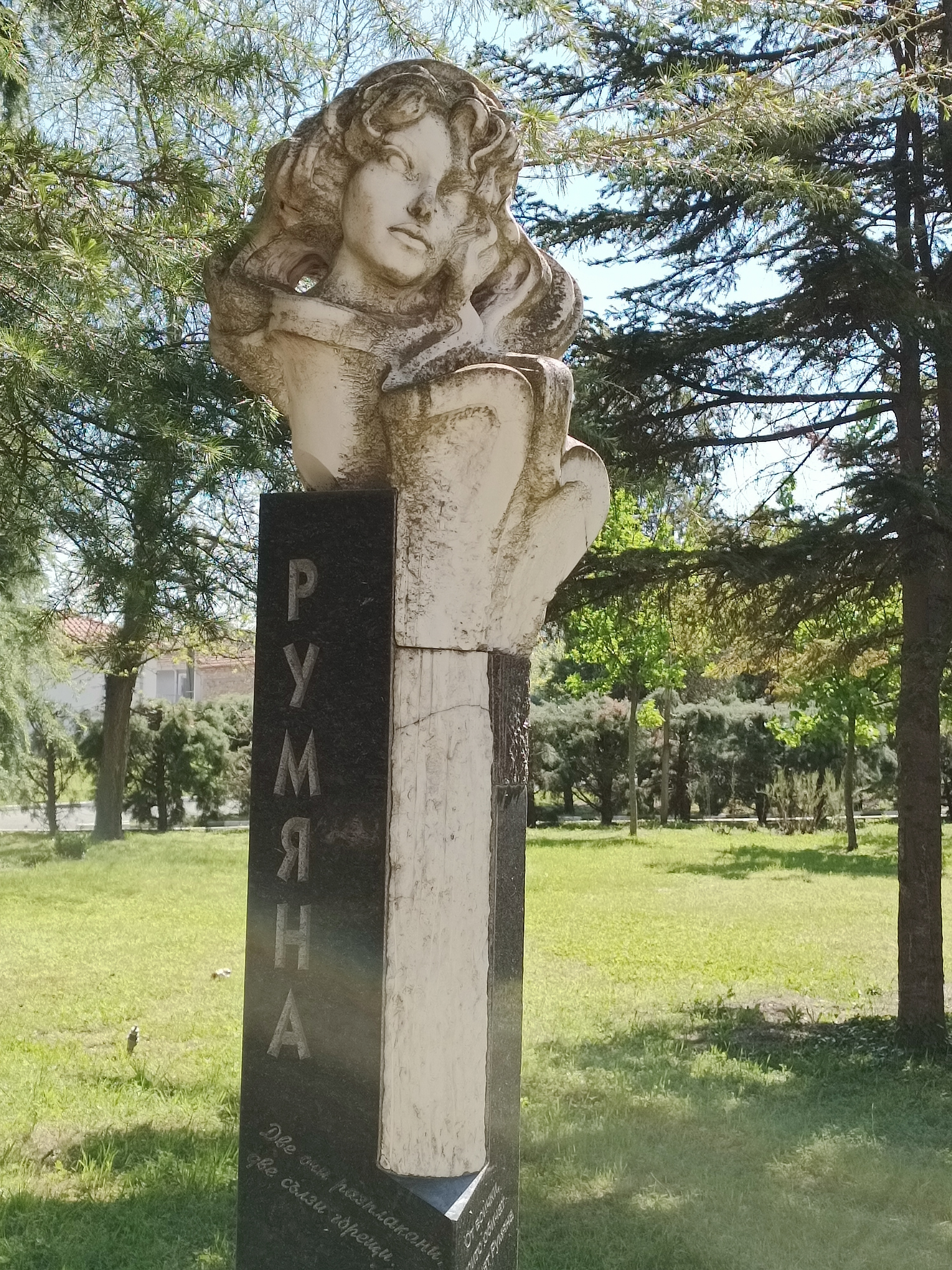
Monument to the singer Rumyana in her native city of Kameno

She became famous with the songs "Two Eyes Cry", "Bells Ring", "Only With You", "Without You", "Hammer, Hammer" and others. She graduated from the Kotel School of Music with a first specialization in kaval and a second specialization in singing. She also played the piano, and worked as a music teacher in Antonovo. She had two children – Ilian and Mariana. Rumyana died in a serious car accident near the village of Blatets in Sliven. In 2002, a monument of the singer was built in her hometown, in her memory.

== Career ==
She began her singing career as a soloist with the Strandzha Orchestra. Her first album was released in 1994 and was titled "Songs from Strandzha". In 1995, on the album "I love to live", she recorded the ballad "Two eyes cry", which became a successful brand of the singer. The music and lyrics of the song were recorded at the same time, at a time when she was having a hard time separating from her husband Rusi Androlov. For these two albums, the singer worked with the company Sliven. Her true success began when she signed a contract with Milena Records, with which she released the albums "Prayer for Love" (1996), "Only with You" (1997), "I Love to Live" (1997), "Eternal Love" (1998), "You Dance" (1999) and "Day After Day" (1999). The singer's discography contains 8 solo albums, the last one was released posthumously.

== Death ==
Rumyana died in a car accident, in the village of Blatets, Bulgaria, and her children were seriously injured and then healed a few days after their mother's death.

== Discography ==
- Strandzha Songs (1994)
- I like to live (1994)
- Prayer for Love (1996)
- Only with You (1997)
- I like to live (1997)
- Eternal Love (1998)
- The dance is winding (1999)
- Day after day (1999) posthumously released

== Filmography ==
- Прочу се врачка от Странджа (1995)
- Обичам да живея (1995)
- Две очи разплакани (1998)
- Rumyana – Film (2000)
- Вечната обич (2000)
- Балади (2000)
- Балади DVD (2007)
- Хоро се вие (2008)

== Bibliography ==
- Rumyana – I like to live (2020)

== Awards ==
- 1998 – Audience Award – Hit Cocktail
- 1998 – Video of the Year "Come Back, Big" – New Folk Magazine Annual Awards
- 1998 – Eternal Love Album of the Year – New Folk Magazine Annual Awards
- 1999 – Outstanding Achievements – New Folk Magazine Annual Awards
