= Penka Toromanova =

Bulgarian operatic soprano

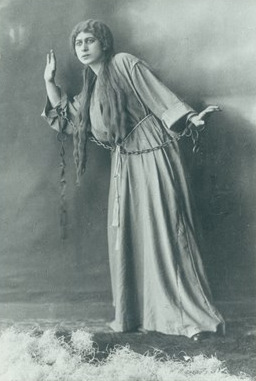
- Penka Toromanova in the role of Margarita in "Faust"
- Born: March 26, 1892; Varna, Bulgaria
- Died: October 9, 1961 (aged 69); Sofia, Bulgaria

Penka Georgieva Toromanova-Radeva, better known as Penka Toromanova was a Bulgarian opera singer (soprano) and a vocal pedagogue.

== Biography ==
Penka Toromanova was born in 1892 in Varna. From 1909 to 1913 she studied in the Geneva Conservatory among influential teachers in the field. After she graduated in Bulgaria, she made her debut on scene on 16 February 1914, in Il Trovatore by Giuseppe Verdi.

In 1915, Toromanova returned to Geneva for postgraduate study. When she came back to Bulgaria, she joined the troupe of the Bulgarian National Opera. Alongside that, she also performed on other stages in Bulgaria and abroad.

Alongside her career in opera, she became a pedagogue and taught at a public musical school as a vocal pedagogue. Among her most famous students were Elisaveta Yovovich, Sabcho Sabchev, Mimi Balkanska, and others.

Between 1920 and 1930, she worked as an assistant teacher on vocals in the Musical University in Berlin.
