= Valya (singer) =

Bulgarian folk singer (born 1978)

I propose moving this article to Valia (singer). The subject's official website and current professional branding use "Valia" (e.g., https://valiamusic.com). "Valya" reflects an older transliteration, while "Valia" is the preferred Latin spelling used in her official materials. A redirect from Valya (singer) should be kept, as the old spelling is still widely known.

Valentina Ivanova Kaneva (Bulgarian: Валентина Иванова Канева), best known as Valya (Валя) (born 23 April 1978), is a Bulgarian pop-folk singer. Valya was born in Haskovo.

== Albums ==
- 2001–"I want everything"
- 2002–"My World"
- 2005–"Something Intimate"

== Awards ==
- 2000– Trakia Folk Award for "Best Debut"
- 2002– Annual awards of the magazine "New Folk"- Award for "Best Debut"
- 2003– Trakia Folk- "Best Song Arrangement"- for the album "What do you see in Me"
- 2005– Pirin Folk- First Prize for "Best Song"- "New Spring"
- 2008– University Troubadours "Audience Award"

== Concerts Abroad ==
- USA

== Hits ==
- "100 Calls"
- "100 Bouquet"
- "I will burn"
- "Mirror"
- "You are the past for Me"
- "Sea Wall"
- "I, not I"
- "Let's Dance"
- "Good Night"
- "Lonely Body"
- "Boring"
- "Mood"
- "Something Intimate"
- "My Destiny"
