= Maria Mitzeva =

Bulgarian born American pop singer (born 1938)

Maria Mitzeva Мария Мицева
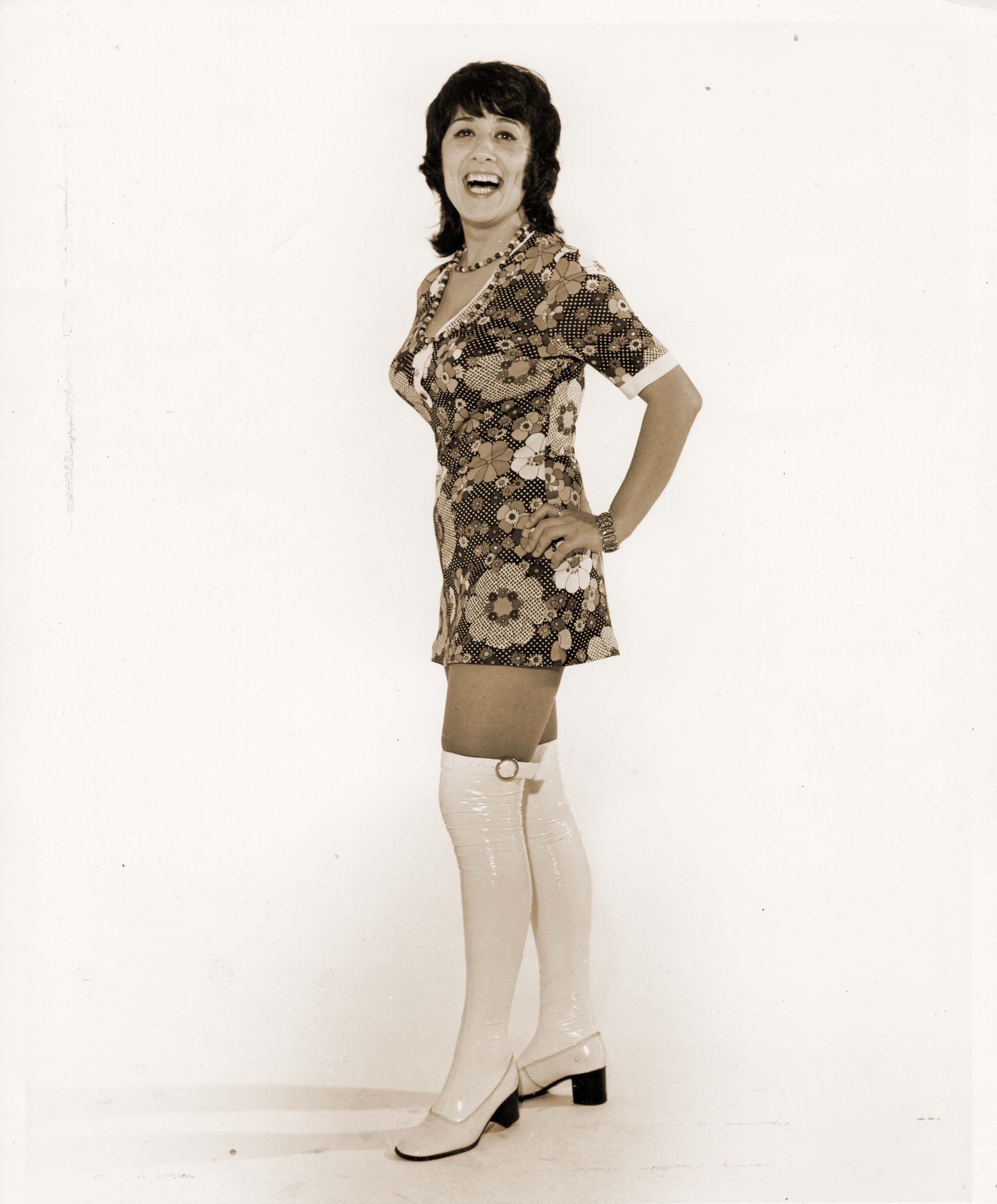

Background information
- Born: Maria Mitzeva; October 20, 1938 (age 88); Plovdiv, Bulgaria
- Genre: Pop
- Occupation: Singer
- Website: mariamitzeva.com

Maria Mitzeva (Bulgarian: Мария Мицева; born October 20, 1938, in Plovdiv, Bulgaria) is a Bulgarian born American pop singer.

== Early life ==
Mitzeva graduated in 1957 from the National School of Music Sofia, Bulgaria.

== Career ==
Mitzeva recorded and performed with The Bulgarian National Radio and Television Orchestra, German Radio and Television, Austrian Television, Russian Radio and Television. She moved to the United States in 1970. She performed extensively in North America and has been called by the press "the female Tom Jones"

== Awards ==
- Gold medal and first place at The World Olympiad of Pop Singers and Songs 1969 Athens, Greece
- Gold Medal of Radio Barcelona 1969
- Golden Lowe Award in 1967 Leipzig, Germany
- The Golden Orpheus Festival 1968, Sunny Beach, Bulgaria.

== Personal life ==
She married producer, composer and conductor Michael-Mihran Vartan in 1969. They reside in Palm Desert, California.
