= Maria Christova =

Russian soprano

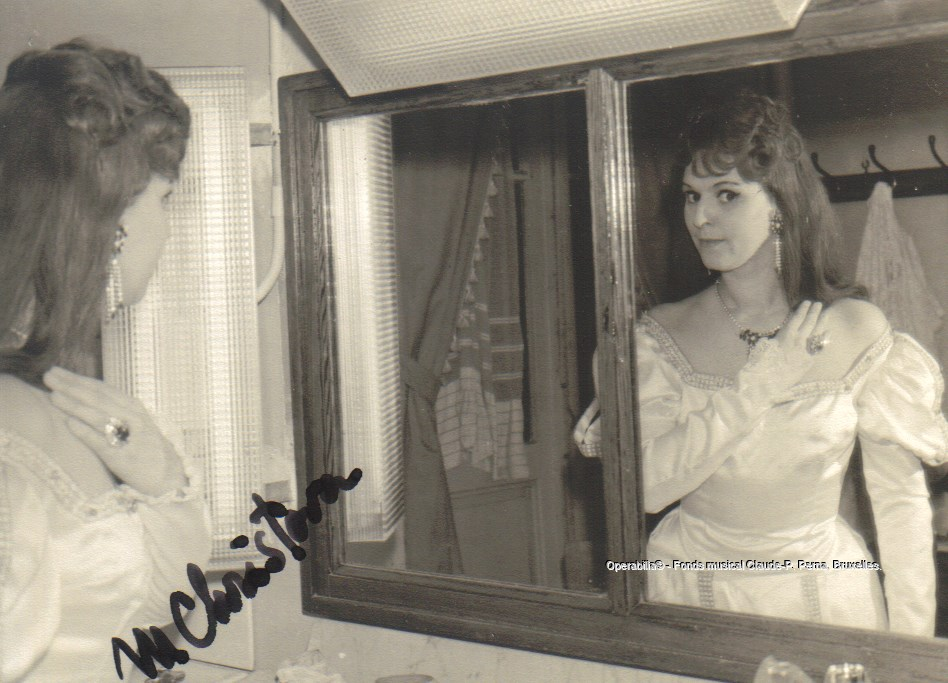

Maria Christova was a Bulgarian lyric soprano and also, a noted concert soloist (born 15 October 1937, died 17 May 2022).

She won the Toulouse International Singing Competition in 1961. She subsequently was a guest artist in Bulgaria, Austria, Switzerland, Germany and France. In the 1970s, she was a member of the company at the Royal Flemish Opera in Antwerp, Belgium, where she performed in an ample variety of roles such as Pamina in The Magic Flute, the Countess in The Marriage of Figaro, Violetta in La Traviata, Nabucco (role unconfirmed), Tatyana in Eugene Onegin, Dargomijski in Rusalka, Mimi and Musetta in La Bohème, Liu in Turandot, Floria Tosca, as well as several roles in Hungarian and Viennese operetta, such as Victoria in Victoria and her Hussar, Lisa in The Land of Smiles, Maria-Anna Elisa in Paganini, the title role of Countess Maritza, and Rosalinde in Die Fledermaus, also known as The Bat or The Flittermouse. Maria Christova was also appreciated at the Royal Opera at Ghent (Belgium) during the 1968–1969 season, and from 1976 to 1980. There, she premiered Donizetti's opera Lucrezia Borgia in 1969. By the time she started performing in Belgium, her voice was past her prime.

Throughout her career and in later life, she fostered young talents, was a frequent radio guest speaker, notably on Bulgarian channels, and organised concerts and recitals in Antwerp, where she was residing until her death. She has notably recorded for Nonesuch Records and Terpsichore, and she leaves a radio recording legacy. Maria Christova died at Antwerp on 17 May 2022.

== Recordings (selection) ==
- A Heritage of Folk Song from Old Russia (Nonesuch H-72010, 1966)
- Slavish Recital (Terpsichore 1982 018)
- Peter Tchaikovsky: Songs (Terpsichore – 1982 039)
