= Boris Godjunov =

Bulgarian singer

Boris Gudjunov
- Борис Гуджунов
- Born: May 22, 1941; Pazardzhik, Bulgaria
- Died: June 14, 2015 (aged 74)
- Education: Krastyo Sarafov National Academy for Theatre and Film Arts

Boris Gudjunov (Bulgarian: Борис Гуджунов; 22 May 1941 – 14 June 2015) was a Bulgarian singer and symbol of the Bulgarian popular music during the People's Republic of Bulgaria.

== Career ==
He was born in Pazardjik, Bulgaria. Godjunov finished his education in Krastyo Sarafov National Academy for Theatre and Film Arts (VITIS "Krastio Sarafov" or (ВИТИЗ "Кръстю Сарафов") and appeared frequently in the Bulgarian National Radio.

He also gained international fame by singing in tours in the Soviet Union, Poland, Serbia, Turkey, Germany, Italy, Cuba, Algeria and Japan.

He was one of the few survivors of a plane crash on December 21, 1971, a fatal air disaster that killed prominent Bulgarian singer Pasha Hristova. For a long period of time following the accident, Godjunov retreated from public eye.

In the 1990s, he returned to the limelight in partnership with Borislav Grancharov and Boyan Ivanov to form the trio "Bo Bo Bo" (in Bulgarian: Бо Бо Бо).

In 1998, he was awarded the Golden Orpheus Award for overall creativity.

== Songs ==
- "Hope" (in Bulgarian Надежда)
- "The world is full with girls" (in Bulgarian С момичета е пълен света)
