= Mimi Balkanska =

Bulgarian opera singer (1902–1984)

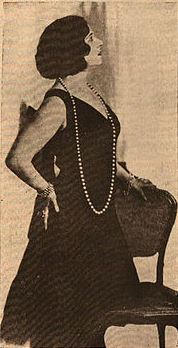
- Mimi Balkanska, In the role of Odet, act III
- Born: July 22, 1902
- Died: May 22, 1984 (aged 81)
- Known for: Bulgarian Opera Singer, Hero of Socialist Labor

Mimi Mihaylova Balkanska (1902–1984) was a Bulgarian opera singer. Her home in Sofia is national heritage and a Museum.

== Biography ==
Balkanska was born on 22 July 1902 in the Bulgarian town Ruse. She is the granddaughter of Nikola Balkanski, a cousin of Georgi Sava Rakovski. After her father passed away in 1907, her entire family moved to the capital - Sofia. From 1914 to 1917 she took piano lessons with Heinrich Wiesner and sang with Penka Toromanova, a famous opera singer.

Mimi later specialized in singing in Berlin and Vienna. She married twice. Her first husband was the trainer Ivan Tsatschev.

On 23 May 1975 she was awarded with the honorary award of Socialist labor and named a Hero of Socialist Labour. She received other awards like "Red Flag of Labor" during 1959 and the "Kiril and Metodii" culture award.

Balkanska also received numerous other Soviet and National awards like "best artist" in 1949, "national artist" in 1950 and "Dimitrovska nagrada" in 1950.

== Career ==
=== Occupation ===
She started her career in 1916, taking part in the first ever contest for artists, choristers and orchestrates in the National Opera and Ballet of Bulgaria. She was 14 years old at the time. At the age of 17 years old, she sang in the Opera Theater "Renaissance"

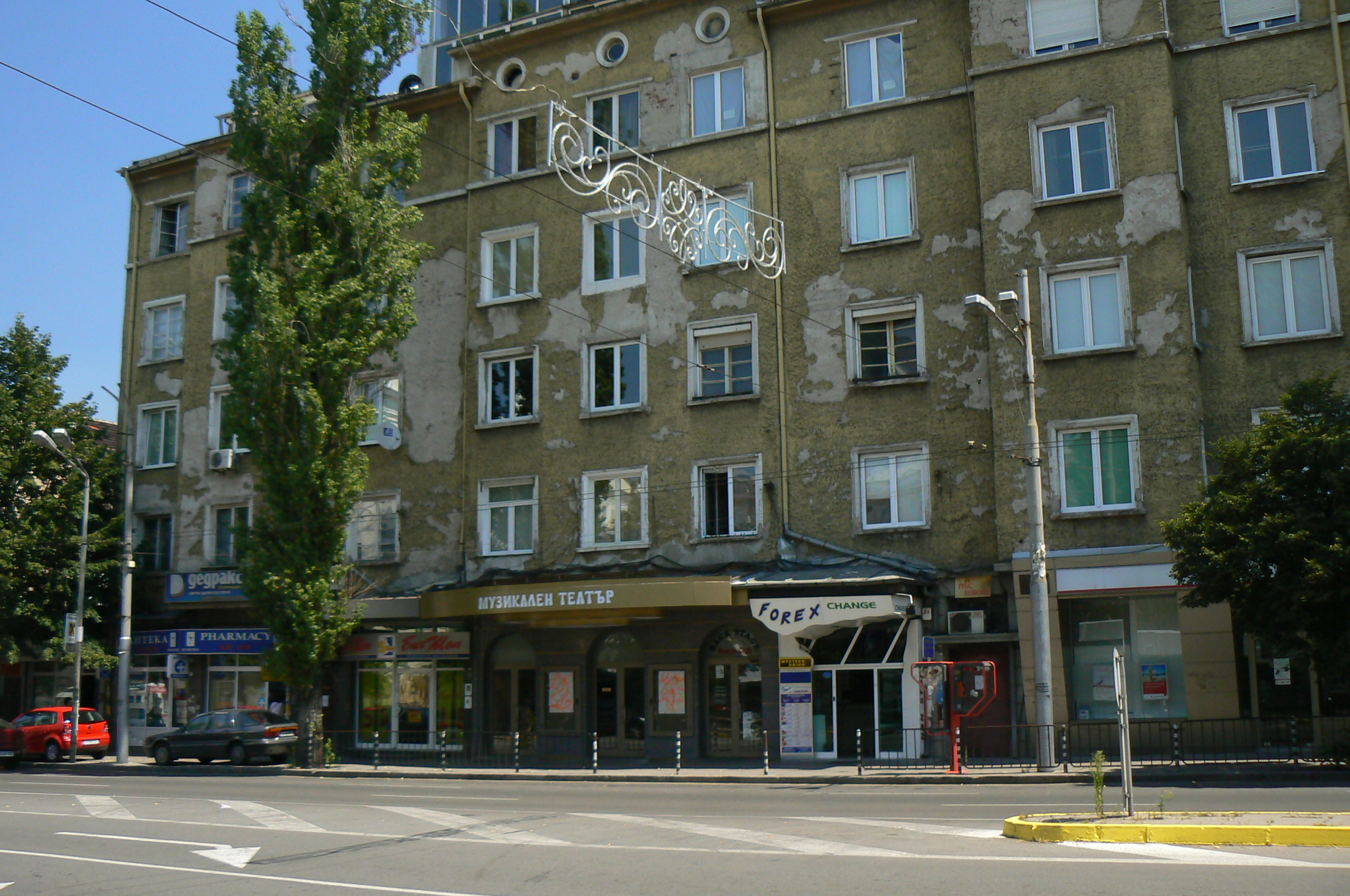
The Sofia Musical Theater "Stefan Makedonski"

She became a co-founder of the Sofia Musical Theater "Stefan Makedonski" in Sofia along with other famous artists at the time. It remains as the only theater in Sofia that has been playing musicals for more than 90 years.

Balkanska is also one of the co-founders and the director of the Art Opera House in Sofia from 1942 to 1946. Afterwards, from 1948 until 1963, she worked in the National Musical Theater in Sofia. She still remains as one of the most popular opera singers in Bulgaria.

Nowadays, there are theater spectacles in her honor - Mimi Balkanska, the Queen of the Opera.

=== Major Operetta roles ===
- Sylva Varescu, The Csardas Princess, an operetta by the Hungarian composer Emmerich Kálmán.
- Liza and Countess Maritsa, in Countess Maritsa by the Hungarian composer Emmerich Kálmán.
- Ana Glavari in the Merry Widdow Franz Lehár an Austro-Hungarian composer.
- Crystel, in The Bird Seller by Carl Zeller.

=== Filmography ===
- "Vesela Bulgaria" - A young lady (Premiered 19 December 1928)
- Neveroyatna Istoriya, (1964)
