= Alexander Raytchev =

Bulgarian classical pianist und composer (born 1975)

- Born: March 15, 1975 (age 51); Sofia, Bulgaria
- Occupations: Classical Pianist and Composer
- Instrument: Piano

Alexander Alexandrov Raytchev (Bulgarian: Александър Александров Райчев, born 15 March 1975 in Sofia, Bulgaria) is a Bulgarian classical pianist und composer who lives in Germany.

== Biography ==
The pianist and composer Alexander Raytchev comes from a multigenerational family of artists. His father is the composer Alexandar Ivanow Raytchev (born 11 April 1922 in Lom; died 2003 in Sofia), his mother Milena Atanassova is actress at the Ivan Vazov National Theatre in Sofia.

Alexander Raytchev received his first piano lesson at the age of five. Six years later, he won the national competition PROWADIA, was shortly afterwards invited as a composer at Baden-Baden's Brahms Symposium and was honored in Japan for his compositions. After his secondary studies in 1993, Alexander Raytchev studied piano and composition at the University of Music Trossingen with Johannes van Beek in parallel with Jowtsho Kruschev in Sofia. He then successfully completed a Concert Exam with Arie Vardi and Bernd Goetzke at the Hochschule für Musik und Theater Hannover.

He was awarded numerous prizes, including the Students' Competition in Hanover, and won the "Performance of the Year" contest with the Sofia Radio Orchestra. In 2000, Alexander Raytchev was appointed "Musician of the Year" in Bulgaria. He recorded on CD Sergei Rachmaninov's Concerto No. 3 D minor and the Rhapsody on a Theme of Paganini with Plovdiv Philharmonic Orchestra under the baton of Nayden Todorov for the American label Music Minus One.

He is keen on projects on literature and music, for example with the actor Ulrich Tukur. Since 2004, Alexander Raytchev is the Sofia Symphonic Orchestra's first soloist guest.

The pianist's adoptive city is Hamburg. He here prepares for his international tours to the US and Japan. In addition, his sphere of influence extends from multimedia concerts for the Planetarium Hamburg, a symbiosis of classical music and picture projections, to active teaching. He is amongst other things, part of various chamber music ensembles with singers from the Staatsoper Hannover and musicians of the Hamburg Symphony Orchestra.
