= Tsvetelina =

Tzvetelina Цветелина
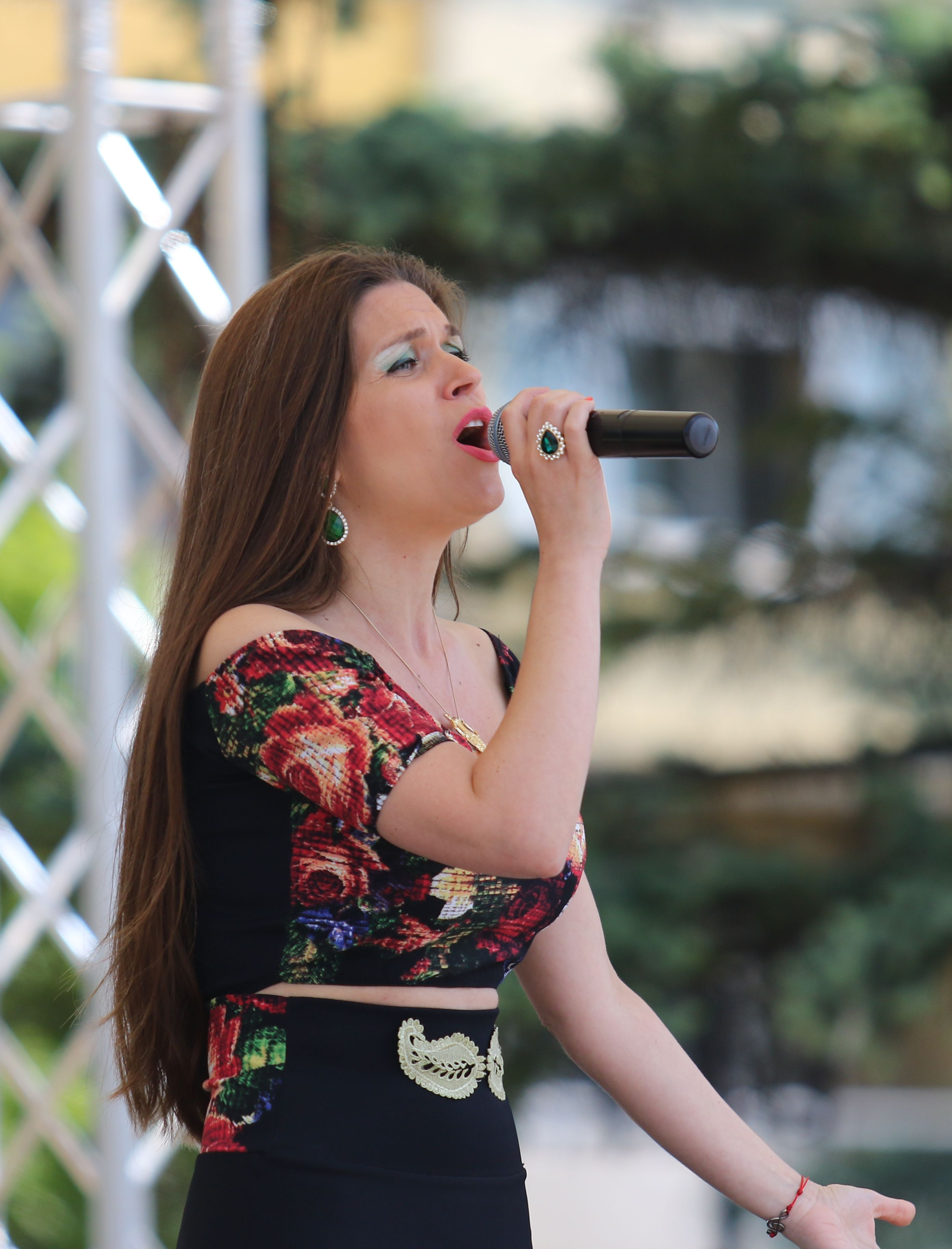

Background information
- Born: Tzvetelina Georgieva Dobreva (Цветелина Георгиева Добрева); July 31, 1976 (age 49); Petrich, Bulgaria
- Genres: Pop-folk, pop
- Occupation: Singer
- Years active: 1996-present
- Labels: Payner, Rhythm studio
- Website: www.tzvetelina-bg.com

Tzvetelina Dobreva (Bulgarian Cyrillic: Цветелина Добрева) (born July 31, 1976), best known by her stage name Tzvetelina (Цветелина), is a Bulgarian pop-folk singer.

== Biography ==
She was born in Petrich, Bulgaria, but her family soon moved to Varna, where she spent most of her childhood. After grade seven, Tzvetelina attended and graduated from a music high school in Razgrad. She has two older sisters, Valya and Ekstra Nina, as well as two brothers - Yanek and Dobromir. Aside from her occupation, Tzvetelina's hobbies include skiing and figure skating. On 1 May 2011, she published her first book with positive verses under the title "Fabric for dreamers" (Bulgarian: "Фабрика за мечтатели"), having been inspired by John Kehoe's techniques.
