= Dina Stancheva =

Bulgarian architect (1925–2010)

- Born: Dina Nikolva Stancheva; 18 November 1925; Nova Zagora, Bulgaria
- Died: 2 January 2010 (aged 84)
- Other name: Bulgarian: ДИНА Николова Станчева
- Occupation: architect
- Years active: 1952–1994

Dina Nikolova Stancheva (Bulgarian: Дина Николова Станчева; 18 November 1925 – 2 January 2010) was a Bulgarian architect who received multiple awards for her designs. She was honored with the Koliu Ficheto award in 1968, the Red Banner of Labor Award in 1977, and received the Gold Badge of the Bulgarian Union of Architects in 1985.

== Biography ==
Dina Nikolva Stancheva was born on 18 November 1925 in Nova Zagora, Bulgaria. She grew up in Sofia, studying at the Sofia Art Academy and went on for her university studies in Paris. She studied at both the École Spéciale d'Architecture and the École des Beaux-Arts de Paris, before returning to Bulgaria and completing her degree in architecture in 1952 from the Sofia Polytechnic.

From 1952 to 1972 she worked at the firm Sofproekt before becoming head of its design studio. In 1968, she was awarded the Koliu Ficheto award for her design of a day care center. In 1969, she built the "Ho Chi Minh Kindergarten", which at the time, it was considered "revolutionary" to design a settling for children in which even the furniture was specifically selected. Prior to that time, most daycare buildings had donated furnishings, but mirroring a small hall of the United Nations Building in Geneva, the design called for beds, tables and chairs to fit the space and the children's needs. Due to some financing problems, the school was not completed until 1969. Her design of the Cultural Center in Pancharevo was honored with the Red Banner of Labor Award in 1977. Stancheva left the employ of Sofproekt in 1982, but continued working with them on a consulting basis until opening her own practice. In 1985, she received the Gold Badge of the Bulgarian Union of Architects for her contributions to the architectural heritage. Stancheva retired in 1994 and in 1997 donated her architectural library to the International Archive of Women in Architecture at Virginia Tech.

Stancheva died on 2 January 2010, at the age of 84.

== Works ==
- 1956-1958, Barwmov School in Zaimov neighborhood, Sofia.
- 1962-1964, Zapaden Park Kindergarten, Sofia.
- 1963-1968, Krasno selo Daycare center and kindergarten, Sofia.
- 1970-1975, Pancharevo Cultural Center, Sofia.
- 1971-1977, Videlina Cultural Center, Pancharevo.
- 1977, Masterplan for sports complex "Gara Iskur"—Druzhba, Sofia.
- 1977-1978, daycare center for 366th neighborhood-Bukata, Sofia.
- 1979, Institute for Industrial Aesthetics and Institute for Glass and Ceramic Manufacture to the Committee for Science and Technology
