= Vesselina Kasarova =

Bulgarian operatic mezzo-soprano

- Веселина Кацарова
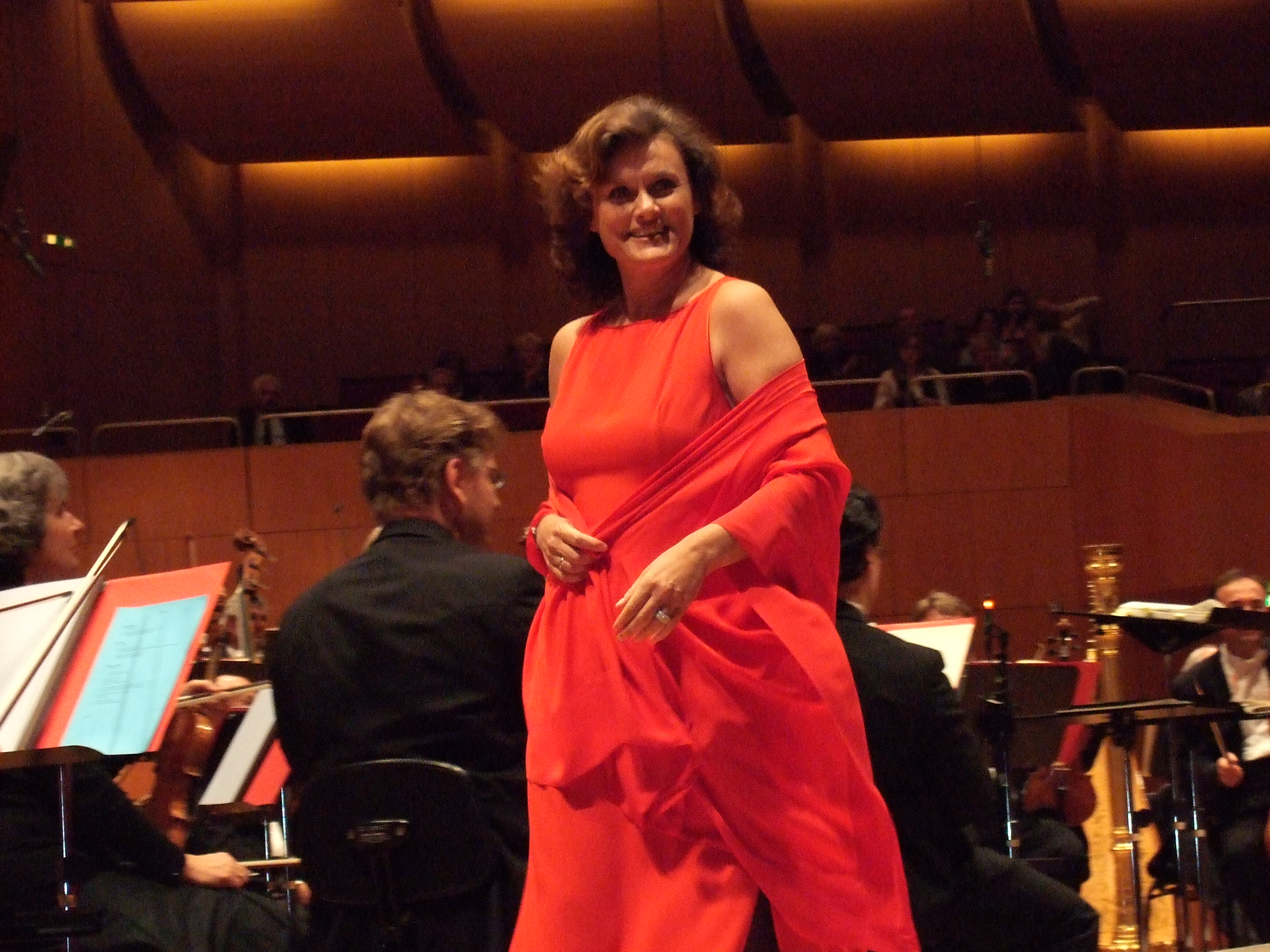
- Vesselina Kasarova at the Offenbach Konzert in 2007
- Born: 18 July 1965 (age 61); Stara Zagora, People's Republic of Bulgaria
- Occupation: Operatic mezzo-soprano
- Years active: 1989–present
- Organisation: Zürich Opera House
- Website: www.kasarova.com

Vesselina Kasarova (Bulgarian: Веселина Кацарова; born 18 July 1965) is a Bulgarian operatic mezzo-soprano.

== Early life and education ==
Kasarova was born in the central Bulgarian town of Stara Zagora. Under the communist regime she studied Russian as a second language and had an early start in music education. She started taking piano lessons at the Pionerski Dom at age 4 (in 1970) and enrolled at Hristina Morfova School of Music and Performing Arts (normal studies in the morning, and music in the afternoon) in her native town in 1979. As she studied piano and worked as accompanist at recitals, Kasarova became so drawn to the voice as a musical instrument that upon earning her concert pianist diploma in 1987, she switched to study singing under Ressa Koleva at Bulgarian State Music Academy in Sofia, focusing on the works of Mozart and Rossini. Kasarova gave her first singing performance in her native town singing "Habanera" from Bizet's Carmen. She performed at Sofia National Opera while still a student. She performed the part of Rosina in The Barber of Seville for her graduation exam.

== Singing career ==
In 1989, her final year at the Sofia Conservatory, she and 5 other students were sent to a month-long concert tour of France. The artist agent Luisa Lasser-Petrov made a recording of one of her performances which she sent to Herbert von Karajan, who immediately requested to see her in Salzburg and then in Vienna. They met in Salzburg where she was asked to sing "Agnus Dei" from Bach's Mass in B minor. Karajan wanted to engage her to sing Bach's mass with him at the Salzburg Festival the following year, but died shortly after. The Impresario of the Vienna State Opera, Ioan Holender (then jointly directing with Eberhard Wächter) was persuaded by Lasser-Petrov to hear her auditions and immediately offered her a 2 yrs contract at that house to start in 1991-92 season. When she returned to Bulgaria, she took part in another audition at Stara Zagora Opera where she was heard by Christoph Groszer, the impresario of the Zürich Opera. He also immediately engaged her for his company.

After graduation, Kasarova joined the ensemble at Zurich Opera in 1989 and made her professional stage debut in Wagner's Götterdämmerung as the 2nd Norn and Wellgunde. She soon became a local favorite there with the audience appreciative of her unique vocal timbres, expressive intensity, and virtuoso ability. She also entered and won that year's Neue Stimmen competition. The competition was sponsored by Bertelsmann, which owns BMG Classics label, leading to her exclusive recording contract.

In 1991, she made her debut at the Salzburg Festival singing 2 concerts in commemoration of Mozart's 200th death anniversary and as Annio in Mozart's La clemenza di Tito under Sir Colin Davis. In that same year she left Zurich to fulfill her contract at the Vienna State Opera debuting in the role of Rosina in Rossini's The Barber of Seville, and remained with the company for 2 years.

Her international career took flight in Salzburg in 1992 when at short notice, she stood in for Marilyn Horne as Tancredi in two concert performances of the Rossini opera. Since then she has been a regular guest at that summer festival, performing in Mozart's La clemenza di Tito, Idomeneo, Così fan tutte, Mitridate, the Mozart pastiche Ombra felice, and Berlioz's La damnation de Faust. She has also performed at other notable opera festivals such as Bregenz, St. Moritz, Glyndebourne, Munich and Pesaro.

Kasarova has worked with many leading conductors, including Nikolaus Harnoncourt, Sir Colin Davis, Pinchas Steinberg, Donald Runnicles, Seiji Ozawa, Semyon Bychkov, Daniel Barenboim, Riccardo Muti, Marcello Viotti, Alberto Zedda, Franz Welser-Möst, Sir Roger Norrington, Eve Queler, Wolfgang Sawallisch, Ivor Bolton, Rossen Milanov, Nayden Todorov, Pavel Baleff and Friedrich Haider. Her recordings and concert work have included collaborations with orchestras and ensembles such as the Staatskapelle Dresden, the Munich Radio Orchestra, Sofia Philharmonic, Il Complesso Barocco and the Philharmonie Baden-Baden, under conductors including Colin Davis, Ulf Schirmer, Giuliano Carella, Arthur Fagen, Alan Curtis, Friedrich Haider and Pavel Baleff.

Kasarova initially specialized in Mozart's operas and works by bel canto composers such as Rossini, Bellini, and Donizetti. By the mid 2000s she became much sought after in Baroque trouser roles such as Orphée in Gluck's Orphée et Eurydice, Ruggiero in Händel's Alcina, and the title role in Ariodante. After her first assumption of Bizet's Carmen in 2008, however, her voice has gained more warmth and size as she adds more dramatic roles to her repertoire. When asked about her repertory change in interviews the singer consistently states her intention to keep singing bel canto roles for as long as possible in order to maintain vocal health as she moves toward the heavier roles of French, Verdi & Wagnerian operas.

In 2003 Kasarova collaborated with the Bulgarian composer Krassimir Kyurkchiyski to produce the CD 'Bulgarian Soul'. She sings with the Cosmic Voices from Bulgaria and the Sofia Soloists Orchestra in this compilation of Bulgarian folk songs. "Many people don't know my native land. I would like them to discover the Bulgarian soul," the singer commented. She hosted Deutsche Welle's Euromaxx television series Vesselina Kasarova: Bulgarian Encounters, introducing European audiences to her native Bulgaria.

The versatile singer spends her time between performances giving master classes, and, in March 2012, published her first book, Ich singe mit Leib und Seele (I Sing With Heart And Soul), with music critic Dr. Mariane Zelger-Vogt.

Recent roles:

- "Carmen" in Bizet's Carmen
- "Charlotte" in Massenet's Werther
- "Dalila" in Saint-Saëns's Samson et Dalila
- "Eboli" in Verdi's Don Carlo
- "Marina" in Modest Mussorgsky's Boris Godunov
- "Romeo" in Bellini's I Capuleti e I Montecchi* (retired in Munich in 2012)
- "Ruggiero" in Handel's Alcina
- "Venus" in Wagner's Tannhäuser
- "Orlofsky" in Strauss Jr's Die Fledermaus
- "Helene" in Offenbach's La Belle Helene
- "Judit" in Bartók's Bluebeard's Castle

== Awards and honors ==
Kasarova won the "Female Singer of the Year" (Sängerin des Jahres) in 2003 Echo Klassik. In 2005 she won the Merkur Preis and was named Bavarian Kammersängerin. She was also named Österreichische Kammersängerin in April 2010.

== Recordings of operatic roles ==
- Tchaikovsky: Pique Dame (The Queen Of Spades) (1988) -- [audio CD] As a governess with Emil Tchakarov & Sofia Festival Orchestra
- Tchaikovsky: Pique Dame (1992) -- [VHS] As Pauline with Seiji Ozawa & Vienna State Opera
- Bellini: Beatrice di Tenda (1992) -- [audio CD] As Agnese with Pinchas Steinberg & ORF Symphony Orchestra
- Rossini: Tancredi (1996) --[audio CD] As Tancredi with Roberto Abbado & Munich Radio Orchestra
- Weber: Oberon (1996) --[audio CD] As Fatime with Marek Janowski & Deutsches Symphonie-Orchester Berlin
- Offenbach: La Belle Hélène (1997) -- [VHS & DVD] As Hélène with Nikolaus Harnoncourt & Zurich Opera (Note: VHS and DVD versions show performances from different dates.)
- Massenet: Werther (1999) --[Audio CD] As Charlotte with Vladimir Jurowski & Deutsches Symphonie-Orchester Berlin
- Bellini: I Capuleti e i Montecchi (1999) --[Audio CD] As Romeo with R. Abbado & Munich Radio Orchestra
- Berlioz: La damnation de Faust (1999) -- [DVD] As Marguerite with Sylvain Chambreling from the 1999 Salzburg Festival
- Rossini: The Barber of Seville (2001) -- [DVD] As Rosina with Nello Santi and Zurich Opera
- Donizetti: La Favorite (2001) --[Audio CD] As Leonor with Viotti & Munich Radio Orchestra
- Monteverdi: Il ritorno d'Ulisse in patria (2003) -- [DVD] As Penelope with N. Harnoncourt & Zurich Opera
- Mozart: La clemenza di Tito (2003) --[DVD] As Sesto with Nikolaus Harnoncourt from the Salzburg Summer Festival (now part of the M22 project)
- Gluck: Orphée et Eurydice (2004) --[DVD] As Orphée with Ivor Bolton & Bavaria State Opera
- R. Strauß: Der Rosenkavalier (2005) --[DVD] As Oktavian with Franz Welser-Mōst & Zurich Opera
- Mozart" La clemenza di Tito (2005) --[DVD] As Sesto with Franz Welser-Mōst from Zurich Opera
- Mozart: La clemenza di Tito (2006) --[Doppel CD] As Sesto with Pinchas Steinburg & Munchner Rundfunkorchester
- Mozart: Mitridate, re di Ponto (2006) --[Doppel CD] As Farnace with Sir Roger Norrington & Camerata Salzburg from the 1997 Salzburg Festival
- Rossini: La Cenerentola (2006) --[Doppel CD] As Angelina with Carlo Rizzi & Munchner Rundfunkorchester
- Donizetti: Dom Sebastien (March 2007) --[CD] As Zayda with Mark Elder & ROH Orchestra
- Händel: Alcina (September 2007) -- [SACD] As Ruggiero with Ivor Bolton from Bavarian State Opera
- Bizet: Carmen (2008) -- [DVD] As Carmen with Franz Welser-Möst from Zurich Opera
- Händel: Alcina (November 2010) -- [DVD] As Ruggiero with Marc Minkowski and Les Musiciens du Louvre—Grenoble at the Wiener Staatsoper

== Other recordings ==
Vesselina Kasarova has an exclusive recording contract with RCA Victor Red Seal.

- Hermann Suter Le Laudi (Le laudi di San Francesco d’Assisi) (1991) --[Audio CD] with Budapester Sinfoniker Chor and Kinderchor des Ungarischen Rundfunks Budapest
- Wir Schwestern Zwei, Wir Schönen --[Audio CD] lieder duets with Edita Gruberova including the famous Rossini's Katzen-Duett (Duetto buffo di due gatti)
- Berlioz, Ravel, Chausson (1994) --[Audio CD] song cycles with Pinchas Steinberg and the ORF Symphonieorchester (This recording won the Prix Maurice Ravel award)
- A Portrait (1996) --[Audio CD] with Friedrich Haider and the Munchner Rundfunkorchester. Arias from Handel's Rinaldo, Gluck's Orfeo ed Euridice, Mozart's Le nozze di Figaro and Don Giovanni, Rossini's Il barbiere di Siviglia and L'italiana in Algeri, Donizetti's Anna Bolena and La favorita, and Bellini's I Capuleti e i Montecchi.
- Franz Schubert: Mass No. 6 in E-Major (1997) --[Audio CD] with Riccardo Muti & Wiener Philharmoniker and Chor des Mitteldeutschen Rundfunks, Leipzig
- Gustav Mahler: Symphony No. 8 in E-Major "Sinfonie der Tausend" (1997) --[Audio CD] with Sir Colin Davis & Symphonieorchester des Bayerischen Rundfunks
- Mozart Arias (1997) --[Audio CD] with Sir Colin Davis and the Staatskapelle Dresden. Arias from Cosi fan tutte, Le nozze di Figaro, Idomeneo, Mitridate, Don Giovanni, Lucio Silla, and La clemenza di Tito. This recording was nominated for the Grammy Award
- Schubert, Brahms, Schumann: Lieder (1999) [Audio CD] with Friedrich Haider
- Rossini: Arias and Duets (2000) [Audio CD] with Juan Diego Florez and Arthur Fagen & Musikalische Leitung. This record won the 2000 Cannes Classical Awards for Songs and Vocal Recitals 19/20 Century.
- Nuit Resplendissante (2001) [Audio CD] Rarely heard French opera arias with Frédéric Chaslin & Münchner Rundfunkorchester
- Love Entranced: French Opera Arias (2002) [Audio CD] with Frédéric Chaslin and the Munich Radio Orchestra.
- Bulgarian Soul: Kyurkchiyski (2003) [Audio CD] with Cosmic Voices from Bulgaria under Vania Moneva, and the Sofia Soloists Chamber Orchestra under Tzanko Delibozov singing traditional Bulgarian folk songs. This recording was nominated for the German ECHO Klassik award (Classics Without Frontier)
- Berlin Opera Night (2004) --[DVD & audio CD] Sings Charlotte's letter scene from Werther as part of the benefit concert to raise fund for AIDS research. CD under title Gala Night
- The Magic of Kasarova (2004) [Audio CD] compilation of arias from her acclaimed roles including tracks from live performances from the 2003 Munich production of Orphée et Eurydice and the 1999 Salzburger Festspiele production of La damnation de Faust.
- Belle Nuit (2008) [Audio CD] with Ulf Schirmer and the Munich Radio Orchestra. Live recording of a concert at Philharmonie am Gastieg of Offenbach operetta arias.
- Sento Brillar (July 2008) [Audio CD] with Alan Curtis and Il Complesso Barocco. Studio recording of Handel opera arias that were written for Carestini.
- Passionate Arias (May 2009) [Audio CD] with Giuliani Carrera and Munich Radio Orchestra. Studio recordings of compilation of dramatic mezzo-soprano arias.
- Chopin At The Opera (2010) [DVD] Documentary on opera's influence on the music of Frédéric Chopin. Filmed at George Sands' estate with short clips of Kasarova's rehearsal for a concert with Roland Raphael.
- China Meets Europe (2014) [Audio CD] with Xincao Li and Tonkuenstler-Orchester. Studio recording of Enjott Schneider's 3rd Symphony.
- Of Madness And Love (2015) [Audio CD] with Ivor Bolton and Sinfonieorchester Basel. Music of Hector Berlioz.
- Russian Arias (2015) [Audio CD] with Pavel Baleff and Philharmonie Baden-Baden.

== TV documentary ==
- Vesselina Kasarova: Ein Portrait: Mozart ist ohne Ende (BMG Classic & Saarländischer Rundfunk) From 1997 interview with clips from Idomeneo in Florence, I Capuleti e i Montecchi in Paris, recording session of her Mozart Arias CD in Dresden
- Tell Me, Little White Cloud (Arte-TV) Making of Bulgarian Soul CD with the Cosmic Voices from Bulgaria Female Choir
- Vesselina Kasarova: Die Kunst der Verwandlung (ORF) 2005 documentary of her career.
- Bulgarian Encounters Deutsche Welle's Euromaxx television series where Kasarova serves as the host
