= Jacob Soulliere =

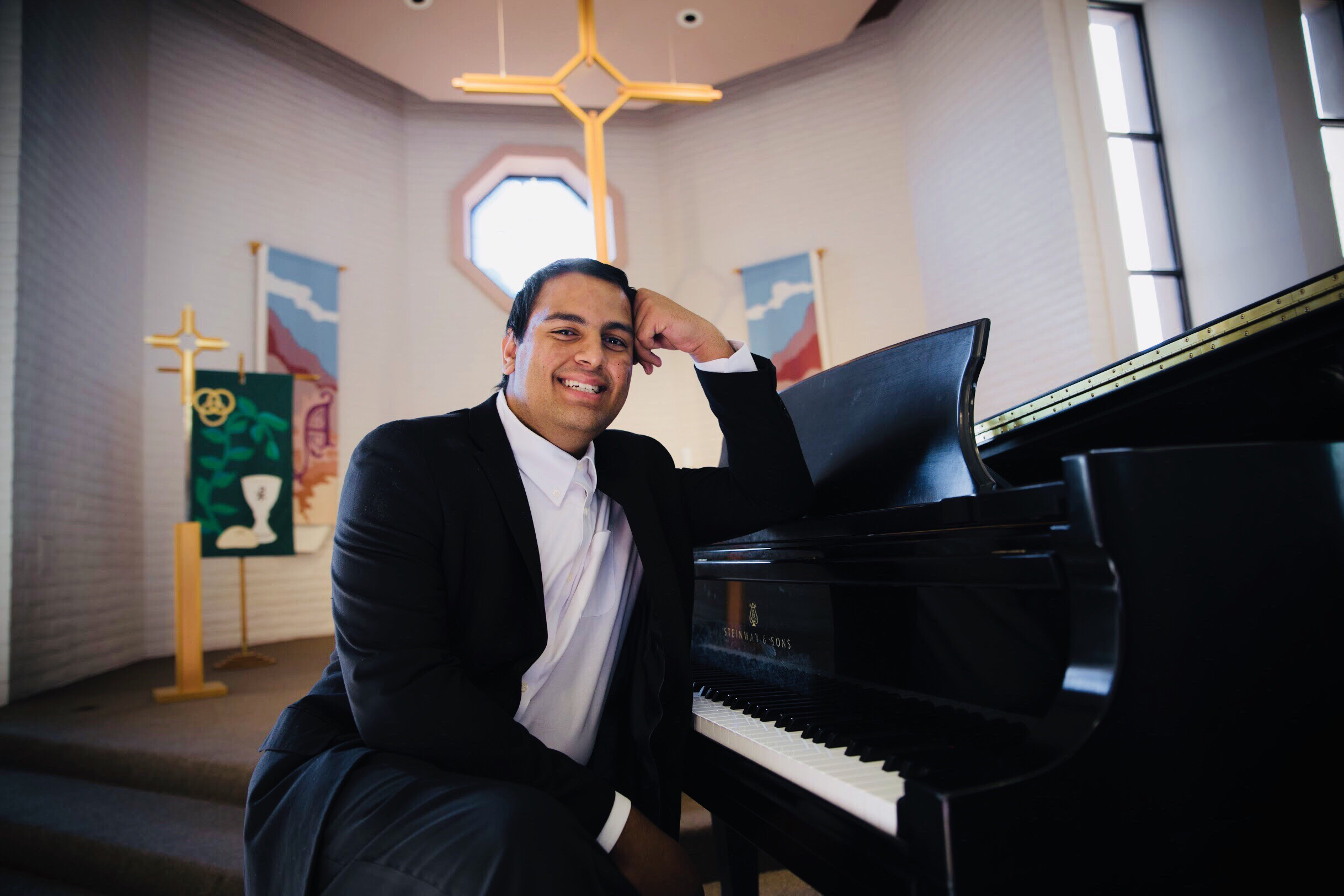
- Soulliere in 2018

Background information
- Born: Roumen Atanasov Angelov; July 28, 1999 (age 26); Sofia, Bulgaria
- Origin: Arizona, United States
- Genres: Opera
- Occupation: Opera singer
- Years active: 1999-present
- Website: www.jacobsoulliere.com

Jacob Soulliere (born in Sofia, Bulgaria) is a Bulgarian baritone opera singer.

== Career ==
Soulliere began his early choral singing as a member of the Phoenix Boys Choir. Singing at Arizona's Music Fest Young Musicians Vocal Competition, Soulliere was asked by American composer, conductor, and lecturer, Z. Randall Stroope to sing the written solo in the choral piece and being selected to sing at the White House.

In December 2016 Soulliere was selected to perform with the newly formed Messiah Chorus in the production of Handel's Messiah under the direction of 4-time Grammy winner Vance George, formerly director of the San Francisco Symphony Chorus.

Soulliere participates as a choir member and as a soloist at Christ the Lord Lutheran Church in Carefree, Arizona. He studied voice with mezzo-soprano Mary Sue Hyatt, who formerly served as professor of voice at Kent State University. He currently studies at the San Francisco Conservatory of Music, with Professor Lester Lynch.

== Awards and recognitions ==
Soulliere was being named "one of Arizona's finest young musicians".

Soulliere was the only vocalist selected to perform at the Musical Instrument Museum in 2016.

In 2017 and 2018, Soulliere placed 1st for two consecutive years in the Cheryl Siebs Memorial Vocal Competition.

Soulliere received the $500 scholarship and performed as the featured soloist at the Desert Hills Presbyterian Church as a part of the award. Most recently, Soulliere was a finalist for the Herberger Theater “young artist competition”
