= Christina Morfova =

Bulgarian operatic soprano

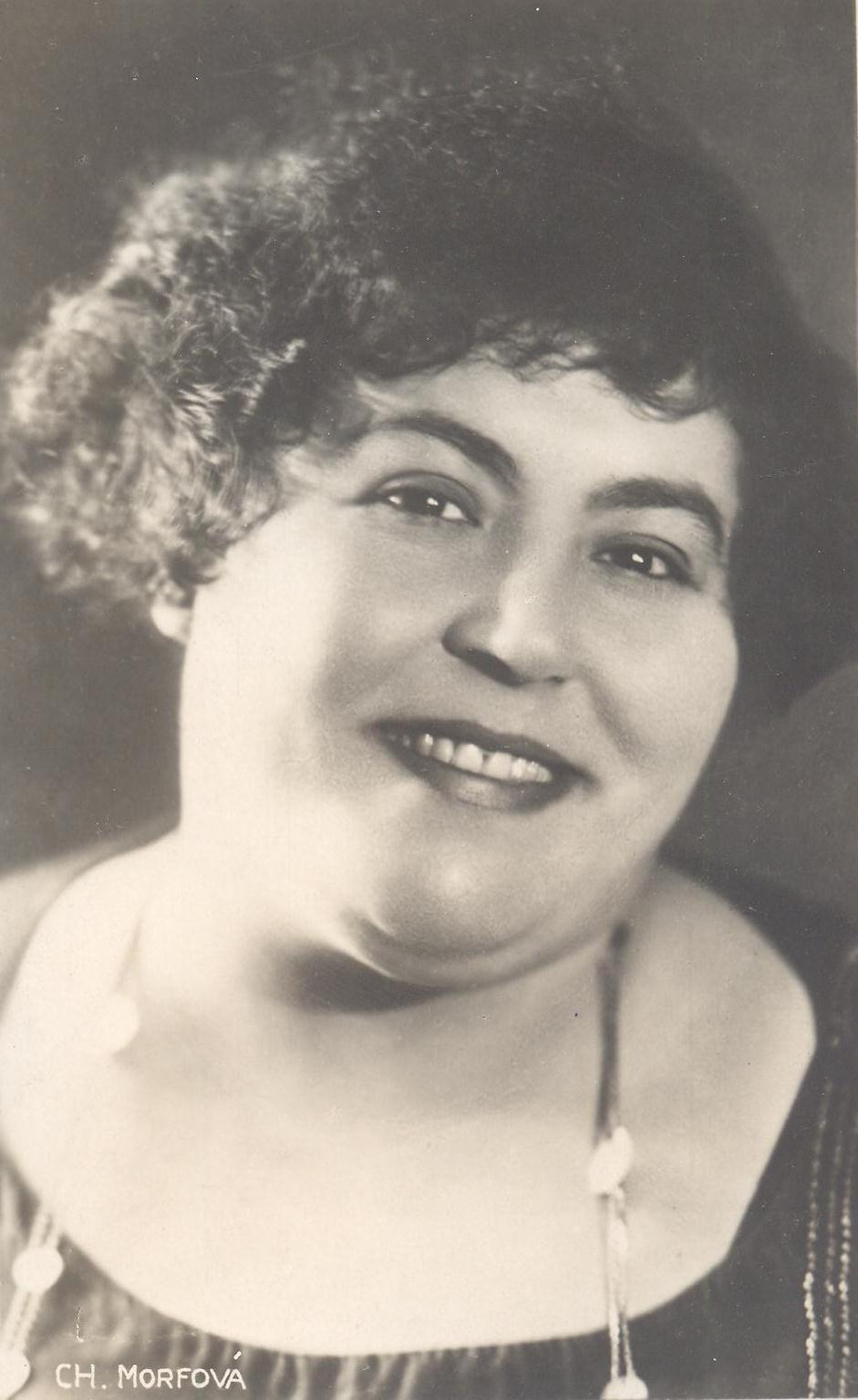
Christina Morfova

Christina Morfova (Bulgarian: Христина Морфова; 24 April 1887 – 1 June 1936) was a Bulgarian operatic soprano who gained fame with performances in Prague, Sofia, and in the principal opera houses of Europe. A member of the Sofia National Opera until 1935, she also taught at the Bulgarian Academy of Music. She died in a car accident when only 47.

== Biography ==
Born on 24 April 1887 in Stara Zagora, Christina Morfova began to study economics in Prague in 1906. She soon moved to the Prague Conservatory where she studied singing under Marie Pivodová.

Her début, in 1910, was in Brno where she sang in Smetana's The Bartered Bride. After spending a year in Paris where she studied under Jacques Isnardon, she returned to Sofia in 1912 to perform Marie in The Bartered Bride's Bulgarian premier. After touring in the Balkans and Russia, she joined the Prague National Theatre in 1916, first taking the role of the Queen of the Night in The Magic Flute.

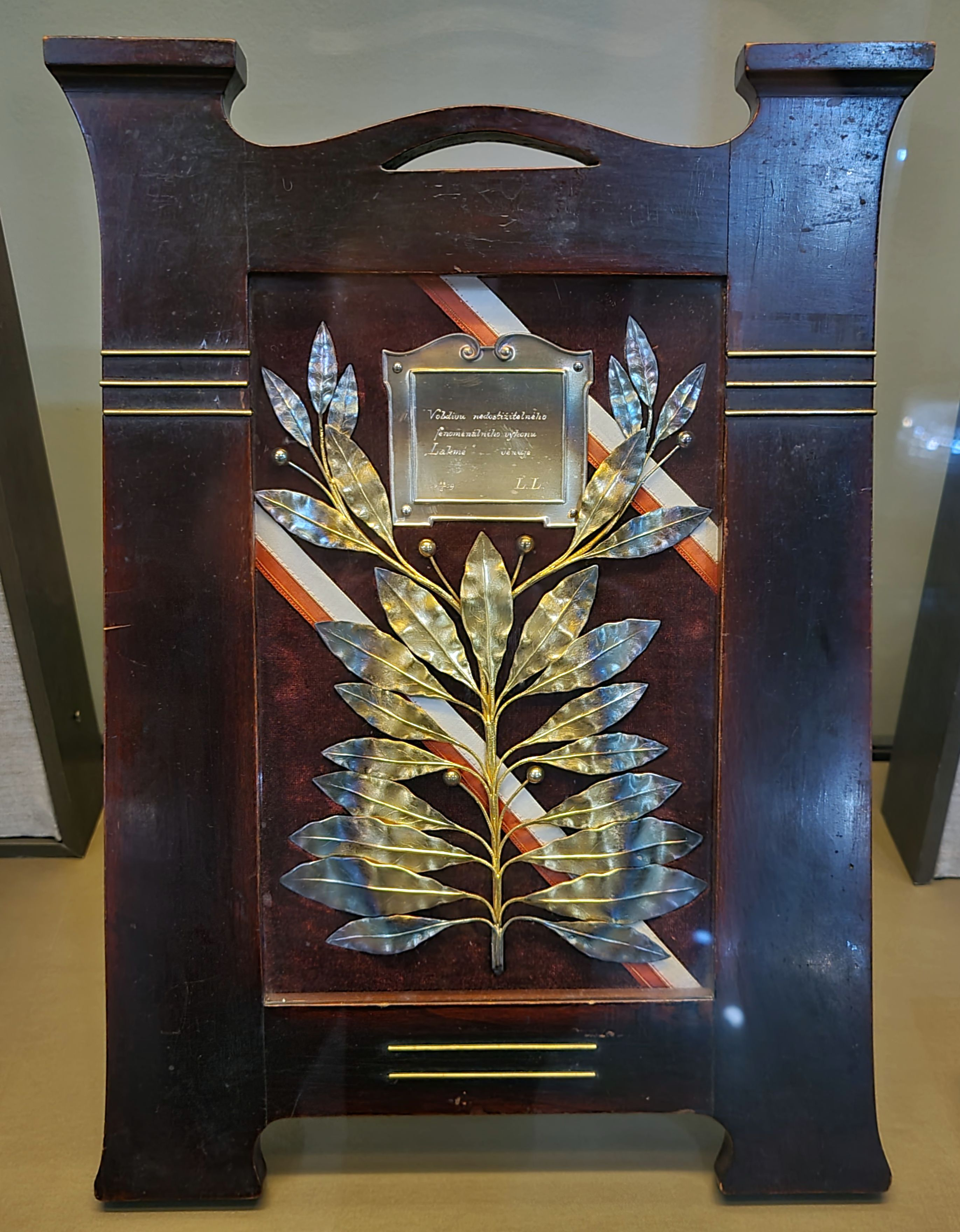

In the early 1920s, she also sang in Germany, Italy, Paris and London. After returning to Sofia in the late 1920s, she joined the Sofia National Opera in 1931 and taught at the National Academy of Music. She performed in some 40 different roles, including Aida, Lakme, Queen of the Night, Mignon, Butterfly, Violetta and Donna Anna, as well as the leading roles in operas by Dvořák and Smetana. Thanks to her vocal range, she was able to take both soprano and mezzo-soprano parts.

Christina Morfova died on 1 June 1936 in a car accident while travelling with friends near Pirdop.
