= Kremena Stancheva =

Kremena Stancheva Кремена Станчева
- Born: October 21, 1941; Kovachevtsi, Kingdom of Bulgaria
- Died: March 8, 2013 (aged 71); Sofia, Bulgaria
- Genres: Folk
- Instrument: Singing
- Formerly of: "The Mystery Of Bulgarian Voices"

Kremena Stancheva (Bulgarian: Кремена Станчева; 1941–2013) was a Bulgarian folk singer.
