= Galina Savova =

Bulgarian operatic soprano

- Галина Савова
- Born: 1940
- Died: January 3, 2021
- Occupation: Operatic soprano
- Employer(s): Sofia National Opera; Frankfurt Opera; Metropolitan Opera
- Known for: Performances in major European and international opera houses; roles in Turandot, Aida, La Gioconda, Fidelio, Tosca, Cavalleria Rusticana, Tannhäuser
- Partner: Giuseppe Patanè

Galina Savova (Bulgarian: Галина Савова; 1940 – 3 January 2021) was a Bulgarian operatic soprano. The singer completed her education first in Varna, in Sofia and then began her career in 1966 with a beginner's engagement at the Sofia National Opera Theater. There, she sang much Bulgarian, Russian, and Italian operatic repertoire, as it was set in 1971 at a guest performance of the Opera of Sofia at the Paris Grand Opera in the title role of Puccini's Turandot.

== Professional career ==
In 1972 Savova first sang in West Germany, in Darmstadt. She remained close to the Opera House of Frankfurt where she was heard again and again from 1982-87 in leading roles. She has performed at the State Operas of Hamburg and Munich (1983, 1985), at the Opera of Marseille (1985), at the Teatro San Carlos in Lisbon (including 1986 as Leonore in Beethoven's Fidelio), at the Liceu in Barcelona (1987 in the title roles the opera Aida by Verdi and Beatrice di Tenda by Bellini).

In Italy, at the Verona festival in 1980 and 1988, she participated in the title role of the opera La Gioconda by Ponchielli, in 1983 and 1988 as Turandot in 1984 as Aida. In the latter role, she also took over at the 1987 Festival of Savonlinna. In 1988 at the Teatro Fenice in Venice again as a guest Turandot, Teatro San Carlos Lisbon as Tosca. At the Metropolitan Opera in New York, she sang in 1982 as the inaugural Amelia in Verdi's Un Ballo in maschera and there was also heard as Tosca, Santuzza in Cavalleria Rusticana, Gioconda, Aida, and as Venus in Tannhauser. In 1985-86 she performed in Amsterdam as Santuzza.

In 1989 Savova was a guest performer at the Teatro San Carlos Lisbon as Aida. She sang Turandot in 1990 at the Covent Garden Opera in London and the Australian Opera House in Sydney. She sang Turandot again in 1992 at the Lyric Opera of Chicago and at the opera house in Limoges. Apart from the aforementioned roles, she has also portrayed the title character in Puccini's Manon Lescaut, Minnie in La Fanciulla del West, Senta in The Flying Dutchman, Eva in Die Meistersinger von Nürnberg, and Ortrud in Lohengrin.

== Personal life ==
For a number of years Savova was the companion of conductor Giuseppe Patanè.

== Sources ==
- Hall, Charles J., Chronology of Western Classical Music, Taylor & Francis, 2002. ISBN 0-415-94216-0
- Metropolitan Opera, Savova, Galina (Soprano), performance record on the MetOpera Database. Accessed 8 October 2009.
