= Anna Tomowa-Sintow =

Bulgarian soprano (born 1941)

Anna Tomowa-Sintow Анна Томова-Синтова
- Tomowa-Sintow in 1981

Background information
- Born: 22 September 1941 (age 84); Stara Zagora, Kingdom of Bulgaria
- Genres: Classical, Romantic
- Occupation: Opera singer (soprano)
- Years active: 1962 – present
- Website: www.tomowa-sintow.com

Anna Tomowa-Sintow (Bulgarian: Анна Томова-Синтова, by official transliteration Anna Tomova-Sintova; born 22 September 1941, in Stara Zagora) is a Bulgarian soprano who has sung to great acclaim in all the major opera houses around the world in a repertoire that includes Mozart, Rossini, Verdi, Puccini, Heinrich Marschner, Wagner, and Strauss. She enjoyed a particularly close professional relationship with conductor Herbert von Karajan from 1973 until his death in 1989.

== Life ==
Tomowa-Sintow began studying piano at age six. At sixteen she won a national singing competition. She later attended the National Conservatory of Sofia, where she studied voice with Professor Georgi Zlatev-Tcherkin and soprano Katia Spiridonowa and graduated with diplomas in voice and piano, making her stage debut, for her master class finals, as Tatiana in Tchaikovsky's Eugene Onegin. Upon graduation, she joined the Opera Studio of the Leipzig Opera, where, in 1967, she made her professional debut as Abigaille in Verdi's Nabucco. While with this company she built up her repertoire with the leading roles in Puccini's Madama Butterfly and Manon Lescaut; Verdi's La traviata, Il trovatore, and Otello; Mozart's Don Giovanni; Strauss's Arabella; and Werner Egk's Die Zaubergeige. For many of these roles she studied with the company's music director, Professor Paul Schmitz, who had studied with Richard Strauss.

In 1972, she was invited to join the Deutsche Staatsoper Berlin, where she was named Kammersängerin during her very first year. In Berlin she continued to expand her repertoire with leading roles in Mozart's The Marriage of Figaro and Così fan tutte, Verdi's Aida, Puccini's Tosca, Tchaikovsky's Eugene Onegin, Wagner's Tannhäuser and Lohengrin, and Strauss's Ariadne auf Naxos and Der Rosenkavalier.

She is also a Kammersängerin of the Vienna State Opera.

In 1973, Tomowa-Sintow auditioned for conductor Herbert von Karajan for the upcoming world premiere of Carl Orff's De temporum fine comœdia at the Salzburg Festival. He hired her immediately, and for the next sixteen years, the two worked frequently together in opera houses, concert halls, and recording studios around the world. Karajan called Tomowa-Sintow "the greatest talent I have encountered over the past years." From 1973 through 1991, Tomowa-Sintow was a permanent guest of the Salzburg Festival. With that maestro, she recorded Le nozze di Figaro (1978), Lohengrin (opposite René Kollo and Dunja Vejzovic, 1976–81) and Der Rosenkavalier (with Agnes Baltsa and Janet Perry, 1982).

Tomowa-Sintow made her San Francisco Opera debut in 1974, as Donna Anna in Don Giovanni; her Covent Garden debut in 1975, as Fiordiligi in Così fan tutte; her Metropolitan Opera debut in 1978 and her Lyric Opera of Chicago debut in 1980, both as Donna Anna; and her La Scala debut in 1982, as Elsa in Lohengrin.

Her recording of Ariadne auf Naxos with James Levine and the Vienna Philharmonic won the 1988 Grammy Award for Best Opera Recording.

In 2011, Anna Tomowa-Sintow marked 45 years of artistic activity with a gala concert in her native Stara Zagora, opening the 43rd Festival of Opera and Ballet Arts. The concert took place on 11 November 2011 at the Opera house, with the orchestra of the State Opera Stara Zagora under Nayden Todorov and soloists including Tomowa-Sintow, Niko Isakov and Milena Gyurova.

== Discography ==
- Mozart: Le nozze di Figaro, Decca CD, 478–343–8, 2012

== Videography ==
- The Metropolitan Opera Centennial Gala, Deutsche Grammophon DVD, 00440–073–4538, 2009
