= Maria Neykova =

Maria Neykova Мария Янкова Нейкова
- Also known as: Girl with the Guitar
- Born: Maria Yankova Neykova; 21 December 1945; Plovdiv, Bulgaria
- Died: 1 August 2002 (aged 56) Sofia, Bulgaria
- Genre: Pop
- Occupations: Singer and composer
- Formerly of: Sofia Symphonic Orchestra

Maria Yankova Neykova (Bulgarian: Мария Янкова Нейкова), sometimes spelled Maria Neikova, (1945–2002) was a Bulgarian singer and composer.

== Biography ==
Maria Neykova was born on 21 December 1945, in Plovdiv, Bulgaria. Neykova graduated from the Academy of Music and Arts in Plovdiv. Known as the "Girl with the Guitar," she was in love with her native Plovdiv. Her career started in 1968. From 1969 to 1973, she was a soloist in the Sofia Symphonic Orchestra. Over the years, Maria composed more than 100 songs. One of her songs, "The World is for Two" (Bulgarian: Светът е за двама), is very popular in Bulgaria.

After surviving a plane crash, a terrorist attack and eight operations, she died suddenly at her home in Sofia on 1 August 2002. She outlived her husband Niki by only a year.

== Discography ==
=== Small records ===
- 1973 - "Maria Neykova" (Balkanton - ВТМ 6522), tracks: "Зеленият Прозорец" (The Green Window), etc.
- 1973 - "Maria Neykova" (Balkanton - ВТК 3018)
- 1979 - "Maria Neykova" (Balkanton - ВТК 3477)

=== LPs ===
- 1975 - "Maria Neykova" (Balkanton - ВТА 1640), tracks: "Errand" (Заръка), etc.
- 1990 - "For Herself and for the Others" (Bulgarian: За себе си и за другите) (Balkanton - VTA 12456, VTA 12457) (two records)

=== CDs ===
- 2009 - "Златните Хитове 1" (Golden Hits 1) (22 tracks), (BG Music company)
- 2010 - "Светът е за двама. Мария Нейкова и приятели. Златните хитове 2" (BG Music company)

=== Digital albums ===
- 2010 - "Golden Hits" (Bulgarian: Златните хитове) (19 tracks), (Balkanton)

== Awards ==
- First Place in Golden Orpheus (1969) for the song "Закъснели срещи" (Late dates)
- First Place in Melody of the Year (Bulgaria, 1972) for the song "Добър вечер, лека нощ" (Good Evening, Good Night)
