= Kamen Tchanev =

Bulgarian tenor (1964–2020)

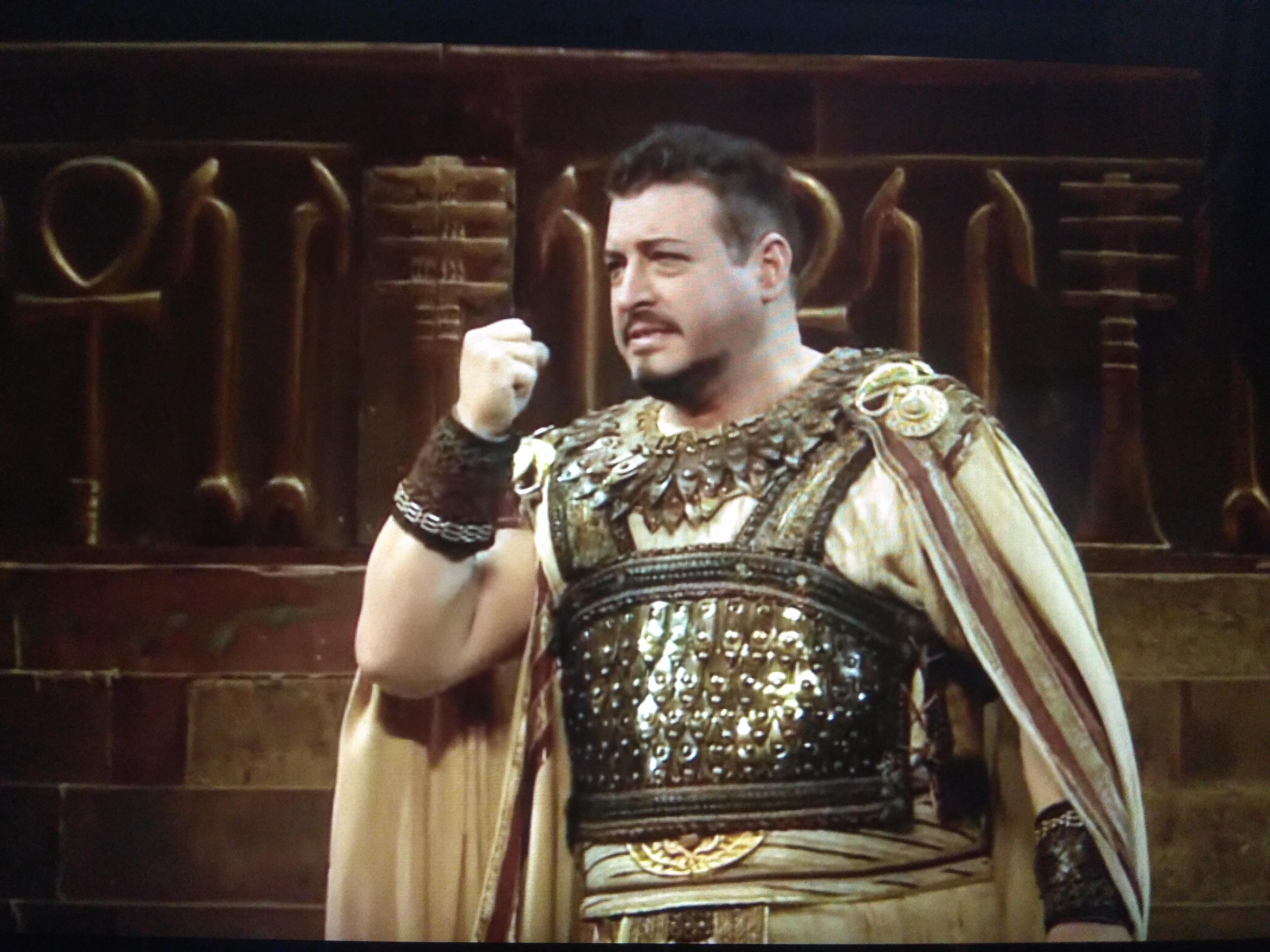
- Tchanev as Radames in Aida, Opera Astana in 2019
- Born: 27 August 1964; Sliven, Bulgaria
- Died: 26 November 2020 (aged 56); Stara Zagora, Bulgaria
- Occupation: opera singer (tenor)

Kamen Tchanev / Kamen Chanev (Bulgarian: Камен Чанев) (27 August 1964 – 26 November 2020) was a Bulgarian operatic tenor who enjoyed an international career.

== Early years and education ==
Kamen Tchanev was born in Sliven and studied at the French language school in his home town. In 1991 he graduated from the Bulgarian State Music Academy "Pancho Vladigerov" and in 1992 he specialized at the Boris Hristov Academy of Music and Arts in Rome. He has worked together with Alexandrina Miltcheva, Ghena Dimitrova, and Leone Magiera, Luciano Pavarotti's pianist.

In 1994, he was laureate in the Jussi Björling international competition for tenors.

== Career ==
In 1993 Kamen Tchanev started working at the Sofia National Opera, where he made his stage debut as the Duke of Mantua in Verdi's Rigoletto. Five years later he moved to Prague, where he sang for two years before becoming a freelancer whilst remaining a frequent guest at the Prague State Opera. He has subsequently performed in many opera houses in Bulgaria and the Czech Republic, as well as internationally in (among others) Austria, France, Germany, Switzerland, Sweden, Italy, Romania, Hungary, Latvia, Lithuania, Canada, USA, South Korea and many others.

At the beginning of his career, Tchanev performed lyric roles such as the title roles of Gounod's Faust, Massenet's Werther, Alfredo in Verdi's La traviata, Lensky in Tchaikovsky's Eugene Onegin, Edgardo in Donizetti's Lucia di Lammermoor, Tonio in Leoncavallo's Pagliacci, Count Almaviva in Rossini's Il barbiere di Siviglia and Don Ottavioo in Mozart's Don Giovanni. Later he added more dramatic roles to his repertoire, such as Puccini's Cavaradossi in Tosca, Calaf in Turandot and Radames in Aida. He collaborated with conductors such as Riccardo Muti, Lorin Maazel, Nicola Luisotti, Michail Jurowski, Paolo Carignani, Donato Renzetti, Philippe Auguin and Asher Fisch, among others.

Tchanev made recordings for the Bulgarian National Radio and RAI-2 (Italy). In 1999, he recorded a CD of arias with the Plovdiv Philharmonic Orchestra conducted by Nayden Todorov for the American label MMO.

His career was cut short by his death from COVID-19 at the age of 56, three weeks after his debut as Otello.

== Performances and repertoire ==
Tchanev's roles included:

- Bizet: Carmen – Don José (Philadelphia, Basel)
- Giordano: Andrea Chénier – title role, (Budapest, Sigulda, Beijing, Kassel)
- Leoncavallo: Pagliacci – Tonio, Canio (Tel Aviv, Munich, Budapest)
- Mascagni: Cavalleria rusticana – Turiddu (Tel Aviv, Munich, Budapest)
- Puccini: La bohème – Rodolfo (Atlanta)
- Puccini: Madama Butterfly – Pinkerton (Amsterdam, Valencia, Deutsche Oper Berlin, Vienna, Munich)
- Puccini: Manon Lescaut – Des Grieux (Vienna, Hamburg, Auckland, Split, Washington)
- Puccini: Tosca – Cavaradossi (Terracina, Rome, Toronto, Montreal, Tel Aviv, Savonlinna)
- Puccini: Turandot – Calaf (Warsaw, Astana, Vilnius, Rome, Montreal, Deutsche Oper Berlin)
- Verdi: Aida – Radames (Rome, Warsaw, Astana, Montreal, South Korea)
- Verdi: Attila – (Rome)
- Verdi: Un ballo in maschera – Riccardo (Tokyo, Deutsche Oper Berlin, Vienna, Tel Aviv, Frankfurt)
- Verdi: Don Carlos (Don Carlo) – title role (Oper Frankfurt, Seville, Vilnius, Budapest)
- Verdi: Macbeth (opera) – Macduff (Dublin)
- Verdi: Nabucco – Ismaele (Vienna, Warsaw)
- Verdi: Rigoletto – Duke of Mantua (Solothurn)
- Verdi: Il trovatore – Manrico (Korea National Opera, Liceu, Deutsche Oper Berlin, Budapest, Vilnius)
- Verdi: Requiem
- Verdi: Otello - Otello
