= Peter Richter de Rangenier =

German composer and conductor (1930–2021)

Peter Richter de Rangenier, also Peter Richter (25 March 1930 – 9 August 2021) was a German composer, conductor and university professor.

== Life ==
Born in Prague, Richter de Rangenier grew up in Lübeck, where he attended the Gymnasium and made his first attempts as a composer while still at school. He also founded the Lübecker Kammerorchester during this early period. He then studied composition, conducting, piano, horn and organ at the conservatories in Detmold, Hamburg and the Mozarteum in Salzburg. His teachers included Wilhelm Maler, Wolfgang Fortner and Philipp Jarnach in composition, Kurt Thomas, Eugen Papst and Hans Schmidt-Isserstedt in conducting, Hans Richter-Haaser in piano, Fritz Huth in horn and Michael Schneider in organ.

He worked as a Kapellmeister at the municipal theatre in Hagen in 1954 and at the Wuppertaler Bühnen in 1957. In the same year he founded and became chief conductor of the Junge Philharmonie Südwestfalen/Siegerlandorchester. From 1960 to 1965 he was musical director of the Theater des Westens in Berlin, a position with which he was again associated from 1974 to 1976. During the 1960s he also made numerous radio recordings for German and Austrian broadcasters, including WDR, SWF, ORF, HR, NDR and Bayerischer Rundfunk.

From 1966 to 1974, Richter de Rangenier was closely connected with musical life in Hof, Bavaria. He served as chief conductor of the Hofer Symphoniker and as general music director in Hof, working with both the symphony orchestra and the theatre. During the same period he was also a regular guest conductor of the Bavarian Radio Symphony Orchestra in Munich, where he worked in association with Rafael Kubelík, and took part in tours including a United States and Canada tour in 1968.

In 1977, he went to South America. Until 1981, he trained conductors as a professor at the University of Chile in Santiago and helped build up a university orchestra there. A report in Revista Musical Chilena described his courses at the Faculty of Musical Arts of the University of Chile, noting that he taught orchestral conducting to advanced students, conductors of orchestral ensembles and teachers connected with the university orchestras, and choral conducting to choir directors associated with the faculty and the Chilean choral federation. He also worked with the Department of Music's instrumental ensemble and choir, and with opera and lied classes, focusing on style and interpretation. From 1979 to 1981 he was active in Santiago as conductor of the Orquesta Filarmónica and the Teatro Municipal, while also appearing as guest conductor with other South American orchestras.

Several later musicians' biographies identify Richter de Rangenier as a teacher or formative professor. The Chilean-born conductor and flautist Alfredo Manuel Mendieta Vigueras studied recorder, piano, flute and conducting at the Faculty of Arts of the University of Chile, including conducting with Richter de Rangenier, until 1982. The Chilean choral conductor Nolberto González Hevia is described by El Rancagüino as having perfected his formation with Juan Matteucci and Peter Richter de Rangenier at the University of Chile. In a 2025 interview, Bulgarian conductor Nayden Todorov named Peter Richter among the professors, alongside Karl Österreicher, Günther Theuring, Mendi Rodan, Iván Erőd and Uroš Lajovic, who were important for his formation during his studies abroad.

In 1981 Richter de Rangenier returned to Europe and began teaching composition at the University of Music and Performing Arts Vienna. Concert tours and guest conducting engagements took him to Switzerland, including the Lucerne Festival, and to Germany and Austria. In 1989 he made his debut with the Vienna Symphony at the Musikverein in Vienna. In 1998 he was involved as a co-organiser of the Thracian Summer Music Festival in Plovdiv. In 1999 he moved to Waidhofen an der Ybbs, where he later conducted the local men's choral society and the church choir of the town parish.

Richter de Rangenier died in Waidhofen an der Ybbs on 9 August 2021.

== Work ==
- 1967: Sinfonietta
- 1974: Die Raben von Holland. Opera after Maurice Maeterlinck
- 1982: Und Pippa tanzt! Opera after Gerhart Hauptmann

Furthermore: Symphonies, string quartets, various pieces for different solo instruments, choral works and Lieder.

== Honours and prizes ==
- 1960: Kunstpreis des Landes Nordrhein-Westfalen
- 1961: Förderpreis der Hansestadt Lübeck
- 1980: Ehrenmitglied der Philharmonie Santiago de Chile (Orquesta Filarmónica de Santiago)
- 1982: Theodor Körner Prize
