= Križanke =

Outdoor theatre in Ljubljana, Slovenia

Coordinates: 46°2′48.5″N 14°30′11.53″E

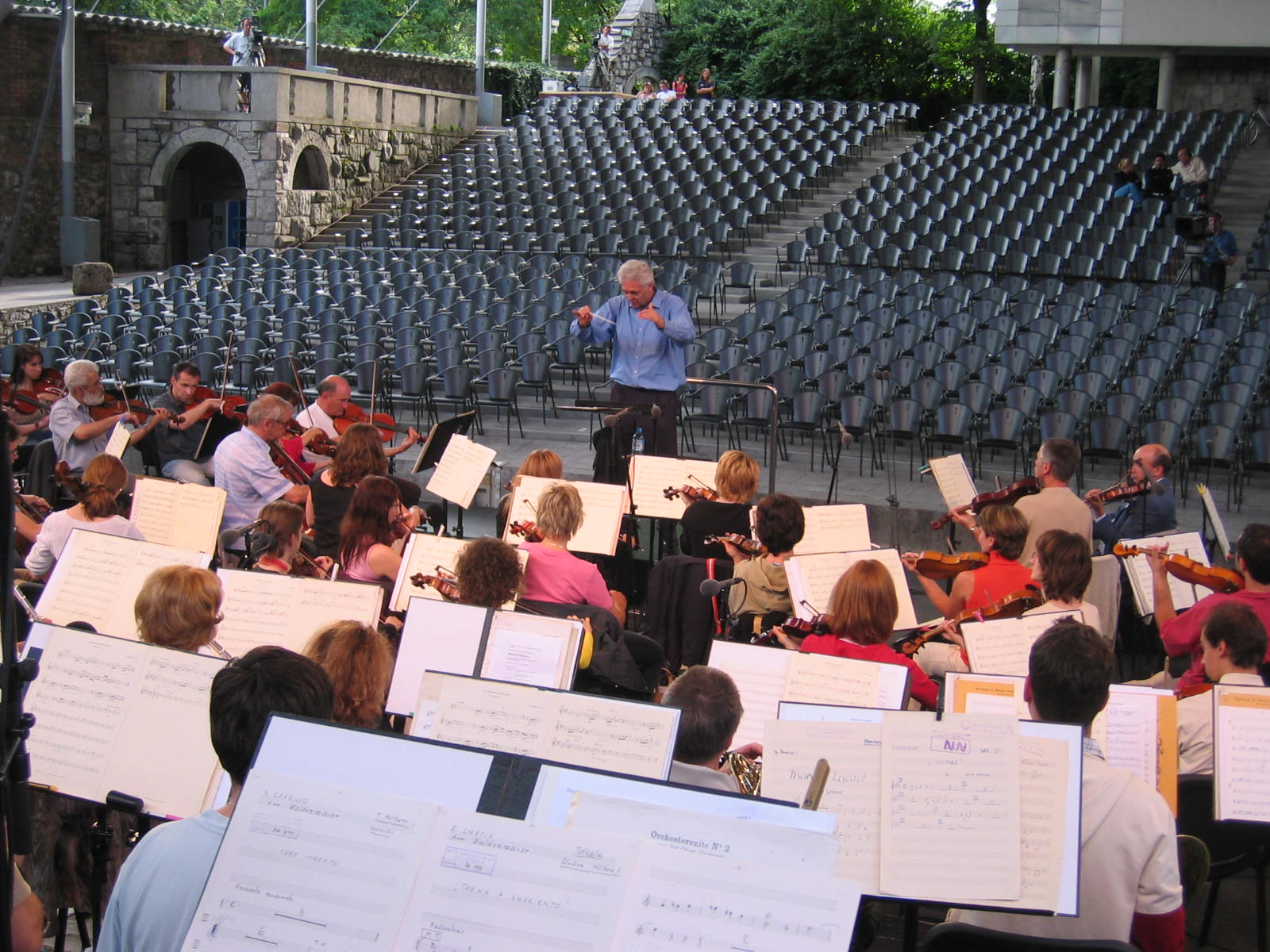
RTV Slovenia Symphony orchestra rehearsal in Križanke southern courtyard.

The Križanke Outdoor Theatre (Poletno gledališče Križanke) is a theatre in Ljubljana, Slovenia, used for summer festivals set up inside the courtyard of the former Monastery of the Holy Cross. It is located at French Revolution Square (Trg francoske revolucije) no. 1.

It was created by Jože Plečnik in the 1950s within the confiscated former monastery especially for the Ljubljana Festival and the Secondary School for Design and Photography. Ljubljana Festival holds major events on the open-air stage, while other venues include the Baroque-style Križanke Church, the Knights' Hall (Viteška dvorana) and the Devil's Courtyard (Peklensko dvorišče). The amphitheatre-like southern courtyard with its large retractable canopy has since proved to be a superb venue for classical, jazz, and rock concerts. The venue is managed by the Festival Ljubljana Public Institute and is available for hire.

The part of the former monastery premises, which is occupied by the Secondary School for Design and Photography, is used to host students interested in photography, graphics design, fashion, industrial arts and an art gymnasium. Because of the lack of space the school is also based on another location, on Roška cesta 2.

== History ==
Construction of the original Monastery of the Order of Teutonic Knights at Križanke is believed to have commenced in 1228. The 1511 Idrija earthquake severely damaged the monastery buildings and they were partly rebuilt between 1567 and 1579. The original church was completely rebuilt in Baroque style between 1714 and 1715; it was designed by Venetian architect Domenico Rossi in a shape of a Greek cross, and was the first church of its kind in Slovenia. It has an ornate exterior and the gate area is accentuated with pilasters and a distinctive undulating dome. Slovene masters participated in the building process, including Gregor Maček Sr., who designed the current city hall. The City Museum of Ljubljana keeps the original model of this church. The Knight's Hall was also built during the 18th century.

Križanke continued to serve as a monastery until 1945, when the complex was nationalised. In 1952 representatives of the city of Ljubljana asked the architect Jože Plečnik to remodel the now derelict monastery into a venue for Ljubljana Festival. Plečnik's last major contribution to the city (the works were completed in 1956) transformed the empty monastery into an open-air theatre and festival space. The complex's original Gothic details were gradually subsumed by Renaissance and Baroque elements, as can be seen in the main courtyard, which features shallow archways and exuberantly-coloured sgraffiti.

== Music performances and festivals ==
A variety of musical performances take place at the Križanke, including Druga Godba, a festival of alternative and world music, from late May to early June. The venue is also one of the principal performance spaces of the Ljubljana Festival, hosting classical concerts, opera galas, jazz, popular music and world-music events.

Classical and symphonic performances at Križanke have included appearances by Plácido Domingo, Joseph Calleja, the Slovenian Philharmonic Orchestra, the Sofia Philharmonic Orchestra among others. Other classical artists and ensembles associated with concerts at Križanke and its halls have included conductor Gianluca Marcianò, conductor Uroš Lajovic, conductor Nayden Todorov, Ensemble Dissonance, baritone Domen Križaj, bassist Rick Stotijn and clarinettist François Benda.

Jazz and related programmes have featured The Duke Ellington Orchestra, conducted by Charlie Young III, as well as Arturo O'Farrill and the Afro Latin Jazz Orchestra. Popular, rock and world-music performers who have appeared at Križanke include Laibach, Vlado Kreslin, Margareth Menezes, Oto Pestner, Marko Hatlak, Tonči Huljić, Petar Grašo, Neisha and the RTV Slovenia Symphony Orchestra.
