= Irena Petkova =

Bulgarian opera singer

Irena Petkova (Bulgarian: Ирена Петкова) is a Bulgarian opera singer. The mezzo-soprano Irena Petkova was born in Bourgas, Bulgaria. She graduated from the Pancho Vladigerov State Music Academy, Sofia under professor Lilly Stefanova.

Since 1990 she has solo performed for the Bourgas Opera, where she made her stage debut in the title role of Bizet's Carmen. In 1992 she was awarded the Margarita Mihova scholarship for best mezzo-soprano vocal performance as Rosina in Il Barbiere di Siviglia. Since 1993 she has been soloist for the Sofia National Opera.

Irena Petkova's repertoire includes arias, songs and other vocal pieces belonging to different periods and styles - among them works by Mozart, Verdi, Gluck, Rossini and Bellini. Irena Petkova has been on concert tours with the Bourgas Opera and the Sofia National Opera to Greece, France, North Macedonia, Germany, Switzerland and Austria.

== Recordings ==
- Mozart Opera Arias for Mezzo-Soprano and Orchestra – Irena Petkova (mezzo-soprano), Plovdiv Philharmonic Orchestra, Nayden Todorov (conductor), 1999. Label: Music Minus One. ISBN 1-59615-552-3
