= Rousse Philharmonic Orchestra =

Bulgarian symphony orchestra

Ruse Philharmonic Orchestra

The Ruse Philharmonic Orchestra (Bulgarian: Русенска филхармония), also rendered as the Rousse Philharmonic Orchestra, is a Bulgarian symphony orchestra based in Ruse. Founded as a state orchestra in 1948, it was an independent state philharmonic institution until 1999, when it merged with the Ruse State Opera into the Opera and Philharmonic Society – Ruse. Since 2010 the orchestra has formed part of Ruse State Opera, while continuing to appear in symphonic programmes under the name Ruse Philharmonic Orchestra.

The orchestra is associated with the development of symphonic culture in Bulgaria, the founding and history of the March Music Days international festival in Ruse, and a repertoire including classical, contemporary, opera-symphonic and cantata-oratorio works.

== History ==
=== Early orchestral tradition in Ruse ===
The orchestra of Ruse State Opera describes itself as the heir to the city's orchestral and concert traditions after the Liberation of Bulgaria. According to the official history of Ruse State Opera, records of performances under the name "Ruse City Philharmonic" date back to 1914. During the first decades of the twentieth century, the orchestra underwent several organisational changes according to available funding and its participation in structures such as the Lira Society and the Opera Society.

A March Music Days profile gives 2 March 1919 as the date of the first concert of the Ruse Urban Philharmonic Orchestra, while the official history of Ruse State Opera notes the earlier documentary evidence from 1914.

=== State Philharmonic Orchestra ===
The orchestra was nationalised in 1947 and on 4 January 1948 gave its first concert as the State Philharmonic Orchestra – Ruse under the baton of Konstantin Iliev. March Music Days also identifies the orchestra as founded in 1948 by Konstantin Iliev.

The orchestra developed a wide symphonic repertoire and became associated with premieres of national importance. According to the official history of Ruse State Opera, works by composers including Dmitri Shostakovich, Sergei Prokofiev, Giya Kancheli, Paul Hindemith, Richard Strauss, Parashkev Hadjiev, Konstantin Iliev, Krassimir Kyurkchiyski, Karl Jenkins and Marc-Antoine Charpentier were performed by the orchestra for the first time in Bulgaria.

In 1958 the orchestra gave the Bulgarian premiere of Shostakovich's Second Piano Concerto, conducted by Dobrin Petkov. Ruse State Opera describes the collaboration with Shostakovich and the 1958 premiere as one of the memorable events in the orchestra's history.

=== Festivals ===
The Ruse Philharmonic Orchestra was closely connected with the creation of the international festival March Music Days. The official March Music Days website states that the festival was founded in 1961 and is organised by the Municipality of Ruse. The official history of Ruse State Opera describes the orchestra, together with the Philharmonic Choir "Danube Sounds", as initiator and host of March Music Days and of the Winter Music Evenings festival.

A historical account published by Rousse.Info states that the first edition of the festival, on 10 March 1961, was held as the "Music Days of Friendship and Cultural Cooperation between Bulgaria and the GDR", with the Ruse Philharmonic as the principal participant under the conductors Ilia Temkov and Adolf Fritz Guhl.

The orchestra has also appeared at festivals including Sofia Music Weeks, New Bulgarian Music, Varna Summer and the Siena Music Weeks in Italy.

=== Siena Music Weeks and international collaborations ===
The Ruse Philharmonic Orchestra participated in the Siena Music Weeks in Italy, where it collaborated with musicians including Franco Ferrara, Carlo Maria Giulini, Gennady Rozhdestvensky, Katia Ricciarelli, Boris Belkin and Yuri Bashmet. The history page of Ruse State Opera states that the orchestra participated in the Siena Music Weeks from 1984 to 1991.

Among conductors and soloists associated with the orchestra's concert history, Ruse State Opera lists Kurt Masur, Carlo Zecchi, Dmitri Kitayenko, Kurt Sanderling, Evgeny Svetlanov, Valery Gergiev, Dmitri Shostakovich, Sviatoslav Richter, Rudolf Kehrer, Igor Oistrakh, Leonid Kogan, Ruggiero Ricci, Vladimir Spivakov, Franco Petracchi, Yuri Bashmet and Robert Cohen.

=== Administrative changes after 1999 ===
In 1999 the Ruse National Opera and the State Philharmonic Orchestra – Ruse merged into one institution, initially called the Opera and Philharmonic Society – Ruse. Since 2010 the institution has operated as Ruse State Opera. After the 1999 merger, the ensemble took on the tasks of an opera-symphony orchestra while continuing to perform symphonic and cantata-oratorio repertoire.

The name Ruse Philharmonic Orchestra remains in use for symphonic appearances of the orchestra. The Ruse State Opera history page states that the orchestra "regularly performs for the public as a symphony orchestra - the Ruse Philharmonic". The March Music Days website continues to list "Ruse Philharmonic Orchestra" among its performers and in festival programmes.

== Conductors ==
The orchestra has worked with a number of Bulgarian conductors, including Konstantin Iliev, Dobrin Petkov, Sasha Popov, Ruslan Raychev, Ilia Temkov, Alexander Vladigerov, Alipi Naydenov, Tzanko Delibozov, Georgi Dimitrov, Emil Tabakov, Nayden Todorov and Yordan Kamdzhalov.

In 1960 Sasha Popov became the first chief conductor of the orchestra under the name Ruse Philharmonic, according to a historical note published by March Music Days.

From 2005 to 2017, Nayden Todorov was director of Ruse State Opera. During this period he also served as principal conductor and worked with the Ruse symphonic ensemble, including recordings and concert projects connected with the Ruse Philharmonic name.

== Repertoire ==
The orchestra's repertoire includes classical and contemporary symphonic music, cantata-oratorio works and opera-symphonic repertoire. Ruse State Opera states that the orchestra has performed works by Shostakovich, Prokofiev, Kancheli, Hindemith, Richard Strauss, Parashkev Hadjiev, Konstantin Iliev, Krassimir Kyurkchiyski, Jenkins and Charpentier as Bulgarian premieres.

Among the large-scale works historically associated with the orchestra's repertoire are Prokofiev's Alexander Nevsky, Stravinsky's Oedipus rex, Petrushka and The Rite of Spring, Richard Strauss's Also sprach Zarathustra and Orff's Carmina Burana.

Ruse Philharmonic Orchestra

== Tours and recordings ==
The orchestra has toured internationally, including performances in Germany, Poland, Austria, Switzerland, Italy, Romania, Spain and France. Ruse State Opera also lists tours in Belgium, Portugal and other countries.

The orchestra has recordings in the archives of Bulgarian National Radio, Bulgarian National Television and Berlin Radio, and has made recordings on LP and CD for companies in Europe and the United States. March Music Days states that the orchestra released CDs for Forlane in France and Vienna Modern Masters in Austria.

Commercial recordings involving the orchestra include releases in the Music from 6 Continents series on Vienna Modern Masters, with Tzanko Delibozov and the Ruse/Rousse Philharmonic Orchestra.

== Selected recordings ==
- Music from 6 Continents (1996 Series), Vienna Modern Masters VMM3035, with the Rousse Philharmonic Orchestra and Tzanko Delibozov.
- Music from 6 Continents (1996 Series), Vienna Modern Masters VMM3037, with the Rousse Philharmonic Orchestra, Thomas Sleeper and Tzanko Delibozov.
- Vladigerov: Bulgarian Suite; Seven Symphonic Bulgarian Dances; Vardar Rhapsody, with the Ruse Philharmonic Orchestra conducted by Nayden Todorov.
- Concerto for Cathy, featuring oboist Catherine Gerardi, Albany Records.
- Reinecke, Concerto in D major, Op. 283 and Ballade, Op. 288, Music Minus One Flute.

== Institutional status ==
The Ruse Philharmonic Orchestra should not be described simply as disbanded in 2010. The independent state philharmonic institution ceased to exist as a separate administrative body after its merger with the opera in 1999, and the combined institution has operated as Ruse State Opera since 2010. The symphonic orchestra continues within Ruse State Opera, and the name Ruse Philharmonic Orchestra continues to be used for its concert activity.

== See also ==
- Ruse State Opera
- March Music Days
- Konstantin Iliev
- Dobrin Petkov
- Nayden Todorov
