= March Music Days =

Classical music festival in Bulgaria

The March Music Days (Bulgarian: Мартенски музикални дни; Martenski Muzikalni Dni) is an international classical music festival held annually in Ruse, Bulgaria. Founded in 1961, it is among the oldest international classical music festivals in Bulgaria and is organised by the Municipality of Ruse.

The festival takes place in March and presents orchestral, chamber, vocal, opera, early music, contemporary music and jazz programmes. It has been described by the European Festivals Association as one of the oldest and most significant international classical music festival stages in Bulgaria. In 2026 the festival marked its 65th edition.

== History ==
The festival was established in 1961 as an initiative of the Ruse Philharmonic Orchestra with the assistance of the Municipality of Ruse. According to the Bulgarian News Agency, it has been organised annually since 1961 and has become a meeting place for generations of musicians, ensembles and orchestras from Bulgaria and abroad.

The festival became one of the main musical events associated with Ruse's cultural identity. Its programme has included symphonic concerts, chamber music, opera productions, choral music, contemporary music, early music and crossover projects.

One of the most important events in the history of the festival was the Bulgarian premiere of Dmitri Shostakovich's opera Katerina Ismailova at Ruse State Opera in 1965. Bulgarian National Radio notes that Shostakovich spent ten days in Ruse and worked with the theatre ensemble during the preparation of the production. A digital archive of the Regional Library "Lyuben Karavelov" in Ruse preserves press material from 1965 connected with Shostakovich and the premiere.

== Programme and international profile ==
The March Music Days programme has included leading Bulgarian and international orchestras, soloists, chamber ensembles and conductors. The festival's official profile lists among its past guests Dmitri Shostakovich, Sviatoslav Richter, Kurt Masur, Gennady Rozhdestvensky, Václav Neumann, Yuri Temirkanov, Igor Oistrakh, Vadim Repin, Rudolf Barshai, Saulius Sondeckis, Neville Marriner, Yuri Bashmet, Gidon Kremer, Mischa Maisky, Krzysztof Penderecki, Dmitry Sitkovetsky and Patrick Gallois. Bulgarian artists associated with the festival have included Dobrin Petkov, Konstantin Iliev, Emil Tabakov, Vassil Kazandjiev, Nayden Todorov, Svetlin Roussev and Mincho Minchev.

The same source lists participating orchestras and ensembles such as the Bucharest Philharmonic, the Bucharest National Radio Orchestra, the St. Petersburg Philharmonic, the Lithuanian Philharmonic, Bruckner Orchestra Linz, Paris Chamber Orchestra, PKF – Prague Philharmonia, Sofia Philharmonic Orchestra, Arnold Schoenberg Choir, Sinfonia Varsovia, Kremerata Baltica, the Hilliard Ensemble, The King's Singers, I Musici di Roma, Il Giardino Armonico with Giovanni Antonini, Venice Baroque Orchestra with Giuliano Carmignola, MusikFabrik, Ensemble Recherche, Moscow Soloists, Amadinda, Kroumata, the Juilliard Quartet, the Jerusalem Quartet, the Tokyo String Quartet and the Arditti Quartet.

The festival has also been presented in the European Festivals Association's FestivalFinder platform, where it is described as a major Bulgarian classical music festival which has hosted hundreds of artists, ensembles and orchestras from Europe and around the world.

== Organisation ==
The festival is organised by the Municipality of Ruse. The European Festivals Association lists Iva Chavdarova as artistic director of the March Music Days International Festival.

In 2022 Chavdarova received the "Golden Lyre" award of the Union of Bulgarian Music and Dance Artists for her contribution to the development of Bulgarian musical culture and the March Music Days festival.

The festival has received the international "European Festival" label under the European Commission and European Festivals Association initiative "Europe for Festivals, Festivals for Europe".

== Ruse Festival Orchestra ==
The festival is associated with the Ruse Festival Orchestra, an ensemble created in connection with the National School of Arts "Prof. Veselin Stoyanov" in Ruse. According to Radio Bulgaria, the orchestra was founded in 2010 to bring together graduates of different classes of the school from around the world for its 50th anniversary.

The Ruse Festival Orchestra later became a recurring participant in the festival. Radio Bulgaria reports that since 2017 it has participated in every edition of March Music Days. In 2026 the orchestra opened the 65th edition of the festival under Emil Tabakov, with soprano Krassimira Stoyanova and pianist Nikolai Medvedev as soloists. The same edition included 80 musicians from 19 countries, according to Radio Bulgaria.

In 2025 the closing concert of the 64th edition featured Verdi's Requiem performed by the Festival Orchestra and Choir of Ruse under Emil Tabakov and choirmaster Steliyana Dimitrova-Hernani.

== Recent editions ==
The 64th edition of the festival opened on 14 March 2025 with the Ruse Philharmonic conducted by Nayden Todorov, with cellist Andrei Ionita and violinist Alexander Sitkovetsky as soloists. According to the Bulgarian News Agency, the 2025 festival included 23 concerts, 10 sideline events and artists from 16 countries on three continents.

The 65th edition opened on 13 March 2026 with the Ruse Festival Orchestra under Emil Tabakov. The programme was announced as including 18 concerts with artists from 12 countries.
