= Ruse Opera and Philharmonic Society =

Opera company based in Ruse, Bulgaria

Coordinates: 43°50′53″N 25°57′24″E

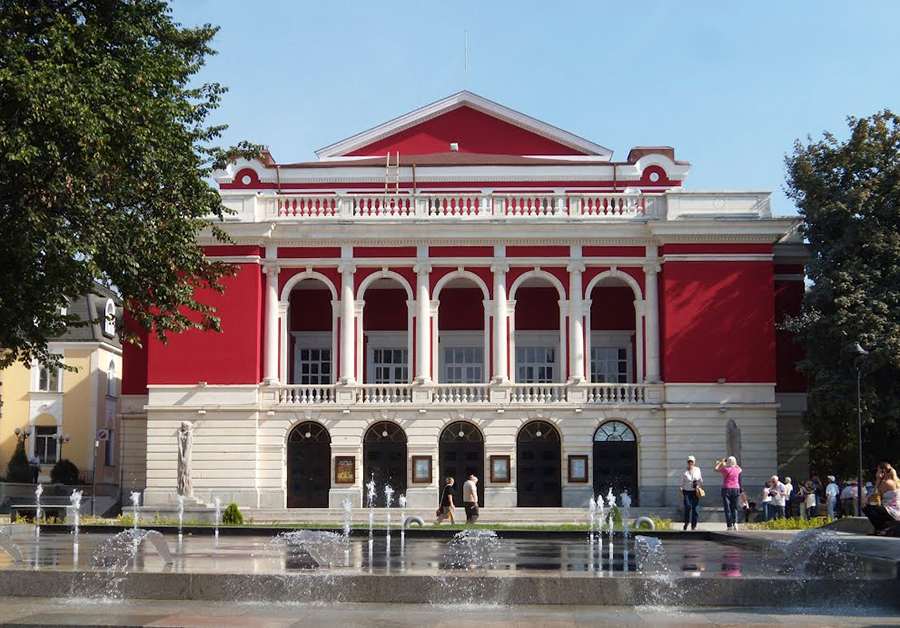
Rousse Opera

The Ruse Opera and Philharmonic Society is an opera company based in Ruse, Bulgaria, and founded in 1949. It took over the Rousse Opera Society, which had been created in 1914. The new company is one of the oldest state cultural institutions in Bulgaria. With a staff of schooled singers, a choir, the ballet, and the orchestra, there is maturity and the ability to perform a wide range of works.

The company's repertoire ranges from the classics (Mozart through Verdi and Puccini to Stravinsky and Shostakovich) and has included 195 different works for the stage, some of them having received their Bulgarian premieres at the Ruse.

Over the years numerous famous singers have sung on the Ruse opera stage, including Elena Nikolai, Todor Mazarov, Nicolai Ghiaurov, Raina Kabaivanska, Nicola Giuselev, Anna Tomowa-Sintow, Ghena Dimitrova, Stefka Evstatieva, Orlin Anastassov, Valerie Popova, Gloria Lind, Alexandrina Milcheva, Vladimir Atlantov, Stefan Dimitrov, Ivan Konsulov, Ava Cooper, Peter Glossop, Zinaida Pali, Silvia Shash, Kaludi Kaludov, Mariana Zvetkova, and Nicolae Herlia. Since 1956, the company has toured in Romania and Italy, Spain, Holland, France, Ukraine, Greece, Belgium, Luxembourg, and Cyprus and Rhodes islands. Rousse Opera Theatre has also recorded a number of performances for Bulgarian Radio and for separate CD compilations.

== Repertoire ==
La traviata in Rousse State Opera

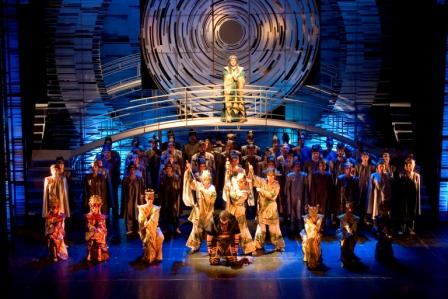
Turandot in the Rousse State Opera

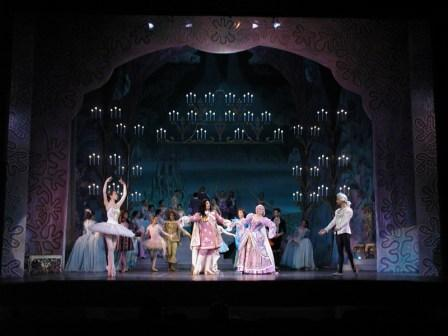
Sleeping Beauty in Rousse State Opera

Operas not frequently performed and which are now part of the standard repertoire have included:

- Rossini - La Gazza Ladra
- Rossini - L`Italiana in Algeri
- Verdi - Stiffelio
- Glinka - Ivan Sussanin
- Mozart - Bastien and Bastiene
- Smetana - Prodana Nevesta
- Gershwin - Blue Monday
- Gershwin - Porgi and Bess
- Stravinsky - Oedipus Rex

== Ballet ==
Choreographers such as Asen Gavrilov, Asen Manolov, Peter Loukanov, Hikmet Mehmedov, Antal Fodor, Giancarlo Vantagio, Alain Bernard worked here.

== The Opera and Philharmonic Society ==
The Rousse Opera and Philharmonic Society was established in 1999, joining the Rousse Opera Theatre and Rousse Philharmonic Orchestra. It presents opera and ballet as well as symphonic works.

The Opera and Philharmonic Society uses two halls: a Concert Hall, equipped with a recording studio, and an Opera House. Both halls have more than 600 seats each. The Opera and Philharmonic Society possesses the technical means for producing theatrical scenery.

== General Music Director ==
The general music director of both the Opera House and the Rousse Philharmonic Orchestra, Plamen Beykov, graduated from the Royal College of Music in London, further advanced his art of vocal performance under the supervision of Boris Christoff in Rome, and also studied Musical Stage Direction at the National Academy of Music in Sofia. For more than ten seasons he was as a soloist/artist-in-residence at Ruse State Opera. He has performed at prestigious venues in Spain, Russia and Japan. Plamen Beykov also directed various productions for the opera theaters in Ruse and Stara Zagora.

Past directors of the house include artists like Plamen Kartalov, Michail Angelov, Georgi Dimitrov and Nayden Todorov.
