= Vittoria Yeo =

South Korean soprano (born 1980)

- Born: 20 December 1980 (age 45); Seoul, South Korea
- Education: Seokyeong University
- Occupation: Soprano

Korean name
- Hangul: 여지원
- RR: Yeo Jiwon
- MR: Yŏ Chiwŏn

Vittoria Yeo (born 20 December 1980) is a South Korean soprano.

== Early life and training ==
Yeo was born in Seoul, South Korea, where she started her musical studies and graduated in opera singing at the Seokyeong University in Seoul.

She moved to Italy for continuing her training at the Arrigo Boito Conservatory in Parma, the Accademia Chigiana in Siena and finally with Raina Kabaivanska at the Istituto Musicale Vecchi-Tonelli in Modena. She has won a number of international singing competitions, including the Città di Magenta, the Città di Brescia and La Città Sonora, as well as the Ismaele Voltolini, the Magda Olivero, the Pietro Mongini and the Maria Malibran Competitions.

== Career ==
Following her appearances as Musetta in La bohème and Gilda in Rigoletto in youth productions at the Teatro Regio in Parma and as Leonora Il trovatore in a concert performance at the Sarzana Opera Festival, Yeo made her debut as Cio-Cio-San in Madama Butterfly in 2013 at the theatres in Salsomaggiore Terme, Vigevano and Fiorenzuola d'Arda.

She also sang her first Lady Macbeth in Macbeth directed by Cristina Mazzavillani Muti at the Ravenna Festival in 2013. At Savonlinna Opera Festival in Finland she performed Lady Macbeth during summer 2016. She made her role debuts as Fiordiligi in Così fan tutte and as Liù in Turandot in 2014. In 2015, she made her Salzburg Festival debut by singing her first Elvira in Verdi's Ernani (concert performance under the direction of Riccardo Muti).

Yeo has already performed extensively in concert, appearing with the Filarmonica Arturo Toscanini, the Bulgarian National Philharmonic and the Orchestra of the Teatro Regio in Parma under the baton of Nayden Todorov. She took part in Pavarotti nel cuore in 2011, a concert marking the anniversary of the death of Luciano Pavarotti, and in 2013 she appeared in a bel canto concert at the Luciano Pavarotti Foundation. In 2014, along with other finalists of the Città di Busseto International Competition for Verdian Voices, she sang in a concert at the Teatro Regio in Parma, as well as in a celebration of Rolando Panerai's 90th birthday at the Teatro Goldoni in Florence.
