= Rite of Spring (disambiguation) =

The Rite of Spring is a 1913 ballet and orchestral concert work by Igor Stravinsky.

Rite(s) of Spring may also refer to:

== Music ==
- The Rite of Spring (MacMillan), a 1962 ballet by Kenneth MacMillan
- The Rite of Spring (Hubert Laws album), 1971
- The Rite of Spring (The Bad Plus album), 2014
- "Rite of Spring", a song by Angels & Airwaves from I-Empire, 2007
- Rites of Spring, an American post-hardcore band
  - Rites of Spring (album), the debut eponymous release by the band

== Film ==
- Rite of Spring (film), a 1963 Portuguese film by Manoel de Oliveira
- Rites of Spring (film), a 2011 American horror film
- The Rite of Spring (film), a 2022 Spanish film

== Other uses ==
- "A Rite of Spring", a science fiction short story by Fritz Leiber
- La consagración de la primavera (The Rite of Spring) (1978), a novel by Alejo Carpentier
- Rites Of Spring: The Great War and the Birth of the Modern Age (1989), a historical book by Modris Eksteins

== See also ==
- The Rite of Spring discography
- The Rite of Strings, an album by Al Di Meola, Stanley Clarke, and Jean-Luc Ponty
- Beneath the Trees Where Nobody Sees: Rite of Spring, 2025 comic book miniseries by Patrick Horvath
