= The Rite of Spring discography =

This is a sound and video discography of Igor Stravinsky's ballet The Rite of Spring. The work was premiered in Paris on May 29, 1913, at the Théâtre des Champs-Élysées. It was presented by Sergei Diaghilev's Ballets Russes with choreography by Vaslav Nijinsky and was conducted by Pierre Monteux. The list includes many of the most noted recordings of the work but is by no means exhaustive. The avant-garde character of the music, combined with Nijinsky's innovative choreography, caused a near riot at the first performance. It has since gained wide acceptance both as a ballet and as a concert piece.

The discography is not exhaustive; new recordings frequently appear, as do reissues of older recordings. In the tables, the year given is not necessarily an accurate guide to the time of the actual performance, since sometimes recordings are held for many years before release.

On BBC Radio 3's Building a Library, music critics have several times surveyed recordings of The Rite of Spring. On 22 March 2008 Rob Cowan recommended the 2004 recording by the Junge Deutsche Philharmonie, Péter Eötvös (conductor), as the best available choice. On 6 July 2019 Jonathan Cross chose the version by Esa-Pekka Salonen and the Philharmonia Orchestra as his recommendation.

The Columbia Symphony Orchestra/Igor Stravinsky version from 1960 is the recording that was sent into space as part of the Voyager Golden Record.

== Discography ==
=== Audio recordings: (orchestral) ===
Year	Orchestra	Conductor	Label and format	Notes	References
1928	Hollywood Bowl Orchestra	Eugène Goossens	Cambria CD (2004)	Recording of rehearsals for west coast premiere, August 1928	
1929	Orchestre Symphonique de Paris	Pierre Monteux	HMV; 78 rpm (4 discs); Pearl CD (release date not indicated)	First recording	
1929	Walther Straram Concerts Orchestra	Igor Stravinsky	Columbia; 78 rpm (5 discs); Pearl CD (release date not indicated)	Recorded 4 months after Monteux's version	
1930	Philadelphia Orchestra	Leopold Stokowski	Victor; 78 rpm (4 discs); Sony CD (2013)	First US recording	
1939–40	Philadelphia Orchestra	Leopold Stokowski		Abridged and adapted for Walt Disney's Fantasia	
1940	New York Philharmonic	Igor Stravinsky	Columbia/CBS; 78 rpm (4 discs). Sony CD (2013)		
1945	San Francisco Symphony Orchestra	Pierre Monteux	RCA Vinyl		
1946	Concertgebouw Orchestra	Eduard van Beinum	Decca; 78 rpm		
1950	Orchestre de la Suisse Romande	Ernest Ansermet	Stravinsky: Le Sacre du printemps: 100th Anniversary Collector's Edition CD (2012)		
1951	Boston Symphony Orchestra	Pierre Monteux	RCA mono LP; Sony CD (2013)	Inducted into the Grammy Hall of Fame in 1993.	
1951	Philharmonia Orchestra	Igor Markevich	HMV mono LP; Testament CD (2004)	First British recording	
1951	New York Philharmonic	Leonard Bernstein	Leonard Bernstein: Historic Broadcasts, 1946–1961 CD (2013)	Recorded live in Chicago, 1951	
1952	Deutsches Symphonie-Orchester Berlin	Igor Markevich	Audite CD		
1953	Minneapolis Symphony Orchestra	Antal Dorati	Mercury Records; LP; The Dorati Edition CD (2012)		
1953	Pittsburgh Symphony Orchestra	William Steinberg	Capitol Stereo LP		
1954	RIAS Symphonie-Orchester Berlin	Ferenc Fricsay	Deutsche Grammophon LP		
1955	Philadelphia Orchestra	Eugene Ormandy	Columbia/CBS; LP; Sony CD (2013)	Uses 1943 version of Danse sacrale	
1955	Orchestre National de France	Pierre Monteux	Pierre Monteux in France CD (2012)	Live 1955	
1956	Paris Conservatoire Orchestra	Pierre Monteux	RCA Victor		
1956	Orchestre National de l'O.R.T.F.	Jean Martinon	Ina CD	Live March 1956	
1956	Orchestra des Cento Soli	Rudolf Albert	Stravinsky: Le Sacre du printemps: 100th Anniversary Collector's Edition CD (2012)		
1957	Orchestre de la Suisse Romande	Ernest Ansermet	Decca mono/stereo LP: Decca CD (1999)		
1957	Orchestre National de l'O.R.T.F.	Lorin Maazel	Ina CD	Live January 1957	
1957	Baden Baden Radio Symphony	Jascha Horenstein	Vox LP	Reissued as a recording by the "Vienna Festival Orchestra & Albert Wolff"	
1958	New York Philharmonic	Leonard Bernstein	Columbia/CBS; LP. Sony CD and LP (2013)		
1958	NDR Sinfonie Orchester	Igor Stravinsky	Arkadia CD (1992)	Live 1958	
1959	Minneapolis Symphony Orchestra	Antal Dorati	Mercury Living Presence		
1959	Philharmonia Orchestra	Igor Markevich	EMI LP		
1959	Czech Philharmonic Orchestra	Igor Markevich	The Prague Spring Festival CD (2006)	Live 1959	
1960	Columbia Symphony Orchestra	Igor Stravinsky	Columbia/CBS mono/stereo LP: Sony CD (2013)	Uses 1943 version of Danse sacrale	
1960	Czech Philharmonic Orchestra	Karel Ancerl	Supraphon LP		
1960	London Symphony Orchestra	Eugene Goossens	Everest mono/stereo LP; Everest CD (2008)		
1960	Royal Philharmonic Orchestra	René Leibowitz	Reader's Digest stereo LP. Chesky Records CD (1993)	Recorded as "London Festival Orchestra"	
1962	USSR State Symphony Orchestra	Robert Craft	Akkord stereo LP		
1962	Dresden Staatskapelle	Otmar Suitner	Eterna Stereo LP		
1962	London Symphony Orchestra	Igor Markevich	BBC Legends CD	Live at the Edinburgh Festival, 1962	
1962	Warsaw Philharmonic Orchestra	Igor Markevich	Warsaw Philharmonic Archive CD	Live, January 1962	
1963	Berlin Philharmonic Orchestra	Herbert von Karajan	Deutsche Grammophon mono/stereo LP. DG CD (2007)		
1963	Czech Philharmonic Orchestra	Karel Ančerl	Supraphon stereo LP; Supraphon CD (2002)		
1963	Orchestre National de l'O.R.T.F.	Pierre Boulez	Concert Hall stereo LP		
1963	London Symphony Orchestra	Pierre Monteux	BBC Radio Broadcast	Recorded on May 29, 1963; 50th anniversary of premiere (The orchestra was prepared by David Zinman)	
1963	London Symphony Orchestra	Colin Davis	Philips LP		
1966	USSR Symphony Orchestra	Yevgeny Svetlanov	Melodiya; LP		
1966	Orchestra Sinfonica Nazionale della RAI di Milano	Bruno Maderna	STR LP		
1967	Philharmonia Orchestra	Rafael Frühbeck de Burgos	EMI stereo LP.		
1967	Polish Radio Symphony Orchestra	Bohdan Wodiczko	Polskie Nagrania Stereo LP		
1968	Chicago Symphony Orchestra	Seiji Ozawa	RCA stereo LP. Sony CD (2013)		
1969	Plovdiv State Philharmonic	Dobrin Petkov	DDD CD		
1969	The Cleveland Orchestra	Pierre Boulez	Columbia/CBS stereo LP. Sony CD (2005)		
1969	Los Angeles Philharmonic	Zubin Mehta	Decca stereo LP		
1970	Orchestre National de Belgique	Andre Vandernoot	Soundtrack	Used as the background recording for Maurice Bejart's 'Sacre du Printemps' film (1970)	
1971	New England Conservatory Symphony Orchestra	Gunther Schuller	NEC stereo LP	Recorded live October 1971	
1972	London Symphony Orchestra	Leonard Bernstein	Columbia/CBS; LP. Sony CD (2013)	(Bernstein Century Collection)	
1972	Boston Symphony Orchestra	Michael Tilson Thomas	Deutsche Grammophon LP		
1972	Berlin Philharmonic Orchestra	Herbert von Karajan	Testament CD (2009)	Recorded live, May 1972	
1973	London Philharmonic Orchestra	Bernard Haitink	Philips; LP		
1973	London Philharmonic Orchestra	Erich Leinsdorf	London Records LP		
1974	Chicago Symphony Orchestra	Sir Georg Solti	Decca		
1974	Vienna Philharmonic Orchestra	Lorin Maazel	London Records Stereo LP		
1975	London Symphony Orchestra	Claudio Abbado	Deutsche Grammophon stereo LP.		
1976	Concertgebouw Orchestra	Colin Davis	Philips stereo LP. Philips CD (2003)		
1976	ORF Symphonieorchester	Leif Segerstam	ORF LP		
1977	Berlin Philharmonic Orchestra	Herbert von Karajan	Deutsche Grammophon stereo LP. DG CD (2000)		
1977	National Youth Orchestra of Great Britain	Sir Simon Rattle	Academy Sound and Vision; CD		
1977	Minnesota Orchestra	Stanislaw Skrowaczewski	Candide Stereo LP		
1977	Tanglewood Music Center Orchestra	Seiji Ozawa	Boston Symphony Orchestra Archives	Recorded Live July 28, 1977	
1978	New York Philharmonic	Zubin Mehta	CBS Masterworks stereo LP, quadrophonic LP, 4-Track Reel-to-reel		
1978	Berlin Philharmonic Orchestra	Herbert von Karajan	Palexa Records Audio CD (2004)	Recorded live, 1978	
1978	London Symphony Orchestra	Eduardo Mata	RCA LP		
1979	Boston Symphony Orchestra	Seiji Ozawa	Philips LP		[37]
1979	Philadelphia Orchestra	Riccardo Muti	EMI/Angel stereo LP. EMI CD (2002)		
1980	The Cleveland Orchestra	Lorin Maazel	Telarc stereo LP: Telarc CD (2005)		
1980	Japan Philharmonic Orchestra	Igor Markevich	Japan Philharmonic Orchestra CD	Live November 1980	
1981	Detroit Symphony Orchestra	Antal Dorati	Decca/London stereo LP; CD	Winner, Grand Prix du Disque; First digital recording of the work	
1981	Moscow Radio Symphony Orchestra	Vladimir Fedoseyev	HMV Melodiya Concert Classics LP		
1981	Czech Philharmonic Orchestra	Zdenek Kosler	Supraphon LP		
1982	Israel Philharmonic Orchestra	Leonard Bernstein	Deutsche Grammophon stereo LP; DG Virtuoso CD (2012)		
1982	Orchestre de la Suisse Romande	Igor Markevich	Cascavelle CD		
1982	Toronto Symphony Orchestra	Andrew Davis	Orpheum Masters CD		
1984	Montreal Symphony Orchestra	Charles Dutoit	Decca; CD		
1985	The Cleveland Orchestra	Riccardo Chailly	London CD		
1985	Vienna Philharmonic Orchestra	Zubin Mehta	Orfeo International Music CD	Live August 21, 1985	
1987	City of Birmingham Symphony Orchestra	Simon Rattle	EMI; CD		
1987	London Philharmonic Orchestra	Charles Mackerras	EMI; CD		
1987	Swedish Radio Symphony Orchestra	Sixten Ehrling	BIS CD		
1987	Orchestre de Paris	Daniel Barenboim	Erato CD		
1987	London Symphony Orchestra	Gennady Rozhdestvensky	Nimbus Records CD		
1987	Tanglewood Music Center Orchestra	Leonard Bernstein	Boston Symphony Orchestra Archives	Recorded Live August 11, 1987	
1987	Orchestra of the National Theatre Prague	Allan Lewis	Soundtrack	Used as background recording for the Joffrey Ballet's video of reconstructed choreography	
1988	London Symphony Orchestra	Rafael Frühbeck de Burgos	Collins Classics CD		
1988	Joven Orquesta Nacional de España	Edmon Colomer	Harmonia Mundi France CD		
1989	Philharmonia Orchestra	Esa-Pekka Salonen	Sony Classical CD		
1990	Boston Philharmonic Orchestra; Rex Lawson (pianola)	Benjamin Zander	Innovative Music Productions; CD	Piano roll version from 1921	
1990	BRT Philharmonic Orchestra, Brussels	Alexander Rahbari	Naxos; CD		
1990	Philharmonia Orchestra	Eliahu Inbal	Teldec CD		
1990	New York Philharmonic	Zubin Mehta	Telarc Digital CD		
1990	Sinfonieorchester Des Südwestfunks	Ernest Bour	Naïve classique CD (2016)		
1990	Saint Louis Symphony Orchestra	Leonard Slatkin	RCA Victor CD		
1991	Atlanta Symphony Orchestra	Yoel Levi	Telarc; CD		
1991	Cleveland Orchestra	Pierre Boulez	Deutsche Grammophon; CD		
1991	Dallas Symphony Orchestra	Eduardo Mata	Dorian Recordings CD		
1991	Concertgebouw Orchestra	Sir Georg Solti	Decca CD	Recorded live	
1991	Orchestra of St. Luke's	Robert Craft	MusicMasters Classics CD		
1992	Metropolitan Opera Orchestra	James Levine	Polygram Records CD		
1992	London Philharmonic Orchestra	Kent Nagano	Virgin; CD		
1992	City of Birmingham Symphony Orchestra	Simon Rattle	Soundtrack	Used as background recording for BBC's "Rattle's Rite" (1992)	
1993	Oslo Philharmonic	Mariss Jansons	EMI Classics CD		
1993	Orchestre National de Bordeaux-Aquitaine	Alain Lombard	Valois CD		
1993	Orchestre Philharmonique des Pays de Loire	Marc Soustrot	Forlane CD		
1993	Redwood Symphony	Eric Kujawsky	Clarity Recordings CD		
1993	Royal Philharmonic Orchestra	Yuri Simonov	Centurion Music CD		
1994	Deutsche Symphonie Orchester Berlin	Vladimir Ashkenazy	Decca CD		
1994	Orchestre de la Suisse Romande	Neeme Jarvi	Chandos CD		
1994	BBC National Orchestra Of Wales	David Atherton	BBC Music Magazine CD	Live at the BBC Proms August 22, 1994	
1995	London Symphony Orchestra	Robert Craft	Naxos; CD	1913 version	
1995	Berlin Philharmonic Orchestra	Bernard Haitink	Philips CD		
1996	San Francisco Symphony	Michael Tilson Thomas	RCA/BMG; CD		
1996	Minnesota Orchestra	Eiji Oue	Reference Recordings CD		
1996	Rotterdam Philharmonic Orchestra	Valery Gergiev	Radio Broadcast		
1997	Pasadena Symphony Orchestra	Jorge Mester	Newport Classics CD	A binaural recording	
1997	Yale Symphony Orchestra	Shinik Hahm	Yale Symphony Orchestra Archives	Live February 8, 1997	
1998	Symphonieorchester Des Bayerischen Rundfunks	Lorin Maazel	Br Klassik CD		
1998	Tanglewood Music Center Orchestra	Robert Spano	Boston Symphony Orchestra Archives	Recorded live August 1, 1998	
1999	Kirov Orchestra	Valery Gergiev	Philips; CD		
2000	Oregon Symphony	James DePriest	Telarc CD		
2000	Chicago Symphony Orchestra	Daniel Barenboim	Teldec CD		
2001	Peabody Symphony Orchestra	Hajime Teri Murai	Peabody Conservatory Archives	Live February 6, 2001	
2002	Yale Symphony Orchestra	Shinik Hahm	Yale Symphony Orchestra Archives	Live October 13, 2002	
2003	Tanglewood Music Center Orchestra	Rafael Frühbeck de Burgos	Boston Symphony Orchestra Archives	Recorded Live July 29, 2003	
2004	Junge Deutsche Philharmonie	Péter Eötvös	BMC Records; CD		
2004	Cincinnati Symphony Orchestra	Paavo Jarvi	Telarc CD		
2004	Iceland Symphony Orchestra	Vladimir Ashkenazy	Exton CD		
2004	San Francisco Symphony	Michael Tilson Thomas	SFS CD	Keeping Score Soundtrack	
2005	Swedish Radio Symphony Orchestra	Valery Gergiev	Radio Broadcast		
2006	Los Angeles Philharmonic	Esa-Pekka Salonen	Deutsche Grammophon; CD		
2006	Netherlands Radio Philharmonic	Jaap Van Zweden	Exton CD		
2007	SWR Symphony Orchestra, Baden-Baden	Sylvain Cambreling	SWR Music CD		
2007	Philharmonia Orchestra	Robert Craft	Naxos CD		
2007	Baltimore Symphony Orchestra	Marin Alsop	BSO Live ITunes	Recorded live	
2007	Orchestre Philharmonique du France	Myung-Whun Chung	Deutsche Grammophon; CD		
2007	New York Philharmonic	Zubin Mehta	Deutsche Grammophon; CD	Live January 2007	
2008	Concertgebouw Orchestra	Mariss Jansons	RCO Live; CD		
2008	Bergen Philharmonic Orchestra	Andrew Litton	BIS SACD		
2009	National Youth Orchestra of Canada	Alain Trudel	NYOC CD		
2009	Duisburger Philharmoniker	Jonathan Darlington	ACOUSENCE ACO-CD CD	Rec Live September 2009	
2009	Concertgebouw Orchestra	Zubin Mehta	Radio Broadcast	Rec Live	
2010	Simon Bolivar Youth Orchestra of Venezuela	Gustavo Dudamel	Deutsche Grammophon; CD		
2010	Budapest Festival Orchestra	Iván Fischer	Channel Classics; CD		
2010	Orchestre philharmonique de Monte-Carlo	Yakov Kreizberg	OPMC Classics CD		
2010	St. Petersburg Philharmonic Orchestra	Yuri Temirkanov	Signum Classics CD		
2011	Bergen Philharmonic Orchestra	Andrew Litton	BIS SACD		
2011	DuPage Symphony Orchestra	Barbara Schubert	Internet Archive	Rec live May 14, 2011	
2011	Orchestre National de France	Daniele Gatti	Sony Classical CD	Recorded July 2011 but not released until 2013	
2011	Orchestre National du Capitole de Toulouse	Tugan Sokhiev	Naive CD		
2012	Budapest Festival Orchestra	Ivan Fischer	Channel SACD		
2012	American Symphony Orchestra	Leon Botstein	ASO CD/MP3		
2012	Berliner Philharmoniker	Sir Simon Rattle	EMI Classics / Warner Classics; CD, 44 kHz/24bit FLAC	Recorded in concert	
2012	Orchestre de l'Opera National de Paris	Philippe Jordan	Naïve CD		
2012	New York Philharmonic	Alan Gilbert	NYP MP3	Recorded in concert September 2012	
2013	Philadelphia Orchestra	Yannick Nézet-Séguin	Deutsche Grammophon; CD, 96 kHz/24bit FLAC		
2013	Tonhalle Orchester Zürich	David Zinman	RCA Red Seal CD	Contains the original 1913 version and final 1967 version	
2013	Les Siècles	François-Xavier Roth	Mecenat Musicale CD	1913 version performed on period instruments	
2013	Sinfonieorchester Basel	Dennis Russell Davies	SOB CD		
2014	Seattle Symphony Orchestra	Ludovic Morlot	Seattle Symphony CD	Rec Live June 2014	
2015	Park Avenue Chamber Symphony	David Bernard	Recursive Classics CD		
2015	MusicAeterna	Teodor Currentzis	Sony Classical CD		
2015	Radio-Sinfonie-Orchester Frankfurt	Andrés Orozco-Estrada	Pentatone CD		
2016	Sydney Symphony Orchestra	David Robertson	ABC Classics CD		
2017	Concertgebouw Orchestra	Daniele Gatti	RCO Live; CD		
2018	Lucerne Festival Orchestra	Riccardo Chailly	Decca CD		
2018	NDR Elbphilharmonie Orchestra	Krzysztof Urbanski	Alpha CD		
2021	Orchestre de Paris	Pablo Heras-Casado	Harmonia Mundi CD		
2022	London Symphony Orchestra	Sir Simon Rattle	LSO Live SACD		
2022	London Philharmonic Orchestra	Vladimir Jurowski	LPO CD		
2023	Orchestre de Paris	Klaus Mäkelä	Decca CD		

=== Audio recordings: (derivative) ===
Year of recording/issue	Orchestra/Performer	Conductor	Label and format	Notes	References
1983	Larry Coryell		Philips; LP, CD	Solo steel-string guitar version arranged and performed by Larry Coryell, performed on Ovation Elite model.	
2009	Various	Various	Macro Recordings; CD	Digital edit by Stefan Goldmann combining 14 different recorded orchestral versions in 144 edited segments.	
2014	The Bad Plus		Masterworks; CD	Jazz trio interpretation by The Bad Plus.	
2020	Joe Parrish		Self-released; Digital	Electric guitar transcription by Joe Parrish	

=== Audio recordings: piano versions ===
Year of recording/issue	Performers	Label and format	Notes	References
1969	Eden and Tamir (Bracha Edan; Alexander Tamir)	Decca LP	4-hand piano version	
uncertain	Mayumi Kameda; Jean Jacques Balet	Cypres CD	4-hand piano version	
1977	Ronald Farren-Price; Rosslyn Farren-Price	Move Records LP	4-hand piano version	
uncertain	Nikolai Petrov; Alexander Ghinden	Melodiya CD	4-hand piano version	
1979	Dickran Atamian	Delos CD	2 hands version arr. Sam Raphling	
1981	Michael Tilson Thomas; Ralph Grierson	EMI/Seraphim LP; EMI CD (2002)	4-hand piano version	
1987	Dag Achatz	BIS CD	piano 2 hands, arr. Dag Achatz	
after 1994	Tamriko Siprashvili; Mark Anderson	Nimbus CD	4-hand piano version	
1995	Benjamin Frith; Peter Hill	Naxos CD	4-hand piano version	
2001	Fazil Say	Teldec Classics CD	4-hand piano version	
2007	Philip Moore; Simon Crawford-Phillips	Deux-Elles CD	4-hand piano version	
2007	Bugallo-Williams Piano Duo	Wergo CD	4-hand piano version	
2008	GrauSchumacher Piano Duo	Neos CD	4-hand piano version	
2009	David Nettle; Richard Martin	Netmark CD	4-hand piano version	
2010	Fiona York; John York	Nimbus CD	4-hand piano version	
2010	Malcolm Wilson; Philip Martin	Somm CD	4-hand piano version	
2012	Eva-Maria Zimmermann; Keisuke Nakagoshi	Dorian Sono Luminus CD	4-hand piano version	
2014	Martha Argerich Daniel Barenboim	Deutsche Grammophon CD	Version for two pianos	
2015	Jean-Efflam Bavouzet François-Frédéric Guy	Chandos CD	4-hand piano version	
2018	Marc-André Hamelin Leif Ove Andsnes	Hyperion CD	4-hand piano version	

=== Video recordings ===
Year of recording/issue	Orchestra/Ballet company	Conductor	Label and format	Notes	References
1966	London Symphony Orchestra	Leonard Bernstein	ICA DVD released 2012	Video recording of BBC concert 27 November 1966	
1990	Moscow Classical Ballet and Orchestra	Pavel Sorokin	VAI DVD released 2010	Choreography by Natalia Kasatkina and Vladimir Vasilev	
1993	London Symphony Orchestra	Pierre Boulez	Image Entertainment DVD	Recorded at the Alte Oper Frankfurt	
1993	Berliner Philharmoniker	Bernard Haitink	Arthaus Musik DVD released 2010	Recording of Royal Albert Hall Concert 1993	
2006	San Francisco Symphony Orchestra	Michael Tilson Thomas	Avie DVD		
2008	BBC Symphony Orchestra	Pierre Boulez	Medici Arts DVD	Video recording of BBC concert (date uncertain)	
2009	Gewandhausorchester Leipzig; Leipzig Ballet	Henrik Schaefer	Medici Arts DVD	Choreography and design by Uwe Scholz	
2009	Mariinsky Orchestra & Ballet	Valery Gergiev	Bel Air Classiques DVD and Blu-ray	Reconstruction of original Nijinsky choreography	

== Notes and references ==
Citations

Book source

- Hill, Peter (2004). Stravinsky: The Rite of Spring. Cambridge: Cambridge University Press. ISBN 0-521-62714-1.
