= Stefan Dimitrov =

Stefan Dimitrov may refer to:

- Stefan Dimitrov (bass) (1939–2004), Bulgarian basso opera singer
- Stefan Dimitrov (footballer) (born 1984), Bulgarian footballer
- Stefan Dimitrov (politician) (born 1966), Bulgarian diplomat
- Stefan Dimitrov (volleyball) (born 1956), Bulgarian former volleyball player
- Stefan Dimitrov (weightlifter) (1957–2011), Bulgarian weightlifter
- Stefan Dimitrov (revolutionary) Bulgarian revolutionary, see Ivan Naumov
