= Raina Kabaivanska =

Bulgarian opera singer (born 1934)

Raina Kabaivanska OMRI
- Райна Кабаиванска
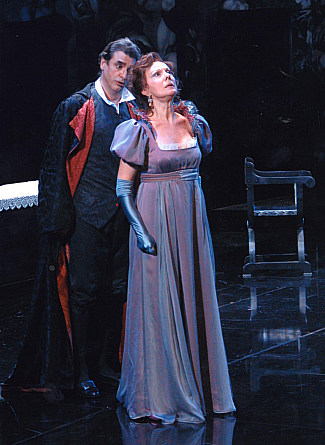
- Kabaivanska as Tosca with Enrique Baquerizo in Madrid, 2004
- Born: Raina Yakimova Kabaivanska; 15 December 1934 (age 91); Burgas, Kingdom of Bulgaria
- Citizenship: Bulgaria and Italy
- Education: Bulgarian State Conservatoire
- Occupations: Operatic soprano; academic teacher
- Years active: 1957–present
- Awards: Order of Merit of the Italian Republic; Order of Stara Planina
- Website: rainakabaivanska.net

Raina Yakimova Kabaivanska (Bulgarian: Райна Якимова Кабаиванска; born 15 December 1934) is a Bulgarian operatic soprano and singing teacher. She is regarded as one of the leading lirico-spinto sopranos of her generation, particularly associated with Verdi and Puccini, while also singing a broad repertory of Italian, French, Russian and twentieth-century roles. Her international career has included appearances at La Scala, the Royal Opera House, the Metropolitan Opera, the Vienna State Opera, the Bolshoi Theatre, the Paris Opera, Teatro Colón, the Lyric Opera of Chicago and other major opera houses.

== Early life and education ==
Kabaivanska was born in Burgas, Bulgaria. She studied in Sofia with Prokopova and Yosifov and graduated from the Bulgarian State Conservatoire, where she trained as both singer and pianist. She made her stage debut at the Bulgarian National Opera in Sofia in 1957 as Tatiana in Tchaikovsky's Eugene Onegin.

In 1958 she went to Italy for further study. She worked in Milan and Vercelli with Zita Fumagalli-Riva and Giulia Tess, and her Italian training became decisive for her later vocal and theatrical style.

== Operatic career ==
Kabaivanska's Italian breakthrough came in Fano as Nedda in Leoncavallo's Pagliacci. In 1961 she made her debut at La Scala in Milan as Agnese in Bellini's Beatrice di Tenda, opposite Joan Sutherland.

In 1962 she made her debut at the Royal Opera House, Covent Garden, as Desdemona in Verdi's Otello, and at the Metropolitan Opera in New York as Nedda in Pagliacci. She subsequently appeared at leading theatres including the Bolshoi Theatre in Moscow, Teatro Colón in Buenos Aires, the Paris Opera, the Vienna State Opera, the Budapest Opera, the Lyric Opera of Chicago, the San Francisco Opera, the Dallas Opera and the Teatro dell'Opera di Roma.

Her Italian career included appearances in Genoa, Venice, Parma, Turin, Bologna, Modena, Rome and Verona. In 1973 she sang Elena in Verdi's I vespri siciliani in Turin in a production directed by Maria Callas and Giuseppe Di Stefano.

Kabaivanska became particularly associated with heroines in the operas of Verdi and Puccini, including Desdemona, Violetta, Leonora, Elisabetta, Mimì, Cio-Cio-San, Liù, Manon Lescaut and Tosca. Her repertory also included roles by Umberto Giordano, Francesco Cilea, Riccardo Zandonai, Alfredo Catalani, Gaetano Donizetti, Jules Massenet, Charles Gounod, Gaspare Spontini, Christoph Willibald Gluck, Richard Strauss, Leoš Janáček, Kurt Weill and Tchaikovsky.

== Opera films and later appearances ==
Kabaivanska appeared in several opera films and filmed performances, including Pagliacci opposite Jon Vickers in 1968, Il trovatore opposite Franco Bonisolli in 1975 and Tosca opposite Plácido Domingo in 1976.

On 8 September 2007 she sang the "Ave Maria" from Verdi's Otello at the funeral mass for Luciano Pavarotti in Modena. In 2008 she appeared as the Countess in Tchaikovsky's The Queen of Spades at the Théâtre du Capitole in Toulouse.

== Selected repertory ==
Kabaivanska's repertory has included Verdi roles such as Desdemona in Otello, Violetta in La traviata, Leonora in Il trovatore, Elisabetta in Don Carlos, Elena in I vespri siciliani and Elvira in Ernani. Her Puccini roles have included Mimì in La bohème, Cio-Cio-San in Madama Butterfly, Liù in Turandot, Tosca in Tosca and Manon Lescaut in Manon Lescaut. Other roles included Maddalena in Giordano's Andrea Chénier, Adriana in Cilea's Adriana Lecouvreur, Francesca in Zandonai's Francesca da Rimini, Julia in Spontini's La Vestale, Emilia Marty in Janáček's The Makropulos Case, Lisa and the Countess in Tchaikovsky's The Queen of Spades, and the Countess in Strauss's Capriccio.

== Teaching ==
Kabaivanska has taught in Italy and Bulgaria. She has been associated with the Accademia Musicale Chigiana in Siena, the Vecchi-Tonelli Music Institute in Modena, the Accademia d'Arte Lirica in Osimo and New Bulgarian University in Sofia.

She gives an international masterclass annually at the International School of Raina Kabaivanska.

== International Master Class at New Bulgarian University ==
The International Master Class of Raina Kabaivanska at New Bulgarian University was established in Sofia in 2001. It is organised by New Bulgarian University and was initiated by Georgi Tekev, executive director and member of the university's Board of Trustees. The master class is organised in partnership with Sofia Municipality, the Sofia Opera and Ballet and the Sofia Philharmonic Orchestra.

The course is designed for young opera singers selected through auditions. Its programme combines work on vocal technique and stage interpretation with public performance opportunities, and the most successful participants receive scholarships from the Raina Kabaivanska Fund at New Bulgarian University for further training in Bulgaria and Italy.

The gala concerts of the class have been conducted by Nayden Todorov from the first edition in 2001 and in later documented editions with the orchestras of the Sofia Opera and Ballet and the Sofia Philharmonic Orchestra.

In 2025 the master class marked its 25th edition with a gala concert at the Sofia Opera and Ballet. The edition attracted a record 140 candidates from 30 countries; by that year the programme had hosted 270 singers, 111 of whom had received scholarships for further study in Italy.

Alumni and singers associated with Kabaivanska's international school include Vittoria Yeo, Arsen Soghomonyan, Alexandrina Mihaylova, Giuseppe Infantino and Baia Saganelidze. They have appeared on or been associated with stages such as La Scala, Covent Garden, the Metropolitan Opera, the Vienna State Opera, the Salzburg Festival, Teatro Real Madrid and the Sydney Opera House. Alexandra Mihaylova, another student of Kabaivanska, won a place at the La Scala Opera Academy in Milan after taking part in Kabaivanska's New Bulgarian University master class and receiving support for further training in Italy.

== Honours and awards ==
Kabaivanska has received a number of international awards, including the Bellini Prize, Viotti d'Oro, Puccini Prize, Illica Prize, Monteverdi Prize and the Grand Prix "A Life Devoted to Music". She was awarded the Order of Stara Planina in Bulgaria and became a Grand Officer of the Order of Merit of the Italian Republic in 2000.

In 2025, during the 25th edition of her New Bulgarian University master class, she received the "Person with a Significant Contribution to the Development of Philanthropy in Bulgaria" award and the Ministry of Culture's Golden Century necklace.

== Personal life ==
Kabaivanska married Italian stage producer Franco Guandalini with whom she has a daughter, Francesca. She resides in Modena, Italy.
