= Ljubljana Summer Festival =

Arts festival in Ljubljana, Slovenia

Coordinates: 46°2′47.75″N 14°30′11.24″E

Ljubljana Festival Ljubljanski festival
- Status: Active
- Genre: Music; Opera; Ballet; Theatre; Dance
- Frequency: Annual
- Locations: Ljubljana, Slovenia
- Country: Slovenia
- Years active: 1953–present
- Founder: City of Ljubljana
- General and artistic director: Darko Brlek
- Patron: Mayor of Ljubljana
- Website: www.ljubljanafestival.si/en/

The Ljubljana Festival is an annual international arts festival held in Ljubljana, the capital of Slovenia. Founded in 1953, it is the oldest festival in the country and one of the long-established summer festivals in Europe.

The festival presents classical music, opera, ballet, theatre, dance, jazz and popular music, with events taking place at several venues across the Slovenian capital. Its principal venues include the Križanke complex, Cankar Hall, Congress Square and other cultural venues in Ljubljana.

== History ==
The Ljubljana Festival was established by the City of Ljubljana in 1953 as a summer programme intended to animate the city through cultural and artistic events and to position Ljubljana as a festival centre in the wider European cultural space. It developed into a multidisciplinary event combining traditional and contemporary programming, including symphonic and chamber concerts, opera and ballet productions, theatre performances, musicals, jazz and popular music concerts.

In recent decades the festival has regularly hosted major international orchestras, opera companies, ballet ensembles, conductors and soloists. Its programme has included performances by leading European and international cultural institutions, while also presenting Slovenian artists and ensembles.

The 72nd Ljubljana Festival in 2024 presented more than 100 events and hosted artists from more than 50 countries, while the 73rd edition in 2025 continued the festival's summer programme of music, opera, dance, theatre and other events.

== Venues ==
The festival's best-known venue is Križanke, the former monastery complex redesigned by Jože Plečnik in the 1950s for festival use. Križanke includes an open-air theatre, the Križanke Church, the Knights' Hall and other spaces used for concerts and stage events.

Other venues used by the festival include Cankar Hall, Congress Square, the Slovenian Philharmonic Hall and additional cultural spaces in Ljubljana.

== Organisation and leadership ==
The Ljubljana Festival was founded by the City of Ljubljana, and the honorary patron of the festival is the Mayor of Ljubljana. The festival is organised by the public institute Festival Ljubljana, based at Trg francoske revolucije 1 in Ljubljana.

The general and artistic director is Darko Brlek. He became artistic director of the Ljubljana Festival in 1992 and later executive director in 1995. Brlek has also served as president of the European Festivals Association from 2005 to 2017 and is an honorary member of the association.

== Guest orchestras and ensembles ==
Orchestras and ensembles that have appeared at the Ljubljana Festival include the Vienna Philharmonic, Israel Philharmonic Orchestra, Mariinsky Theatre, Munich Philharmonic, Filarmonica della Scala, West–Eastern Divan Orchestra, Pittsburgh Symphony Orchestra, Bolshoi Theatre, Royal Philharmonic Orchestra, Boston Symphony Orchestra, Gewandhaus Orchestra, Royal Concertgebouw Orchestra, Sofia Philharmonic Orchestra, Béjart Ballet Lausanne and the Eifman Ballet of Saint Petersburg.

== Guest conductors ==
Conductors who have appeared at the festival include Valery Gergiev, Daniel Barenboim, Christoph Eschenbach, Daniel Harding, Zubin Mehta, Ennio Morricone, Riccardo Muti, Charles Dutoit, Fabio Luisi, Mstislav Rostropovich, En Shao, Nayden Todorov, Vasily Petrenko, Andris Nelsons, Herbert Blomstedt and Iván Fischer.

== Guest soloists ==
Instrumental soloists who have appeared at the festival include Yuri Bashmet, Denis Matsuev, Yehudi Menuhin, Julian Rachlin, Vadim Repin, Alexander Rudin, Mojca Zlobko Vajgl, Dubravka Tomšič Srebotnjak, Martha Argerich, Lang Lang, Hélène Grimaud, Jean-Yves Thibaudet and Simon Trpčeski.

Vocal soloists who have appeared at the festival include Anna Netrebko, Jonas Kaufmann, Paata Burchuladze, Joseph Calleja, José Carreras, Marjana Lipovšek, Ramón Vargas, Juan Diego Flórez, Diana Damrau, Nicolas Testé, Plácido Domingo, Sondra Radvanovsky, Piotr Beczała, Ute Lemper, Jonathan Tetelman and Ludovic Tézier.

== Programme ==
The festival programme covers symphonic and chamber music, opera, ballet, theatre, musical theatre, dance, jazz and popular music. It combines international guest appearances with Slovenian productions and artists, and also includes special projects in public spaces and historic venues in Ljubljana.

In addition to the summer festival, Festival Ljubljana also organises the Winter Festival, introduced into its regular programme after 2017, with concerts by Slovenian and international artists at different venues in Ljubljana.
