= Marian Bachev =

Bulgarian politician (born 1976)

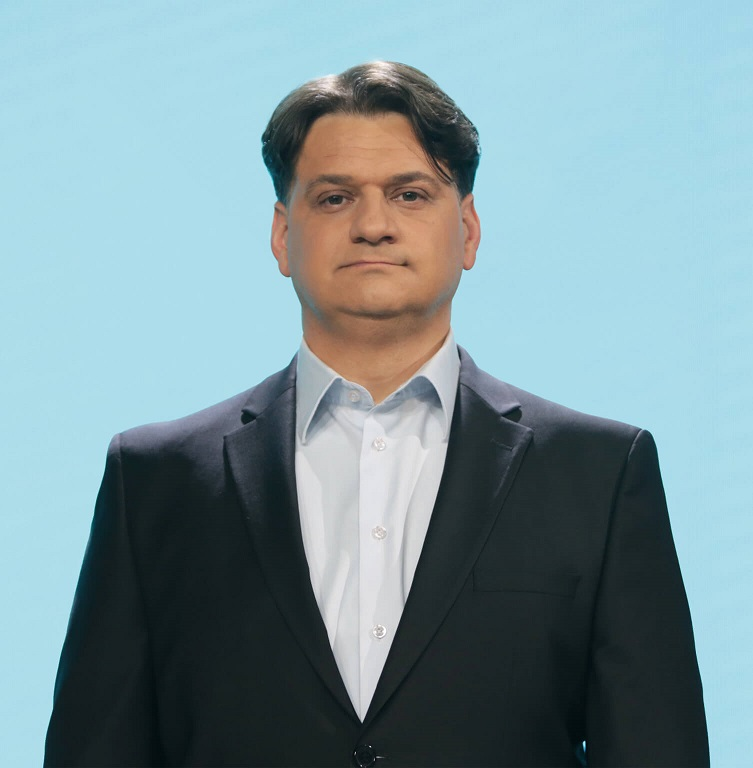

Minister of Culture
- In office 16 January 2025 – 19 February 2026
- Prime Minister: Rosen Zhelyazkov
- Preceded by: Nayden Todorov
- Succeeded by: Nayden Todorov

Personal details
- Born: 8 July 1976 (age 49)
- Party: There Are Such People

Marian Stoyanov Bachev (Bulgarian: Мариан Стоянов Бачев; born 8 July 1976) is a Bulgarian actor and politician who had served as minister of culture. Until 2025, he served as director of the Bulgarian drama program at the American College of Sofia.
