= Plovdiv Philharmonic Orchestra =

Bulgarian orchestra

The Plovdiv Philharmonic Orchestra was a Bulgarian orchestra whose origins date back to 1945. It is rooted in the hundred-year-old orchestral traditions of the largest cultural center of Thrace. The German neo-classical band Haggard performed with them as part of their Tales of Ithiria tour in 2010, marking their first live concert with an actual orchestra. At 2012, the orchestra was closed and not working anymore. Its successor is the orchestra of the State Opera Plovdiv, which continues the ensemble's traditions.

== Principal conductors ==
The orchestra's principal conductors over its history included Vladi Simeonov (founder), Ruslan Raychev, Mesru Mehmedov, Dobrin Petkov, Dimitar Manolov, Vladimir Ghiaurov, Borislav Ivanov, Nayden Todorov, Georgi Dimitrov and Alexei Izmirliev. The music director of State Opera Plovdov now is Dian Chobanov.

== Recordings ==
=== Balkanton ===
- R. Schumann – Piano Concerto in A minor, Op. 54. Ivan Drenikov, piano; Dobrin Petkov, conductor. BALKANTON LP BCA 10290; CD Balkanton 030197 / Castle Communications / St. Clair
- L. V. Beethoven – Piano Concerto No. 4 in G major, Op. 58. Ivan Drenikov, piano; Dobrin Petkov, conductor. Live, Sofia, 1979. BALKANTON CD 030197
- N. Paganini – Violin Concerto No. 5 in A minor, MS 78. Mincho Minchev, violin; Dobrin Petkov, conductor. BALKANTON LP BCA 10623.
- Mincho Minchev – Recital. Dobrin Petkov, conductor. 1984.
- S. Rachmaninoff – Symphonic Dances, Op. 45; The Rock, Op. 7. Ruslan Raychev, conductor.
- G. Rossini – Overtures. Ruslan Raychev, conductor. LaserLight Digital 15 520, 1988.

=== Danacord ===
Between 1999 and 2001, the orchestra recorded the complete six symphonies of the Danish composer Louis Glass for the Danacord label under conductor Nayden Todorov, released across four CDs (DACOCD 541–544) together with the Fantasia for Piano and Orchestra, Op. 47. This constitutes the first complete recording of Glass's symphonies in any format.

- Louis Glass – Symphony No. 4, Op. 43. Nayden Todorov, conductor. Recorded October 1999. Danacord DACOCD 541.
- Louis Glass – Symphonies Nos. 3 & 6. Nayden Todorov, conductor. Recorded June 2000. Danacord DACOCD 542.
- Louis Glass – Symphony No. 2; Fantasia for Piano and Orchestra, Op. 47. Romeo Smilkov, piano; Philippopolis Chamber Choir; Nayden Todorov, conductor. Recorded August 2000. Danacord DACOCD 543.
- Louis Glass – Symphonies Nos. 1 & 5 Sinfonia Svastika. Nayden Todorov, conductor. Recorded February–May 2001. Danacord DACOCD 544.

=== Music Minus One ===
During his tenure as Music Director (2000–2003), Nayden Todorov conducted the orchestra in an extensive series of play-along recordings for the American educational label Music Minus One, spanning concertos and arias for a wide range of instruments and voice. Examples include:

- Irena Petkova (mezzo-soprano) – Mozart Opera Arias for Mezzo-Soprano and Orchestra. Nayden Todorov, conductor. 1999. Music Minus One. ISBN 1-59615-552-3
- Christian Reichert (guitar) – Rodrigo: Concierto de Aranjuez. Nayden Todorov, conductor. Music Minus One.
- Raluca Stirbat (piano) – Chopin: Piano Concerto No. 2 in F minor, Op. 21. Nayden Todorov, conductor. Music Minus One.
- Iliana Todorova (piano) – Mozart: Piano Concertos Nos. 1 & 3, K. 37 & 40. Nayden Todorov, conductor. Music Minus One.
- Orit Orbach (clarinet & bass clarinet) – André Hajdu: Jewish Rhapsody for Clarinet and Orchestra. Nayden Todorov, conductor. Music Minus One.
- Kamen Tchanev (tenor) – Italian Tenor Arias with Orchestra. Nayden Todorov, conductor. Music Minus One.

=== Other ===
- Manuel Sirera (tenor) – Opera and zarzuela arias. Nayden Todorov, conductor. Recorded c. 2002.
