= Orlin Anastassov =

Bulgarian opera singer

- Орлин Анастасов
- Born: 1976 (age 49–50); Russe, Bulgaria
- Occupation: Opera singer (bass)
- Years active: 1996–present
- Notable work: Verdi's Requiem, Aida, Turandot, Attila
- Awards: First Prize, Operalia (1999)

Orlin Anastassov (Bulgarian: Орлин Анастасов) (born 1976) is a Bulgarian opera singer with an active international career performing leading bass roles. A winner of the 1999 Operalia competition, he has also performed many times as the bass soloist in the Verdi Requiem.

== Life and career ==
Anastassov was born in Russe, a city in northeastern Bulgaria. Both his parents were opera singers. He made had his operatic debut at the age of 20 as The King of Egypt in Aida at the Rousse State Opera. He won First Prize in the 1999 Operalia competition, and went on to make his debut at La Scala in Milan as Don Basilio in The Barber of Seville that same year. He has since returned there as Timur in Turandot (2004), as Ramfis in Aida (2007), and in the title role of Attila (2011). He has also performed at The Royal Opera House in London, New York's Metropolitan Opera House, the Vienna Staatsoper and other major houses around the world.

== Recordings ==
- Berlioz: Roméo et Juliette – 2000 (bass soloist). London Symphony Orchestra and Chorus, Colin Davis (conductor). Label: LSO Live CD 3.
- Berlioz: Les Troyens – 2001 (as L'ombre d'Hector). London Symphony Orchestra and Chorus, Colin Davis (conductor). Winner of the 2001 Grammy Awards for Best Classical Album and Best Opera Recording. Label: LSO Live CD 10.
- Russian opera arias for bass – 2002. Orlin Anastasov, bass; Orchestra of the Sofia National Opera, Nayden Todorov (conductor). Label: Music Minus One, MMOCDG4090.
- Verdi: I Vespri Siciliani – 2003 (as Procida). Arturo Toscanini Foundation Orchestra and Chorus, Stefano Ranzani (conductor). Label: Dynamic DVD 33551.
- Verdi: Nabucco – 2004 (as Zaccaria). Teatro Carlo Felice Orchestra and Chorus, Riccardo Frizza (conductor). Label: Dynamic DVD 33465.
- Verdi: Aida – 2006 (as Ramfis). Théâtre de la Monnaie Orchestra and Chorus, Kazushi Ono (conductor). Label: Opus Arte DVD 954.
- Mussorgsky: Boris Godunov – 2011 (as Boris Godunov). Teatro Regio di Torino Orchestra and Chorus, Gianandrea Noseda (conductor). Label: Opus Arte DVD 1053.
