= Günther Theuring =

Austrian conductor

Günther Theuring (28 November 1930 in Paris – 22 March 2016 in Vienna) was an Austrian conductor and choral conductor.

== Life ==
Theuring received his first musical training as a member of the Vienna Boys' Choir. He later studied conducting at what is now the University of Music and Performing Arts Vienna — then the Academy of Music and Performing Arts, Vienna — with Ferdinand Grossmann and Hans Swarowsky.

In 1955, Grossmann entrusted him with the direction of the Chamber Choir of the Vienna Music Academy, with which Theuring undertook four tours of the United States under the management of Columbia Artists New York. In 1959 he founded the Wiener Jeunesse-Chor, which under his direction developed into one of the most renowned choirs in Europe and became one of the preferred vocal ensembles of composers including Paul Hindemith and Leonard Bernstein. Bernstein recorded his complete vocal-instrumental works with the Jeunesse-Chor.

In 1975, under Theuring's direction, the Jeunesse-Chor became the first Western European choir to perform choral works of the Second Viennese School in Moscow and Leningrad. In 1971 he founded Ensemble Contraste Wien, a vocal and instrumental ensemble that gained recognition in Europe, particularly for its interpretations of the music of the Second Viennese School.

From 1960 onward, Theuring worked as a conductor not only in Austria but also in Belgium, Germany, Israel, Spain, the United States and Japan. He appeared with orchestras including the Vienna Symphony, the Gewandhausorchester Leipzig, the orchestra of La Scala, the Prague Symphony Orchestra, the Jerusalem Symphony Orchestra, the Slovak Philharmonic, the Mozarteum Orchestra Salzburg, the Budapest Symphony Orchestra, the Danish Radio Orchestra, the ORF Symphony Orchestra and the Tonkünstler-Orchester Niederösterreich. He also worked with major choirs including the MDR Leipzig Radio Choir, the Bavarian Radio Choir, the Frankfurt Radio Choir, the Budapest Radio Choir, the Danish Radio Choir, the RIAS Chamber Choir, the ORF Choir Vienna, the Wiener Singakademie and the Slovenski Komorni Zbor Ljubljana.

Theuring was especially associated with the vocal-symphonic music of the twentieth century. His guest appearances included the Wiener Festwochen, the Festival de Barcelona, the Israel Festival, the Festival de Monreale in Palermo and events connected with the 200th anniversary of La Scala in Milan.

In 1973, Theuring was appointed to the University of Music and Performing Arts Vienna, where he remained until his retirement in 1999 as professor of a conducting class for vocal-symphonic music. Conductors who studied with him included Nayden Todorov, Marko Hribernik, Avip Priatna, Alejandro Posada, and Federico Sepúlveda.

== Honours and awards ==
- Gold Medal of Merit of the Republic of Austria (1970)
- Austrian Cross of Honour for Science and Art, 1st class (1984)
