= Music Minus One =

- Industry: Music production and recording
- Founded: 1950; 76 years ago
- Founder: Irv Kratka
- Headquarters: Westchester, New York, United States
- Parent: Hal Leonard
- Website: www.musicminusone.com

Music Minus One (MMO) was an American educational music company founded in Westchester, New York. The company released play-along albums intended to accompany a melodic instrument or vocalist as an aid for practice and music education.

== Background ==
Music Minus One was founded in 1950 by Irv Kratka, then a 24-year-old college student. The company's first recording was based on Franz Schubert's Trout Quintet, with one instrumental part omitted in each version so performers could play along with the remaining ensemble.

In subsequent years the company expanded into chamber music, jazz, opera, vocal music and educational accompaniment recordings. Musicians appearing on MMO recordings included Stan Getz, Hank Jones, George Barnes, Max Roach, Julius Baker, Elaine Douvas, Armando Ghitalla, Stanley Drucker and Christian Reichert.

MMO produced approximately 900 albums covering genres including classical music, chamber music, opera, lieder, popular music, jazz and religious music.

During the expansion of its classical catalogue, Music Minus One developed long-term recording collaborations with a number of orchestras and conductors.

Numerous concerto and accompaniment releases were recorded with the Stuttgart Symphony Orchestra under conductor Emil Kahn.

Music Minus One also maintained an extensive collaboration with the Plovdiv Philharmonic Orchestra and Bulgarian conductor Nayden Todorov, particularly in classical and opera accompaniment recordings.

== Sale to Hal Leonard ==
In 2016 the CEO of Hal Leonard Corporation, Keith Mardak, purchased Music Minus One.
