= Stefan Dimitrov (bass) =

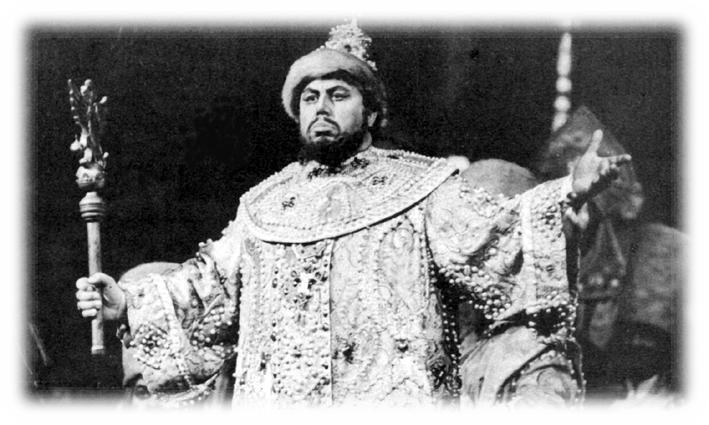
Stefan Dimitrov as Tsar Boris Godunov in Mussorgsky's opera Boris Godunov

Stefan Dimitrov (Bulgarian: Стефан Димитров; 22 November 1939 – 13 August 2004) was a basso opera singer. Born in the Black Sea town of Burgas, Bulgaria, he was of Greek origin. He won four international singing competitions at the very beginning of his career: those in Toulouse, the "Erkel" in Budapest, the "s’Hertogenbosch" in the Netherlands, and the "Young Opera Singers" in Sofia. In 1965 Stefan Dimitrov met the piano accompanist and répétiteur, Malina Dimitrova (Bulgarian: Малина Димитрова), who graduated at this time and took her first steps in the opera accompanying field. They were later to be married. The couple had one son, Liuben, who graduated as solo pianist and later become part of the Genova & Dimitrov piano duo.

== Early career ==
He graduated from the Central Master Studio of Singing of the Sofia State Music Academy under its founder and leader Prof. Christo Brumbarov, the teacher of singers such as Nicolai Ghiaurov, Nicola Ghiuselev, Ghena Dimitrova and others.

An invitation to pursue a post-graduate master's degree at the Bolshoi Theatre in Moscow followed. There Stefan sang under conductors such as B. Haikin, Y. Simonov (General Music Director of the Bolshoi at the time), M. Ermler, A. Lazarev, F. Mansurov and worked on stage presentation under Boris Pokrovski and his assistants. Together with partners such as Yevgeny Nesterenko, Elena Obraszova, Irina Archipova and Vladimir Atlantov, Dimitrov performed a number of roles: Boris in Boris Godunov, Don Basilio in Il Barbiere di Seviglia, the Grand Inquisitor in Don Carlos, Prince Galitzki and Khan Konchak in Prince Igor, Sparafucile in Rigoletto and others. Numerous engagements resulted in Stefan Dimitrov performing in many opera and concert theatres in Moscow and former UdSSR.

== National and international career ==
After they came back to Bulgaria, Stefan and Malina Dimitrova were invited as permanent soloist and chief répétiteur of the National State Opera Theatres of Sofia and of Rousse on the Danube, and they appeared with these ensembles in numerous tours to Spain, Germany, the Czech Republic, France and Italy. During his activities as soloist in Greece, Italy, France, Netherlands, Germany, Belgium, Luxembourg and in all Eastern Europe Stefan Dimitrov worked under conductors and stage directors such as W. Eichner, I. Ranzescu, A. Naydenov, I. Marinov, M. Angelov, Al. Raychev.

In 1980, Stefan and Malina launched their relationship with Belgium's leading opera house, La Monnaie, in Brussels under its director Gerard Mortier. Later on, this collaboration grew to include the Vlaamse Opera company in Antwerp.

Under conductors such as Sir John Pritchard, Silvio Varviso, Machael Schonwandt, Silvain Cambreling and stage directors such as Adolf Dresen, Kurt Horez, Pierre Constant, the singer had many engagements, including guest appearances under the auspices of La Monnaie and the Vlaamse Opera throughout Europe. During this period Stefan Dimitrov's partners on stage were singers such as José van Dam, Ermanno Mauro, Karita Mattila, and Leona Mitchell.

Dimitrov died, aged 64, in Sofia.

== Awards ==
During his musical career Stefan Dimitrov was awarded many prizes for his artistic achievements in Bulgaria, Germany, Belgium (Special Merits of the Queen) and in France and was presented in the 1999 "Who Is Who in Bulgaria" and the 2000 "Who is Who in Bulgarian Culture".

== Recordings ==
Stefan Dimitrov made a number of studio and live recording sessions at numerous radio and TV broadcasting corporations in Bulgaria, Belgium, Netherlands, France, etc. as well as a few CD releases for EMI.

== Selected repertoire ==
- Beethoven, L. Van – 9th Symphony
- Bellini, V. – I Capuleti e i Montecchi - Capelio
- Borodin, Al. – Prince Igor - Prince Galitzki & Khan Konchak
- Donizetti, G. - Viva La Mama - Mama Agata
- Donizetti, G. - L'elisir d'amore - Dulcamara
- Donizetti, G. - Lucia di Lammermoor - Raimondo
- Glinka, M. - Ivan Susanin - Ivan Sussanin
- Gounod, Ch. - Faust - Mephisto
- Mozart, W.A. - Die Zauberflöte - Zarastro
- Mozart, W.A. - Requiem
- Mussorgsky, M. - Boris Godunov - Boris Godunov, Varlaam, Pimen
- Nikolai, O. – Die lustigen Weiber von Windsor - Falstaff
- Puccini, G. – Turandot - Timur
- Prokofiev, S. – Semyon Kotko - Tkachenko
- Rossini, G. - Il barbiere di Siviglia - Don Basilio
- Rossini, G. - L'italiana in Algeri - Mustafa
- Rossini, G. - La gazza ladra - Gotardo
- Rossini, G. - Stabat Mater -
- Saint-Saëns, C. – Samson et Dalila - Abimelech
- Smetana, B. – The Bartered Bride - Kezal
- Tchaikovsky, P. – Eugene Onegin - Prince Gremin
- Verdi, G. - Don Carlos - King Philip & The Great Inquisitor
- Verdi, G. - Nabucco - Zaccaria
- Verdi, G. - Simon Boccanegra - Fiesco
- Verdi, G. - Aida - Ramphis and the King
- Verdi, G. - Il trovatore - Ferrando
- Verdi, G. - Un ballo in maschera - Tom
- Verdi, G. - Rigoletto - Sparafucile and Monterone
- Verdi, G. - Macbeth - Banquo
- Verdi, G. - Stiffelio - Borg
- Verdi, G. - Messa da Requiem -
- Wagner, R. - Der fliegende Holländer - Daland
- Wagner, R. - Tannhäuser - Biterolf
- Wagner, R. - Die Meistersinger von Nürnberg

== See also ==
- La Monnaie
- De Vlaamse Opera
- Rousse State Opera
