= Uroš Lajovic =

Slovenian conductor

Uroš Lajovic is a Slovenian conductor and professor. He has served as guest conductor, permanent conductor, artistic director and artistic advisor at numerous prominent European orchestras. He is professor emeritus at the University of Music and Performing Arts Vienna.

== Career ==
Uroš Lajovic, born on July 4, 1944, in Slovenia studied composition and conducting in his home town Ljubljana. In the years 1975 to 1979 he was the chief conductor of the RTV Chamber Orchestra. After having studied with Prof. Bruno Maderna at Mozarteum in Salzburg he continued at Hochschule für Musik und darstellende Kunst in Vienna, Austria with Prof. Hans Swarowsky in whose class Lajovic received a master's degree with honors.

At first he was the principal conductor of the Slovenian Philharmonic, a position he held until 1991, and of the Zagreb Symphony Orchestra in Croatia. He also conducted the RTV Slovenia Symphony Orchestra. In 1988, Lajovic established the Chamber Orchestra Slovenicum which was active until 2001. Very soon after, he achieved international acclaim by conducting in major orchestras all over the world. Since then, Uroš Lajovic has been guest conductor, permanent conductor, artistic director and artistic advisor of numerous prominent European musical institutions. Between 2001–06 he was the chief conductor of the Belgrade Philharmonic.

In 1991 Lajovic was named Professor in Ordinary at the University of Music and Performing Arts in Austria, where he taught a generation of conductors including Kirill Petrenko, Nayden Todorov, Andrés Orozco-Estrada, Alan Buribayev, Avi Priatna and Alejandro Posada.. In 2012 he became Professor Emeritus. Since 2009 until 2014 he also held a teaching position at the Zagreb Music Academy, Croatia.

== Chamber Orchestra Slovenicum ==
Chamber orchestra Slovenicum was founded in 1989 by Uroš Lajovic, who was also the conductor and artistic director of the ensemble until its end in 2001. Their main work had been dedicated to the performance practice of 18th-century music; but even more, the orchestra also regularly performed commissioned work by Slovenian composers. Slovenicum had always tried to carefully select its musicians, therefore they represented the best from Ljubljana's major orchestras such as Slovenian Philharmonic, RTV Slovenia Symphony Orchestra and the Orchestra of Slovene National Theatre Opera and Ballet. In their first season their repertoire consisted of Mozart and Haydn cycles what led to a large number of concerts in Slovenia and abroad. Their success attracted many famous musical names and many fruitful cooperations had been born.

== Bibliography ==
- Uroš Lajovic: Beethoven – Die Bedeutung der semantischen Zeichen in seinen Symphonien, Vienna: Hollitzer, 2022. ISBN 978-3-99094-031-0

== Awards ==
- 1967 – Prešeren Prize for Composition, Ljubljana
- 1969 – Prešeren Prize for Conducting, Ljubljana
- 1971 – »Abgangspreis«, University of Music Vienna
- 1976 – 2nd Prize »Guido Cantelli« La Scala, Milano
- 1981 – Prešeren Prize for conducting Mahler' Symphony No.1, Ljubljana
- 2006 – Medal »White Angel« from Republic of Serbia
- 2008 – Ljubljana Award for culture
- 2013 – Austrian Honour Knight Cross for Culture and Science
