= University of Music and Performing Arts Vienna =

University in Vienna, Austria

- Universität für Musik und darstellende Kunst Wien
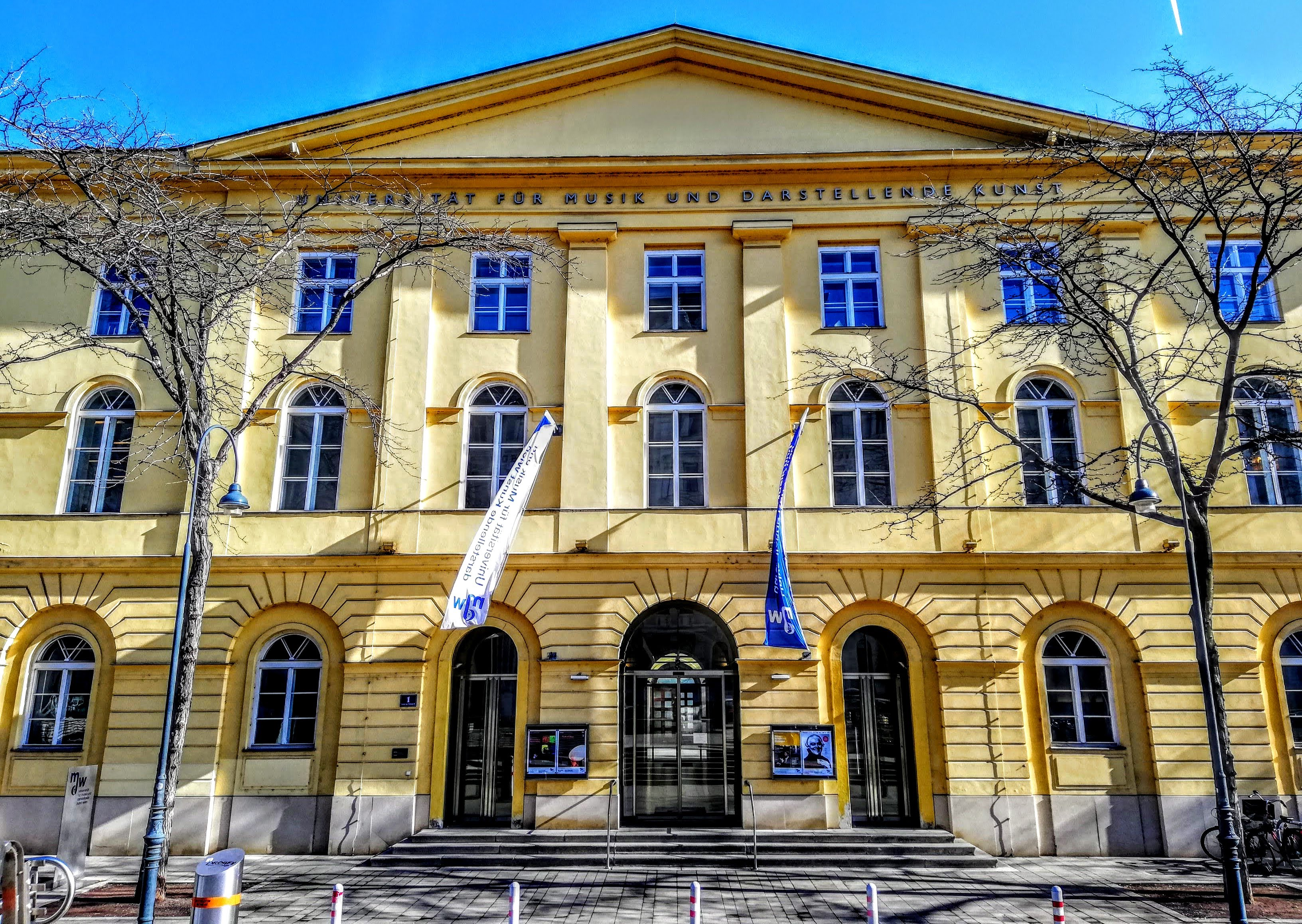
- University of Music and Performing Arts Vienna main building
- Former name: Hochschule für Musik und darstellende Kunst Wien
- Motto in English: Tradition and Innovation
- Type: Public
- Established: 1817; 209 years ago
- Rektor: Ulrike Sych
- Academic staff: 850
- Administrative staff: 200
- Students: >3,000
- Location: Vienna, Austria; 48°12′06″N 16°23′06″E
- Website: mdw.ac.at

The University of Music and Performing Arts Vienna (German: Universität für Musik und darstellende Kunst Wien, abbreviated MDW) is an Austrian university established in 1817 in Vienna. With a student body of over 3,000, it is the largest institution of its kind in Austria, and one of the largest in the world.

In 1817, it was established by the Society for the Friends of Music. It has had several names: Vienna Conservatory, Vienna Academy and in 1909 it was nationalized as the Imperial Academy of Music and the Performing Arts. In 1998, the University assumed its current name to reflect its university status, attained in a wide-ranging 1970 reform for Austrian Arts Academies.

== The university ==
With a student body of more than 3000, the Universität für Musik und Darstellende Kunst Wien (MDW) is one of the largest arts universities in the world. The University consists of 25 departments including the Max Reinhardt Seminar, Vienna Film Academy and the Wiener Klangstil.

MDW facilities include the Schönbrunn Palace Theater, Antonio Vivaldi Room, Salesian Convent, St. Ursula Church, Lothringerstrasse (Franz Liszt Room) and the Anton Von Webern Platz (university main campus). Modern film studios were completed on the university campus in 2004, offering the Vienna Film Academy modern equipment.

The University organizes around ten competitions including the International Beethoven Piano Competition. It also presents an acclaimed students' film festival every two years. The MDW may be considered a "feeder" institution to all major orchestras in Austria, with a particular association with the Vienna Philharmonic.

== History ==
Calls for a music conservatory in Vienna started in 1808. In 1811, an "outline for a music education institution" for Vienna was published. In 1812, the Society for the Friends of Music was formed, with the foremost aim of establishing a conservatory. The Vienna Conservatory was founded in 1817. It was meant to be modeled on the Paris Conservatory, but, due to a lack of funds, it began solely as a singing school. Antonio Salieri was the Conservatory's first director. In 1819, it hired violinist Joseph Böhm, and by 1827 offered courses in most orchestral instruments.

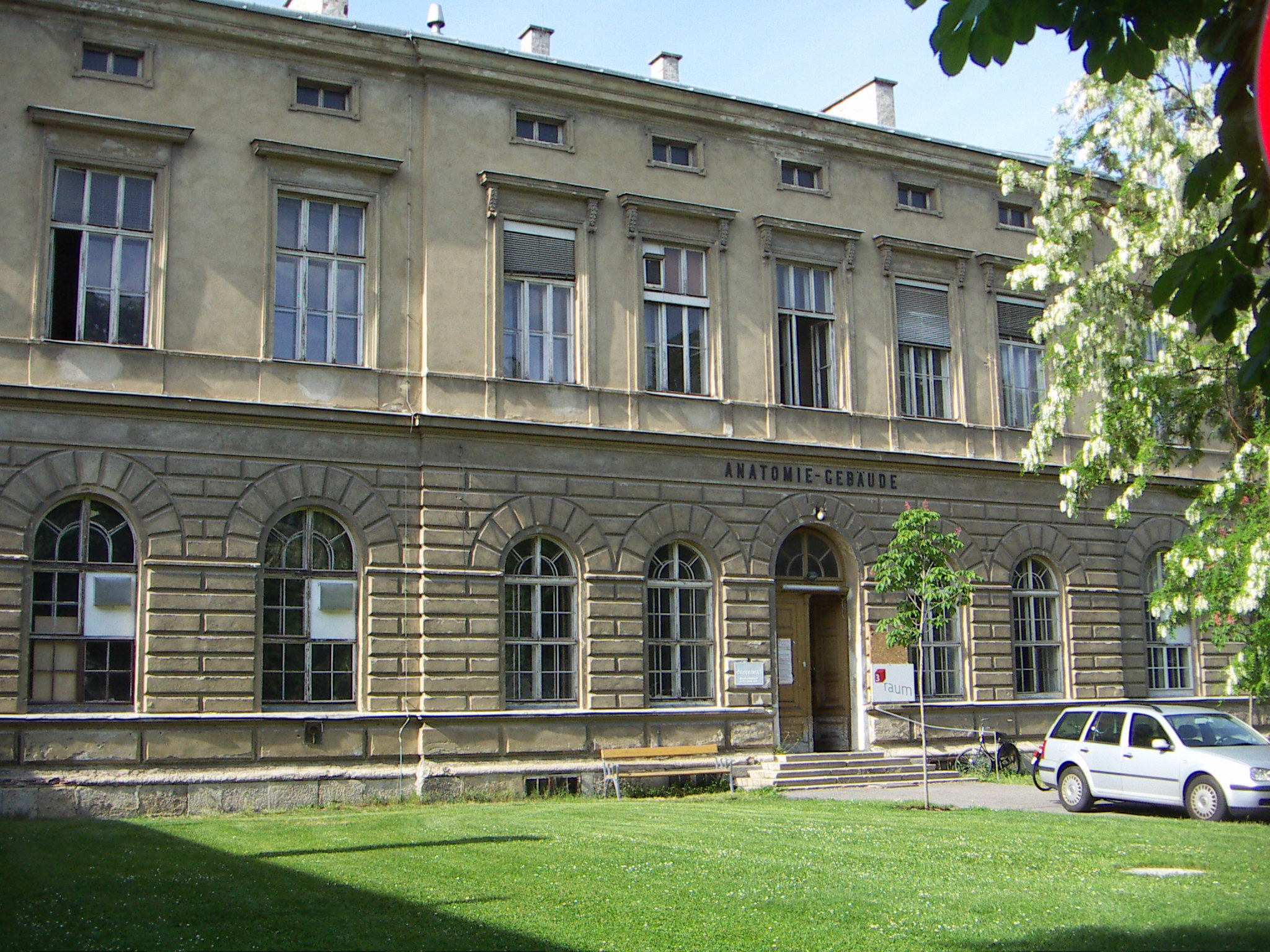
University of Music and Performing Arts Vienna

The Conservatory's finances were very unstable. Tuition fees were introduced in 1829, but by 1837 the institution was bankrupt. The state eventually funded the Conservatory from 1841 to 1844 and from 1846 to 1848. In 1848 political unrest caused the state to discontinue funding, and the Conservatory did not offer courses again until 1851. With support from the state and the city, finances again stabilized after 1851. Despite growing state subsidies, The Society for the Friends of Music, which founded the Conservatory, remained in control of the institution. However, by a January 1, 1909, imperial resolution the school was nationalized and became the Imperial Academy of Music and the Performing Arts (k.k. Akademie für Musik und darstellende Kunst). (Until then its name was the Konservatorium der Gesellschaft der Musikfreunde.)

Until 1844, when Gottfried Preyer, professor of harmony and composition became director, the director of the Conservatory was not a member of faculty, but a member of the Society for the Friends of Music. Joseph Hellmesberger Sr. was director from 1851 to 1893. From 1907 Wilhelm Bopp had been the director of Conservatory. The Conservatory was still dominated by the aging Robert Fuchs and Hermann Grädener, both of whom, but especially Fuchs, Bopp considered to be anachronistic and out of touch. In 1912, attempting to rejuvenate the Conservatory Bopp offered teaching positions to Franz Schreker and Arnold Schoenberg. Schoenberg declined the offer, but Schreker accepted it. His teaching duties were carried through with great success and by January 1913 he was awarded a full professorship.

Bopp was also instrumental in the 1909 nationalization of the Conservatory. The administration of the Academy was now assigned to a state-appointed president, an artistic director and a board of trustees. After the end of World War I, the State Academy was again reorganized. President Karl Ritter von Wiener resigned and conductor Ferdinand Löwe was elected director by the teachers. In 1922, Joseph Marx took over. He wanted the Academy to be granted university status.

After the Anschluss, many teachers and students were dismissed on racial grounds. In 1941, the Academy became a Reich University (Reichshochschule). After World War II, the institution became a State Academy again. In the process of Denazification, fifty-nine teachers were dismissed; by November 1945, sixteen were reinstated. Only five of the teachers dismissed in 1938 were reinstated. By laws introduced in 1948 and 1949 the institution was granted the status of "Art Academy". In 1970, the "Law on the Organization of Art Colleges" effectively gave all Art Academies University status, and in 1998 the title of "Art Academy" was changed to "Art University".

Institut für Komposition, Elektroakustik und TonmeisterInnen-Ausbildung aka ELAK is part of MDW and focuses on electroacoustic music, improvisation, composing of contemporary music, and sound art.

== Departments ==
- Department of Composition Studies and Music Production
- Department of Conducting
- Department of Music Analysis, Theory and History
- Department of Keyboard Instruments (Instrumental Programme)
- Department of String Instruments (Instrumental Programme)
- Leonard Bernstein Department of Wind and Percussion Instruments (Instrumental Programme)
- Joseph Haydn Department for Chamber Music and New Music
- Department of Organ, Organ Research and Church Music
- Department of Voice and Music Theatre
- Max Reinhardt Seminar Department of Drama
- Film Academy Vienna Department of Film and Television
- Department of Music Education
- Department of Music and Movement Education
- Department of Music Therapy
- Department of Stylistic Research in Music
- Department of Popular Music
- Ludwig van Beethoven Department of Keyboards in Music Education
- Hellmesberger Department of Strings in Music Education
- Franz Schubert Department of Wind and Percussion Instruments in Music Education
- Antonio Salieri Department of Voice in Music Education
- Anton Bruckner Department of Music Theory, Ear Training and Ensemble Direction
- Department of Music Research and Ethnomusicology
- Department of Music Acoustics – Wiener Klangstil
- Department of Music Sociology
- Department of Cultural Management and Cultural Studies

== Notable past teachers ==
- Walter Berry
- Joseph Böhm
- Anton Bruckner
- Ferruccio Busoni
- Josef Dachs
- Julius Epstein
- Robert Fischhof
- Karlheinz Essl Jr.
- Robert Fuchs
- Leopold Godowsky
- Jakob Grün
- Leopold Hager
- Rotraud Hansmann
- Hans Haselböck
- Joseph Hellmesberger Sr.
- Władysław Kędra, from 1 October 1957
- Josef Krips
- Hartmut Krones
- Uroš Lajovic
- Ferdinand Löwe
- Mathilde Marchesi
- Joseph Marx
- Eduard Melkus
- Joseph Merk
- Martin Gustav Nottebohm
- Karl Österreicher
- Anna Pessiak-Schmerling
- Erwin Ratz
- Max Reinhardt
- Carole Dawn Reinhart
- Hilde Rössel-Majdan
- Antonio Salieri
- Emil von Sauer
- Simon Sechter
- Franz Schalk
- Arnold Schoenberg (Note: Arnold Schoenberg was not a faculty member, but he taught a private theory course in 1911.)
- Franz Schmidt
- Franz Schreker
- Ertuğrul Sevsay
- Leopold Spitzer
- Richard Stöhr
- Otmar Suitner
- Hans Swarowsky
- Günther Theuring
- Mimi Wagensonner
- Luise Walker
- Felix Weingartner
- Erik Werba
