= Nayden Todorov =

Bulgarian conductor (born 1974)

- Найден Тодоров
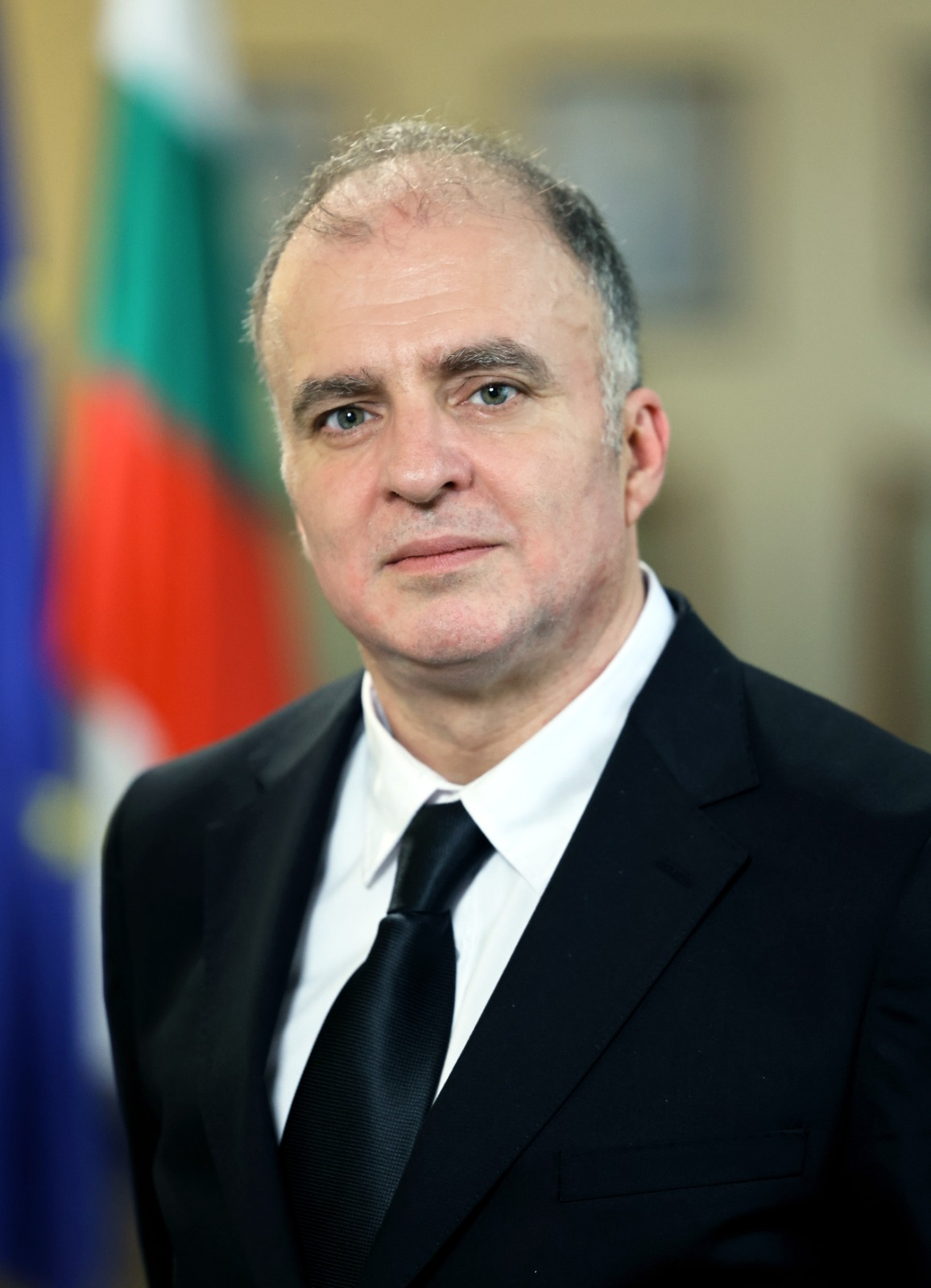
- Nayden Todorov in 2026

Minister of Culture
- In office 19 February 2026 – 8 May 2026
- Premier: Andrey Gyurov
- Preceded by: Marian Bachev
- Succeeded by: Evtim Miloshev
- In office 9 April 2024 – 16 January 2025
- Premier: Dimitar Glavchev
- Preceded by: Krastyu Krastev
- Succeeded by: Marian Bachev
- In office 3 February 2023 – 6 June 2023
- Premier: Galab Donev
- Preceded by: Velislav Minekov
- Succeeded by: Krastyu Krastev

Personal details
- Born: 8 April 1974 (age 52) Plovdiv, People's Republic of Bulgaria

Nayden Todorov (Bulgarian: Найден Тодоров; born 8 April 1974) is a Bulgarian conductor, cultural manager, and author. He has served as Artistic Director of the Sofia Philharmonic Orchestra since 2017, under whose direction the orchestra has performed at major venues including the Musikverein in Vienna, the Berliner Philharmonie, and the Palais des Beaux-Arts in Brussels. He has also served as Bulgaria's caretaker Minister of Culture on three occasions, in 2023, 2024–2025, and 2026.

His international recognition includes the Order of Arts and Letters awarded by the Republic of France (2025) and the Order of Cultural Merit in the rank of Grand Officer, awarded by the President of Romania (2024). He is among a small number of Bulgarian musicians to have received the award "Musician of the Year" more than once, having been voted to this distinction by listeners of the Bulgarian National Radio in 2012 and 2018.

== Early life and education ==
Todorov was born on 8 April 1974 in Plovdiv. He began piano lessons at the age of five. He studied piano under Darina Kantardzhieva and trumpet under Lilia Kovacheva-Toporcheva at the Dobrin Petkov National School of Music in Plovdiv, from which he graduated with honours in 1993. While still a pupil, he also studied composition with Svetlozar Bratanov and conducting with Krastju Marev, the long-serving principal conductor of the Plovdiv Opera. As a student he founded the Plovdiv Youth Orchestra, with which he toured and performed in Bulgaria, Austria, the Czech Republic, Slovakia, and Germany.

He subsequently studied at the University of Music and Performing Arts Vienna, where he worked in the orchestral conducting class of Professor Uroš Lajovic, studied choral conducting with Professor Günther Theuring, opera conducting with Professor Konrad Leitner and musical leadership with Peter Richter. Additional formative influences included composer Alexander Vladigerov and conductor Karl Österreicher. During his Viennese studies he held scholarships from the Borghese Foundation (1993–1995), the Saints Cyril and Methodius Foundation (1995–1997), Rotary International Vienna (1995–1997), and the George Wachter Foundation of Switzerland (1996–1998).

In 1996, Todorov was invited by the Leonard Bernstein Foundation (Jerusalem) for a specialisation at the Rubin Academy of Music and Dance, where he studied under Mendi Rodan, conductor of the Israel Philharmonic Orchestra. While in Israel he also served as a trumpet player in the Jerusalem Symphony Orchestra, working alongside conductors including Lorin Maazel, Sergiu Comissiona, and Krzysztof Penderecki.

He received a master's degree in conducting from New Bulgarian University in 2001, later obtained a degree in Cultural Management from the same university in 2013, and holds a doctorate from New Bulgarian University.

== Career ==
=== Early career (1993–2000) ===
Todorov made his professional conducting debut in 1993 with the Vratsa Philharmonic Orchestra, at the invitation of its principal conductor Vesselin Baytchev, and became the orchestra's conductor in 1995. In 1997, he founded the Thracian Summer international festival in Plovdiv, which he has directed since its inception.

In 1998, he was selected from among more than 150 candidates to become the permanent conductor of the North Israel Symphony Orchestra in Haifa, his first permanent international appointment. That same year he was invited to serve as Artistic Advisor of the Los Angeles International Chamber Music Festival.

=== Plovdiv and Burgas (2000–2005) ===
In 2000, at the age of 26, Todorov was appointed Music Director of the Plovdiv Opera and Philharmonic Orchestra, becoming at that time the youngest conductor in Bulgaria to hold such a position. He made his operatic debut in early 2001 with a production of Puccini's Tosca. Under his direction the Plovdiv Opera undertook international touring, including productions presented in the Netherlands, Germany, and the United Kingdom. With the Plovdiv Philharmonic he recorded the symphonies of Louis Glass for the Danish label Danacord. In 2001, he also began a long-standing collaboration with soprano Raina Kabaivanska, conducting the orchestra at her master classes at the Sofia National Opera; the collaboration extended over subsequent years to concerts in Italy and Spain.

Between 2003 and 2005, Todorov served as Artistic Director of the Burgas Opera and Philharmonic Society.

=== Ruse State Opera (2005–2017) ===
From 2005 to 2017, Todorov was the director of the State Opera in Ruse, where he also held the position of artistic director of the "Danube Sounds" Choir. Under his direction the Ruse Opera performed in Austria, Switzerland, Germany, Italy, Spain, Portugal, France, Belgium, the Netherlands, and Luxembourg, and undertook tours to Italy, South Korea, and Dubai. His production of Shostakovich's Katerina Izmailova, directed by Vera Nemirova, was covered in a special broadcast on Austrian television and in the German opera magazine Opernwelt. During this period he received multiple Crystal Lyre awards and the Emil Chakarov Prize (2014), and was made an Honorary Citizen of Ruse in 2015.

During his tenure in Ruse, Todorov created and has been closely associated with the international summer festival Scene by the River (Bulgarian: Сцена край реката), conducting productions including Verdi's Rigoletto, gala concerts with tenor Kaludi Kaludov, and the world premiere of John Robertson's opera Orpheus.

=== Sofia Philharmonic Orchestra (2017–present) ===
Todorov made his debut with the Sofia Philharmonic Orchestra in 2001. From the 2004–2005 season he became its permanent guest conductor, later advancing to principal guest conductor. In 2017, he was elected Artistic Director of the orchestra, a position to which he was re-elected in October 2022.

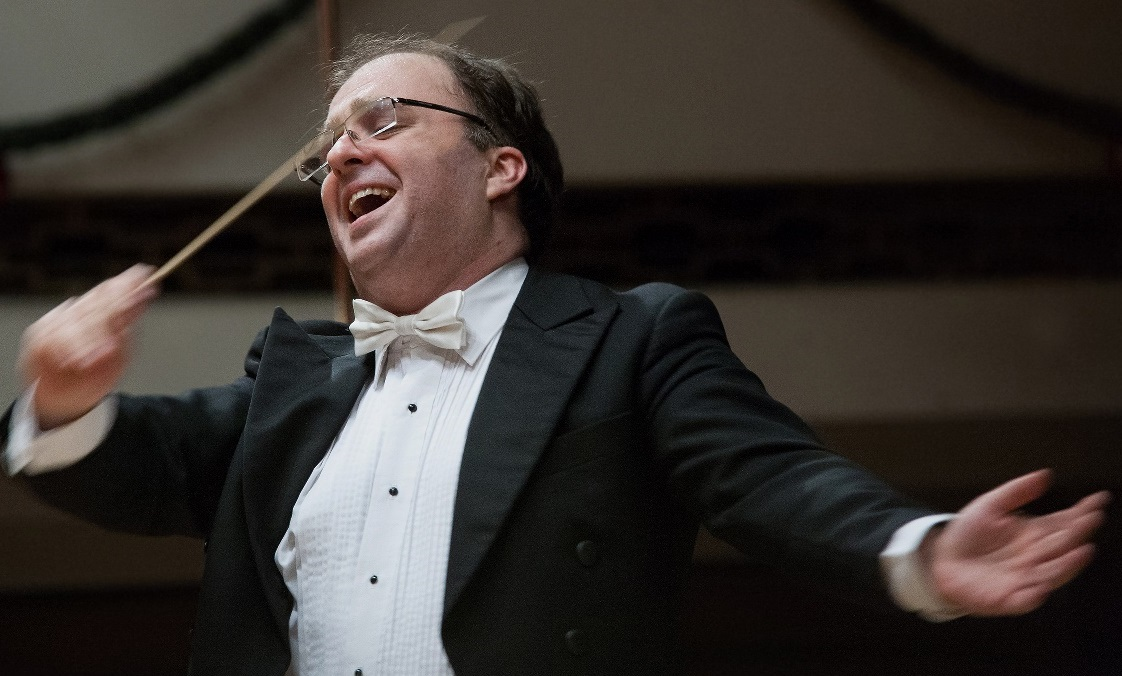
Todorov in 2013

Under his artistic leadership, the Sofia Philharmonic has appeared at major international venues, including the UNESCO Headquarters in Paris, the Palais des Beaux-Arts in Brussels (January 2018, at the inaugural concert of the Bulgarian Presidency of the Council of the European Union), the Musikverein in Vienna (2019 and May 2022), the Berliner Philharmonie (December 2022), the Konzerthaus Wien, the Liederhalle in Stuttgart, the Lisinski Hall in Zagreb, and the Romanian Athenaeum in Bucharest.

The orchestra has also appeared under his direction at numerous international festivals and summer concert series, including the Ljubljana Festival in Slovenia, the Varna Summer International Music Festival, and the European Music Festival in Sofia, where in 2018 he conducted the opening gala concert with violinist Maxim Vengerov and the Sofia Philharmonic Orchestra.

Writing in December 2019, Gramophone described the Sofia Philharmonic under Todorov's direction as having "engendered a broader, bolder repertoire in its concerts" and noted that he had "brought a new calibre of soloist and guest conductor to work with it." Among the soloists who have appeared with the orchestra under his direction are Joshua Bell, Julian Rachlin, Midori, Sarah Chang, Maxim Vengerov, Martha Argerich, Maria João Pires, Ivo Pogorelich, Gautier Capuçon, Roberto Alagna, Thomas Hampson, and Plácido Domingo.

In an interview with Bachtrack in September 2023, Todorov described his approach to programming as systematic, combining audience polls, orchestral feedback, and analysis of international concert programmes to select soloists and repertoire.

=== International guest conducting ===
Todorov has guest-conducted orchestras across Europe, Asia, North and South America, and Africa. Among the orchestras he has conducted are the Wiener Symphoniker, Berliner Symphoniker, London Symphony Orchestra, Czech National Symphony Orchestra, Poznan Philharmonic Orchestra, National Polish Radio Symphony Orchestra, George Enescu Philharmonic Orchestra, Borusan Istanbul Philharmonic Orchestra, the National Symphony Orchestra of Brazil, Orquesta Filarmónica de Bogotá, Cairo Philharmonic Orchestra, Sicilia Symphony Orchestra, and the LA Festival Chamber Orchestra.

Opera houses at which he has conducted include the Volksoper Wien (including The Nutcracker), Liceu Opera Barcelona, İstanbul State Opera and Ballet, Belgrade National Opera, Bucharest National Opera, and the Wichita Grand Opera.

In Spain, Todorov made his debut at the Gran Teatre del Liceu conducting the orchestra of the theatre in a recital by soprano Sonya Yoncheva. Reviewing the concert, Platea Magazine wrote that he conducted "with clarity, efficiency and concentration". In Colombia, he conducted the Orquesta Filarmónica de Bogotá in concerts with cellist Santiago Cañón-Valencia, including works by Debussy, Saint-Saëns and Franck.

Concert halls at which he has performed include the Musikverein Vienna, Grosses Festspielhaus Salzburg, Konzerthaus Wien, Berliner Philharmonie, Alte Oper Frankfurt, Laeiszhalle Hamburg, Herkulessaal Munich, Meistersingerhalle Nuremberg, Concertgebouw Amsterdam, Tonhalle Zürich, Bolshoi Theatre Moscow, Tchaikovsky Concert Hall Moscow, Coliseu do Porto, Auditorio Nacional Madrid, and L'Auditori Barcelona.

He has also appeared at international festivals and open-air summer concert series in Germany and Austria, including the Münchner Open Air Sommer at the Residenz München, the Sommernacht der Filmmusik series in Munich and Nuremberg, productions at the Serenadenhof Nürnberg, the Amphitheater Hanau summer festival series, the Seebühne Bremen open-air concerts, and festival events in the Wörthersee region of Klagenfurt.

In 2025, he conducted the opening gala concert of the International Istanbul Opera Festival at the Atatürk Cultural Center in Istanbul.

=== Film music and crossover projects ===
Following an acquaintance with Hollywood composer Jerry Goldsmith in Los Angeles in 1996, Todorov became a regular conductor of film music concerts, including an annual series in Munich. In 2019, he conducted a major Chinese tour of Star Wars in Concert, organised by Disney, featuring the Sofia Philharmonic Orchestra. He has also conducted the concert series "The Night of the Five Tenors" at venues including the Berliner Philharmonie, the Herkulessaal in Munich, the Laeiszhalle in Hamburg, the Liederhalle in Stuttgart, the Alte Oper in Frankfurt, and the Meistersingerhalle in Nuremberg.

Todorov has also collaborated with artists outside the traditional classical repertoire, including the American singer Anastacia, conducting her concert appearances in Germany. He has also collaborated with Bulgarian pop singer Lili Ivanova in symphonic crossover concerts with the Sofia Philharmonic Orchestra.

His crossover discography includes Jon Lord's Live in Bucharest, recorded in 2009 with the Rousse Philharmonic Orchestra.

=== Television ===
Since 2018, Todorov has served as the host of A Concert with BNT 2, an educational classical music programme on Bulgarian National Television's BNT 2 channel.

== Recordings ==
Todorov has made more than 130 recordings for labels including Music Minus One (MMO), Danacord, Hungaroton, Naxos, Dynamic, Doron Music, Waterpipe Records, Gega New, Balkanton and IMI.

Among his most extensive recording projects is a series of more than 80 play-along editions for Music Minus One, published by Hal Leonard, recorded primarily with the Plovdiv Philharmonic Orchestra, the Sofia National Opera Orchestra, the Plovdiv Chamber Orchestra, and the Festival Orchestra of Bulgaria. The series spans a wide range of repertoire, including piano concertos by Mozart, Beethoven, Chopin, Grieg, Saint-Saëns, Rachmaninoff, Anton Rubinstein, Alexander Glazunov and Anton Arensky; violin concertos by Paganini, Bruch, Wieniawski, Korngold and Prokofiev; guitar concertos by Rodrigo, Castelnuovo-Tedesco, Giuliani, Carulli and Ponce; cello concertos by Elgar and Haydn; and operatic vocal repertoire by Verdi, Puccini, Bellini, Donizetti and Rossini, among others. Featured soloists include pianists Milena Mollova, Martin Stambolov, Raluca Stirbat, Alexander Raytchev, Iliana Todorova, Paul Van Ness and Bruce Levy; violinists Bojidara Kouzmanova, Daniela Shtereva and Mila Georgieva; guitarist Christian Reichert; and singers Zvetelina Maldjanska, Zvetelina Vassileva, Ivanka Ninova, Orlin Anastasov and Svetozar Rangelov, among others.

Among his internationally distributed recordings are Ludwig Minkus' Don Quixote and Sergei Rachmaninoff's Opera Highlights for Naxos with the Sofia National Opera Orchestra, the complete symphonies of the Danish composer Louis Glass with the Plovdiv Philharmonic Orchestra for Danacord, the complete piano concertos of Bulgarian composer Pancho Vladigerov with pianist Ludmil Angelov and the Bulgarian National Radio Symphony Orchestra, André Hajdu's Dreams of Spain / Concerto for an Ending Century for Hungaroton with the Sofia Festival Orchestra, and Pablo de Sarasate's works for violin and orchestra with violinist Mario Hossen and the Plovdiv Philharmonic Orchestra for Dynamic.

He has also recorded concertos and orchestral works with artists including Mario Hossen, Bojidara Kouzmanova, guitarist Christian Reichert, and harpist Sivan Magen in Ami Maayani's Concerto for Harp and Orchestra.

In 2009 he conducted the Rousse Philharmonic Orchestra in Jon Lord's live concert recording Live in Bucharest, later released internationally on DVD, CD and vinyl.

In 2025, he conducted the London Symphony Orchestra in a recording of Sergei Rachmaninoff's Piano Concerto No. 3 with Bulgarian pianist Ivan Yanakov; the album was released worldwide on 27 February 2026.

== Teaching activity ==
Todorov has been active as a music educator alongside his conducting career. He has lectured in cultural management at New Bulgarian University from around 2013. At NBU's Department of Music he teaches a range of courses in the bachelor's programme in Music, including Foundations of the Music Industry, Management of the Musical Arts, Marketing Strategies and Practices in the Musical Arts, Advertising in the Musical Arts, Working with Audiences, Music Producer, and Conducting a Choir. In the master's programme in Classical Music he teaches Working with a Conductor.

In October 2021 he delivered the inaugural public lecture of the Projections of Dialogue project at the Academy of Music, Dance and Fine Arts (АMTII) in Plovdiv, part of the Plovdiv 2019 European Capital of Culture programme. The lecture, titled Building the Professional Path of the Classical Musician, was held in the Academy's concert hall and was recorded and made publicly available online.

His teaching activity includes masterclasses in Portugal and Spain. In July 2016 he led a conducting course at the Real Conservatorio Profesional de Música in Almería, Spain, covering Dvořák's New World Symphony and Schubert's Symphony No. 3, and delivered a lecture titled The Art of Conducting. In August 2014 he participated as an additional tutor at an international conducting masterclass held in Ruse.

In November 2025 he was invited as a guest teacher at the China Conservatory of Music in Beijing, where he led a masterclass in conducting comprising lectures on the art of conducting and practical work with students on technique, interpretation, and score analysis.

=== Competitions and jury work ===
Todorov has served as jury member of the International Blue Danube Competition for Conductors (2013) and as its chairman (2016).

In 2019 he chaired the jury of the Ghena Dimitrova International Singing Competition.

In 2021, he was a jury member of the Jeunesses Musicales International Conducting Competition in Bucharest, alongside Sigmund Thorp, Gabriel Bebeșelea, Christian Ehwald, Cristian Mandeal, Bujor Prelipcean, and Andras Vass.

In June 2022, he served on the jury of the second edition of the International Arthur Nikisch Conducting Competition, with jury president Philippe Entremont.

In 2025, he was president of the jury of the second International Ferenc Fricsay Conducting Competition in Szeged, Hungary.

In 2026, Todorov was artistic director of the Sofia International Conducting Competition, held at Bulgaria Hall from 22 February to 1 March 2026 with the Sofia Philharmonic Orchestra.

== Literary work ==
In 2021, Todorov published his debut collection of short stories, A Whiff of Angels (Bulgarian: Дъх на ангели).

== Political career ==
Todorov has served as Bulgaria's caretaker Minister of Culture on three occasions. He was first appointed in the caretaker government of Galab Donev from 3 February to 6 June 2023, succeeding Velislav Minekov and preceding Krastyu Krastev. He was appointed for a second time in the caretaker government of Dimitar Glavchev from 9 April 2024 to 16 January 2025, succeeding Krastyu Krastev and preceding Marian Bachev. His third appointment came in the caretaker government of Andrey Gyurov, from 19 February to 8 May 2026, succeeding Marian Bachev and preceding Evtim Miloshev. Throughout his tenures, Todorov consistently drew public attention to the absence of a long-term strategy for the development of Bulgarian culture, noting that although such a strategy is mandated by the Law on the Protection and Development of Culture, it had not been realised for over two decades.

== Awards and recognition ==
=== National awards ===
- Crystal Lyre award, multiple, beginning 2005; awarded by the Union of Bulgarian Musicians and Dancers
- Emil Chakarov Prize (2014)
- Honorary Citizen of Ruse (2015)
- "Musician of the Year", Bulgarian National Radio listeners' vote: 2012 and 2018
- Laureate of the Bulgarian National Radio's "Bulgarian Ambassadors of Culture" campaign (2021)
- Bogdan Bogdanov Prize for Humanities (2020)
- Sofia Municipality Prize for Culture (2022)
- Sofia Municipality Prize for the production of Gounod's Faust at the Sofia Opera
- "Golden Lyre" and "Golden Book" distinctions

=== International awards ===
- Award of the Slovak Music Fund
- Aquila d'Oro International Award (Italy, autumn 2023), presented at the Italian Embassy in Sofia at the 18th edition of the award ceremony, themed "Culture: the Phoenix of Civilization"
- Order of Cultural Merit in the rank of Grand Officer, awarded by the President of Romania (2024)
- Order of Arts and Letters in the rank of Chevalier (Knight), awarded by the Republic of France, presented by French Ambassador to Bulgaria Joël Meyer on behalf of French Minister of Culture Rachida Dati (2025)
