= Dobrin Petkov =

Bulgarian conductor (1923–1987)

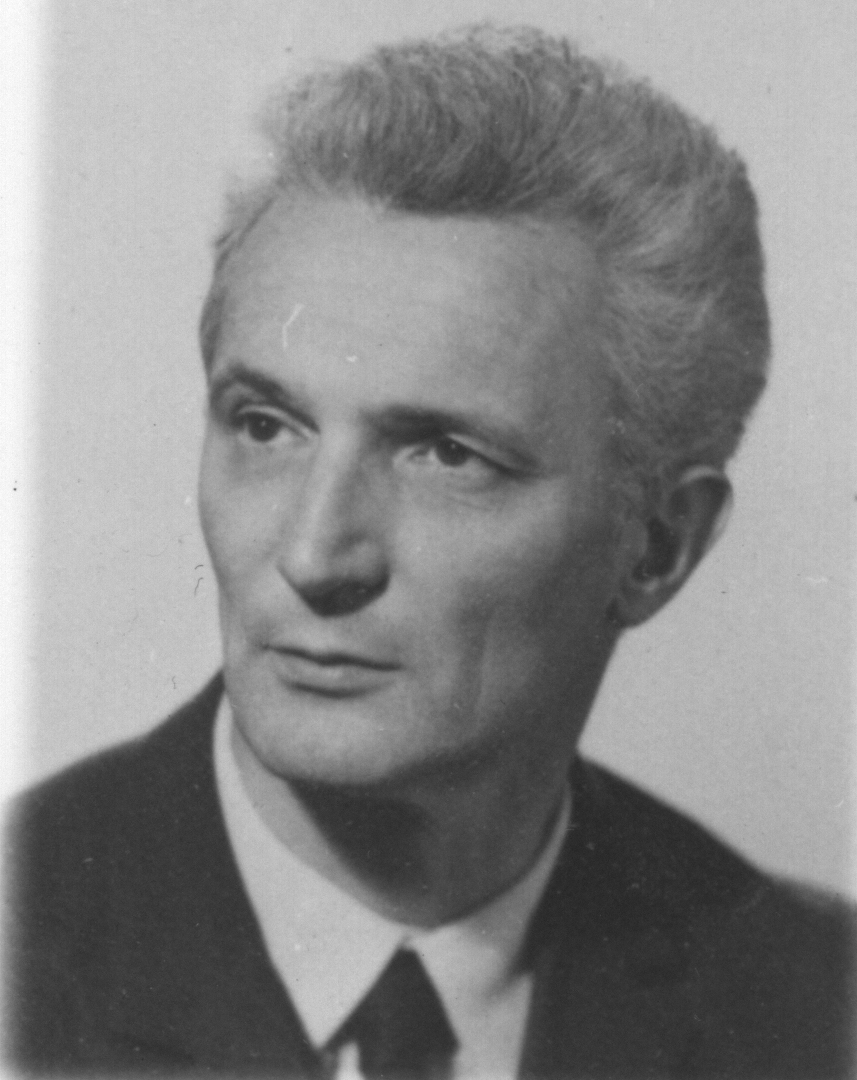
Dobrin Petkov

Dobrin Petkov (Bulgarian: Добрин Петков; 24 August 1923 – 10 February 1987) was a Bulgarian conductor.

== Life and career ==
Born in Dresden, Germany, Petkov was the son of a famous violin pedagogue, Hristo Petrov, whose students were leading musicians in Bulgaria and abroad. His mother, Tsvetana Zografova, studied singing in Vienna, Austria. She was a soloist of the Bulgarian Operetta Theatre, singing teacher and performer of chamber music.

Since his earliest childhood Dobrin Petkov demonstrated indisputable musical talents. He was only 5 years old when he started lessons with his father. He studied the violin with a persistence and interest that were unusual for a child, and at the age of 8 he played a sonata by Mozart before an audience. At 9 he had his first real concert in Sofia. At 11, he played Édouard Lalo's Symphonie espagnole with an orchestra. At 12, he conducted two musical works of a Children's Theatrical School in Belgrade and in Bulgaria, he also gave 20 violin concerts and one with Pancho Vladigerov in Belgrade. In 1937 on the insistence of the British Ambassador in Sofia, H.E. Mr. Charles Bentinck, a scholarship was granted for the first time to a Bulgarian to study violin and conducting at the Royal College of Music in London. The war brought him back to Bulgaria in 1939, where one after another followed high school, university, mobilisation, war, wounding... In 1946, after graduating the Musical Academy in Sofia with honours, he started working in the Sofia Philharmonic Orchestra as a violinist and conductor-trainee. In September 1950 he was appointed in Ruse. He had extremely intensive activity there, both as opera and symphony orchestra conductor. As a pedagogue he constantly worked with each member of the orchestra and with each singer. He was first violin in the then newly formed quartet and was several times soloist in the regular concerts. There were young and fervent years, during which his remarkable personality was built with incredible work, precision and love of art. During the 5 years in Rousse he conducted 143 opera performances and more than 100 concerts.

In 1956, he was appointed Chief Conductor in Plovdiv. In 1962, he was invited to become Chief Conductor of the Sofia National Opera. He made Mozart's Don Giovanni - a performance that is spoken about to this day. He was with the Sofia Philharmonic Orchestra from 1963 till 1969, and together they had tours in Beirut and Damascus, in Greece, Italy, France, the USSR, Germany etc. For personal and ethical reasons, he resigned and remained only part-time professor of conducting at the Musical Academy for four years. He had guest tours in Hungary, Poland, Czechoslovakia, Cuba, USSR, the DDR etc. In Plovdiv he staged The Magic Flute in 1971.

Maestro Petkov returned to Plovdiv for a second time as Chief Conductor, and remained there until his last days in 1987. In addition to the orchestra's very busy regular schedule, they had tours in the German Democratic Republic, Czechoslovakia, Spain, Italy, USSR and elsewhere, always with great enthusiasm and superlative critic reviews (Venezuela, Romania, Greece, Cuba etc.). In France they were invited in 1981 in the Théâtre du Châtelet together with the Chicago, Lyon, Berlin and Boston philharmonic orchestras.

In 1986 he made another opera in Plovdiv - Verdi's Otello - whose premiere won the admiration of music critics. He has also conducted numerous educational concerts before schoolchildren, university students, soldiers and ordinary people, as well as many concerts with young musicians-beginners. He also conducted many works by Bulgarian and foreign composers for the first time, devoting special attention to the Bulgarian authors: "There is always someone to take care about foreign authors. We should take care about ours."

== Personal life ==
His son, Hristo Petkov (b. 1954), is also a conductor.
