= National Opera and Ballet of Bulgaria =

National cultural institution

Coordinates: 42.6975°N 23.3305°E

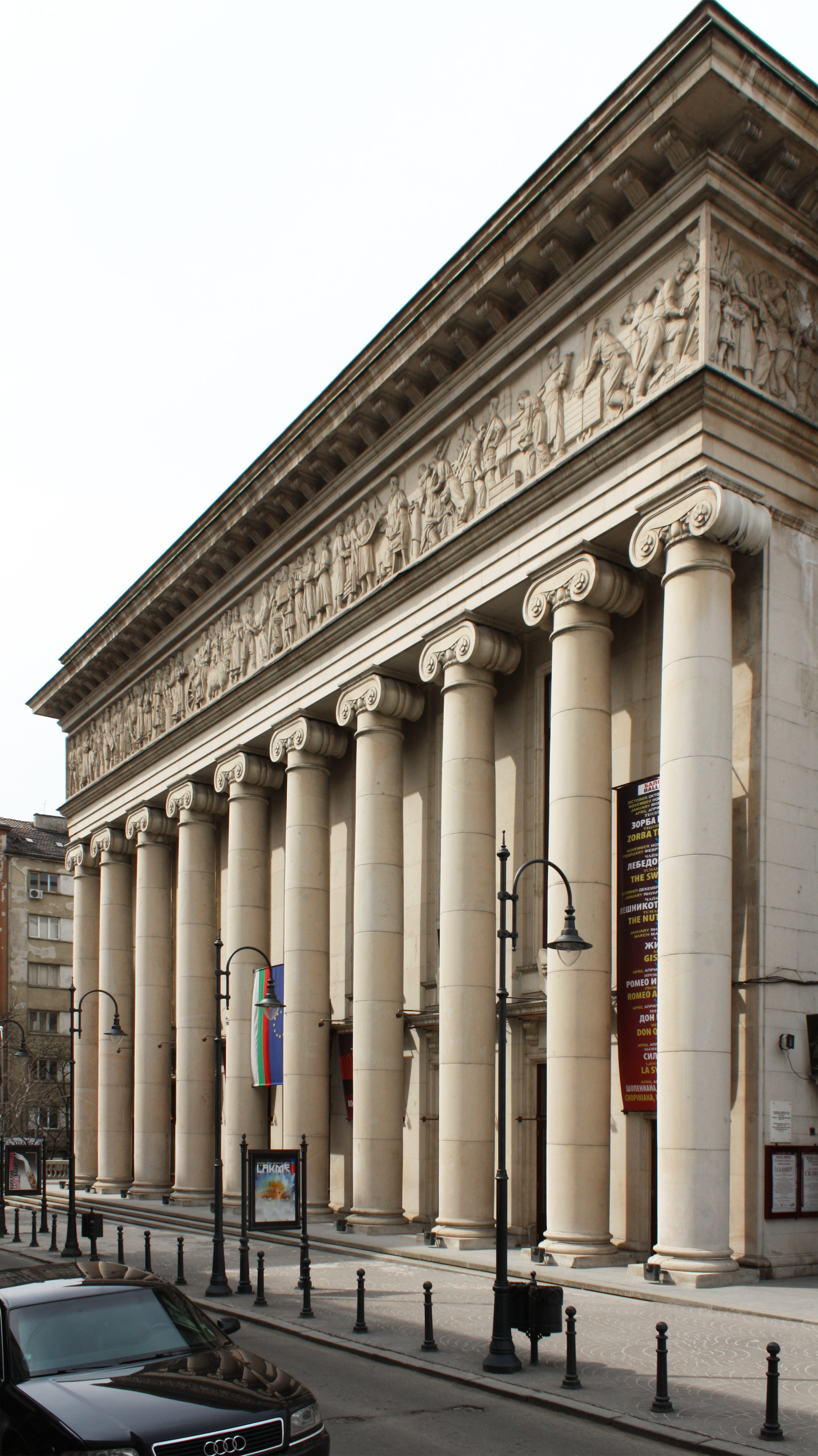
Facade of the National Opera and Ballet

The National Opera and Ballet (Bulgarian: Национална опера и балет) is a national cultural institution in Bulgaria that covers opera and ballet. It is based in an imposing building in Sofia, the capital of Bulgaria.

The first opera company in Bulgaria was founded in 1890 as part of the Capital Opera and Drama Company. The two sections split in 1891 to form the Salza i Smyah theatrical company and the Capital Bulgarian Opera. It was, however, disbanded the next year due to lack of government funding and financial difficulties.

The Bulgarian Opera Society was established in 1908 and staged its first test performance. The first full opera was performed in 1909 — Pagliacci by Leoncavallo. The first Bulgarian opera works were also presented in the period, including Siromahkinya by Emanuil Manolov, Kamen i Tsena by Ivan Ivanov and Václav Kaucký, Borislav by Georgi Atanasov and Tahir Begovitsa by Dimitar Hadzhigeorgiev.

As the company evolved under the ensemble system and style, the permanent troupe of soloists, choir, orchestra, ballet, technical and production teams produced up to 10 opera and ballet premieres a year, in addition to concert programs. Gradually, the basic repertory of world opera classics was established at the same time as the theatre began to attract Bulgarian composers who created new national works. 20th Century performers such as Nicolai Ghiaurov, Nicola Ghiuselev, and Ghena Dimitrova began their careers within the structure of the National Opera, as did later singers such as Irena Petkova and Kiril Manolov.

The institution became a national one in 1922 and changed its name to National Opera. A ballet company was established and gave its first performance in 1928. The opera ceased its activity for a while after the 1944 bombing of Sofia, but was restored shortly afterward with a significant increase of government funding.

The National Opera and Ballet's building was designed in 1921 and built for the most part between 1947 and its opening in 1953.

In 2000, the company co-organized the Boris Christoff Twelfth International Competition for Young Opera Singers with the idea of attracting a younger audience and supporting young and upcoming singers.

The repertoire historically tended to favour the Italian and French repertoire with little Wagnerian tradition, although since 2010, the artistic director of the opera company Plamen Kartaloff began a Ring Cycle with entirely Bulgarian casts. Following the entry of Parsifal and Tristan und Isolde into the repertoire, the complete cycle was performed both in Moscow and Sofia during 2018.
