= List of Bulgarian films of the 1960s =

A list of the most notable films produced in Bulgaria during the 1960s ordered by year of release. For an alphabetical list of articles on Bulgarian films see Category:Bulgarian films.

== List ==
Title	Title (Latin) English	Director	Length	Cast	Notes
1960
Другото щастие	Drugoto shtastie An Other Happiness	Anton Marinovich	47 min	Bozhidara Tzekova, Banko Bankov, Kiril Yanev and Kunka Baeva	Black and White drama; Followed by Patyat minava prez Belovir
Пътят минава през Беловир	Patyat minava prez Belovir; The Road Is Going Through Belovir	Petar Vasilev	47 minutes	Apostol Karamitev, Valentina Borisova, Dimitar Panov and Georgi Popov	Black and White drama; Follows Drugoto shtastie
Бедната улица	Bednata ulitza Poor Man's Street	Hristo Piskov	97 minutes	Kosta Tsonev, Naum Shopov, Ivan Bratanov and Grigor Vachkov	Black and White
В тиха вечер	V tiha vecher On a Quiet Evening	Borislav Sharaliev	90 minutes	Lyubomir Dimitrov, Nevena Kokanova, Ivan Bratanov and Kosta Tsonev	Black and White war movie based on the novel by Emilian Stanev
Дом на две улици	Dom na dve ulitsi A House on Two Streets	Kiril Ilinchev	97 minutes	Sarkis Muhibyan, Antoniya Yaneva, Grigor Vachkov and Ivan Obretenov	Black and White
Отвъд хоризонта	Otvad horizonta Beyond the Horizon	Zahari Zhandov	106 minutes	Stefan Petrov, Bogomil Simeonov, Ivan Kondov and Petar Slabakov	Black and White Drama
Първи урок	Parvi urok First Lesson	Vladimir Petrov and Rangel Vulchanov	98 minutes	Korneliya Bozhanova, Georgi Naumov, Georgi Georgiev-Getz and Georgi Kaloyanchev	Black and White Bulgaria/Soviet Union co-production. Released under the title The Old Lady in the UK. Entered into the 1960 Cannes Film Festival
Случаен концерт	Sluchaen kontsert Accidental Concert	Kosta Naumov	87 minutes	Vladimir Trandafilov, Emilia Radeva, Ivan Obretenov and Nikolai Ghiaurov	Black and White Musical
Стубленските липи	Stublenskite lipi The Lindens of Stublen	Dako Dakovski	108 minutes	Miroslav Mindov, Ivan Bratanov, Konstantin Kisimov and Gratsiela Bachvarova	Black and White Drama based on a novel by Stoyan Daskalov
Хитър Петър	Hitar Petar; Sly Peter	Stefan Surchadzhiev	101 minutes	Rachko Yabandzhiev, Leo Conforti, Konstantin Kisimov and Anastasiya Bakardzhieva	Comedy about the famous Bulgarian folk tales character Hitar Petar
1961
А бяхме млади	A byahme mladi We Were Young	Binka Zhelyazkova	110 minutes	Dimitar Buynozov, Rumyana Karabelova, Georgi Georgiev-Getz, Dimitar Panov and Ivan Bratanov	Black and White Drama about the Bulgarian resistance during World War II. Received the 1959-1967 Golden Prize at the 2nd Moscow International Film Festival
Бъди щастлива, Ани!	Badi shtastliva, Ani! Be Happy, Ani!	Vladimir Yanchev	89 minutes	Nevena Kokanova, Kosta Tsonev, Asen Kisimov and Leda Taseva	Comedy
Вятърната мелница	Vyatarnata melnitsa The Windmill	Simeon Shivachev	80 minutes	Mihail Petrov, Konstantin Kisimov, Naicho Petrov and Vera Dragostinova	Family Adventure film
Краят на пътя	Krayat na patya At the End of the Road	Petar Vasilev	82 minutes	Asen Milanov, Nikolay Galabov, Valentina Borisova, Dimitar Panov and Leo Conforti	Black and White Crime film
Маргаритка	Margaritka	Gencho Genchev	87 minutes	Albena Salabasheva, Sonya Vasileva, Ivan Kondov and Georgi Anastasov	Black and White family film
Нощта срещу тринадесети	Noshtta sreshtu trinadesetii On the Eve of the 13th	Anton Marinovich	108 minutes	Apostol Karamitev, Kosta Tsonev, Georgi Georgiev-Getz and Ani Tsoneva	Black and White Crime film
Последният рунд	Posledniyat rund The Last Round	Lyudmil Kirkov	84 minutes	Anani Yavashev, Adriana Andreeva, Ivan Obretenov, Asen Kisimov, Tatyana Lolova and Nikola Anastasov	Black and White Crime film
Призори	Prizori; At the Break of the Dawn	Dimitar Petrov	74 minutes	Miroslav Mindov, Peter Slabakov, Ivan Obretenov and Neli Popova	Black and White Drama
Стръмната пътека	Stramnata pateka The Steep Path	Yanko Yankov	100 minutes	Lubomir Kabakchiyev, Georgi Georgiev-Getz, Ivan Bratanov and Nevena Kokanova	Black and White Drama
1962
Двама под небето	Dvama pod nebeto Two Under the Sky	Borislav Sharaliev	88 minutes	Apostol Karamitev, Violeta Doneva, Naum Shopov and Donka Sharalieva	Black and White
Златният зъб	Zlatniyat zab The Golden Tooth	Anton Marinovich	104 minutes	Georgi Georgiev-Getz, Georgi Kaloyanchev, Ivan Andonov and Kosta Tsonev	Black and White Crime
Пленено ято	Pleneno yato Captive Flock	Ducho Mundrov	91 minutes	Asen Kisimov, Peter Slabakov, Lili Raynova and Dimitar Buynozov	Black and White film based on Emil Manov's novel and entered into the 1962 Cannes Film Festival
Слънцето и сянката	Slantzeto i syankata Sun and Shadow	Rangel Vulchanov	75 minutes	Georgi Naumov, Anna Prucnal, Gustaw Holoubek and Rangel Vulchanov	Black and White; FIPRESCI prize for Rangel Vulchanov
Специалист по всичко	Spetzialist po vsichko Jack-of-All-Trades	Petar Vasilev	90 minutes	Apostol Karamitev, Georgi Kaloyanchev, Ginka Stancheva and Stoyanka Mutafova	Black and White Comedy
Тютюн	Tyutyun; Tobacco	Nikola Korabov	150 minutes	Nevena Kokanova, Yordan Matev, Petar Slabakov and Georgi Kaloyanchev	Black and White Drama based on Dimitar Dimov's novel and entered into the 1963 Cannes Film Festival
Хроника на чувствата	Hronika na chuvstvata A Chronicle of Sentiments	Lyubomir Sharlandzhiev	83 minutes	Vasil Popiliev, Grigor Vachkov, Djoko Rosic and Iossif Surchadzhiev	Black and White Drama
Царска милост	Tsarska milost Tsar's Pardon	Stefan Surchadzhiev	96 minutes	Ivanka Dimitrova, Ivan Dimov, Tzeno Kandov and Georgi Popov	Black and White Drama
1963
Анкета	Anketa; An Investigation	Kiril Ilinchev	72 minutes	Ivan Andonov, Asen Milanov, Leda Taseva and Konstantin Kotsev	Black and White Drama based on Georgi Markov's novel
Инспекторът и нощта	Inspektorat i noshtta The Inspector and the Night	Rangel Vulchanov		Georgi Kaloyanchev, Nevena Kokanova, Leo Conforti, Stefan Danailov, Dimitar Panov and Naum Shopov	Black and White Crime film based on Bogomil Raynov's novel
Калоян	Kaloyan	Yuriy Arnaudov and Dako Dakovski	107 minutes	Vasil Stoychev, Andrey Mihaylov, Tzvetana Maneva and Ivan Stefanov	History film about Tsar Kaloyan of Bulgaria
Капитанът	Kapitanat; The Captain	Dimitar Petrov	80 minutes	Rayko Bodurov, Vladimir Bratanov, Katya Filipova and Petar Slabakov	Family/Kids film
Легенда за Паисий	Legenda za Paisiy; Legend of Paisiy	Stefan Surchadzhiev	81 minutes	Viktor Danchenko, Ivan Kondov, Lyubomir Bobchevski and Kunka Baeva	Black and White Drama telling the story of Paisius of Hilendar
На тихия бряг	Na tihiya bryag On the Quiet Shore	Gencho Genchev	89 minutes	Borislava Kuzmanova, Ivan Kasabov, Georgi Cherkelov and Ivan Bratanov	Black and White
Смърт няма	Smart nyama There Is No Death	Irina Aktasheva and Hristo Piskov	88 minutes	Peter Slabakov, Grigor Vachkov, Djoko Rosic and Kosta Tsonev	Black and White Crime film based on Todor Monov's novel
Среднощна среща	Srednoshtna sreshta Midnight Meeting	Nikola Minchev	70 minutes	Nevena Kokanova, Ivan Bratanov, Kunka Baeva and Nikola Popov	Black and White Drama
1964
Веригата	Verigata; The Chain	Lyubomir Sharlandzhiev	93 minutes	Vasil Popiliev, Ivan Bratanov, Grigor Vachkov and Leo Conforti	Black and White Drama/War film
Ивайло	Ivaylo	Nikola Valchev	86 minutes	Bogomil Simeonov, Ginka Stancheva, Ivan Bratanov and Tzvyatko Nikolov	History film telling the story of Ivailo of Bulgaria
Конникът	Konnikat; The Horseman	Georgi Alurkov	71 minutes	Stefan Ilyev, Ivan Bratanov, Petar Slabakov and Yanush Alurkov	Black and White Drama
Крадецът на праскови	Kradetzat na praskovi The Peach Thief	Vulo Radev	105 minutes	Nevena Kokanova, Rade Marković, Mikhail Mikhajlov and Naum Shopov	Black and White Drama film based on Emilian Stanev's novel
Между релсите	Mezhdu relsite Between the Rails	Vili Tzankov	100 minutes	Margarita Chudinova, Leda Taseva, Petar Slabakov and Ivan Bratanov	Black and White Drama film based on Svoboda Bachvarova's novel
Невероятна история	Neveroyatna istoriya Incredible Story	Vladimir Yanchev	90 minutes	Georgi Cherkelov, Rangel Vulchanov, Georgi Kaloyanchev, Georgi Kaloyanchev and Grigor Vachkov	Black and White Comedy written by Radoy Ralin
Незавършени игри	Nezavarsheni igri Unfinished Games	Simeon Shivachev	82 minutes	Ivan Enchev, Dolya Popova, Dinko Dinev and Mihail Mihaylov	Black and White Drama
Непримиримите	Neprimirimite; The Intransigents	Yanko Yankov	81 minutes	Ivan Raev, Dušica Žegarac, Georgi Georgiev-Getz and Petar Slabakov	Black and White Drama/War film
Приключение в полунощ	Priklyuchenie v polunosht Adventure at Midnight	Anton Marinovich	96 minutes	Lyubomir Dimitrov, Georgi Cherkelov, Djoko Rosic and Yuriy Yakovlev	Black and White film based on Andrey Gulyashki's novel
13 дни	trinadeset dni Thirteen Days	Stefan Surchadzhiev	84 minutes	Emil Stefanov, Asen Kisimov, Kunka Baeva and Mikail Mihaylov	Black and White Drama film based on the novel Nezabravimi dni by Andrey Gulyashki
Търси се спомен	Tarsi se spomen Looking for a Remembrance	Rangel Vulchanov	21 minutes	Viktor Chichov and Rangel Vulchanov	Black and White Short film
Черната река	Chernata reka The Black River	Zahari Zhandov	75 minutes	Georgi Georgiev-Getz, Zhorzheta Chakarova, Vessela Radoyeva and Nikola Dadov	Black and White
1965
Васката	Vaskata	Borislav Sharaliev	19 minutes	Ilia Dobrev, Severina Teneva, Mladen Kiselov and Marin Yanev	Short Black and White film
ВУЛА	Vula; Bull	Nikola Korabov	N/A	Nadezhda Randzheva, Ivan Manov, Ivan Bratanov and Mikhail Mikhajlov	Black and white, entered into the 4th Moscow International Film Festival
Вълчицата	Valchitsata; The She-Wolf	Rangel Vulchanov	85 minutes	Ilka Zafirova, Georgi Kaloyanchev, Naum Shopov and Georgi Cherkelov	Black and White drama
До града е близо	Do grada e blizo The City Is Nearby	Gencho Genchev	84 minutes	Lyudmila Cheshmedzhieva, Ivan Andonov, Naum Shopov and Georgi Cherkelov	Black and White based on a novel by Geno Genov
Дрямка	Dryamka; Doze	Georgi Stoyanov	22 minutes	Mihail Mihaylov, Ilka Zafirova, Krikor Azaryan and Leda Taseva	Short black-and-white film
Краят на една ваканция	Krayat na edna vakantziya The End of the Summer Holidays	Lyudmil Kirkov	77 minutes	Sashka Karamiltzev and Evgeni Statelov	Black and White drama
Късче небе за трима	Kasche nebe za trima A Bit of Heaven for Three	Kiril Ilinchev	88 minutes	Lyubomir Kiselichki, Georgi Nikolov, Radoslav Stoilov and Lyudmila Cheshmedzhieva	Black and White drama
Неспокоен дом	Nespokoen dom Troubled Home	Yakim Yakimov	89 minutes	Ivan Kondov, Emilia Radeva, Elena Rainova and Lili Ivanova	Black and White based on a novel by Pavel Vezhinov
Паролата	Parolata; The Password	Petar Vasilev	93 minutes	Assen Milanov, Ivan Bratanov, Naicho Petrov and Veli Chaushev	Black and White
Произшествие на сляпата улица	Proizshestvie na slyapata ulitza Incident on the Dead-End Street	Vladislav Ikonomov and Lyudmil Kirkov	84 min	Naum Shopov, Svetoslav Peev, Wojciech Pszoniak and Beata Tyszkiewicz	Black and White crime film in five episodes
Русият и Гугутката	Rusiyat i Gugutkata; The Blonde and the Turtle-Dove	Nedelcho Chernev	65 minutes	Petar Chernev and Georgi Kaloyanchev	Black and White drama
Старинната монета	Starinnata moneta Die Antike Münze (German); The Ancient Coin (English)	Vladimir Yanchev	82 minutes	Manfred Krug, Liana Antonova, Grigor Vachkov and Willi Schrade	Musical Comedy - Bulgaria/East Germany co-production
1966
Вечен календар	Vechen kalendar Almanac	Petar Donev	83 minutes	Margarita Pehlivanova, Ivan Bratanov, Stefan Mavrodiev and Djoko Rosic	Black-and-white drama
Горещо пладне	Goreshto pladne Torrid Noon	Zako Heskija	89 minutes	Plamen Nakov, Petar Slabakov, Grigor Vachkov and Rousy Chanev	black-and-white film based on a novel by Yordan Radichkov. Director Zako Heskija received a Golden palm nomination at the 1965 Cannes Film Festival.
Джеси Джеймс срещу Локум Шекеров	Dzhesi Dzeyms sreshtu Lokum Shekerov; Jesse James vs. Lokum Shekerov	Rangel Vulchanov	51 minutes	Georgi Kaloyanchev, Grigor Vachkov, Stoyanka Mutafova and Georgi Cherkelov	Black-and-white comedy
Заветът на инката	Zavetut na inkata Das Vermächtnis des Inka (German); El Último rey de los incas (Spanish); Viva Gringo (Italian); Legacy of the Incas (English)	Georg Marischka	100 minutes	Guy Madison, Rik Battaglia, Fernando Rey and William Rothlein	Western based on the novel by Karl May - Spain/Italy/ Bulgaria/West Germany co-production
Карамбол	Karambol; Crack-Up	Lyubomir Sharlandzhiev	84 minutes	Nevena Kokanova, Anani Yavashev, Elena Rainova and Assen Milanov	Black-and-white drama based on a novel by Atanas Tzenev
Между двамата	Mezhdu dvamata Between parents	Dimitar Petrov	81 minutes	Georgi Georgiev-Getz, Ivan Bratanov, Yanush Alurkov and Violeta Minkova	Black-and-white family film
Мъже	Mazhe; Men	Vasil Mirchev	92 minutes	Sava Hashamov, Dobromir Manev, Rumyana Karabelova and Georgi Georgiev-Getz	Black-and-white drama based on a novel by Georgi Markov
Началото на една ваканция	Nachaloto na edna vakantziya The Start of the Summer Holidays	Zako Heskija	77 minutes	Dilyana Bachvarova, Maya Dragomanska, Georgi Rusev and Todor Pavlov	Black-and-white family film based on a novel by Gercho Atanasov
Понеделник сутрин	Ponedelnik sutrin Monday Morning	Irina Aktasheva and Hristo Piskov	106 minutes	Pepa Nikolova, Asen Kisimov, Petar Slabakov and Stefan Danailov	Black-and-white drama
Призованият не се яви	Prizovaniyat ne se yavi Subpoenaed Didn't Come	Vladislav Ikonomov	68 minutes	Assen Milanov, Slavka Slavova, Ivan Kasabov and Vasil Popiliev	Black-and-white drama
Рицар без броня	Ritzar bez bronya Knight Without Armour	Borislav Sharaliev	85 minutes	Apostol Karamitev, Oleg Kovachev, Oleg Popov and Mariya Rusalieva	Black-and-white film about a nine-year-old boy between the world of games and the world of adults. Best Film about Adolescence award at the San Marco film festival
Семейство Калинкови	Semeystvo Kalinkovi; Kalinkov Family	Dimitar Zahariev	28 minutes	Ivan Kondov, Georgi Cherkelov, Kunka Baeva and Mariya Rusalieva	Blank and white family film in 12 episodes
Цар и генерал	Tsar i general Tsar and General	Vulo Radev	76 minutes	Petar Slabakov, Naum Shopov, Rousy Chanev and Georgi Cherkelov	black-and-white drama about the conflicts between Boris III of Bulgaria and his general Vladimir Zaimov during World War II
1967
Ако не иде влак	Ako ne ide vlak If a Train Is Not Coming	Eduard Zahariev	37 minutes	Andrey Avramov, Naum Shopov, Kiril Yanev and Stefan Mavrodiyev	Black-and-white short Bulgaria/Hungary co-production
Бягаща по вълните	Byagashta po valnite/Running on the Waves	Pavel Lyubimov	94 minutes	Sava Hashamov, Rolan Bikov, Natasha Bogunova and Pepa Nikolova	Black-and-white fantasy Bulgaria/Soviet Union co-production based on a novel by Alexander Grin
В края на лятото	V kraya na lyatoto The End of the Summer	Ducho Mundrov	81 minutes	Petar Slabakov, Ilka Zafirova, Ani Bakalova and Georgi Naumov	Black-and-white psychological drama based on a novel by Emil Manov
Есен	Esen; Autumn	Petar Donev	22 minutes		Black-and-white documentary film
Морето	Moreto; The sea	Petar Donev	64 minutes	Stefan Danailov, Severina Teneva and Itzhak Finzi	Black-and-white drama
Мълчаливите пътеки	Malchalivite pateki Quiet Paths	Vladislav Ikonomov	76 minutes	Georgi Cherkelov, Mihail Mihaylov, Stefan Mavrodiev and Stefan Danailov	Black-and-white drama
Най-дългата нощ	Nay-dalgata nosht The Longest Night	Vulo Radev	96 minutes	Victor Rebengiuc, Nevena Kokanova, Georgi Kaloyanchev, Ivan Bratanov, Georgi Georgiev-Getz, Petar Slabakov, Georgi Rusev and Maya Dragomanska	Black-and-white drama taking place during World War II
Отклонение	Otklonenie; Detour	Grisha Ostrovski and Todor Stoyanov	78 minutes	Nevena Kokanova, Ivan Andonov, Katya Paskaleva and Dorotea Toncheva	Black-and-white drama. Won the FIPRESCI and the Golden prize at the 5th Moscow International Film Festival and had a Grand Prix nomination
По тротоара	Po trotoara On the Pavement	Anton Marinovich	88 minutes	Ivan Andonov, Ani Bakalova, Ivan Bratanov and Djoko Rosic	Black-and-white drama
Привързаният балон	Privarzaniyat balon The Tied Up Balloon	Binka Zhelyazkova	98 minutes	Georgi Kaloyanchev, Grigor Vachkov, Ivan Bratanov, Konstantin Kotsev, Georgi Georgiev-Getz, Konstantin Kisimov and Georgi Partsalev	Black-and-white fantasy drama about a large balloon that occupies the attention of a whole village; based on the story by Yordan Radichkov
С дъх на бадеми	S dah na bademi Taste of Almonds	Lyubomir Sharlandzhiev	72 minutes	Nevena Kokanova, Georgi Georgiev-Getz, Dorotea Toncheva and Stefan Danailov	Black-and-white crime story written by Pavel Vezhinov
С пагоните на дявола	S pagonite na dyavola With the Devil's Shoulder Straps	Nedelcho Chernev	230 minutes	Dimitar Buynozov, Ani Bakalova, Ivan Kondov and Mihail Mihaylov	Black-and-white adventure in five episodes
Свирачът	Sviracht; The Clown and the Kids	Mende Brown	102 minutes	Emmett Kelly, Burt Stratford, Katie Dunn, Mihail Mihaylov and Leo Conforti	Kids Musical; Bulgaria/US co-production
Случаят Пенлеве	Sluchayat Penleve; The Penleve Case	Georgi Stoyanov	80 minutes	Naum Shopov, Konstantin Kotsev, Emilia Radeva and Tatyana Lolova	Black-and-white drama in three episodes
Човекът в сянка	Chovekat v syanka Man in the Shadow	Yakim Yakimov	92 minutes	Stanya Mihailov, Ivan Kondov, Elena Rainova and Mihail Mihaylov	Black-and-white spy film based on a novel by Pavel Vezhinov
1968
Бялата стая	Byalata staya The White Room	Metodi Andonov	83 minutes	Apostol Karamitev, Dorotea Toncheva, Konstantin Kotsev, Georgi Cherkelov, Stoyanka Mutafova, Georgi Kaloyanchev and Grigor Vachkov	Black-and-white drama about an ill man who evaluates his life in the face of death - based on the novel by Bogomil Raynov
Гибелта на Александър Велики	Gibelta na Aleksander Veliki; The Death of Alexander the Great	Vladislav Ikonomov	85 minutes	Grigor Vachkov, Nevena Kokanova, Zhorzheta Chakarova and Martina Vachkova	Black-and-white film about the never-ending construction in Bulgaria during the second half of the sixties
Галилео Галилей	Galileo Galilei; Galileo	Liliana Cavani	105 minutes	Cyril Cusack, Georgi Kaloyanchev, Georgi Cherkelov, Mihail Mihaylov and Nevena Kokanova	Italy/Bulgaria co-production telling the story of Galileo Galilei
Небето на Велека	Nebeto na Veleka; The Sky Over the Veleka	Eduard Zahariev	90 minutes	Georgi Georgiev-Getz, Mihail Mihaylov, Georgi Kaloyanchev and Naum Shopov	Black-and-white drama
Опасен полет	Opasen polet Perilous Flight	Dimitar Petrov	72 minutes	Preslav Petrov, Nevena Kokanova, Petar Slabakov and Georgi Cherkelov	Crime film
Последният войвода	Posledniat voyvoda The Last Voivode	Nikola Valchev	91 minutes	Vasil Popiliev, Bogomil Simeonov, Emil Grekov and Nikola Anastasov	Black-and-white film telling the story of a Bulgarian revolutionary leader
Прокурорът	Prokurorat; The Prosecutor	Lyubomir Sharlandzhiev	77 minutes	Georgi Georgiev-Getz, Yordan Matev, Olga Kircheva and Dorotea Toncheva	Black-and-white drama based on a play by Georgi Dzhagarov
Процесът	Procesat; The Trial	Yakim Yakimov	90 minutes	Ivan Kondov, Branimira Antonova, Ivan Andonov and Vasil Bachvarov	Black-and-white drama
Първият куриер	Parviyat kurier Russian: Первый курьер English: The First Courier	Vladimir Yanchev	91 minutes	Stefan Danailov, Zhanna Bolotova, Vladimir Retsepter and Evgeni Leonov	Historical drama - Bulgaria/Soviet Union co-production
Шведските крале	Shvedskite krale The Swedish Kings	Lyudmil Kirkov	87 minutes	Kiril Gospodinov, Tzvetana Maneva, Nikola Rudarov, Stefan Mavrodiyev and Evstati Stratev	Black-and-white drama
Шибил	Shibil	Zahari Zhandov	90 minutes	Petar Slabakov, Dorotea Toncheva, Elena Hranova and Ivan Bratanov	drama about a ferocious outlaw who falls in love - based on the novel by Gencho Stoyev
1969
Армандо	Armando	Lyudmil Kirkov	37 minutes	Konstantin Kotsev, Asen Georgiev, Yevstati Stratev and Vasil Popov	Short drama film
Белият кон	Beliyat kon The White Horse	Milen Nikolov	36 minutes	Grigor Vachkov, Ilia Dobrev and Yevstati Stratev	Short black-and-white drama film
Господин Никой	Gospodin Nikoy; Mister Nobody	Ivan Terziev	107 minutes	Kosta Tsonev, Georgi Cherkelov, Marita Böhme, Nikola Anastasov and Mihail Mihaylov	Black-and-white crime film
Един миг свобода	Edin mig svoboda Moment of Freedom	Ivanka Grybcheva and Petar Kaishev	66 minutes	Stoycho Mazgalov, Dorotea Toncheva, Vassil Mihaylov and Mihail Mihaylov	Black-and-white film based on a novel by Radi Radev
Един снимачен ден	Edin snimachen den A Shooting Day	Borislav Sharaliev	54 minutes	Apostol Karamitev, Nikola Rudarov, Vasil Tsonev and Yevstati Stratev	Black-and-white film about a shooting crew that can never get the final scene done
Иконостасът	Ikonostasat; The Icon Stand	Christo Christov and Todor Dinov	95 minutes	Dimitar Tashev, Emilia Radeva, Naum Shopov and Dobrinka Stankova	black-and-white film telling the story of an icon painter during the Bulgarian National Revival
Любовницата на Граминя	Lyubovnitzite na Graminya; English: The Bandit; Italian: L'Amante di Gramigna	Carlo Lizzani	108 minutes	Gian Maria Volonté, Stefania Sandrelli, Stoyanka Mutafova and Petar Slabakov	Italy/Bulgaria co-production
Мъже в командировка	Mazhe v komandirovka Men on a Business Trip	Grisha Ostrovski and Todor Stoyanov	95 minutes	Zhorzheta Chakarova, Ivan Andonov, Nevena Kokanova and Georgi Cherkelov	based on the novels by Lyuben Stanev
На всеки километър	Na vseki kilometar At Each Kilometer	Nedelcho Chernev and Lyubomir Sharlandzhiev	62 minutes	Stefan Danailov, Grigor Vachkov, Georgi Cherkelov and Georgi Georgiev-Getz	The first season of the most popular Bulgarian serial film (stretches into 13 episodes) - follows the story of an agent of the Communist resistance during World War II
Осмият	Osmiyat; The Eighth	Zako Heskija	107 minutes	Georgi Georgiev-Getz, Nikola Anastasov, Anton Gorchev and Djoko Rosic	Black and White film about the anti-fascist resistance during WWII
Признание	Priznanie; Confession	Yanko Yankov	86 minutes	Stoycho Mazgalov, Djoko Rosic, Nikola Rudarov and Nikola Anastasov	Black and White film based on a novel by Dimitar Valev
Птици и хрътки	Ptitzi i hratki Birds and Greyhounds	Georgi Stoyanov	79 minutes	Stefan Mavrodiyev, Kirill Gospodinov, Tatyana Lolova and Itzhak Finzi	Black-and-white comedy
Свобода или смърт	Svoboda ili smart Freedom or Death	Nikola Korabov	91 minutes	Milen Penev, Kosta Tsonev, Apostol Karamitev and Ivan Bratanov	Film about the deeds of one of the greatest Bulgarian revolutionaries Hristo Botev
Скорпион срещу Дъга	Skorpion sreshtu Daga; Scorpion Versus Rainbow	Vladislav Ikonomov	96 minutes	Vasil Popiliev, Naum Shopov, Katya Paskaleva and Stefan Mavrodiyev	Black-and-white adventure film
Село край завод	Selo kray zavod Village by a Plant	Petar Batalov	86 minutes	Violeta Bahchevanova, Petar Slabakov, Naicho Petrov and Lidiya Grigorova	Black-and-white drama
Танго	Tango	Vasil Mirchev	76 minutes	Nevena Kokanova, Petar Penkov, Petar Slabakov and Grigor Vachkov	Black-and-white drama, entered into the 6th Moscow International Film Festival
Тръгни на път	Trugni na put Set Out Again	Petar Donev	88 minutes	Nikolai Uzunov, Georgi Georgiev-Getz, Stefan Rusinov and Djoko Rosic	n/a
Цар Иван Шишман	Tzar Ivan Shishman	Yuriy Arnaudov	78 minutes	Stefan Getsov, Vancha Doycheva, Ruzha Delcheva and Mihail Mihaylov	Drama film about the Bulgarian ruler Tzar Ivan Shishman - based on a play by Kamen Zidarov
