= Radøy =

Radøy or Radoy may refer to:

== Places ==
- Radøy (island), an island in Alver Municipality in Vestland county, Norway
- Radøy Municipality, a former municipality in the old Hordaland county, Norway
- Radoy Ralin Peak, a peak in the Levski Ridge on Livingston Island in the South Shetland Islands, Antarctica

== People ==
- Radoy Ralin (1922-2004), a Bulgarian dissident, poet, and satirist
- Radoy Minkovski (born 1954), a Bulgarian football coach
