= List of Bulgarian films =

A list of the most notable films produced in Bulgaria ordered by year and decade of release. For an alphabetical list of articles on Bulgarian films see Category:Bulgarian films.

- List of Bulgarian films before 1950
- List of Bulgarian films of the 1950s
- List of Bulgarian films of the 1960s
- List of Bulgarian films of the 1970s
- List of Bulgarian films of the 1980s
- List of Bulgarian films of the 1990s
- List of Bulgarian films of the 2000s
- List of Bulgarian films of the 2010s
- List of Bulgarian films of the 2020s
