= Running on Waves =

1967 Soviet-Bulgarian film

- Russian: Бегущая по волнам
- Directed by: Pavel Lyubimov
- Written by: Aleksandr Galich; Alexander Grin; Stefan Tsanev
- Starring: Sava Hashamov; Rolan Bykov; Margarita Terekhova; Natalya Bogunova; Oleg Zhakov
- Cinematography: Stoyan Zlychkin
- Edited by: Elena Dimitrova; K. Malinskaya
- Music by: Yan Frenkel
- Release date: 1967
- Countries: Soviet Union; Bulgaria
- Language: Russian

Running on Waves (Russian: Бегущая по волнам, Bulgarian: Бягаща по вълните) is a 1967 Soviet-Bulgarian romantic drama film directed by Pavel Lyubimov.

== Plot ==
Harvey, a pianist exhausted from touring (played by Sava Hashimov), steps off a train at a small station to buy cigarettes. There, he learns from the vendor that the fictional towns created by Alexander Grin, such as Liss, are real and easily accessible by bus. Impulsively, Harvey decides to stay behind, abandoning his producer on the departing train, and sets off on foot to Liss. By morning, he arrives at the seaside town, where he meets an enchanting woman, Biche Seniel (portrayed by Margarita Terekhova), and falls in love with her at first sight. He also encounters Captain Gez (played by Rolan Bykov), the owner of the sailing ship The Running on Waves, and joins the crew as a passenger.

During the voyage, the ship stops in Dagon to take on several female passengers. After a heated argument with the drunken captain, who insults one of the women, Harvey is forcibly placed in a lifeboat and abandoned in the dark sea. While drifting and dozing on the waves, Harvey is visited by a mysterious woman resembling Biche, though she introduces herself as Fräzi Grant. She speaks to him, predicting that he will be rescued by a passing steamboat and meet a woman named Daisy. Her predictions come true as Harvey is saved and encounters Daisy, leading to a series of fateful events.

== Cast ==
- Sava Hashamov as Harvey
- Rolan Bykov as Captain Gez
- Margarita Terekhova as Biche Seniel / Frezi Grant
- Natalya Bogunova as Daisy
- Oleg Zhakov as Proctor
- Yevgeni Fridman as Butler
- Vasil Popiliev as Toboggan
- Yordan Matev as Commissar (as I. Matev)
- Ani Spasova
- N. Nikolayeva
