= Maria Toromanova-Hmelik =

Bulgarian actress

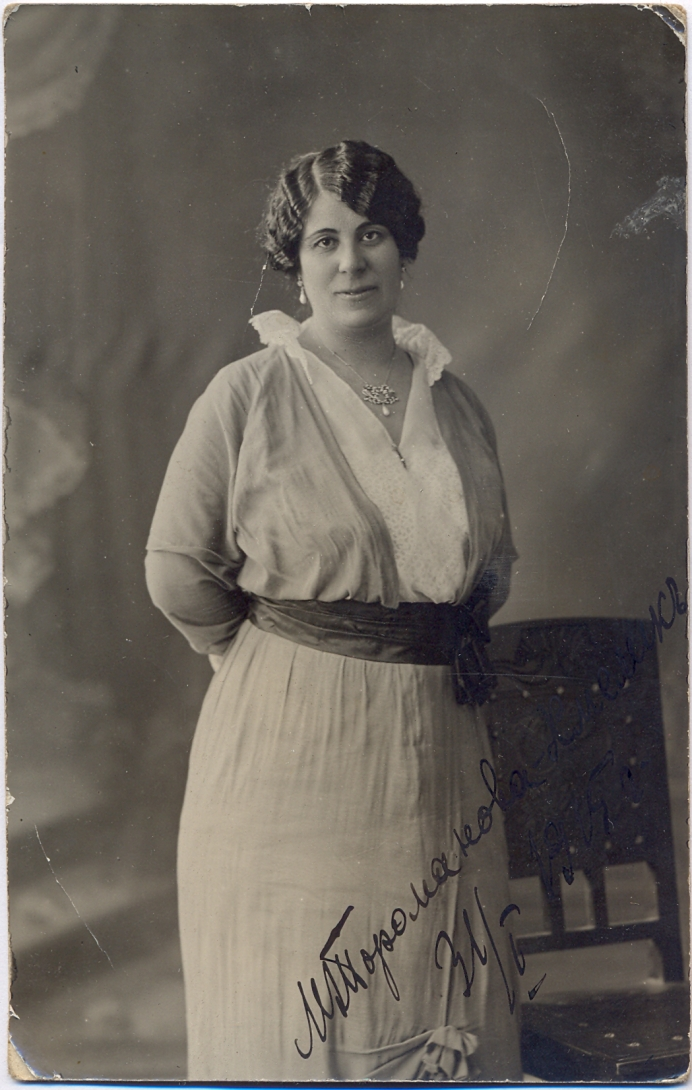
- Photo portrait of Maria Toromanova-Hmelik
- Born: Maria Nikolova Toromanova; 1876; Plovdiv, Bulgaria
- Died: 13 May 1929 (aged 52–53); Sofia. Bulgaria
- Occupation: Actress

Maria Toromanova-Hmelik (Bulgarian: Мария Тороманова-Хмелик; 1876 – 13 May 1929) was a Bulgarian actress, best known for her role in Love is Madness (1917).

== Biography ==
Maria Toromanova-Hmelik was born in Plovdiv in 1876, where she attended school. From 1894 to 1901 she worked as a teacher, participating in amateur theatrical performances.

In 1902 she made her debut in the New Drama Theatre "Tears and Laughter" (Bulgarian: Сълза и смях).

In the periods 1904–1910, 1911–1923 and 1925–1928, she appeared on the stage of the Ivan Vazov National Theatre. Between 1910 and 1911, she was an actress in the New National Theatre, and from 1918 until 1925, in the drama department of the Free Theatre.

During a visit to Prague in 1912, she became acquainted with Czech theatrical art. She died in Sofia on 13 May 1929.

Her great granddaughter is the Bulgarian actress Elena Dimitrova.

== Theatre roles ==
Maria Toromanova-Hmelik participated in many theatrical plays, the most influential of which were:

- Malama in Vampire by Anton Strashimirov
- Rebecca in Dobre Skoreniya Frak by Gabriel Dregeli
- Gertruda in Hamlet by William Shakespeare

== Filmography ==
Aside from her many theatre roles, she was in two Bulgarian movies:

- Aunt Kera in Love is Madness by Vasil Gendov (1917)
- Baba Tranka in Pod Staroto nebe, by Nikolay Larin (1922)

Love is Madness became the first Bulgarian film to be included in the National Film Archives of Bulgaria.
