= Bulgarian National Film Archive =

- Българска Национална Филмотека
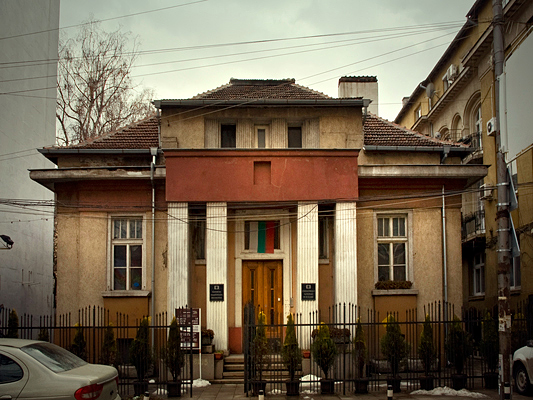
- Main facade of the head office
- Interactive map of the Bulgarian National Film Archive area

General information
- Architectural style: Art Deco
- Location: Sofia, Bulgaria
- Coordinates: 42°41′28″N 23°19′44″E

Website
- Bulgarian Cinematheque

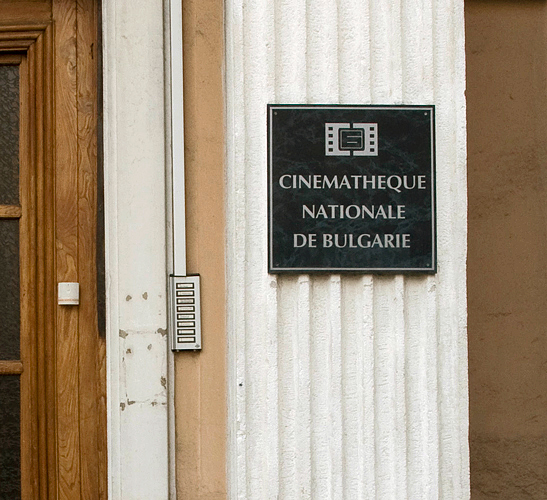
Cinematheque nameplate

The Bulgarian National Film Archive (Bulgarian: Българска Национална Филмотека), also known as the Bulgarian Cinematheque and informally as the Bulgarian National Film Library, is an organisation formed to acquire, restore, preserve, and store film and film-related archival artefacts of national and international culture.

== History ==
Since the year of the making of the first Bulgarian feature film Bulgaran is Gallant is disputable, the exact date of foundation of the Film Archive also varies in the memories of the people who worked there. Howsoever it corresponds with the period when the first national film archives were established. For instance, it is reported that the first film archives are found during 1935 in London and New York City followed by the French one in 1936.

When the communist regime took the rule in the country, the Bulgarian film-making was nationalised. Subsequently, in 1948 a National Film Museum was founded. Its beginnings were laid again by the pioneer of Bulgarian cinema Vasil Gendov. He collected the film-copies of the distribution net as well as of the nationalised distributors and also found and restored posters, photos and materials about our film-making history. The collection started with 154 newsreels, 117 short films, most of them shot by foreign cameramen, 15 Bulgarian feature films, 500 foreign feature films and about 550 Bulgarian documentaries and popular science films.

The first official documents manifested the foundation of the Film Archive in 1952 as a part of the nationalised Bulgarian cinematography. The General department of archives in Bulgaria methodically guided the work of the Film Archive in those years.

Since 1959, it is a member of the International Federation of Film Archives.

In 1994, after the fall of Communism, the Council of Ministers determined the status of the Bulgarian National Film Archive as a cultural institution of national significance. It is a legal entity funded by government, under the auspices of the Ministry of Culture.

== Description ==
The head office of the Bulgarian National Film Archive, also known as the Bulgarian Cinematheque and informally as the Bulgarian National Film Library, is accommodated in an old Art Deco-style house located in the Sofia city center. The very archive is currently stored in three cities: Sofia, Stara Zagora, and Belogradchik. The main base where the film collection is held is located in the Boyana Film Centre, a suburb of Sofia.

The institution is organised into several departments: Directorate; Administrative; Film Collection; Information, Repertoire, and Programming; and the Odeon Cinema Hall.

The logo of the Bulgarian National Film Archive was designed by Stefan Kanchev, the "father of Bulgarian graphic design".

== Odeon Cinema ==
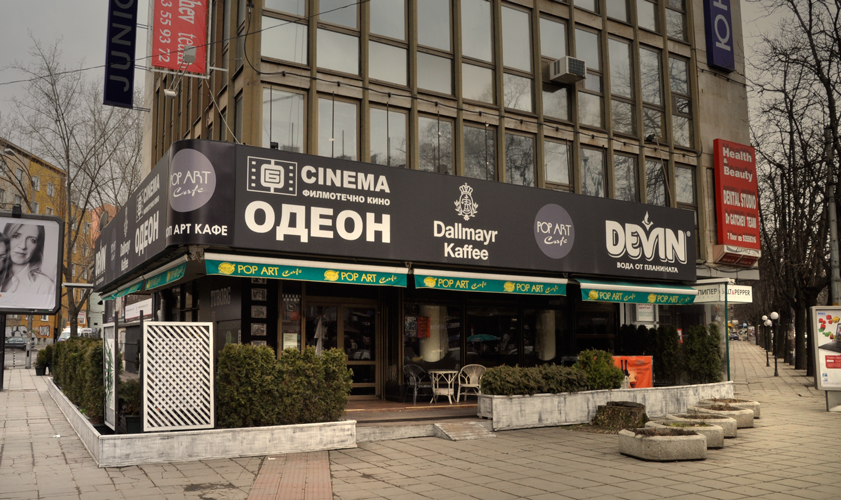
Odeon Cinema in Sofia, 2010

Since it is typical for the film archive institutions to have in their structure small cinemas that screens particularly classic and art-house films, the Bulgarian one has a cinema hall too. It is named "Odeon" and located in Sofia city center too, not far from the head office house.

Initially the cinema was opened in 1961 in the hall of the Arts and Culture Club at 108 Rakovski st. After some break the Film Archive rented Vlaikova Cinema hall in 1969 with consideration to convert it into specialised cinematheque cinema. Soon the screenings in this hall were ceased too, only to be continued at the newly opened Vitosha cinema. A year later the Film Archive got its own hall named Druzhba Cinema. In 1991, after the fall of the Communist regime it was renamed "Odeon Cinematheque cinema". Being a specialized cinema it organises its program in cycles, arranges special weeks, foreign film reviews, celebrations of local and international artists.

The hall is housed on the ground floor in a seven-storey corner building. It is situated by one of the Sofia landmarks - the Patriarch Evtimiy Square with the monument of Evtimiy of Tarnovo, Patriarch of Bulgaria. The place is also a popular meeting point for the residents of the city.

== Collection ==
The Bulgarian Cinematheque holds the national film archive, which as of 2025 consisted of 15,000 titles, with more than 40,000 copies or 300,000 film reels.

As of 2025 there are 9,528 Bulgarian films, including:

- 5,844 documentaries and popular science films
- 2,364 newsreels
- 700 feature films
- 620 animations, newsreels, chronicles, and periodicals

The foreign collection includes 4,348 items from 54 countries:

- 3,589 feature films
- 625 documentaries
- 134 animations

The collection is enlarged and enriched mainly with films made by studios around the country, international exchange, or donations. The Archive also holds more than 3000 videotapes.

The Bulgarian Film Archive holds a large related non-film collection, consisting of:

- 10,000 volumes of books and magazines
- 27,000 unique posters
- 118,000 photos
- 15,600 dialogue lists
- more than 600 records of Bulgarian feature films
