= List of Bulgarian films before 1950 =

A list of the most notable films produced in Bulgaria in 1910-1949 ordered by year and decade of release. For an alphabetical list of articles on Bulgarian films see.

== 1910s ==
Title	Title (Latin) English	Director	Notes
1915
Българан е галант	Bulgaran is Gallant	Vasil Gendov	feature-length silent comedy (lost except for 1-2 frames)
1917
Баронът	Baronet	Kevork Kuyumdjian	feature film
Богдан Стимов	Bogdan Stimov	Georg Jacoby	feature film
Любовта е лудост	Love Is Crazy	Vasil Gendov	
1918
Децата на балкана	Sons of the Balkans	Kevork Kuyumdjian	feature film
1919
Пристигането на българската делегация от конференцията в Париж	Pristiganeto na bulgarskata delegatziya ot konferentziuata v Parizh; Arrival of the Bulgarian Delegation from the Conference in Paris		

== 1920s ==
Title	Title (Latin) English	Director	Notes
1921
Дяволът в София	Dyavolat v Sofia; The Devil in Sofia	Vasil Gendov	
Лилиана	Liliana	Nikolai Larin and Dimiter Panchev	
Виновна ли е?	Vinovna li e? Is She to Blame?	Nikolai Larin	
1922
Бай Ганьо	Bay Ganyo	Vasil Gendov	
Момина скала	Momina skala Maiden's Rock	Nikolai Larin	
Под старото небе	Pod staroto nebe Under the Old Sky	Nikolai Larin	
Военни действия в мирно време	Voenni deystviya v mirno vreme Military Operations in Peacetime	Vasil Gendov	
1924
Чарли Чаплин на Витоша	Charli Chaplin na Vitosha; Charlie Chaplin on Mount Vitosha	Vasil Bakardzhiev	The director stars as Chalie Chaplain
1925
Атентатът в Света Неделя	Atentatat v Sveta Nedelya; Outrage in the Church Sveta Nedelya	Vasil Bakardzhiev	22 min documentary
Коварната принцеса Турандот	Kovarnata printzesa Turandot/Crafty Princess Turandot	Rayko Aleksiev	The director stars as Charlie Chaplain
1926
Курортен сън	Kurorten san A Holiday Dream		
1927
Човекът, който забрави Бога	Chovekat, koyto zabravi Boga; The Man Who Forsook God	Vasil Gendov	
В ноктите на порока	V noktite na poroka In the Clutches of Vice	Yohan Rozenblat	51 min feature film (drama)
1928
50 години от освобождението на град Плевен	50 godini ot osvobozhdenieto na grad Pleven; 50 Years from the Liberation of Pleven	Kiril Petrov	38 min documentary
В царството на розите	In the Realm of Roses	Alexander Vazov	documentary
Когато любовта говори	Kogato lyubovta govori When Love Speaks	Panayot Kenkov	28-min dramatic short
Любов и престъпление	Lyubov i prestaplenie Love and Crime	Georgi Ivanov; Nisim Koenson	55 min feature film (drama)
Пътят на безпътните	Patyat na bezpatnite In a Blind Alley	Vasil Gendov	
Сърцето на България (Мини 'Перник')	Sartzeto na Bulgariya (Mini 'Pernik')	Vassil Stoev	42 min documentary
Весела България	Vesela Bulgaria; Merry Bulgaria	Boris Grezhov	11 min
1929
Беловърха Витоша	Belovarha Vitosha; Snowcapped Mount Vitosha		feature film (drama)
Нащето море	Nasheto more Our sea	Kiril Petrov	14 min documentary
Най-вярната стража	Nay-vyarnata strazha The Most Loyal Guard	Vasil Poshev	
Пленникът от Трикери	Plennikat ot Trikeri	Mihail Slavov	
След пожара над Русия	Sled pozhara nad Rusiya; After the Fire Over Russia	Boris Grezhov	
Улични божества	Ulichni bozhestva Street Idols	Vasil Gendov	

== 1930s ==
Title	Title (Latin) English	Director	Notes
1930
Буря на младостта	Burya na mladostta Stormy Youth	Vasil Gendov	feature film (drama)
Моделът	Modelat; The Model	Vasil Poshev	
На тъмен кръстопът	Na tamen krastopat At a Dark Crossroads	Vasil Bakardzhiev	
Под орловото гнездо	Pod orlovoto gnezdo Under the Eagle's Nest	Petko Chirpanliev	
Земя	Zemya/Land	Peter Stojchev	
1931
Безкръстни гробове	Bezkrustni grobove Unmarked Graves	Vasil Gendov; Boris Grezhov	
Кражбата в експреса	Krazhbata v ekspresa Theft in the Express	Vasil Bakardzhiev	
1933
Бунтът на робите	Buntat na robite The Slaves' Revolt	Vasil Gendov	
Фамозният килим	Famozniyat kilim The Fabulous Carpet	Vasil Bakardzhiev	
1934
Димчо Дебелянов поетът - воин	Dimcho Debelyanov poetat-voin Dimcho Debelyanov: The Poet Soldier	Angel Temelkov-Anzhelo	
Песента на Балкана	Pesenta na Balkana; The Song of the Mountains	Peter Stojchev	
1935
Пред отечеството да забравим омразата си	Pred otechestvoto da zabravim omrazata si Let's Forget Our Animosity for Our Country's Sake	Vasil Bakardzhiev	
1937
Грамада	Gramada; Cairn	Alexander Vazov	
Птицеразвъдството в България	Ptizevadstvoto v Bulgaria	Minko Balkanski	
Земята гори	Zemyata gori The Earth Is on Fire	Vasil Gendov	
1938
Пожарна команда	Pozharna komanda	n/a	
Страхил войвода	Strahil voyvoda	Josip Novak	34 min feature film (short)
Врагове	Vragove/Rivals	Vasil Bakardzhiev	
1939
Настрадин Ходжа и Хитър Петър	Nastradin Hodzha i Hitar Petar; Nasredin Hodja and Sly Peter	Alexander Vazov	
Селското чудовище	Selskoto chudovishte The Village Monster	Vasil Bakardzhiev	

== 1940s ==
Title	Title (Latin) English	Director	Notes
1940
Избор на Царица на лъдженския плаж	Izbor na Tzaritza na Ladzhenskiya plazh A Choice for a Queen at the Ladzhen's Beach	Spas Totev	
Пийте само шуменско пиво	Piyte samo shumensko pivo Drink Only Shumen Ale	Spas Totev	
Те победиха	Te pobediha They Were Victorious	Boris Borozanov; Josip Novak	45 min feature film
За Родината	Za Rodinata; In the Name of the Motherland	Boris Grezhov	
1941
Български орли	Bulgarski orli Bulgarian Eagles	Boris Borozanov	69 min feature film
Любовта на семкаря	Lyubovta na semkarya The Love of the Peanut Vendor	Spas Totev	
Шушу-мушу	Shushu-mushu; Tittle-Tattle	Boris Grezhov	
1942
Изпитание	Izpitanie; Time of Trial	Hrisan Tzankov	91 min feature film
Стойне у костенурка	Stoyne u kostenurka Stoine in a Tortoise	Boris Borozanov	
1943
Ива самодива	Iva samodiva Iva the Nymph	Béla Lévay; Kiril Petrov	
Негово Величество Цар Борис Трети - обединител	Negovo velichestvo tsar Boris III - obedinitel His Majesty Czar Boris III - Integrator	Boris Borozanov	
Сватба	Svatba; The Wedding	Boris Borozanov	69 min feature film
1944
Българо-унгарска рапсодия	Bulgaro-ungarska rapsodiya A Bulgarian-Hungarian Rhapsody	Boris Borozanov; Frigyes Bán	
Росица	Rositza	Boris Borozanov	
1945
Българи от старо време	Bulgarian Old Times	Dimitar Minkov	71 min feature film
Ще дойдат нови дни	New days will come	Anton Marinovich	88 min feature film
1946
Борба за щастие	Struggle for Happiness	Ivan Fichev	67 min feature film (drama)
Мене ме, мамо, змей люби	Me Me, Mom, dragon love	Vasil Bakardjiev	65 min feature film
Огнена диря	Fire trail	Boris Borozanov, Atanas Georgiev	91 min feature film
1947
Бойка			
Изкупление	Atonement	Boris Grezhov	
Отново в живота	Back to Life	Georgi Bogoyavlenski	86 min feature film
1949
Той не умира	He Does Not Die	Boris Grezhov	83 min feature film
