= Konstantin Kotsev =

Bulgarian actor (1926–2007)

Konstantin Kotsev Константин Коцев
- Born: June 4, 1926; Istanbul, Turkey
- Died: August 4, 2007 (aged 81); Sofia, Bulgaria
- Occupations: Film and Theatre Actor
- Years active: 1958–2003

Konstantin Kotsev (Bulgarian: Константин Коцев; June 4, 1926 – August 4, 2007) was a Bulgarian stage and film actor.

Kotsev was amid the most popular Bulgarian actors from the last decades of 20th century. He is best known for his roles in classic Bulgarian films such as The Tied Up Balloon (1967), The Swedish Kings (1968), The white room (1968), Naked Conscience (1971), Toplo / Warmth (1978), Time of Violence (1988), as well as his numerous notable performances on the stage.

Konstantin Kotsev was decorated with the high titles “Honoured Artist” and “People's Artist”.

== Biography and career ==
Born Konstantin Vasilev Kotsev on June 4, 1926, in the city of Istanbul, he entered the law faculty at the St. Kliment Ohridski University of Sofia where he graduated in 1950. Subsequently, he enrolled acting at The National Academy for Theatre and Film Arts graduating in 1958.

After the graduation, Kotsev was appointed in the Burgas Theatre for a year. In 1959, he joined the troupe of the newly founded Satirical Theatre „Aleko Konstantinov“ in Sofia where he remained until 1984. During the end of the 1980s, Kotsev was part of the Municipal Theatre of Sofia.

His film debut in a main role was in 1958 in the Bulgarian film classic On a Small Island directed by Rangel Valchanov.

Kotsev has a son Dimitar (born 1971) and a daughter Zornitsa (born 1972).

== Partial filmography ==
| Year | Film | Role | Notes |
|---|---|---|---|
| 1958 | Na malkiya ostrov / On a Small Island | Zheko | Bulgarian: На малкия остров |
| 1960 | Parvi urok / First Lesson | the assistant | Bulgarian: Първи урок |
| 1963 | Inspektorat i noshtta / The Inspector and the Night | d-r Kolev | Bulgarian: Инспекторът и нощта |
| 1967 | Privarzaniyat balon / The Tied Up Balloon | peasant | Bulgarian: Привързаният балон |
| 1968 | Shvedskite krale / The Swedish Kings | Bozhko | Bulgarian: Шведските крале |
| 1968 | Sluchayat Penleve / The Penleve Case | Ivan Gandzhulov | Bulgarian: Случаят Пенлеве |
| 1968 | Byalata staya / The white room | Patriarch Ioakim | Bulgarian: Бялата стая |
| 1968 | Chovekat ot La Mancha / Man of La Mancha | | Bulgarian: Човекът от Ла Манча; TV musical |
| 1969 | Ptitzi i hratki / Birds and Greyhounds | public prosecutor | Bulgarian: Птици и хрътки |
| 1970 | Ezop / Aesop | the diviner | Bulgarian: Езоп |
| 1971 | Nyama nishto po-hubavo ot loshoto vreme / There Is Nothing Finer Than Bad Weather | Van Alten | Bulgarian: Няма нищо по-хубаво от лошото време |
| 1971 | Gola savest / Naked Conscience | Grozdan Panayotov | Bulgarian: Гола съвест |
| 1974 | Vetchni vremena / Eternal Times | Bosyo | Bulgarian: Вечни времена |
| 1978 | Toplo / Warmth | the pensioner Snegov | Bulgarian: Топло |
| 1980 | Noshtnite bdeniya na pop Vecherko / Priest Vecherko's Nights Wakefulness | Priest Vecherko | Bulgarian: Нощните бдения на поп Вечерко |
| 1983 | Ravnovesie / Balance | the film director | Bulgarian: Равновесие |
| 1984 | Gore na chereshata / On the Top of the Cherry Tree | Peshev | Bulgarian: Горе на черешата |
| 1988 | Vreme Razdelno / Time of Violence | old man Galushko (Karaibrahim's father) | Bulgarian: Време разделно |
