= Intuition Peak =

780m peak in the South Shetland Islands, Antarctica

Location of Tangra Mountains on Livingston Island in the South Shetland Islands

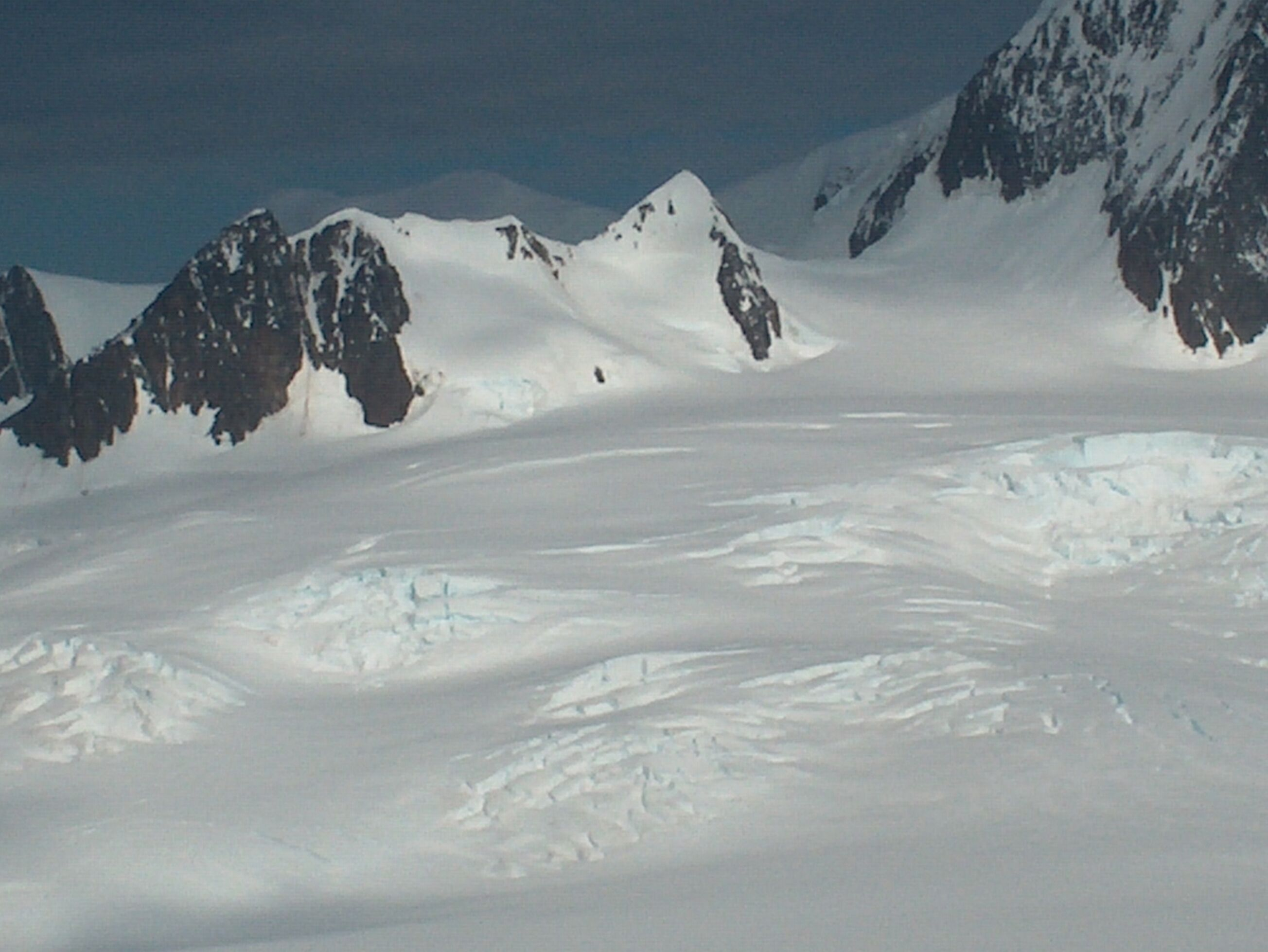
Intuition Peak from near Pirdop Gate

Topographic map of Livingston Island and Smith Island

Intuition Peak (Bulgarian: връх Интуиция, romanized: vrah Intuitsiya, IPA: [ˈvrɤx intuˈit͡sijɐ]) is a sharp Antarctic peak of elevation 780 m in Levski Ridge, Tangra Mountains on Livingston Island in the South Shetland Islands, Antarctica. It is surmounting Iskar Glacier to the east and Devnya Valley to the west. The peak was named in appreciation of the role of scientific intuition for the advancement of human knowledge.

== Location ==
The cliff is located at 62°38′38.8″S 60°02′07″W which is 1.39 km north by west of Helmet Peak, 5.25 km southeast of Atanasoff Nunatak and 630 m west-southwest of Radoy Ralin Peak (Bulgarian mapping in 2005 and 2009 from the Tangra 2004/05 topographic survey).

== Maps ==
- L. L. Ivanov et al. Antarctica: Livingston Island and Greenwich Island, South Shetland Islands. Scale 1:100000 topographic map. Sofia: Antarctic Place-names Commission of Bulgaria, 2005.
- L. L. Ivanov. Antarctica: Livingston Island and Greenwich, Robert, Snow and Smith Islands. Scale 1:120000 topographic map. Troyan: Manfred Wörner Foundation, 2009. ISBN 978-954-92032-6-4
- Antarctic Digital Database (ADD). Scale 1:250000 topographic map of Antarctica. Scientific Committee on Antarctic Research (SCAR). Since 1993, regularly upgraded and updated.
- L.L. Ivanov. Antarctica: Livingston Island and Smith Island. Scale 1:100000 topographic map. Manfred Wörner Foundation, 2017. ISBN 978-619-90008-3-0
- A. Kamburov and L. Ivanov. Bowles Ridge and Central Tangra Mountains: Livingston Island, Antarctica. Scale 1:25000 map. Sofia: Manfred Wörner Foundation, 2023. ISBN 978-619-90008-6-1
