= Judge and the Forest =

1975 film

- Directed by: Rangel Vulchanov
- Written by: Rangel Vulchanov
- Starring: Lyubomir Bachvarov
- Cinematography: Viktor Chichov
- Release date: 12 December 1975
- Running time: 102 minutes
- Country: Bulgaria
- Language: Bulgarian

Judge and the Forest (Bulgarian: Следователят и гората, translit. Sledovatelyat i gorata) is a 1975 Bulgarian drama film directed by Rangel Vulchanov. It was entered into the 26th Berlin International Film Festival.

== Cast ==
- Lyubomir Bachvarov as Sledovatelyat Nikolov
- Sonya Bozhkova as Elena
- Alexander Pritup as Mihaylov
- Georgi Kishkilov as Sledovatelyat Naydenov
- Penka Tsitselkova as student
- Tzvetana Golanova as S.N.Popova
- Georgi Rusev as Stoyan
- Dimitar Angelov as Prokopiev
- Dimiter Milushev as Bonev
- Emil Dzamdzijew as Mladezhat na garata
- Aneta Petrovska as interior ministry officer
