= We Were Young (film) =

1961 film by Binka Zhelyazkova

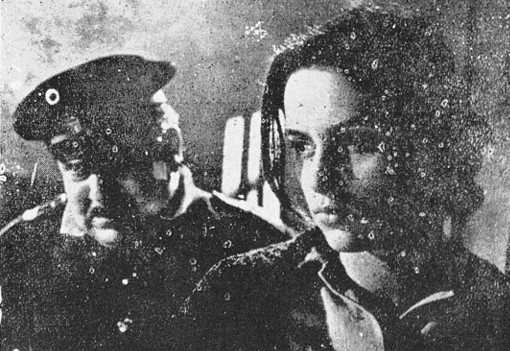
- A frame of the Bulgarian film "А бяхме млади"
- Directed by: Binka Zhelyazkova
- Written by: Hristo Ganev
- Produced by: Binka Zhelyazkova
- Starring: Dimitar Buynozov
- Cinematography: Vasil Holiolchev
- Music by: Simeon Pironkov
- Distributed by: Boyana Film
- Release date: 13 March 1961
- Running time: 110 minutes
- Country: Bulgaria
- Language: Bulgarian

We Were Young (Bulgarian: А бяхме млади, A byahme mladi) is a 1961 Bulgarian drama film directed by Binka Zhelyazkova and written by Hristo Ganev. The film is centered on the Bulgarian resistance to Nazism in Sofia during the Second World War.

== Cast ==
- Dimitar Buynozov as Dimo
- Rumyana Karabelova as Veska
- Lyudmila Cheshmedzhieva as Tzveta
- Georgi Georgiev-Getz as Mladen
- Emilia Radeva as Nadya
- Anani Yavashev as Slavcho
- Georgi Naumov
- Ivan Trifonov
- Dimitar Panov
- Ivan Bratanov
- Dora Stoyanova

== Release and acclaim ==
The film premiered on 13 March 1961 in Bulgaria. The film premiered in Russia in July 1962 at the 2nd Moscow International Film Festival and won the Golden Prize (1959–1967) for director Binka Zhelyazkova. Zhelyazkova was nominated as director of best picture at the Grand Prix Film Festival in 1961.

== Box office ==
A reported 2,303,354 admissions were recorded for the film in cinemas throughout Bulgaria.

== See also ==
- List of Bulgarian films
