= Women (1966 film) =

- Russian: Женщины
- Directed by: Pavel Lyubimov
- Written by: Budimir Metalnikov; Irina Velembovskaya
- Produced by: Vladimir Makarov
- Starring: Inna Makarova; Nina Sazonova; Nadezhda Fedosova; Galina Yatskina; Valentina Vladimirova; Irina Murzayeva
- Cinematography: Vasiliy Dultsev; Mark Osepyan
- Edited by: K. Malinskaya
- Music by: Yan Frenkel
- Production company: Gorky Film Studio
- Release date: 1966
- Running time: 106 min.
- Country: Soviet Union
- Language: Russian

Women (Russian: Женщины, romanized: Zhenshchiny) is a 1966 Soviet romantic drama film directed by Pavel Lyubimov. Based on the story of the same name by Irina Velembovskaya.

The film tells the story of three generations of women who navigate love, hardship, and resilience while working at a Soviet furniture factory, where personal struggles intertwine with societal expectations.

== Plot ==
The film tells the story of three generations of women working at a furniture factory, capturing their experiences with love, joy, and sorrow. It begins in the early 1950s, when Dusya Kuzina moves from her village to the city and meets Ekaterina Timofeevna Bednova, a widowed factory worker with a son. Ekaterina takes Dusya under her wing, offering her a place to stay and helping her secure a job at the factory. Dusya begins a relationship with Yuri, a well-known figure at the factory, but their romance ends tragically after a failed abortion leaves Dusya unable to have children.

Years later, a young woman named Alya (Alevtina) Yagodkina, from Dusya's village, hopes to leave with Viktor, a city boy visiting during his vacation. However, her mother insists they marry first. Viktor reluctantly agrees but disappears for two months, only to be rejected by Alya when he returns. After discovering she is pregnant, Alya gives birth to a son and struggles as a single mother. At her mother's urging, Alya moves to the city with Dusya's help to find work at the furniture factory, leaving her son behind in the village. Alya becomes an apprentice under Dusya, but Ekaterina Timofeevna, now the head of the factory’s trade union, discovers that Dusya is keeping Alya in an apprentice position longer than necessary and charging her for rent. Taking Alya under her protection, Ekaterina Timofeevna invites her to a New Year’s celebration, where Alya meets her son, Evgeny, a university student.

Alya and Evgeny begin a relationship, but Alya hides the fact that she has a child. When Ekaterina Timofeevna learns the truth, she opposes the relationship, believing her son should not marry a single mother. She reveals Alya's secret to Evgeny, but he refuses to end the relationship. While Evgeny is away on a work assignment, Ekaterina Timofeevna confronts Alya, who decides to leave the factory and return to her village. Dusya criticizes Ekaterina Timofeevna for her harshness, and the older woman realizes her mistake. Determined to make amends, she travels to the village, where she encounters Alya’s mother and her young son at a well, finally understanding the sacrifices and struggles Alya has faced.

== Cast ==
- Inna Makarova as Yevdokia Kuzina
- Nina Sazonova as Yekaterina Bednova
- Nadezhda Fedosova as Grusha
- Galina Yatskina as Alya Yagodkina
- Valentina Vladimirova as Liza
- Irina Murzaeva as elevator girl
- Irina Martemyanova as lady at the dance
- Lyusyena Ovchinnikova as Anna
- Viktor Mizin as Vityka
- Vitali Solomin as Zhenya Bednov
- Pyotr Lyubeshkin as Konstantin Ivanovich
- Ye. Mandrykin as episode
- Pyotr Polev as Dimitriy Polev
- Dmitri Popov as Yura
- Valeriy Rukin as Zhorka

== Release ==
One of the leaders of the Soviet film distribution in 1966 36.6 million people (6th place).
