= The Swimming Pool (1977 film) =

1977 film

- Directed by: Binka Zhelyazkova
- Written by: Hristo Ganev
- Produced by: Vesela Dimitrova
- Starring: Kosta Tsonev
- Cinematography: Ivaylo Trenchev
- Release dates: July 1977 (Moscow); 29 August 1977 (Bulgaria)
- Running time: 148 minutes
- Country: Bulgaria
- Language: Bulgarian

The Swimming Pool (Bulgarian: Басейнът, translit. Baseynat) is a 1977 Bulgarian drama film directed by Binka Zhelyazkova. It was entered into the 10th Moscow International Film Festival, where it won the Silver Prize.

== Plot ==
The film follows Bella, a young woman whose disillusionment with her surroundings becomes apparent at her school-leaving celebration. That night, she meets Apostol, an architect approaching forty, at a swimming pool. Despite the considerable age difference between them, Bella becomes attracted to his intelligence, social circle, way of life, and the respect he receives from those around him.

Apostol is dissatisfied with his professional life. Although he has pursued unconventional architectural ideas, his designs have repeatedly been rejected. His friend Boyan, an actor and comic impersonator, represents a contrasting personality. He is outwardly playful and surrounds himself with performers and theatrical figures, but privately feels insecure about his lack of genuine talent. The relationship between Bella, Apostol, and Boyan gradually develops into an uneasy mixture of friendship, affection, and romantic attachment.

Bella, who is more mature than her age might suggest, becomes increasingly troubled by what she sees as hypocrisy and indifference in the adults around her. She also has a difficult relationship with her mother, a television journalist whom Bella regards as superficial. Her growing dissatisfaction takes on a clearer direction when she learns about Apostol's involvement in the anti-fascist resistance in the past. By this point, Apostol has fallen in love with her.

Despite their connection, Bella eventually marries Boyan. Apostol, nevertheless, remains a significant figure in her life. The film uses the swimming pool as a recurring visual motif, with the pool serving both as the setting for important events and as a metaphor for human life.

== Cast ==
- Kosta Tsonev as Apostol
- Yanina Kasheva as Bella
- Kliment Denchev as Bufo
- Tzvetana Maneva as Dora
- Petar Slabakov
- Georgi Kaloyanchev
- Vassil Mihajlov
- Stefan Stefanov
- Olga Kircheva
