= Where Are You Going? =

1986 Bulgarian comedy film

- Directed by: Rangel Vulchanov
- Written by: Rangel Vulchanov; Georgi Danailov
- Starring: Stoyan Aleksiev
- Cinematography: Radoslav Spassov
- Edited by: Yordanka Bachvarova
- Release date: May 1986
- Running time: 93 minutes
- Country: Bulgaria
- Language: Bulgarian

Where Are You Going? (Bulgarian: За къде пътувате?, translit. Za kude putuvate) is a 1986 Bulgarian comedy film directed by Rangel Vulchanov. It was screened in the Un Certain Regard section the 1986 Cannes Film Festival and was entered into the main competition at the 15th Moscow International Film Festival. The film was selected as the Bulgarian entry for the Best Foreign Language Film at the 61st Academy Awards, but was not accepted as a nominee.

== Cast ==
- Stoyan Aleksiev as Dotzent Radev
- Georgi Kaloyanchev as Bay Denyo
- Katerina Evro as Katerina
- Iossif Surchadzhiev as Strezov
- Yordan Spirov as Uchitelyat
- Katerina Angelova
- Dimo Kolarov
- Stefan Ilyev
- Vasil Dimitrov

== See also ==
- List of submissions to the 61st Academy Awards for Best Foreign Language Film
- List of Bulgarian submissions for the Academy Award for Best Foreign Language Film
