= Zhana Gendova =

Bulgarian actress (1899–1976)

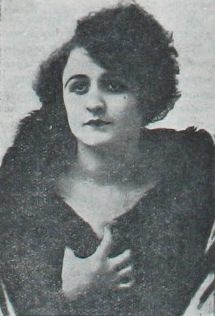
- A portrait picture of Zhana Gendova
- Born: Ivanka Ivanova; 22 December 1899; Sliven, Principality of Bulgaria
- Died: 14 February 1976 (aged 76); Sofia, Bulgaria
- Occupation(s): Actress, Bulgarian cinema pioneer, author
- Spouse: Vasil Gendov

Ivana Ivanova Gendova (Bulgarian: Ивана Иванова Гендова; 22 December 1899 – 14 February 1976), better known as Zhana Gendova (Bulgarian: Жана Гендова), was a Bulgarian actress. She was also the wife of the Bulgarian movie pioneer Vasil Gendov.

== Biography ==
Gendova was born in Sliven on 22 December 1899. She moved to Berlin and studied drama education. Later on, she participated in the drama courses and lessons of Sava Ognyanov and Elena Snezhina.

Her first debut was in 1917, a movie called Lyubovta e Ludost or in English Love Is Madness. She actively participated in most of Vasil Gendov's movies as an actress, producer and assistant director between 1917 and 1937.

From 1920 until 1938, Gendova and her husband Vasil Gendov created the travelling drama theatre "Bulgarian Theatre", in which they acted, and which was later renamed to Sensational Theatre. She was also the author of That, Which is Unspoken in the History of the Bulgarian film, a memoir book. Gendova also became a founding member of the Bulgarian Film Actors Union in 1934.

She is considered to be one of the pioneers of Bulgarian cinema.

== Major roles ==
=== Stage ===
Throughout her career, Zhana participated in many theater plays, with the most influential being:

- Salome in Salome by Oscar Wilde.
- Ophelia in Hamlet by William Shakespeare.
- Gervaise in L'Assommoir by Émile Zola
- Esmerelda in The Hunchback of Notre-Dame by Victor Hugo

=== Cinema ===
- Zemyata Gori (1937)
- Buntat na Robite (1933)
- Ulichni Bozhestva (1929)
- Patyat na Bezpatnite (1928)
- Chovekat, koyto zabravi boga (1927)
- Voenni deystviya v mirno vreme (1922)
- Voenni deystviya v mirno vreme (1922)
- Dyavolat v Sofia (1921)
- Lyubovta e Ludost (1917)
