= Something Out of Nothing (film) =

От нищо нещо Ot nishto neshto (Something Out of Nothing)
- New DVD cover
- Directed by: Nikola Rudarov
- Written by: Nikolay Nikiforov
- Starring: Asen Kisimov; Stefan Danailov; Aneta Sotirova
- Cinematography: Georgi Georgiev
- Music by: Boris Karadimchev
- Production companies: Bulgarian Cinematography; Studio of Featured Films (SFF); Film Unite Hemus
- Release date: 1979
- Running time: 93 minutes
- Country: Bulgaria
- Language: Bulgarian

Something Out of Nothing (Bulgarian: От нищо нещо, romanized: Ot nishto neshto) is a Bulgarian comedy film released in 1979, directed by Nikola Rudarov, starring Asen Kisimov, Stefan Danailov and Aneta Sotirova.

The movie tells the story how the prejudices of the people in the countryside can bring troubles just like that when two different lifestyles are faced to each other. The film shows the way of life of a Bulgarian family in the villages or the small towns from that time.

== Cast ==
- Asen Kisimov as the journalist (Pancho' class-fellow)
- Stefan Danailov as Pancho
- Aneta Sotirova as Pancho' wife
- Stefan Kostov
- Anna Pencheva
- Dimitar Panov
- Ivan Obretenov
- Ivan Savov
- Vesko Zehirev
