= Bogomil Raynov =

Bulgarian writer and professor (1919–2007)

Bogomil Nikolaev Raynov
- Born: 19 June 1919; Sofia, Kingdom of Bulgaria
- Died: 8 June 2007 (aged 87); Sofia, Bulgaria
- Education: Sofia University
- Occupation: Writer
- Awards: Hero of Socialist Labour (Bulgaria), Order of Georgi Dimitrov, Order of Saints Cyril and Methodius.

Bogomil Nikolaev Raynov (19 June 1919 – 8 June 2007) was a Bulgarian writer and professor of aesthetics.

== Biography ==
He was the son of the writer, philosopher and artist academician Nikolay Raynov and the brother of the sculptor Boyan Raynov. He took part in the Resistance Movement during the Second World War. He was a member of several Marxist circles. He became a member of the Bulgarian Communist Party in 1944.

He was the editor-in-chief of the Starling newspaper. For some time he was an associate professor at the Nikolai Pavlovich Higher Institute of Fine Arts.

From 1953 to 1960, he was cultural attaché at the Bulgarian Embassy in Paris, at which time he purchased various works of art exhibited at the National Art Gallery.

He was a member of the Central Committee of the Bulgarian Communist Party beginning in 1976. He was vice-chairman in 1967 and deputy chairman in 1972 of the Union of Bulgarian Communists, and also a corresponding Member of BAS since 1974.

Together with Svetlin Rusev he participated in the selection and purchase of paintings at the National Gallery for Foreign Art. The money was state-owned, granted at the insistence of Lyudmila Zhivkova.

== Creativity ==
He collaborated with the newspapers The Women's Gazette, Uchenicheski Rise, Svetlostruy, Literary Life, Literary Critic, Art and Criticism magazine, and others. His works were first published in 1936 in The Women's Gazette.

He made scientific publications in the fields of aesthetics, art history, and culturology. He was the author of numerous monographs on the fine arts, history of theosophy, and a series of crime and spy novels, whose main character is Emil Boev, as well as novelized autobiographies. His novels are very popular, published several times in large numbers.

In one of his later books, Ludmila, he gives information about the backstage in Bulgarian cultural and political life in the 1980s of the 20th century and the attempt to break the narrow-mindedness and open the door to the world of free culture.

After the death of Raynov, his books Our Light Finger and Letter from a Dead Man were published, filled with harsh attacks against Alexander Zhendov, Boris Delchev, and Radoy Ralin.

== Awards ==
- Honored Cultural Worker (1965).
- People's Cultural Worker (1971).
- Hero of Socialist Labor (1976).
- Order of Georgi Dimitrov (1952, 1969).
- St. Paisius of Hilendar prize (2006).

== Criticism ==
Bogomil Raynov is a highly controversial figure in Bulgarian culture. As a long-term deputy chairman of the Union of Bulgarian Writers and a member of the Central Committee of the Bulgarian Communist Party, he played a major role in imposing socialist realism in Bulgarian literature and in the ideological defeat of many "ideologically deluded" Bulgarian writers such as Alexander Zhendov, Hristo Radevski, Atanas Dalchev, and others, during the early years of communist rule until the fall of Valko Chervenkov, and later.

The famous Bulgarian literary critic Boris Delchev called Raynov "a scoundrel and high-class polemicist", "a cannibal", and "the right hand of the cult and its striking force, one of Zhendov's moral assassins" in his diary. The Bulgarian poet and translator Nevena Stefanova called him a "talented man". Radoy Ralin gave him the famous nickname "Guess Numerainov" (Bulgarian: Погодил Номерайнов).

== Selected works ==
=== Novels and short stories ===
- The Inspector and the Night (1963)
- Roads to Nowhere
- Inspector in the Dark (1967)
- Die as a last resort (1978)
- There's Nothing Better Than Bad Weather (1971)
- Mr. Nobody (1967, 1971, 1974)
- The Great Boredom (1971, 1974)
- Brazilian Melody
- A Middle-aged Naive (1975, 1976)
- Requiem for a Slut (1975, 1976)
- Typhoons with Gentle Names (1977)
- The Third Way (1977)
- Black Swans (1977)
- Only for Men ( 1977, 2003)
- The Day Doesn't Show in the Morning (1981)
- Don't Make Me Laugh (1983, 1989)
- The Quiet Corner (1999)
- Second Hand Cops ( 2000)
- The Colors of Pain (2004)
- The Secret (2005)
- Magic Lantern (2005)
- The Tobacco Man

=== Poetry collections ===
- Verses (1940)
- Poems (1941)
- Stalin (poem, 1944)
- Poems (1949)
- Verses (1962)
- Love calendar (1942)
- City Winds (selected verses, 1969)
- Steps on the sand. Verses 1936 - 1986 ”(1989)
- Cloudy, Verses (2002)

=== Essays ===
- Style in the Fine Arts (Introduction to Stylistics) (1948)
- Against the Art of Imperialism (1953)
- The Ways of Zionism (1969)
- Eros and Thanatos (1971)
- Portraits (1975)
- In the Name of the Father, Biography
- Production House, 2001
- Ludmila (2003)
- The Secret Doctrine (2003)
- Paris
