= The Big Night Bathe =

1980 film

- Directed by: Binka Zhelyazkova
- Written by: Hristo Ganev
- Produced by: Ivan Petkov
- Starring: Yanina Kasheva
- Cinematography: Plamen Vagenshtain
- Edited by: Madlena Dyakova
- Release date: 1 December 1980
- Running time: 144 minutes
- Country: Bulgaria
- Language: Bulgarian

The Big Night Bathe (Bulgarian: Голямото нощно къпане, translit. Golyamoto noshtno kapane) is a 1980 Bulgarian drama film directed by Binka Zhelyazkova. It was screened in the Un Certain Regard section at the 1981 Cannes Film Festival.

== Cast ==
- Yanina Kasheva - Ninel
- Małgorzata Braunek - Zana
- Tanya Shahova - Lora
- Lyuben Chatalov - Stoyan
- Ilia Karaivanov - Ivan
- Nikolai Sotirov - Sava
- Juozas Budraitis - Vili
