= The Pathfinder (1987 film) =

- Russian: Следопыт
- Directed by: Pavel Lyubimov
- Written by: James Fenimore Cooper; Pavel Lyubimov
- Starring: Yuri Avsharov; Andrejs Zagars; Anastasiya Nemolyaeva; Emmanuil Vitorgan; Andrey Mironov
- Cinematography: Anatoliy Grishko
- Music by: Yuriy Saulskiy
- Release date: 1987
- Running time: 91 minute
- Country: Soviet Union
- Language: Russian

The Pathfinder (Russian: Следопыт) is a 1987 Soviet adventure film directed by Pavel Lyubimov.

The film takes place during the English-French War of Dominance in North America. The film tells the story of a young girl Mabel Dungam, who goes to the English fort and meets officer Jasper and the pathfinder on the way.

== Plot ==
In 1758, during the height of the Seven Years' War, battles rage not only in Europe but also overseas, as England and France vie for control of the New World, enlisting Native American tribes in their struggles. French spy Marquis Sanglier persuades the Seneca to attack an English fort and seize its gunpowder supplies. According to his plan, the Seneca will kidnap Mabel, the daughter of Sergeant Dunham, distracting the soldiers with a search so the fort is left undefended. However, Dunham sends Pathfinder and Captain Jasper Western to meet Mabel, foiling the Seneca plot.

Mabel arrives safely at the fort, but the Native scout Arrowhead soon brings a message from Sanglier, revealing that the fort’s commander, Craggs, is a traitor. To further his scheme, Craggs convinces the troops to launch an attack against the Seneca, leaving the fort vulnerable. A shooting contest is held to boost morale, and Jasper Western wins, gifting his prize, a French hat, to Mabel. Arrowhead and June Dew stage Mabel's kidnapping, planning to sail a stolen boat to the Seneca and warn them of the unguarded fort.

In an attempt to outpace Arrowhead, part of the garrison marches out, leaving minimal defenses. When they reach the Seneca encampment, they find it deserted, while the remaining soldiers are overpowered at the fort, which falls to the Seneca. Mabel hides in a blockhouse, and Pathfinder returns to discover the fort overtaken. After signaling the English boat to return, Pathfinder helps reclaim the fort from the Seneca. With Craggs dead, Jasper confesses his love to Mabel, but she ultimately chooses Pathfinder.

== Cast ==
- Yuri Avsharov as Duncan
- Andrejs Zagars as Natt Bumppo (as Andris Zagars)
- Anastasiya Nemolyaeva as Mabel
- Emmanuil Vitorgan as Craig
- Andrey Mironov as Sanglis
- Aleksandr Glazun as Arrowhead
- Igor Rogachyov
- Georgiy Yumatov as Kan
- Sergei Kovalyov as Sandy
- Tatyana Augskap as Jenny
