= Asen Kisimov =

Bulgarian actor (1936–2005)

- Асен Кисимов
- Born: Asen Angelov Kisimov; 3 May 1936; Plovdiv, Bulgaria
- Died: 13 July 2005 (aged 69); Blagoevgrad, Bulgaria
- Occupations: Film and theatre actor Radio presenter
- Years active: 1955–2005

Asen Kisimov (Bulgarian: Асен Кисимов, also known as Asen Angelov (Bulgarian: Асен Ангелов), 3 May 1936 – 13 July 2005) was a Bulgarian stage and film actor, singer and radio presenter.

== Biography ==
He is best known for the famous songs which he sang for the soundtracks to the children's films The Hedgehogs' War (1979) and Vasko da Gama ot selo Rupcha (1986). Kisimov appeared in about 30 feature films between 1956 and 2000, most notably Be Happy, Ani! (1961), The Kindest Person I Know (1973), Something Out of Nothing (1979) and Monday Morning (1966, released 1988). He is also known for numerous stage performances as well as his radio program “An hour of the audience” which was broadcast by the Bulgarian National Radio for about 40 years. For his film, stage and audio works for the children, Kisimov was called Bate Asen.

== Selected filmography ==
Year	Film	Role	Notes
1961	Badi shtastliva, Ani! / Be Happy, Ani!	Zhivko	Bulgarian: Бъди щастлива, Ани!
1962	Pleneno yato / Captive Flock	Petar	Bulgarian: Пленено ято
1966	Ponedelnik sutrin / Monday Morning	Yordan	because of the communist censorship it was released in 1988; Bulgarian: Понеделник сутрин
1973	Nay - dobriyat chovek, kogoto poznavam / The Kindest Person I Know	Georgi Nedelchev	Bulgarian: Най-добрият човек, когото познавам
1976	Da izyadesh yabalkata / To Eat the Apple	the investigator Urumov	Bulgarian: Да изядеш ябълката
1977	Hora otdaleche / People from Afar	Iliev	Bulgarian: Хора отдалече
1979	Ot nishto neshto / Something Out of Nothing	the journalist	Bulgarian: От нищо нещо
1987	Eva na tretiya etazh / Eve on the Third Floor	Misho	Bulgarian: Ева на третия етаж
