= The Tied Up Balloon =

1967 Bulgarian satirical comedy-drama film

Привързаният балон Privarzaniyat balon (The Tied Up Balloon)
- Directed by: Binka Zhelyazkova
- Written by: Yordan Radichkov
- Starring: Georgi Partsalev; Grigor Vachkov; Georgi Kaloyanchev; Konstantin Kotsev; Georgi Georgiev-Getz
- Cinematography: Emil Vagenshtayn
- Music by: Simeon Pironkov
- Production companies: State Enterprice Studio of Featured Films (SFF), created 1962, Boyana district, Sofia
- Release date: 1967
- Running time: 98 minutes
- Country: Bulgaria
- Language: Bulgarian

The Tied Up Balloon (Bulgarian: Привързаният балон, romanized: Privarzaniyat balon) is a Bulgarian satirical comedy-drama film released in 1967, directed by Binka Zhelyazkova, starring Georgi Partsalev, Grigor Vachkov, Georgi Kaloyanchev, Konstantin Kotsev and Georgi Georgiev-Getz. The screenplay, written by Yordan Radichkov is based on his play Bustle.

During the Second World War, a barrage balloon appears out of nowhere in the sky above a Bulgarian village. This shakes the imagination of the peasants and causes endless speculations, assumptions and contentions.

Almost immediately after the premiere, the film was stopped by the communist authority because of the direct display of the actual reality in the Bulgarian villages as well as for the hints about the origin of many of the communist leaders. After the restoration of the democracy in 1990, the movie came into a broad view and was recognized as one of the masterpieces of the Bulgarian cinematography from that time. In 2021, the film was digitized and restored. The digitally restored version premiered on March 16, 2021 at the Lumiere Cinema in Sofia.

== Cast ==
- Grigor Vachkov as the man with the pistol
- Georgi Kaloyanchev as a peasant
- Georgi Partsalev as a peasant
- Konstantin Kotsev as a peasant
- Georgi Georgiev-Getz as a peasant
- Ivan Bratanov as a peasant
- Konstantin Kisimov as the blind man
- Lyubomir Dimitrov as a peasant
- Tsvyatko Nikolov as a peasant
- Petar Slabakov
- Vasil Popiliev
- Janet Miteva as the girl in white
- Stoyan Gadev
- Dosyo Dosev
- Ivan Obretenov
- Nikola Dadov
- Neycho Popov
- Stoyanka Mutafova
- Domna Ganeva
