= Dimitar Buynozov =

Bulgarian actor

- Born: 7 November 1935; Veliko Tarnovo, Bulgaria
- Died: 25 November 1995 (aged 60); Sofia, Bulgaria
- Occupation: Actor
- Years active: 1955–1988

Dimitar Buynozov (Bulgarian: Димитър Буйнозов, 7 November 1935 – 25 November 1995) was a Bulgarian actor. He appeared in 13 films between 1957 and 1991.

== Filmography ==
Year	Title	Role	Notes
1957	Taynata vecherya na sedmatzite	Nayden	
1961	We Were Young	Dimo	
1962	Captive Flock	Boris	
1964	13 dni	Vasko	
1971	Ne se obrashtay nazad	Rado	
1971	Otkradnatiyat vlak	Damyan	
1975	It's Raining on Santiago	Le chef de la garde	
1980	Vazdushniyat chovek	Iliya Dumanov	
1981	Mera spored mera	Gotze Delchev	
1987	Eva na tretiya etazh	Professor Naumov	
1988	Zhivotut si teche tiho...	Pavel	
1991	Dalí	Viscount	
1991	Bashtata na yaytzeto	Inzhener Norbe	
