= Radoy Ralin Peak =

Location of Tangra Mountains on Livingston Island in the South Shetland Islands.

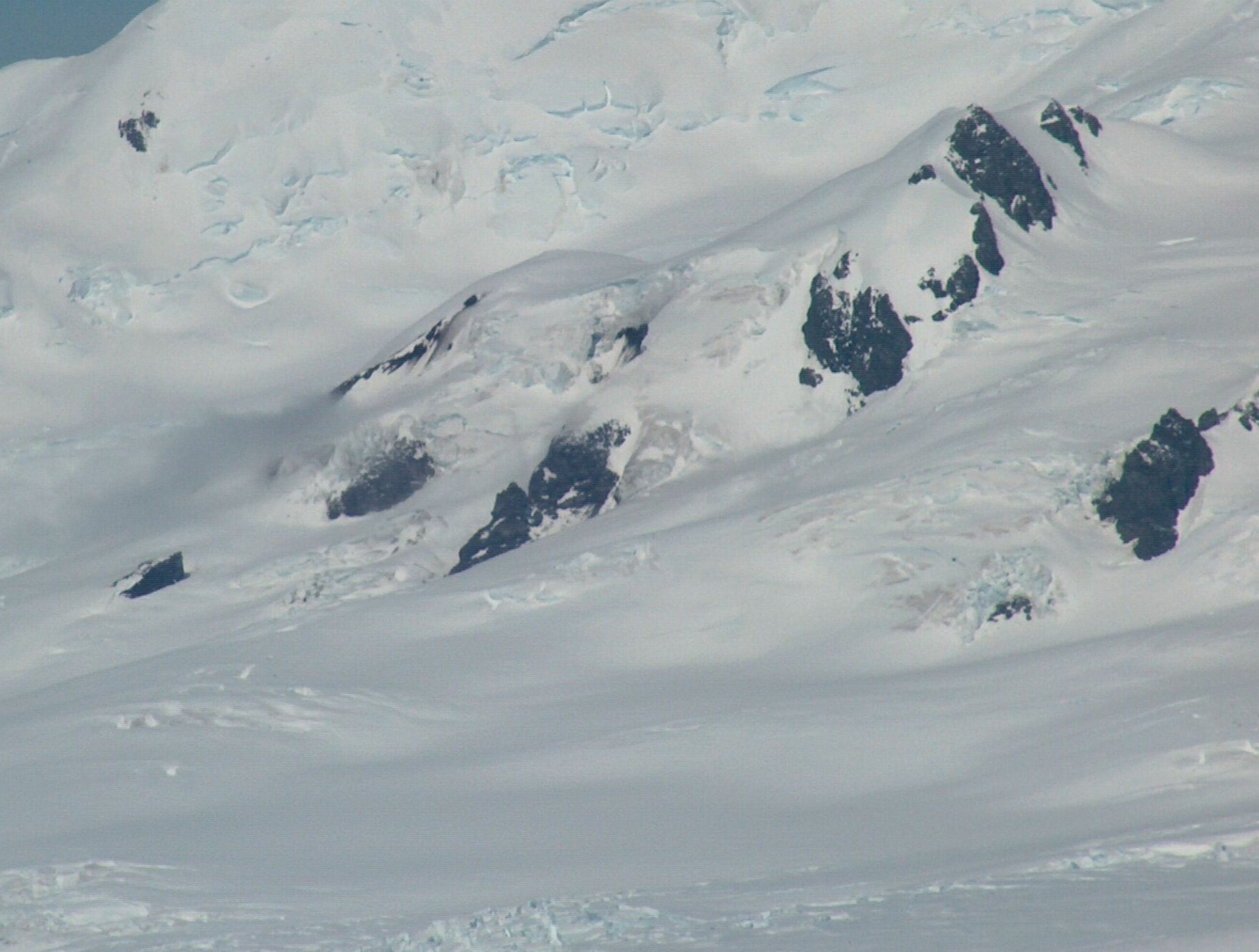
Radoy Ralin Peak from Zemen Knoll.

Topographic map of Livingston Island and Smith Island.

Radoy Ralin Peak (Bulgarian: връх Радой Ралин, romanized: vrah Radoy Ralin, IPA: [ˈvrɤx rɐˈdɔj ˈralin]) is a 720 m peak in the Levski Ridge in Tangra Mountains on Livingston Island in the South Shetland Islands, Antarctica surmounting Iskar Glacier to the east and the Huron Glacier terminus to the north-northwest. It was named after the Bulgarian writer Dimitar Stoyanov, who used Radoy Ralin as a pseudonym.

== Location ==
The peak's highest point is located at 62°38′33″S 60°01′25″W, which is 2.25 km south-southeast of Yana Point, 620 m east of Intuition Peak and Cherepish Ridge, 1.47 km north of Helmet Peak and 1.86 km northwest of Shishman Peak (Bulgarian topographic survey Tangra 2004/05, and mapping in 2005).

== Maps ==
- L.L. Ivanov et al. Antarctica: Livingston Island and Greenwich Island, South Shetland Islands. Scale 1:100000 topographic map. Sofia: Antarctic Place-names Commission of Bulgaria, 2005.
- L.L. Ivanov. Antarctica: Livingston Island and Greenwich, Robert, Snow and Smith Islands. Scale 1:120000 topographic map. Troyan: Manfred Wörner Foundation, 2009. ISBN 978-954-92032-6-4
- Antarctic Digital Database (ADD). Scale 1:250000 topographic map of Antarctica. Scientific Committee on Antarctic Research (SCAR). Since 1993, regularly upgraded and updated.
- L.L. Ivanov. Antarctica: Livingston Island and Smith Island. Scale 1:100000 topographic map. Manfred Wörner Foundation, 2017. ISBN 978-619-90008-3-0
- A. Kamburov and L. Ivanov. Bowles Ridge and Central Tangra Mountains: Livingston Island, Antarctica. Scale 1:25000 map. Sofia: Manfred Wörner Foundation, 2023. ISBN 978-619-90008-6-1
