= List of Bulgarian films of the 1990s =

A list of the most notable films produced in Bulgaria during the 1990s ordered by year of release. For an alphabetical list of articles on Bulgarian films see Category:Bulgarian films.

== List ==
=== 1990 ===
Title	Title (Latin) English	Director	Length	Cast	Notes

=== 1991 ===
Title	Title (Latin) English	Director	Length	Cast	Notes
The Well	Kladenetzat	Docho Bodzhakov			

=== 1992 ===
Title	Title (Latin) English	Director	Length	Cast	Notes

=== 1993 ===
Title	Title (Latin) English	Director	Length	Cast	Notes
Canary Season	Sezonat na kanarchetata	Evgeni Mihailov			

=== 1994 ===
Title	Title (Latin) English	Director	Length	Cast	Notes

=== 1995 ===
Title	Title (Latin) English	Director	Length	Cast	Notes
	Akropol; Acropolis	Pantelis Voulgaris	125 min	Lefteris Voyatzis, Stavros Paravas, Konstantinos Tzoumas, Themis Bazaka	

=== 1996 ===
Title	Title (Latin) English	Director	Length	Cast	Notes

=== 1997 ===
Title	Title (Latin) English	Director	Length	Cast	Notes

=== 1998 ===
Title	Title (Latin) English	Director	Length	Cast	Notes

=== 1999 ===
Title	Title (Latin) English	Director	Length	Cast	Notes
