= Georgi Cherkelov =

Bulgarian actor (1930–2012)

Georgi Cherkelov Георги Черкелов
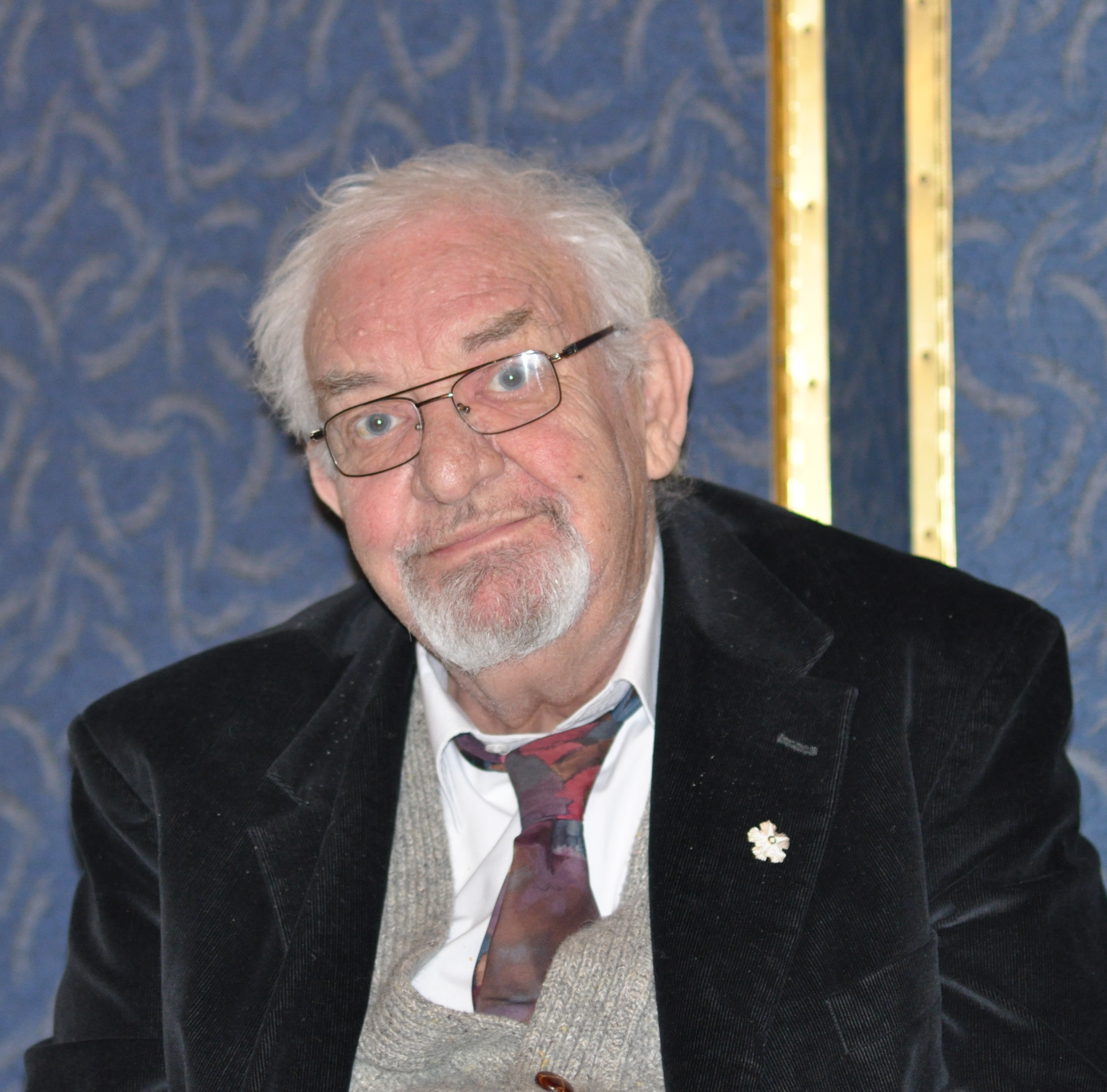
- Born: 25 June 1930; Haskovo, Bulgaria
- Died: 19 February 2012 (aged 81); Sofia, Bulgaria
- Occupations: Film and Theatre Actor
- Years active: 1956–2011

Georgi Cherkelov (Георги Черкелов); 25 June 1930 – 19 February 2012) was a Bulgarian stage and film actor. One of the most prominent names in the Bulgarian theater and cinema in the last decades. He became widely popular after the role of the anti-communist police inspector Velinski in the TV series At Every Kilometer (1969). Cherkelov appeared in many of the major Bulgarian film productions. He played the leading roles in Men on a business trip (1969), Toplo / Warmth (1978), Socrates (1981), The Judge (1986). He was also in many German and Italian film co-productions. He has directed the TV film "Last Stop – Berlin" (1983).

== Awards and public recognition ==
In 2001, Georgi Cherkelov was decorated with the highest government prize, the Order Of the Balkan Mountains, awarded to Bulgarian citizens with particularly great merit to Bulgaria. In 2009 he received the award Asker for lifetime achievement.

== Biography and career ==
Born as Georgi Ivanov Cherkelov on 25 June 1930, in the city of Haskovo, Bulgaria, he initially began studying law at the Sofia University, where he remained for three years before transferring to the National Academy for Theater and Film ВИТИЗ Кръстьо Сарафов where he graduated in 1956. Cherkelov started his stage career in the Vratsa theater. His film debut was in the 1961 film The Last Round. During the fifty years of his career, he has appeared in more than 100 roles on stage and in about 70 films. While continuing to perform on the stage of the National Theater Ivan Vazov where he has worked for decades, Cherkelov was also the artistic director of the Ivan Radoev Dramatic Theatre in Pleven (1985–1990).

Georgi Cherkelov was one a prominent Shakespearean actors in Bulgaria, with performances as King Lear, Richard II, Mercutio, Banco and many other major roles. He has played almost the entire repertoire of the British bard – a privilege many actors dream of, but only a few are given. Cherkelov's style was intelligent, with expressions based on subtle nuances, heavy pauses and solidly spoken phrases. His trademark were inborn dignity, loaded calm and presence – unique personal characteristics of this actor, which he infused into the characters he played.

In addition to being an extraordinary actor, Georgi Cherkelov has also staged a number of plays. Among the plays he directed are "One Flew Over the Cuckoo's Nest" (1982), "Wrestlers" (1981), "Huckleberry Finn" (1985), "Catcher in the Rye" (1998). Some of the adaptations for these plays he had written himself. In 2010 his book "Stories and emails" was published by Locus Publishing.

He died on 19 February 2012.

== Partial filmography ==
Year	Film	Role	Notes
1964	Невероятна История / Incredible Story	the editor in chief	Bulgarian: Невероятна история
1966	Цар и генерал / Tsar and general	General Karev	Bulgarian: Цар и генерал
1968	Бялата стая / The white room	Stoev	Bulgarian: Бялата стая
1968	Galileo Galilei / Galileo Galilei	GB	director Liliana Cavani
1969	Мъже в командировка / Men on a business trip	Bizhev	Bulgarian: Мъже в командировка
1969	На всеки километър / At Every Kilometer	Velinsky	Bulgarian: На всеки километър TV series
1970	Князът / The Prince	Patriarch Ioakim	Bulgarian: Князът
1975	Сватбите на Йоан Асен / The Weddings of King Ioan Assen	Vatatzi	Bulgarian: Сватбите на Йоан Асен
1978	Топло / Warmth	the academician	Bulgarian: Топло
1979	Черешова градина / The Cherry Orchard	Lambev	Bulgarian: Черешова градина
1981	Аспарух / Asparuh	Velizariy's father	Bulgarian: Аспарух
1982	Socrates / Сократ	Socrates	Bulgarian: Сократ
1986	Съдията / The Judge	Judge Andrey Dimov	Bulgarian: Съдията
2011	Operation Shmenti Capelli |Операция Шменти Капели	the voice	Bulgarian: Операция Шменти Капели
