= Captive Flock =

1962 film

- Directed by: Ducho Mundrov
- Written by: Emil Manov
- Starring: Dimitar Buynozov
- Cinematography: Georgi Alurkov
- Release date: 3 September 1962
- Running time: 91 minutes
- Country: Bulgaria
- Language: Bulgarian

Captive Flock (Bulgarian: Пленено ято, translit. Pleneno yato) is a 1962 Bulgarian drama film directed by Ducho Mundrov. It was entered into the 1962 Cannes Film Festival.

== Cast ==
- Dimitar Buynozov - Boris
- Stefan Ilyev - Vladimir
- Asen Kisimov - Petar
- Kiril Kovachev - Hristo
- Peter Slabakov - Anton
- Atanas Velikov - Vasil
- Lili Raynova
- Nadezhda Vakavchieva
- Bozhidar Dyakov
- Magda Kolchakova
- Simeon Yotov
- Kina Dasheva
- Mitko Videnov
- Rositza Slavcheva
