= First Lesson =

1960 film

- Directed by: Rangel Vulchanov; Vladimir Petrov
- Written by: Valeri Petrov
- Starring: Korneliya Bozhanova
- Cinematography: Dimo Kolarov
- Release date: 18 April 1960
- Running time: 98 minutes
- Country: Bulgaria
- Language: Bulgarian

First Lesson (Bulgarian: Първи урок, translit. Parvi urok) is a 1960 Bulgarian drama film directed by Rangel Vulchanov and starring Korneliya Bozhanova. It was entered into the 1960 Cannes Film Festival.

== Cast ==
- Korneliya Bozhanova as Violeta
- Georgi Naumov as Pesho
- Georgi Georgiev-Getz as Bratat na Pesho
- Georgi Kaloyanchev as Vaskata
- Konstantin Kotsev as Assistant
