= Binka Zhelyazkova =

Bulgarian film director

- Born: 15 July 1923; Svilengrad, Bulgaria
- Died: 31 July 2011 (aged 88); Sofia, Bulgaria
- Occupation: Film director
- Years active: 1958–1990

Binka Zhelyazkova (Bulgarian: Бинка Желязкова, 15 July 1923 – 31 July 2011), was a Bulgarian film director who made films between the late 1950s and the 1990s. She was the first Bulgarian woman to direct a feature film and one of the few women worldwide to direct feature films in the 1950s.

== Career ==
Zhelyazkova graduated from the Sofia Theatre Institute in 1956 and briefly worked as an assistant director at Sofia Film Studios "Boyana" before directing her first feature, Life Flows Quietly By... (1957). This film established the collaboration with her husband, screenwriter Hristo Ganev, with whom she worked on many of her films. The film explored the lives of the former partisan fighters now in positions of power and was critical of the communist régime in Bulgaria. The leadership of the Bulgarian Communist Party reacted with fury and for 30 years banned the film by Party decree. This marked the beginning of Binka Zhelyazkova's complex relationship with the régime.

During her career Zhelyakzova directed seven feature and two documentary films. An active member of the anti-fascist youth movement during World War II, she soon became disillusioned with the post-war realities, which had little to do with her ideals. Her work often reflected her struggles, and four of her nine films were banned from distribution and reached audiences only after the end of the regime. Particularly damaging for her career was the fate of The Tied Up Balloon, an innovative and highly stylized film, which showed the power of Binka's imagination and her potential as a film director. After its success at the 1967 Expo in Montreal the film was seen as an insult to the party leader, when in one of the scenes a group of villagers lift a donkey in the air. Again the communist party issued a decree and stopped the film. The same fate met the two documentary films Lullaby (1981) and The Bright and Dark Side of Things" (1981), about women in prison, a rear and uncompromising look at women's treatment in the socialist society, which were never released to the public.

Despite her difficulties at home her films won numerous awards outside of Bulgaria. We Were Young (1961) was awarded the Golden Prize at the 2nd Moscow International Film Festival in 1962. The Attached Balloon (1967) had a successful run at the 1967 Expo in Montreal. The Last Word (1974) for which she also wrote the screenplay was in competition at the 1974 Cannes Film Festival along with films by Pier Paolo Pasolini, Rainer Werner Fassbinder, Karlos Saura, Ken Russell and Liliana Cavani. Her 1977 film The Swimming Pool was entered into the 10th Moscow International Film Festival where it won the Silver Prize.

In the 1980s Binka Zhelyazkova became the director of the Bulgarian section of Women in Film, an organization created in 1989 after the international women in film conference, KIWI, in Tbilisi, Georgia. She stopped making films after 1989, which coincided with the fall of the communist regime in Bulgaria. For some time after that she remained active in the Women in Film organization, but soon completely withdrew from public life.

Since 2007 renewed interest has arisen in Zhelyazkova's work mainly due to the documentary Binka: To Tell a Story About Silence by the New York based Bulgarian film maker Elka Nikolova.

== Style ==
Binka Zhelyazkova's style was influenced by Italian Neo-Realism and the French New Wave, as well as by Russian cinema. The poetic and metaphoric imagery of her films often prompted critics to compare her to Federico Fellini and Andrey Tarkovski. Her distinctive directorial style along with her perfectionism and nonconformism won her the label "the bad girl of Bulgarian cinema". Despite the many interruptions, her work always reflected what was going on in the world at the time: the personality cult and the Hungarian uprising of 1956, the war in Vietnam and the waves of protests that swept many countries in the 1960s, the feminist movement in the 1970s and the 1980, and the stagnation of the last years of socialism.

== Feature films as director ==
- Life Flows Quietly By... (1957), released in 1988
- We Were Young (1961)
- The Tied Up Balloon (1967)
- The Last Word (1973)
- The Swimming Pool (1977)
- The Big Night Bathe (1980)
- On The Roofs at Night (1988), TV
- Lullaby (1981), documentary film
- The Bright and the Dark Side of Things (1981), documentary film

== Notes ==
- Nina Hibbin, Eastern Europe: Screen Series, Zwemmer Barnes (1969)
- Mira and Antonin J. Liehm, The Most Important Art: Soviet and Eastern European Cinema After 1945, University of California Press (1977)
- Ronald Holloway, The Bulgarian Cinema, Fairleigh Dickinson University Press (1986)
- Dina Iordanova, Cinema of Flames: Balkan Film, Culture, and the Media, British Film Institute (2008)
