= Mihail Mihaylov =

Bulgarian footballer

Personal information
- Date of birth: 4 March 1973 (age 53)
- Place of birth: Sofia, Bulgaria
- Height: 1.76 m (5 ft 9 in)
- Position: Striker

Senior career*
Years	Team	Apps	(Gls)
1991–1992	Levski Sofia	1	(0)
1992–1993	Sliven	18	(3)
1993–1994	Slavia Sofia	21	(5)
1994–2000	Velbazhd Kyustendil	140	(64)
2000–2001	SSV Ulm 1846	5	(0)
2001–2002	Lokomotiv Plovdiv	10	(1)
2002–2003	Velbazhd Kyustendil	30	(21)

International career
	Bulgaria	2	(0)
- * Club domestic league appearances and goals

Mihail Mihaylov (Bulgarian: Михаил Михайлов) (born 4 March 1973) is a Bulgarian former football midfielder who played several seasons for PFC Velbazhd Kyustendil. He also had a brief stint in Germany for SSV Ulm 1846.

Mihaylov was the leading scorer in the league during the Bulgarian A Liga's 1999–2000 season, scoring 20 goals for Velbazhd.
