= Georgi Kaloyanchev =

Bulgarian actor (1925–2012)

- Георги Калоянчев
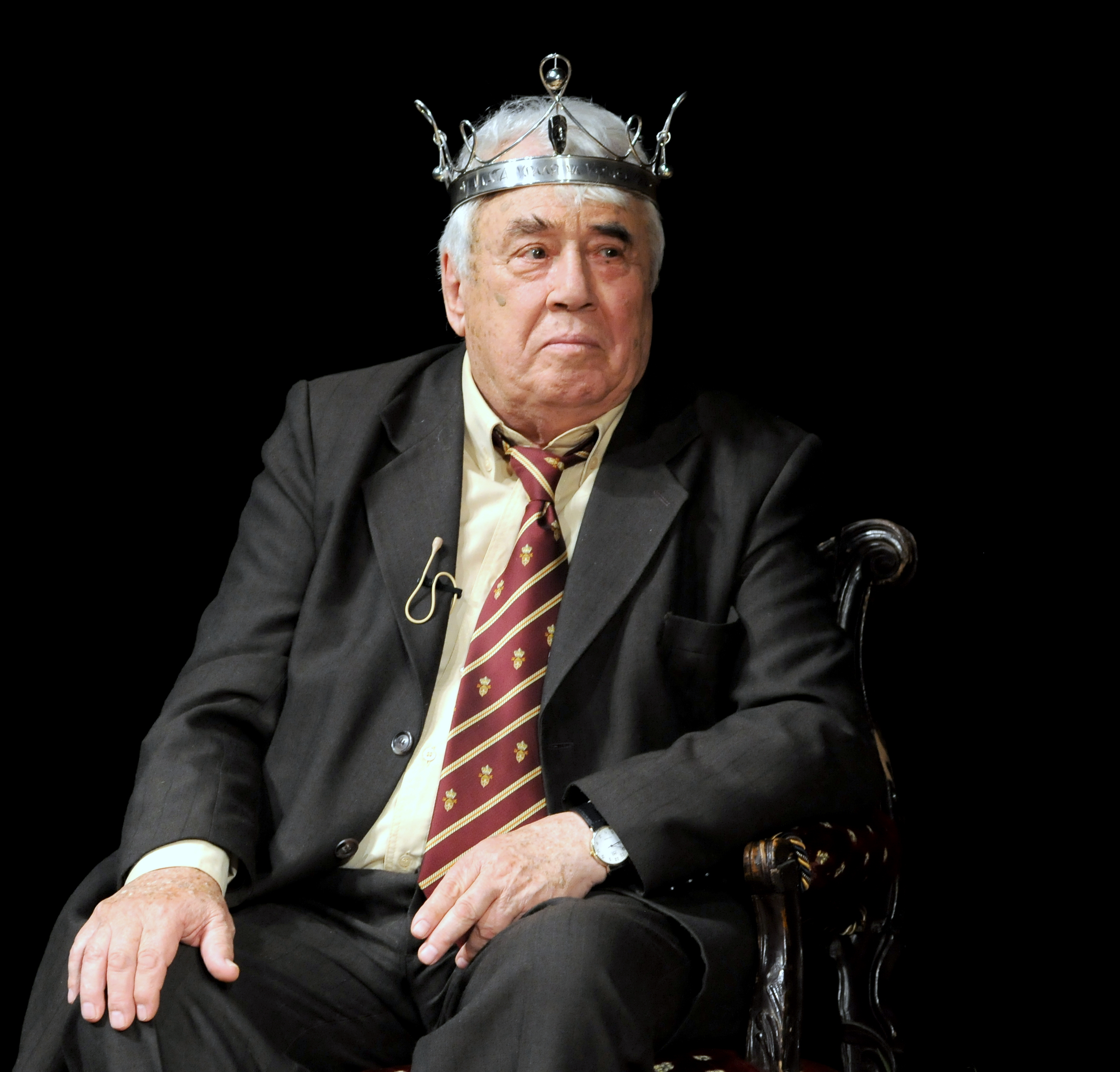
- Georgi Kaloyanchev (2008)
- Born: 13 January 1925; Burgas, Bulgaria
- Died: December 18, 2012 (aged 87); Sofia, Bulgaria

Georgi Todorov Kaloyanchev (Bulgarian: Георги Калоянчев; 13 January 1925 – 18 December 2012) was a Bulgarian actor.

== Biography ==
He was born in the city of Burgas. He studied in the former theatrical school in Sofia. Immediately after graduating he started playing in the Ivan Vazov National Theatre. His first role was in the movie Utro nad rodinata (1951) where he stars as the Gypsy Sali.

== Filmography ==
- Utro nad Rodinata (1951) as Sali
  - (in Bulgarian: Утро над Родината)
    (in English: Dawn Over the Homeland)
- Nasha zemya (1952) as Petko Shiloto
  - (in Bulgarian: Наша земя)
    (in English: Our Land)
- Snaha (1954)
  - (in Bulgarian: Снаха)
    (in English: Daughter-In-Law)
- Dimitrovgradtsy (1956) as Shteriu Barabata
  - (in Bulgarian: Димитровградци)
    (in English: People of Dimitrovgrad)
- Rebro Adamovo' (1956) as Miner
  - (in Bulgarian: Ребро Адамово)
    (in English: Adam's Rib)
- Item One (1956)
  - (in Bulgarian: Точка първа)
- Dve pobedi (1956)
  - (in Bulgarian: Две победи)
    (in English: Two Victories)
- A Lesson in History (1957) as Van der Lyube
  - (in Bulgarian: Урокът на историята)
- Godini za lyubov (1957)
  - (in Bulgarian: Години за любов)
    (in English: Years of Love)
- Lyubimetz 13 (1958)
  - (in Bulgarian: Любимец 13)
    (in English: Favourite 13)
- Malkata (1959) as Mircho
  - (in Bulgarian: Малката)
    (in English: The Little Girl)
- First Lesson (1960) as Vaskata
  - (in Bulgarian: Първи урок)
- Dvama pod nebeto (1960)
  - (in English: Two Under the Sky)
- Spetzialist po vsichko (1962) as Spiro
  - (in Bulgarian: Специалист по всичко)
    (in English: Jack-of-All-Trades)
- Tobacco (1962)
  - (in Bulgarian: Тютюн)
- Zlatniyat zab (1962) as Miliya
  - (in Bulgarian: Златният зъб)
    (in English: The Golden Tooth)
- Inspektorat i noshtta' (1963) as The Inspector
  - (in Bulgarian: Инспекторът и нощта)
    (in English: The Inspector and the Night)
- Neveroyatna istoriya (1964) as Fire department Chief
  - (in Bulgarian: Невероятна история)
    (in English: Incredible Story
- Rusiyat i Gugutkata (1965) as the Turtle-dove
  - (in Bulgarian: Русият и Гугутката)
    (in English: The Blonde and the Turtle-Dove)
- Valchitsata (1965) as Kondov
  - (in Bulgarian: Вълчицата)
    (in English: The She-Wolf)
- Dzhesi Dzeyms sreshtu Lokum Shekerov (1966) as Jesse James
  - (in Bulgarian: Джеси Джеймс срещу Локум Шекеров)
    (in English: Jesse James vs. Lokum Shekerov)
- Nay-dalgata nosht (1967) as Juggler
  - (in Bulgarian: Най-дългата нощ)
    (in English: The Longest Night)
- The Tied Up Balloon (1967) as Peasant
  - (in Bulgarian: Привързаният балон)
- Galileo (1968) as Giordano Bruno
  - (in Bulgarian: Галилео Галилей)
    (in English: Galileo Galilei)
- Byalata staya (1968) as Clown
  - (in Bulgarian: Бялата стая)
    (in English: The White Room)
- Nebeto na Veleka (1968) as Lazar
  - (in Bulgarian: Небето на Велека)
    (in English: The Sky Over the Veleka)
- Whale (1970) as Parushev
  - (in Bulgarian: Кит)
    (in English: Whale)
- Ezop (1970) as Aesop
  - (in Bulgarian: Езоп)
    (in English: Aesop)
- Demonat na imperiyata (1971, TV Series) as Ibrahim aga
  - (in Bulgarian: Демонът на империята)
    (in English: The Demon of the Empire)
- Otkradnatiyat vlak (1971) as colonel Tushev
  - (in Bulgarian: Откраднатият влак)
    (in English: The Stolen Train)
- Wrathful Journey (1971) as Chavdar's Father
  - (in Bulgarian: Гневно пътуване)
- Igrek 17 (1973) as the Grandfather
  - (in Bulgarian: Игрек 17)
    (in English: Y-17)
- Byagstvo v Ropotamo (1973) as Bay Manol
  - (in Bulgarian: Бягство в Ропотамо)
    (in English: Flight to the Ropotamo)
- Vechni vremena (1974)
  - (in Bulgarian: Вечни времена)
    (in English: Eternal Times)
- Na zhivot i smart (1974, TV Movie)
  - (in Bulgarian: На живот и смърт)
    (in English: Life or Death)
- Krivorazbranata tsivilizatsiya (1974, TV Movie)
  - (in Bulgarian: Криворазбраната цивилизация)
    (in English: The Phoney Civilization)
- Nako, Dako i Tsako: Moryatsi (1974) as Nako
- Momicheto s harmonichkata (1976) as Dzhambazina
  - (in Bulgarian: Момичето с хармоничката)
    (in English: The Girl with the Harmonica)
- Lebed (1976) as Stoyanov
  - (in Bulgarian: Лебед)
    (in English: Swan)
- Baseynat (1977)
  - (in Bulgarian: Басейнът)
    (in English: The Swimming Pool)
- Royalat (1979) as Zabcheto
  - (in Bulgarian: Роялът)
    (in English: Grand Piano)
- Byagay... Obicham te (1979) as Kalata
  - (in Bulgarian: Бягай... Обичам те)
    (in English: Run Away... I Love You)
- Kashtata (1979)
  - (in Bulgarian: Къщата)
    (in English: The House)
- Noshtnite bdeniya na pop Vecherko (1980) as Mayor
  - (in Bulgarian: Нощните бдения на поп Вечерко)
    (in English: Priest Vecherko's Nights Wakefulness)
- Byala magiya (1982) as God
  - (in Bulgarian: Бяла магия)
    (in English: White Magic)
- Bon shans, inspektore! (1983) as the Mayor
  - (in Bulgarian: Бон шанс, инспекторе!)
    (in English: Bonne Chance, Inspector!)
- Falshifikatorat ot "Cherniya kos" (1983, TV Series)
  - (Bulgarian: Фалшификаторът от `Черния кос`)
    (in English: The Blackbird Forger)
- Otkoga te chakam (1984) as Bank Cashier
  - (in Bulgarian: Откога те чакам)
    (in English: It's Nice to See You)
- Yan Bibiyan (1985) as the Priest
  - (in Bulgarian: Ян Бибиян)
    (in English: Yan Bibiyan)
- Harakteristika (1985) as Bay Luko
  - (in Bulgarian: Характеристика)
    (in English: Reference)
- Eshelonite' (1986) as Hlebaryat
  - (in Bulgarian: Ешелоните на смъртта)
    (in English: Transports of Death)
- Za kude putuvate (1986) as Bay Denyo
  - (in Bulgarian: За къде пътувате)
    (in English: Where Are You Going?)
- Samo ti, sartze (1987) as Head Doctor, Vasil
  - (in Bulgarian: Само ти, сърце;)
    (in English: Only You, My Heart)
- Vreme za pat (1987, TV Series) as Konstantin Vanchilov
  - (in Bulgarian: Време за път)
    (in English: Time for Traveling)
- Dom za nashite deca (1987, TV Series) as Konstantin Vanchilov
  - (in Bulgarian: Дом за нашите деца)
    (in English: Home for Our Children)
- Noshtem po pokrivite (1988, TV Movie)
  - (in Bulgarian: Нощем по покривите)
    (in English: On the Roofs at Night)
- Izlozhenie (1988) as Bay Miho
  - (in Bulgarian: Изложение)
    (in English: Report)
- Zaplahata (1989) as the Old man
  - (in Bulgarian: Заплахата)
    (in English: The Threat)
- Brachni shegi (1989) as Reader Stefan Stefanov
  - (in Bulgarian: Брачни шеги)
    (in English: Marital Jokes)
- Masmediologija na Balkanu (1989) as Profesor Reiser
- Karnavalat (1990) as Carnaval manager
  - (in Bulgarian: Карнавалът)
    (in English: The Carnival)
- Balkanska perestrojka (1990, TV Movie) as Dr. Rajser
- Bai Ganio (1990) as Ganio Balkansky
  - (in Bulgarian: Бай Ганьо)
    (in English: Bai Ganio)
- Pod igoto (1990, TV Series) as Hadzhi Smion
  - (in Bulgarian: Под игото)
    (in English: Under the Yoke)
- Bai Ganio tragva iz Evropa (1991) as Bai Ganio
  - (in Bulgarian: Бай Ганьо тръгва из Европа)
    (in English: Bai Ganyo on His Way to Europe)
- Pantudi (1993)
  - (in Bulgarian: Пантуди)
    (in English: Pantudi)
- Fatalna nezhnost (1993)
  - (in Bulgarian: Фатална нежност)
    (in English: Fatal Tenderness)
- Urnebesna tragedija (1994) as Taxi Driver
  - (in French: Tragédie burlesque)
- Sled kraja na sveta (1998) as Father Isiah
  - (in Bulgarian: След края на Света)
    (in English: After the End of the World)
    (in Greek: Meta to telos tou kosmou)
    (in German: Nach dem Ende der Welt)
- Golemite igri (1999) as Mr. Spiridonov
  - (in Bulgarian: Големите игри)
    (in English: The Big Games)
- Rapsodiya v byalo (2002) as Old man
  - (in Bulgarian: Рапсодия в бяло)
    (in English: Rhapsody in White)
