= The Swedish Kings =

1968 film by Lyudmil Kirkov

Шведските крале Shvedskite krale (The Swedish Kings)
- Directed by: Lyudmil Kirkov
- Written by: Nikolay Nikiforov
- Starring: Kiril Gospodinov; Tsvetana Maneva; Asen Georgiev; Evstati Stratev; Konstantin Kotsev
- Cinematography: Atanas Tasev
- Music by: Boris Karadimchev
- Production companies: Studio of Featured Films (SFF), Sofia
- Release date: 1968
- Running time: 89 minutes
- Country: Bulgaria
- Language: Bulgarian

The Swedish Kings (Bulgarian: Шведските крале, romanized: Shvedskite krale) is a Bulgarian comedy film released in 1968, directed by Lyudmil Kirkov, starring Kiril Gospodinov, Tsvetana Maneva, Asen Georgiev, Evstati Stratev and Konstantin Kotsev.

The construction worker Spas decides to go to a holiday at a luxurious seaside resort where he can amuse himself as a Swedish king. Soon he realizes that he is a stranger in this world of modern hotels and flashy night clubs full of snobs and insincere people.

The Swedish Kings is the first hit movie in the career of Lyudmil Kirkov. It became one of the classic works of the Bulgarian cinematography from the 1960s.

== Cast ==
- Kiril Gospodinov as Spas
- Asen Georgiev as Blago
- Tsvetana Maneva as Blago's wife
- Evstati Stratev as Goran
- Konstantin Kotsev as Bozhko
- Hindo Kasimov as a taxi driver
- Dolya Popova as Goran's wife
- Gerasim Mladenov as a check-taker
- Yoana Popova as Kalinka
- Nikola Rudarov
- Radoslav Stoilov
- Mihail Botevski
- Stefan Mavrodiev
- Dimitar Bochev
