= Ezop =

- Directed by: Rangel Valchanov
- Written by: Angel Vagenshtain
- Starring: Josef Kemr; Davzad Twast-Kafka; Georgi Kaloyanchev; Dorotea Toncheva; Stoyanka Mutafova
- Cinematography: Andrej Barla
- Edited by: Evgeniya Radeva
- Music by: Zdenek Liska
- Production companies: Boyana Film; Barrandov Studios
- Release date: 1969
- Countries: Bulgaria; Czechoslovakia
- Language: Bulgarian

Ezop is a 1969 Bulgarian-Czechoslovak film directed by Rangel Valchanov. The film starred Josef Kemr and Davzad Twast-Kafka. It was a minor success upon release, with the film's repeated line 'to help me' becoming symbolic of Prague in the early 1970s.
