= Pavel Lyubimov =

Pavel Grigoryevich Lyubimov (7 September 1938 – 23 June 2010) was a Russian film director and screenwriter.

== Biography ==
In 1962, he graduated from the directing department of the State Institute of Cinematography (Studios Roshal and Hanicke). In 1964 he began working at Gorky Film Studio. In 1964 his thesis film Aunt with Violets was awarded a festival prize in Kraków. He was awarded a Silver Dovzhenko Medal for his directing of the film Spring Appeal, with Alexander Fatyushin and Igor Kostolevsky in the leading roles. Creatively Lyubimov had an inherent interest in contemporary issues hidden in everyday life. Women and Spring Appeal are among his most admired films. He was named a Meritorious Artist of the Russian Federation in (2000).

He died on 23 June 2010.

== Selected filmography ==
- Aunt with Violets (1963, thesis film)
- Women (1966)
- Running on Waves (1967)
- Spring Appeal (1977)
- School Waltz (1978)
- The Pathfinder (1978)
