= Sava Hashamov =

Bulgarian actor (1940–2012)

- Born: 4 March 1940; Pleven, Bulgaria
- Died: 11 January 2012 (aged 71); Sofia, Bulgaria
- Occupation: Actor
- Years active: 1963–2007

Sava Kirilov Hashamov (Bulgarian: Сава Кирилов Хашъмов; 1940–2012) was a Bulgarian actor of theater and cinema. His recognition awards included the Honored Artist of the People's Republic of Bulgaria (1976) and People's Artist of the People's Republic of Bulgaria (1984).

== Biography ==
He was born in Pleven.

In 1963 he graduated from the Higher Institute of Theater Arts in Sofia.

In 1963–1964 he worked in the Burgas Theater. Since 1964 he worked at the Ivan Vazov National Theatre in Sofia. For 43 seasons he played more than 100 roles (including the role of Hamlet, numerous roles in the plays of Russian and Soviet classics). Got famous as a movie actor.

In Russia and the USSR he was known as the performer of one of the main roles in the film Running on the Waves (Thomas Garvey). In 1986 he was awarded as the best actor for the role of Repetilov in Griboedov's Woe from Wit.

In 1977–1989, he was Secretary of the Union of Bulgarian Artists.

He was married to Soviet and Russian actress Margarita Terekhova. Hashamov was the father of four children, he had two grandchildren.
