= Vasil Gendov =

Bulgarian actor, film director and screenwriter (1891–1970)

- Васил Гендов
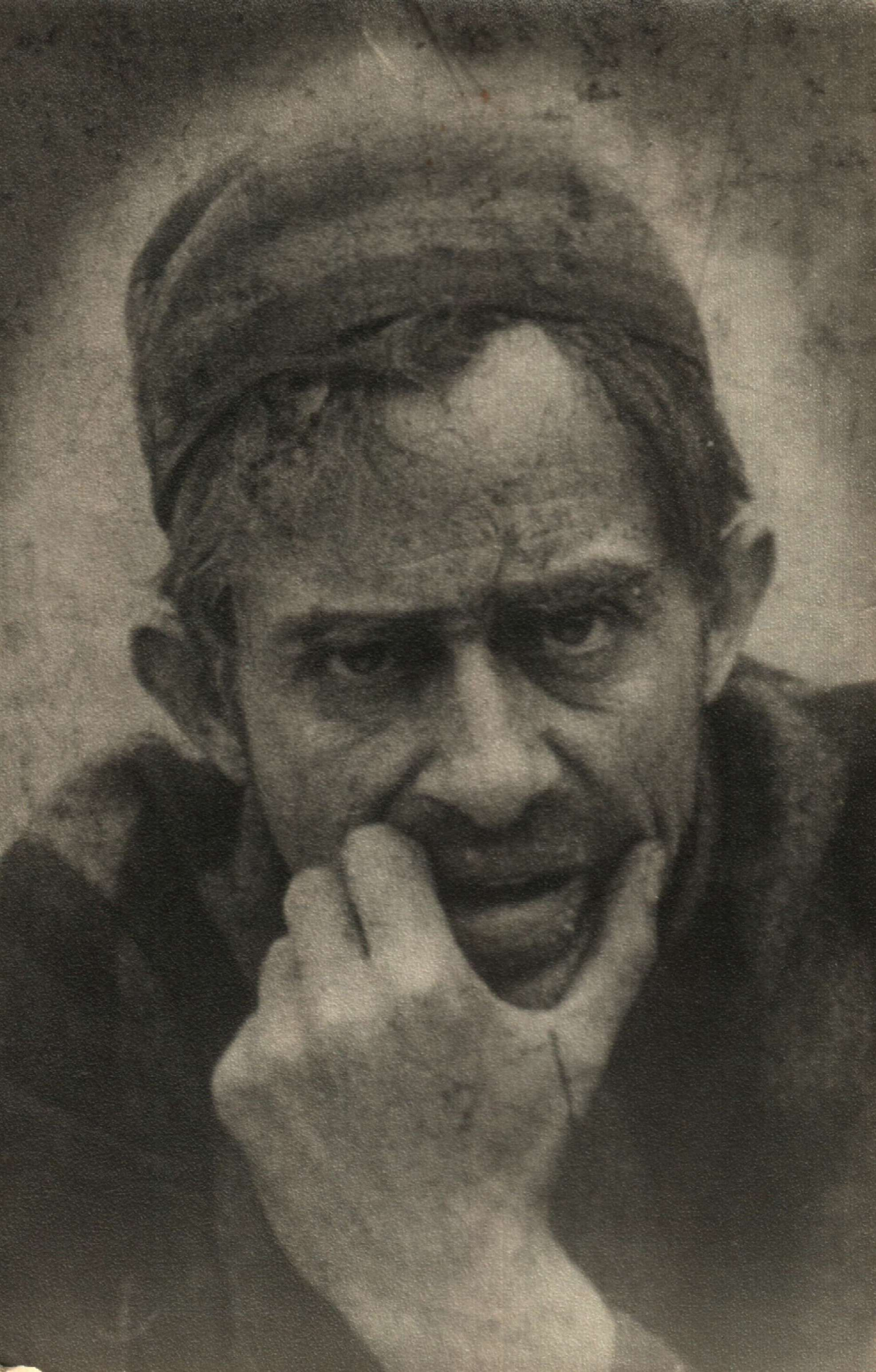
- Born: Vasil Dimov Hadzhigendov (Васил Димов Хаджигендов); 24 November 1891; Sliven, Bulgaria
- Died: 3 September 1970 (aged 78); Sofia, Bulgaria
- Other name: Vassil Gendov
- Occupations: Actor, film director, screenwriter
- Years active: 1910–1937
- Spouse: Ivana Ivanova "Zhana" Gendova

Vasil Gendov (Bulgarian: Васил Гендов. Born Vasil Dimov Hadzhigendov (Bulgarian: Васил Димов Хаджигендов); 24 November 1891 – 3 September 1970) was a Bulgarian film and stage actor, film director and screenwriter. Gendov wrote, directed and had a starring role as an actor in the first feature-length film released in Bulgaria; the 1915 silent film comedy Bulgaran is Gallant. Gendov also produced Bulgaria's first sound film The Slave's Revolt in 1933.

== Early life and career ==
Born Vasil Dimov Hadzhigendov was born in Sliven. He studied at the Tears and Laughter Theatre and the Ivan Vazov National Theatre in Sofia between 1905 and 1907. He made his stage debut as an actor in the role of Robert Pfeiffer in Otto Ernst's play The Educators. After graduating from theatre school in Vienna, he studied in filmmaking in Berlin before touring in a troupe of theatre performers led by Bulgarian stage actress Roza Popova.

== Film ==
In January 1915, Bulgaria's first feature-length film was screened in the capital of Sofia. Bulgaran is Gallant ("Българан е галант") was written, directed by and starred Gendov. The film was a light comedy and Gendov's performance drew comparisons to French actor Max Linder. The film was almost entirely destroyed during the World War II bombardment of Sofia in 1944 and all that remains are one or two frames. Between 1915 and 1937 Gendov would write, produce and appear in eleven films, making him one of the most prolific filmmakers in Bulgaria of the era.

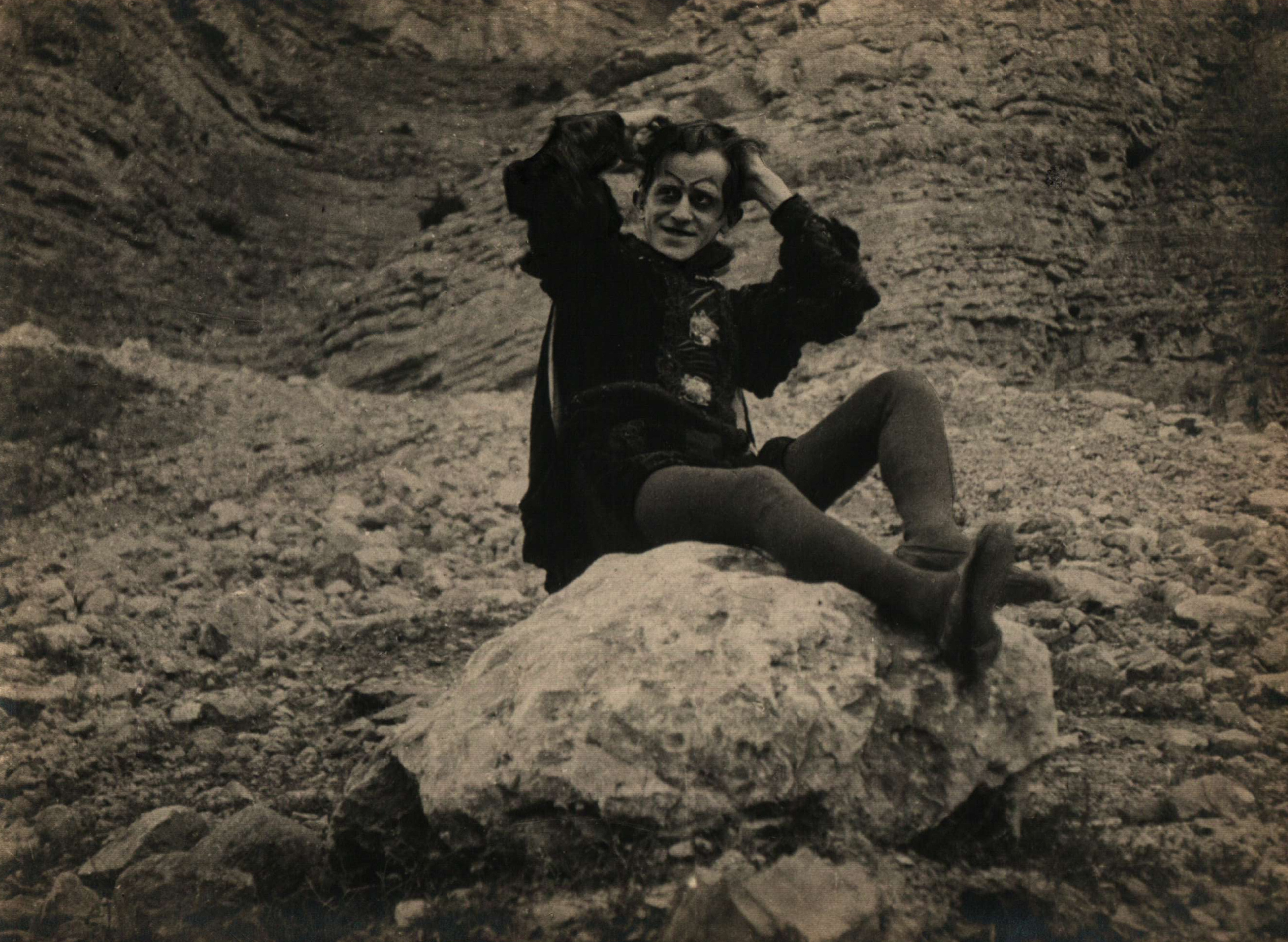
Vasil Gendov on the set of the 1921 film Dyavolat v Sofia.

Gendov would found the first Bulgarian film production cooperative Yantra Film and in 1933 he would write, direct and star in Bulgaria's first sound film The Slave's Revolt ("Бунтът на робите"). The film would also star Gendov's wife Ivana "Zhana" Gendova, who appeared in most of Gendov's films. The film centered on Bulgaria's struggle for independence from the Ottoman Empire and Gendov starred as Vasil Levski, a leading figure in the Bulgarian uprising of 1873. The film proved to be controversial, with the Turkish Minister of Foreign Affairs claiming it 'depicts and demonstrates the imagined tyranny which the Bulgarians experienced under 500 years of Turkish rule,' and 'whose crude and ugly depiction' would 'offend ... the feelings of our nation as well as instigate Bulgarian ideas against us.' The Ministry then demanded an explanation from the Bulgarian government as to why it had given permission for the circulation of such a film. The Bulgarian government defended the film and did not accept the Turkish view that the film was anti-Turkish, pointing out that 'since the imagined events in the film concerned the Ottoman period, [the film] could not be perceived as being against the new Turkish government and nation.'

== Later career, death and legacy ==
Gendov would go on to initiate the establishment of the first Union of Actors in Bulgaria in 1919–1920, the Union of Filmmakers in Bulgaria in 1931 and the Museum of Bulgarian Cinematography in 1948. Vanquished after allying with Hitler, Bulgaria became a socialist people's republic and the film industry was nationalized and organized after the Soviet model in 1948. Gendov was then forced into early retirement from making films. However, he undertook creating the state film archives that would develop into what is now the Bulgarian National Film Archive. Gendov dedicated himself to collecting the films made by his colleagues, as well as film posters and media publications about the Bulgarian film industry.

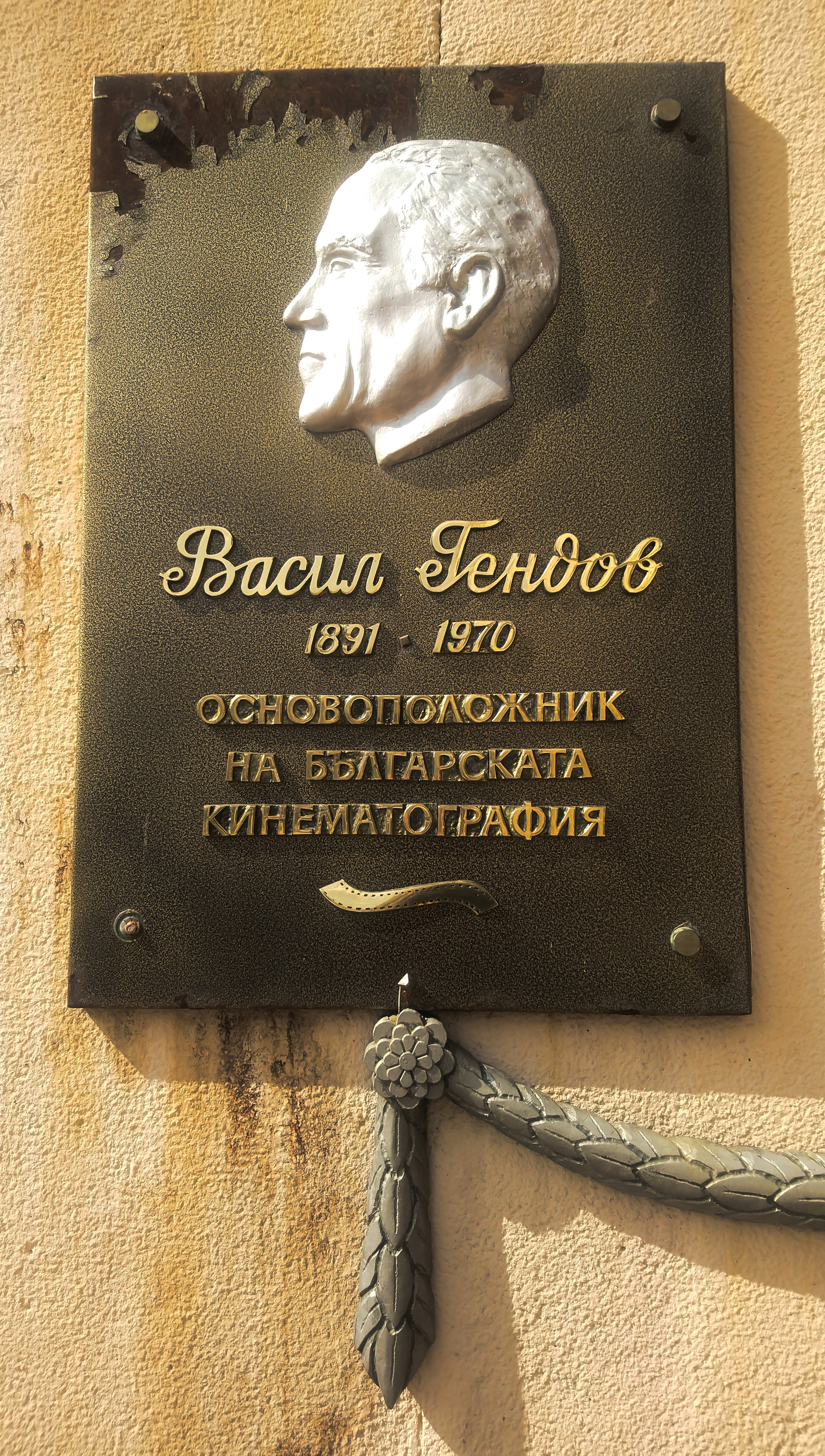
Vasil Gendov memorial plaque in Sliven

Vasil Gendov would live out the remainder of his life in Sofia, where he died in 1970. On 15 January 2015, the centenary of the release of Bulgaran is Gallant, the Bulgarian National Film Archive held a celebration and exhibition at the Odeon Cinema in Sofia. In 2015, Bulgarian filmmaker Iliya Kostov would release the documentary Vasil Gendov - Myth and Reality, which explores Gendov's career and personal life in the context of the social and political situation of Bulgaria in the early twentieth century against the backdrop of the cultural development of Europe and the Balkans. The documentary was released in October 2015 and was screened at the 22nd Golden Rhyton Documentary and Animation Film Festival in December 2015 in Plovdiv.
