= Bulgaran is Gallant =

- Directed by: Vasil Gendov
- Written by: Vasil Gendov
- Starring: Vasil Gendov; Mara Miyateva-Lipina; Angelov
- Release dates: January 13, 1915 (Sofia, Bulgaria)
- Running time: 60 minutes
- Country: Bulgaria
- Languages: Silent film Bulgarian intertitles

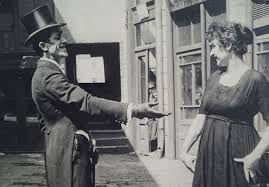
A scene from The Bulgarian Is Gallant

Bulgaran is Gallant (Bulgarian: Българан е галант, romanized: Bŭlgaran e galant) is the first Bulgarian feature film. It is a silent black-and-white comedy written and directed by Vasil Gendov who also stars as the main protagonist Bulgaran. There are different accounts as to when exactly the film was first shown. According to Gendov, shooting started on 16 May 1910 and the première was in the Modern Theatre in Sofia on 22 June 1910. However, the earliest written record of a showing of the film points to 13 January 1915 as the date of the première. The film was almost entirely destroyed during the World War II bombardment of Sofia. All that remains is one or two frames.

== Plot ==
Bulgaran is an elegant and outgoing gentleman. He meets a young lady in the street of the city and starts flirting with her. However, she decides to teach him a lesson and asks if he would accompany her to the marketplace. There she goes on a shopping spree, but it turns out she had left all her money home. The lady asks Bulgaran to lend her some to which plea he readily agrees.

The lady then takes the gentleman to a fancy restaurant where she orders expensive drinks and refreshments, all to Bulgaran's expense. When they are finished in the restaurant Bulgaran is asked to carry the parcels with the lady's purchases to her home. On the way to there, they meet her husband and the lady proposes the couple took a cab to their house so they can relieve the "porter" from his heavy duty. The couple takes the cab leaving the bewildered Bulgaran a coin for his services.

== Cast ==
- Vasil Gendov - Bulgaran
- Mara Miyateva-Lipina - the Lady
- Angelov - the Husband
- Metodi Stanoev - first passer-by
- Todor Stamboliev - second passer-by
- Anton Delbelo - restaurant client
