= Rangel Valchanov =

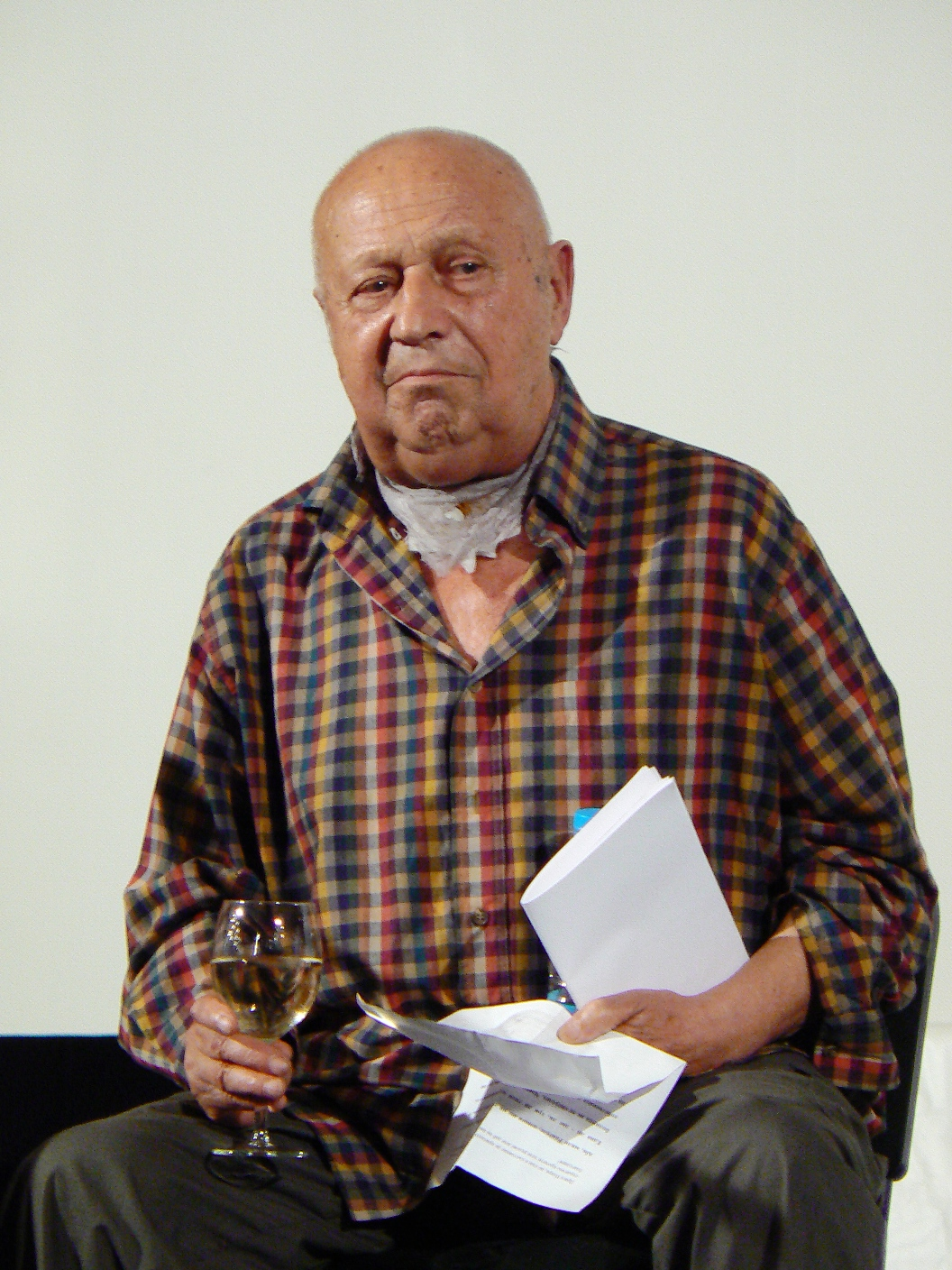
- Bulgarian actor and director
- Born: 12 October 1928; Krivina, Elin Pelin, Bulgaria
- Died: 30 September 2013 (aged 84); Sofia, Bulgaria

Rangel Petrov Valchanov (Bulgarian: Рангел Петров Вълчанов; 12 October 1928 – 30 September 2013) (also seen as Vulchanov) was a Bulgarian cinema actor and director.

He completed his studies in theater directing at the Krastyo Sarafov National Academy for Theatre and Film Arts in 1953. He started working as an assistant director and subsequently as a director. Valchanov worked in Czechoslovakia between 1970 and 1972 where he continued to work on films. He became a member of the European film academy and a "People's artist" in the People's Republic of Bulgaria. He was voted as the best Bulgarian film director of the 20th century.

His 1986 film Where Are You Going? was screened in the Un Certain Regard section the 1986 Cannes Film Festival and was entered into the main competition at the 15th Moscow International Film Festival.

Rangel Valchanov died on 30 September 2013.

== Partial filmography ==
=== Director ===
- Where Are You Going? (1986)
- Judge and the Forest (1975)
- Ezop (1969)
- The Sun and the Shadow (1962)
- First Lesson (1960)
- On the Small Island (1958)
