= Radoy Ralin =

Bulgarian dissident and satirist (1922–2004)

- Радой Ралин
- Born: April 23, 1922; Sliven, Bulgaria
- Died: July 21, 2004 (aged 82); Sofia, Bulgaria
- Resting place: Sofia Central Cemetery
- Education: Sofia University
- Occupations: Writer, poet, satirist

Radoy Ralin (Bulgarian: Радой Ралин; April 23, 1922 – July 22, 2004), born Dimitar Stefanov Stoyanov (Bulgarian: Димитър Стефанов Стоянов) was a Bulgarian dissident, poet, and satirist.

After the downfall of the communist regime, he was urged to run for Parliament, but adamantly refused.

His works have been translated into 37 languages.

== Honours ==
Radoy Ralin Peak on Livingston Island in the South Shetland Islands, Antarctica is named after Radoy Ralin.
