= List of Bulgarian films of the 1970s =

A list of the most notable films produced in Bulgaria during the 1970s grouped by year of release. For an alphabetical list of articles on Bulgarian films see Category:Bulgarian films.

== 1970 ==
Title	Transliteration / English	Director	Length	Cast	Notes
1970
Баш Майсторът	Bash Maystorat; The Past-Master	Petar B. Vasilev	65 min	Kiril Gospodinov, Yuriy Yakovlev, Valentina Borisova, Vladimir Davchev, Veselina Nikolaeva	feature film (comedy, family)
България в Москва	Bulgaria in Moscow	Dora Vinarova			feature film
Бондарь	The Cooper	Georgi Djulgerov			Grand Prize, International Short Film Festival Oberhausen
Езоп	Ezop; Aesop	Rangel Vulchanov	98 min	Georgi Kaloyanchev, Dorotea Toncheva, Stoyanka Mutafova, Djoko Rosich	feature film (drama)
Лице под маска	Litse Pod Maska; The Face Under The Mask	Rangel Vulchanov			
Кит	Kit; Whale	Petar B. Vasilev	76 min	Georgi Kaloyanchev, Dimitar Panov, Georgi Partsalev, Grigor Vachkov, Tsvyatko Nikolov, Evstati Stratev	
Князът	The Prince	Petar B. Vasilev	101 min	Stefan Danailov, Georgi Cherkelov, Violeta Gindeva, Dorotea Toncheva	feature film
Наследници	Naslednitsi; Survivors	Ivan Veselinov			
Петимата от „Моби Дик“	Five from "Moby Dick"	Grisha Ostrovski; Todor Stoyanov	96 min	Georgi Partsalev, Marius Donkin, Iriney Konstantinov, Sashka Bratanova	feature film (adventure)
Прометей	Prometey; Prometheus XX	Todor Dinov	6 min		animated short film
С особено мнение	In The Dissenting Opinion	Lada Boyadjieva; Yanush Vazov	83 min	Petar Chernev, Zhivko Garvanov, Stoycho Mazgalov, Rumyana Georgieva	feature film (drama)
Сбогом, приятели!	Farewell, Friends!	Borislav Sharaliev	97 min	Vladimir Smirnov, Mladen Mladenov, Tanya Masalitinova, Nikolay Binev	feature film
Старецът	Old Man	Petar Kaishev			
Цитаделата отговори	Citadel Answers	Gencho Genchev			
Черните ангели	Black Angels	Vulo Radev	90 min	Stefan Danailov, Dorotea Toncheva, Violeta Gindeva, Yosif Surchadzhiev	feature film (drama)

== 1971 ==
Title	Transliteration / English	Director	Length	Cast	Notes
1971
Герловска история	Gerlovska History	Grisha Ostrovski	92 min	Yordanka Kuzmanova, Yuriy Yakovlev, Vasil Mihailov, Marin Mladenov	feature film (drama)
Гигант край Дунава	Giant Along the Danube	Dora Vinarova			Award for short promotional film at the Venice International Film Festival
Гневно пътуване	Wrathful Journey	Nikola Korabov	90 min	Yosif Surchadzhiev, Dorotea Toncheva, Severina Teneva, Nikola Todev	feature film (drama), entered into the 7th Moscow International Film Festival
Гола съвест	Stripped conscience	Milen Nikolov	51 min	Konstantin Kotsev, Georgi Georgiev-Gocheto, Zhelcho Mandadzhiev, Naum Shopov	feature film (comedy)
Демонът на империята	Demon of the Empire	Vili Tsankov	678 min	Iliya Dobrev, Georgi Kaloyanchev, Kosta Tsonev, Georgi Cherkelov	historical drama 10 67-min segments
Изпит	The Test	Georgi Djulgerov			Youth Jury Award, Locarno International Film Festival
Края на песента	The End of the Song				
Лице под маска	The Face Under the Mask	Rangel Vulchanov			
Малка дневна музика	Malka Dnevna Muzika; A Little Chamber Music	Ivan Veselinov			
На всеки километър II	Every Kilometer II	Nedelcho Chernev, Lubomir Sharlandzhiev	75 min	Stefan Danailov, Grigor Vachkov, Georgi Cherkelov, Stefan Getzov	serial adventure 13 5-min segments
Не се обръщай назад	Do Not Turn Back	Ludmil Kirkov	84 min	Asen Georgiev, Dimitar Buynozov, Yordanka Kuzmanova, Anton Gorchev	feature film (war)
Необходимият грешник	The Required Sinner	Borislav Sharaliev	88 min	Kosta Tsonev, Maya Dragomanska, Yavor Milushev, Ani Tsaneva	feature film (drama)
Няма нищо по-хубаво от лошото време	There Is Nothing Better Than Bad Weather	Konstantin Dzhidrov	129 min	Georgi Georgiev-Getz, Elena Raynova, Kosta Tsonev, Georgi Partsalev	feature film (thriller)
Откраднатият влак	The Stolen Train	Vladimir Yanchev	81 min	Stefan Iliev, Georgi Kaloyanchev, Boris Arabov, Dobrinka Stankova	feature film (drama)
Птици долитат	Birds Come Flying to Us	Zahari Zhandov	95 min	Jordan Mitov, Neli Topalova, Borislav Ivanov, Viktor Danchenko	
Странен двубой	The Strange Duel	Todor Stoyanov	101 min	Peter Slabakov, Leon Nemtsik, Nevena Kokanova, Margarita Chudinova	feature film (crime)
Таралежите се раждат без бодли	Hedgehogs Are Born Without Spines	Dimitar Petrov	84 min	Ivaylo Dzhambazov, Neiko Neikov, Petar Peychev, Andrei Slabakov	feature family comedy
Тримата от запаса	Three Reservists	Zako Heskija	97 min	Georgi Partsalev, Kiril Gospodinov, Nikola Anastasov	
Четиримата от вагона	Four From the Wagon	Atanas Traikov	90 min	Yuri Sarantsev, Sergei Nikonenko, Lev Praygunov, Rudolf Pankov	feature (drama)
ШАРЕН СВЯТ					

== 1972 ==
Title	Transliteration / English	Director	Length	Cast	Notes
1972
Автостоп	Hitchhiking	Nikola Petkov	75 min	Tzvetana Maneva, Nikolay Uzunov, Violeta Pavlova, Konstantin Kotsev, Yuriy Yakovlev	feature film (musical)
Вятърът на пътешествията	Tail Wind	Lada Boyadjieva	95 min	Ivan Arshinkov, Joseph Surchadzhiev, Peter Slabakov, Leon Nemtsik	feature
Глутницата	The Reservoir	Ivanka Grabcheva	91 min	Kosta Tsonev, Stoicho Mazgalov, Meglena Karalambova, Kiril Gospodinov	feature film (drama, adventure)
10 дни неплатени	10 Days Unpaid	Janusz Vazov	87 min	Elena Stefanova, Margarita Chudinova, Mladen Mladenov, Neycho Popov	feature film (drama)
Козият рог	The Goat Horn	Metodi Andonov	100 min	Anton Gorchev, Katya Paskaleva, Milen Penev, Todor Kolev	feature film - numerous awards
Кръгове на обичта	Circles Of Love	Kiril Ilinchev	75 min	Kolyo Donchev, Kristyan Fokov, Stefan Stefanov, Ivan Nestorov	
Момчето си отива	The Boy Turns Man	Lyudmil Kirkov	101 min	Nevena Kokanova, Filip Trifonov, Sashka Bratanova, Kiril Gospodinov, Evstati Stratev	numerous awards
НА ЗАЗОРЯВАНЕ					
Наковалня или чук	Hammer Or Anvil	Christo Christov	157 min	Stefan Getzov, William Polonia, Frank Oberman, Ivan Andreev	feature drama
Обич	Affection	Ludmil Staikov	90 min	Violeta Doneva, Nevena Kokanova, Stefan Danailov, Banco Bank	Won the Golden Prize at Moscow
С деца на море	With Children at the Seaside	Dimitar Petrov	80 min	Georgi Partsalev, Petar Peychev, Ivaylo Dzhambazov, Emil Petrov, Krasimir Mariyanov	feature family comedy
Стихове	Poetry	Margarit Nikolov	52 min	Nikolai Burlyaev, Todor Shtonov, Dimo Dzhikov, Federico Zahariev	feature drama
Сърце човешко	A Human Heart	Ivan Nitchev	90 min	Georgi Stoyanov, Nevena Kokanova, Andrei Chaprazov, Filip Maleev, Yuriy Yakovlev	feature film (drama)
Татул	Tatul	Atanas Traikov	93 min	Elena Stefanova, Meglena Karalambova, Ivan Nalbantov, Anton Gorchev	feature film (drama)
Тихият беглец	The Quiet Fugitive	Petar B. Vasilev	71 min	Konstantin Kotsev, Zhorzheta Chakarova, Valentina Borisova, Zhivko Garvanov	feature film
Трета след слънцето	Third From The Sun	Georgi Stoyanov	127 min	Itzhak Finzi, Naum Shopov, Nikolay Nikolaev, Pepa Nikolova	feature film (fiction)
ХЛЯБ	Bread				
Чертичката	The Mark	Rashko Uzunov	42 min	Plamen Petkov, Violeta Gindeva, Adriana Andreeva, Ivan Yanchev	short
Корените на изгряващото слънце	Roots of the Rising Sun	Vulo Radev			
Шанс		Rangel Vulchanov			

== 1973 ==
Title	Transliteration / English	Director	Length	Cast	Notes
1973
Бягство в Ропотамо	Byagstvo v Ropotamo; Escape in Ropotamo	Rangel Vulchanov	111 min	Natalia Markova, Dimitar Tashev, Georgi Kaloyanchev, Konstantin Kotsev	feature film (musical)
Бялата одисея	White Odyssey	Vasil Mirchev	97 min	Naum Shopov, Katya Paskaleva, Anton Gorchev, Rousy Chanev	feature film (drama)
Голямата победа	Great Victory	Vasil Mirchev	106 min	Kosta Tsonev, Yosif Surchadzhiev, Penka Tsitselkova, Dosyo Dosev	feature film (drama)
Голямата скука	Great Boredom	Metodi Andonov	71 min	Anton Gorchev, Kosta Tsonev, Tzvetana Maneva, Elena Raynova	feature film (crime)
Деца играят вън	Children Play Out of Doors	Ivanka Grabcheva	96 min	Dimitar Ganev, Nikolai Danailov, Ognyan Atanasov, Nevena Kokanova	feature film (comedy, family)
Дъщерите на началника	Daughters of the Head	Nedelcho Chernev	179 min	Violeta Gindeva, Sashka Bratanova, Stefan Getzov, Marin Mladenov	feature film (drama)
И дойде денят	And the Day Came	Georgi Djulgerov	86 min	Plamen Maslarov, Elena Mirchovska, Asen Kisimov, Pantaley Pantaleev	feature film (drama)
Игрек 17	Y 17	Vili Tsankov	104 min	Ivan Kondov, Yosef Blakha, Dorotha Toncheva, Anani Yavashev	feature film (crime)
Като песен	By Song	Irina Aktasheva, Khristo Piskov	101 min	Filip Trifonov, Vasil Mikhailov, Irina Rosich, Georgi Mamalev	feature film (drama)
Мандолината	Mandolinata; The Mandolin	Ilya Velchev	66 min	Yuri Angelov, Peter Slabakov, Sashka Bratanova, Dosyo Dosev	Best cinematography and production design, Baghdad
Мъже без работа	Men Without Work	Ivan Terziev	75 min	Stefan Peychev, Valentin Gadzhokov, Georgi Bahchevanov, Katya Paskaleva	feature film (drama)
Мирът	Peace	Dora Vinarova			feature
Най-добрият човек, когото познавам!	The Kindest Person I Know	Lyubomir Sharlandzhiev	90 min	Nevena Kokanova, Peter Slabakov, Grigor Vachkov, Vladimir Smirnov, Dimitar Manchev	Nevena Kokanova: Best Actress, Festival of Bulgarian Feature Films, 1973
Нона	Nona	Grisha Ostrovski	84 min	Dorotea Toncheva, Stefan Danailov, Nikola Todev, Dimitar Yordanov	feature film (drama)
Опак човек	An Ornery Man	Yanko Yankov	91 min	Stefan Getzov, Anton Karastoyanov, Yordan Taralezhkov, Graziela Bachvarova	feature film (comedy)
Очакване	Expectation	Borislav Sharaliev	77 min	Georgi Cherkelov, Ivan Andonov, Georgi Dzhubrilov, Albena Kazakova	feature film (drama)
Последната дума	The Last Word	Binka Zhelyazkova	118 min	Yana Gurova, Tzvetana Maneva, Aneta Petrovska, Emilia Radeva	feature film (drama); Entered in 1974 Cannes Film Festival
Преброяване на дивите зайци	Prebroyavane na Divite Zaytsi; The Hare Census	Eduard Zahariev	69 min	Itzhak Fintzi, Nikola Todev, Evstati Stratev, Todor Kolev, Georgi Rusev	feature film (comedy); Second Prize, Locarno, 1974; Second prize and the Critics Award FIPRESI, Varna, 1973
Сиромашко Лято	Siromashko Lyato; Indian Summer	Milen Nikolov	79 min.	Georgi Partsalev, Tatyana Lolova, Ivan Kondov, Itzhak Fintzi, Leda Taseva	comedy and drama
Страх	Strakh; Fear	Ivan Veselinov			
Тъпанът	Tapanat; The Kettle-Drum	Todor Dinov			cartoon
Тигърчето	Little Tiger	Mariana Evstatieva-Biolcheva	84 min	Vladko Vasilev, Nevena Kokanova, Vasil Mikhailov, Emilia Radeva	feature film (family)

== 1974 ==
Title	Transliteration / English	Director	Length	Cast	Notes
1974
Баща ми, бояджията	My Father the House-Painter	Stefan Dimitrov	87 min	Kosta Tsonev, Nevena Kokanova, Itzhak Fintzi, Svetoslav Peev	feature film (musical)
Бразилска мелодия	Brazilian Melody	Milen Getov	150 min	Kosta Tsonev, Lyubomir Dimitrov, Stefan Sarbov, Lachezar Stoyanov	feature film (crime)
Дневна светлина	Daylight	Margarit Nikolov	77 min	Ivan Kondov, Mladen Kiselov, Peter Slabakov, Vesselin Tanev	feature film (drama)
Дубльорът	Dublyorat; Double	Ilya Velchev	106 min	Madlen Cholakova, Iriney Konstantinov, Dosyo Dosev, Naum Shopov	feature film (drama)
Дърво без корен	A Tree Without Roots	Christo Christov	86 min	Nikola Dadov, Nevena Kokanova, Marin Yanev, Nikolai Kedev	feature film (drama)
Зарево над Драва	Dawn Over the Drava	Zako Heskiya	161 min	Georgi Georgiev-Getz, Georgi Cherkelov, Lidia Valkova, Dobrinka Stankova	feature film (war, drama, adventure)
Засада	Ambush	Orfey Tzokov	75 min	Bogomil Atanasov, Renata Dralcheva, Vasil Popiliev, Petar Penkov	feature film (drama)
Иван Кондарев	Ivan Kondarev	Nikola Korabov	169 min	Anton Gorchev, Katya Paskaleva, Stefan Danailov, Ivan Andonov	feature film (drama)
Изкуствената патица	Artificial Duck	Yanush Vazov	88 min	Evgenia Barakova, Ivan Kutevski, Georgi Stoyanov, Yoana Popova	feature film (crime, drama)
Изпити по никое време	Exams At Any Time	Ivanka Grabcheva	80 min	Dimitar Ganev, Voichekh Todorov, Ani Bakalova, Georgi Rusev	feature film (family, comedy)
Къщи без огради	Houses Without Walls	Georgi Stoyanov		Kircho Petrov, Konstantin Kotsev, Stefan Danailov, Leda Taseva	feature film (drama)
Ламята	Lamia	Todor Dinov	78 min	Nikola Todev, Georgi Partsalev, Valcho Kamarashev, Vasil Mikhailov	feature film (comedy, fantasy)
На живот и смърт	On Life Or Death	Nedelcho Chernev		Stefan Danailov, Stefan Getzov, Nevena Kokanova, Katya Paskaleva	feature film
На чисто	On Purity	Leon Daniel	92 min	Petya Vangelova, Iva Ivanova, Georgi Novakov, Rashko Mladenov	feature film (drama)
Пазачът на крепостта	Warden of the Fortress	Milen Nikolov	74 min	Yordan Kovachev, Katya Stoylova, Alexander Pritap, George Mamalev	feature film (drama)
Последният ерген	The Last Bachelor	Vladimir Yanchev	82 min	Todor Kolev, Georgi Georgiev-Getz, Andrei Chaprazov, Tatiana Lolova	feature film (comedy)
Последно лято	The Last Summer	Christo Christov	86 min	Grigor Vachkov, Dimitar Ikonomov, Bogdan Spasov, Vesko Zekhirev	feature film (drama)
Селкор	Selkor	Atanas Traikov	88 min	Anton Gorchev, Rachko Yabandzhiev, Grigor Vachkov, Stoicho Mazgalov	feature film
Селянинът с колелото	Selyaninat s Koleloto; A Peasant on a Bicycle	Lyudmil Kirkov	102 min.	Georgi Georgiev-Getz, Georgi Rusev, Diana Chelebieva, Svetoslav Peev, Evstati Stratev	Feature film (drama), entered into the 9th Moscow International Film Festival
Синята лампа	The Blue Lamp	Mariana Evstatieva-Biolcheva, Georgi Georgiev, Veselin Vachev	223 min	Mladen Mladenov, Nikola Todev, Ivan Dorin, Rachko Yabandzhiev	serial (crime)
Спомен	Memories	Ivan Nitchev	87 min	Ivan Arshinkov, Tadeush Fievski, Violeta Gindeva, Katya Paskaleva	feature film (drama, adventure)
Термити	Termiti; Termites	Vasil Vasilev			
Трудна любов	Trudna Lyubov; Tough Love	Ivan Andonov	85 min	Tzvetana Maneva, Ivan Andonov, Georgi Cherkelov, Zhorzheta Chakarova	feature film (drama)

== 1975 ==
Title	Transliteration / English	Director	Length	Cast	Notes
1975
Следователят и гората	Sledovatelyat i gorata Judge and the Forest	Rangel Vulchanov	102 min	Lyubomir Bachvarov	
Буна	Buna	Vili Tsankov	102 min	Tzvetana Maneva, Ilka Zafirova, Ivan Kondov, Anton Gorchev	feature film (drama, adventure)
Вечни времена	Forever	Asen Shopov	107 min	Peter Slabakov, Maria Spasunova, Stoicho Mazgalov, Stoyan Gadev	feature film (drama) (1974?)
Виза за океана	Visa for the Ocean	Lada Boyadjieva	81 min	Anton Gorchev, Silvia Rangelova, Kiril Gospodinov, Georgi Stoyanov	feature film
Вилна зона	Villa Zone	Eduard Zahariev	79 min	Katya Paskaleva, Itzhak Fintzi, Naum Shopov, Stefka Berova, Georgi Rusev, Evstati Stratev	feature film (tragicomedy)
Магистрала	The Highway	Stefan Dimitrov	90 min	Ivan Kondov, Kosta Tsonev, Konstantin Kotsev, Zhelcho Mandadzhiev	feature film
Мечтател	The Dreamer	Liliana Batuleva	55 min	Stefanos Gulyamdzhis, Nikola Dadov, Bogomil Simeonov, Violeta Nikolova	feature film (drama)
Началото на деня	The Beginning of the Day	Dimitar Petrov	88 min	Tzvetana Maneva, Stefan Danailov, Vladimir Smirnov, Todor Kolev	feature film (drama)
Неделните мачове	Sunday Games	Todor Andreykov	91 min	Kostadin Kiriakov, Kornelia Petkova, Ivo Rusev, Georgi Petkov	feature film (drama)
Незабравимият ден	The Unforgettable Day	Petar Donev	94 min	Stoicho Mazgalov, Ognyan Zhelyazkov, Natalia Markova, Bozidar Grigorov	feature film (drama)
Осъдени души	Osadeni Dushi; Doomed Souls	Vulo Radev	141 min	Jan Englert, Edit Szalai, Rousy Chanev, Mariana Dimitrova	feature film (war, drama); Award for scenography UBA
Откъде се знаем?	How Do We Know?	Nikola Lyubomirov	32 min	Elena Dimitrova, Pavel Popandov, Bogdan Glishev, Djoko Rosich	feature film (drama, short)
При никого	If Anyone	Ivanka Grabcheva	77 min	Djoko Rositch, Petar Petrov, Ani Bakalova, Aleko Kochev	feature film
Присъствие	Presence	Todor Stoyanov	93 min	Kolyo Donchev, Georgi Cherkelov, Penka Tsitselkova, Mariana Dimitrova	feature film (drama)
Ръкоделие	Rakodelie; Needlework	Ivan Veselinov			
Сватбите на Йоан Асен	The Weddings of King John Asen	Vili Tsankov	161 min	Apostol Karamitev, Kosta Tsonev, Ivan Kondov, Nevena Kokanova	feature film (drama, historical)
Силна вода	Heavy water	Ivan Terziev	85 min	Ivan Grigorov, Kiril Kavadarkov, Veljko Kanev, Filip Trifonov	Силна вода
Сладко и горчиво	Sladko I Gorchivo; Sweet and Bitter	Ilya Velchev	93 min	Peter Slabakov, Yuri Angelov, Nikola Dadov, Venelin Pehlivanov	feature film (drama)
Следователят и гората	The Judge and the Forest	Rangel Vulchanov	102 min	Lubomir Bachvarov, Sonia Bozhkova, Alexander Pritap, Georgi Kishkilov	feature film (drama)
Този истински мъж	A Real Man	Aleksandar Obreshkov	84 min	Stefan Danailov, Elena Dimitrova, Pavel Popandov, Rositsa Danailova	feature film (drama)
Този хубав живот	This good life	Maria Ruseva	75 min	Vasil Popiliev, Medi Dimitrova, Svetla Dobrinovich, Georgi Stoyanov	feature film (drama)

== 1976 ==
Title	Transliteration / English	Director	Length	Cast	Notes
1976
Щурец в ухото	Shturets v Uhoto; A Cricket in the Ear	Georgi K. Stoyanov	95 min	Pavel Popandov, Stefan Mavrodiev, Tatyana Lolova, Itzhak Fintzi, Petar Slabakov	feature film (comedy)
Циклопът	Tsiklopat; Cyclops	Christo Christov	96 min	Mihail Mutafov	27th Berlin International Film Festival
Апостолите	Apostolite; Apostles	Georgi Branev	130 min	Radko Dishliev, Antoni Genov, Stoyan Stoev, Vasil Mirchovski	feature film (drama)
Вината	Wines	Veselina Gerinska	86 min	Tzvetana Maneva, Katya Paskaleva, Svetla Dobrinovich, Stefan Danailov	feature film (drama)
Войникът от обоза	The Soldier from the Baggage	Ivan Dobrolyubov	80 min	Anatoly Kuznetsov, Stefan Danailov, Svetlana Toma, Nikola Todev	feature film (drama, war)
Да изядеш ябълката	To Eat the Apple	Nikola Rudarov	93 min	Asen Kisimov, Stefan Iliev, Tzvetana Maneva, Anton Karastoyanov	feature film (thriller, drama)
Два диоптъра далекогледство	Dva Dioptara Dalekogledstvo; Farsighted for Two Diopters	Petar B. Vasilev	89 min	Georgi Partsalev, Dimitar Panov, Sashka Bratanova, Valentin Gadzhokov, Ivan Obretenov, Yuriy Yakovlev	feature film (comedy)
Допълнение към закона за защита на държавата	Dopalnenie kam zakona za zashtita na darzhavata Supplement to the Law on Protection of the State	Lyudmil Staikov	147 min	Stefan Getsov, Georgi Georgiev-Getz, Georgi Cherkelov, Ivan Kondov	feature film (drama)
Един наивник на средна възраст	One Silly Middle-Aged	Milen Getov	100 min	Ivan Andonov, Nevena Mandadzhieva, Margarita Stefanova, Angel Georgiev	feature film (crime)
Изгори, за да светиш	Burn to Be a Light	Nedelcho Chernev	420 min	Kosta Tsonev, Tzvetana Maneva, Aleksei Batalov, Georgi Cherkelov	feature film (adventure)
Записки по българските въстания	Notes on Bulgarian Uprisings	Georgi Branev, Veselin Branev	975 min	Radko Dishliev, Antoni Genov, Stoyan Stoev, Aleksandar Aleksandrov	Bulgarian feature film (drama, historical)
Не си отивай!	Don't Go Away	Lyudmil Kirkov	95 min	Filip Trifonov, Sashka Bratanova, Nevena Kokanova, Elena Mirchovska	feature film (drama)
Спомен за близначката	Memory of the Twin Sister	Lyubomir Sharlandzhiev	139 min	Nevena Kokanova, Emilia Radeva, Nikola Todev, Lachezar Tsonchev	feature film (drama)

== 1977 ==
Title	Transliteration / English	Director	Length	Cast	Notes
1977
Авантаж	Advantage	Georgi Djulgerov	135 min	Rousy Chanev, Plamen Donchev, Maria Statoulova, Plamena Getova	Laceno d'Oro at the Avellino Neorealism Film Festival in Avellino, Italy; Silver Bear for Best Director at Berlin
Барутен буквар	Powder Primer	Todor Dinov	78 min	Marin Yanev, Vasil Popiliev, Peter Slabakov, Ivan Grigorov	feature film (drama)
Басейнът	The Swimming Pool	Binka Zhelyazkova	148 min	Kosta Tsonev, Yanina Kasheva, Kliment Denchev, Tzvetana Maneva	feature film (drama), entered into the 10th Moscow International Film Festival
Бой последен	Boi Posleden; The Last Battle	Zako Heskiya	143 min	Ivan Bardzhev, Iliya Karaivanov, Vasil Banov, Dimitar Hadzhiski	feature film (drama)
Войници на свободата	Soldiers of Freedom	Yuri Ozerov	599 min	Stefan Getzov, Bokhus Pastorek, Horst Preusker, Yakov Tripolski	feature film (war, drama)
Годеницата с най-красивите очи	Bride With The Most Beautiful Eyes	Jan Schmidt	82 min	Milan Knyazhko, Elena Dimitrova, Bokhumil Varva, Zhana Brezkova	feature film (family, fantasy)
Година от понеделници	Year of Mondays	Borislav Punchev	115 min	Kosta Tsonev, Yordanka Kuzmanova, Stefan Danailov, Lachezar Tsochev	feature film (drama)
Дуел 77	Duel 77				
Завръщане от Рим	Return From Rome	Ilya Velchev	265 min	Yuri Angelov, Milen Penev, Rayna Vasileva, Peter Slabakov	feature film (drama)
Задача с много неизвестни	Problem With Many Unknowns	Liliana Pencheva	65 min	Nikolai Uzunov, Vladimir Nikolov, Svetozar Nedelchev, Kiril Balabanov	feature film (family, adventure)
Звезди в косите, сълзи в очите	Stars in Her Hair, Tears in Her Eyes	Ivan Nitchev	102 min	Peter Slabakov, Katya Paskaleva, Tatiana Lolova, Nikolay Binev	feature film (drama)
Лъжовни истории		Maya Vaptsarova	66 min	Katya Paskaleva, Petar Petrov, Ivan Grigorov, Anton Karastoyanov	feature film (comedy)
Матриархат	The Matriarchy	Lyudmil Kirkov	103 min	Nevena Kokanova, Katya Paskaleva, Katya Chukova, Georgi Georgiev-Getz, Evstati Stratev	feature film (drama)
Мъжки времена	Manly Times	Eduard Zahariev	125 min	Mariana Dimitrova, Grigor Vachkov, Velko Kanev, Pavel Poppandov	feature film (drama)
От другата страна на огледалото	Ot Drugata Strana Na Ogledaloto; On the Other Side of the Mirror	Ilya Velchev	95 min	Renata Draltscheva, Yuri Angelov, Irinei Konstantinov, Grozdan Getzov	feature film
5 + 1					
Петимата от РМС	Five Young Workers	Vladislav Ikonomov	330 min	Dorotea Toncheva, Sashka Bratanova, Stefan Danailov, Andrei Avramov	feature film (drama)
По дирята на безследно изчезналите	On the Trail of the Missing	Margarit Nikolov	197 min	Naum Shopov, Boris Lukanov, Lyubomir Mladenov, Asen Milanov	feature drama
Ръчичка - ръкавичка	Rachichka - Rakavichka; Hands - Gloves	Ivan Veselinov			
Слънчев удар	Sunstroke	Irina Aktasheva, Khristo Piskov			
Срещу вятъра	Against The Wind	Christo Christov	94 min	Mikhail Mutafov, Grigor Vachkov, Ivan Ivanov, Evgenia Barakova	
Хирурзи	Surgeons	Ivanka Grabcheva		Iskra Radeva, Vasil Mihailov, Dimitar Ganev, Naycho Petrov	
Хора отдалече	People From Far Away	Nikola Rudarov		Zachary Zhandov, Atanas Tsenev, Stoyan Gadev, Georgi Stoyanov	

== 1978 ==
Title	Transliteration / English	Director	Length	Cast	Notes
1978
Адиос, мучачос	Adios, Muchachos; Bye, Boys	Yanko Yankov	80 min	Petar Stoyanov, Ani Petrova, Lachezar Tsochev, Mikhail Meltev	feature film (drama)
Бъди благословена	Be Blessed	Aleksandar Obreshkov		Mariana Dimitrova, Dorotea Toncheva, Evgenia Barakova, Maria Statulova	feature film (drama)
Всеки ден, всяка нощ	Every Day, Every Night	Vladislav Ikonomov	85 min	Velyo Goranov, Mikhail Botevski, Georgi Vasilev, Dimitar Kokanov	feature film (drama)
Всички и никой	Everybody and Nobody	Krikor Azarian	104 min	Velko Kanev, Grigor Vachkov, Nikola Dadov, Konstantin Kotsev	feature film (drama)
Големият товар	Big Load	Ivan Komitov	130 min	Anton Gorchev, Bogomil Simeonov, Djoko Rositch, Stefan Getsov	feature film (crime)
Инструмент ли е гайдата?	Is The Bagpipe An Instrument?	Asen Chopov	82 min	Filip Trifonov, Detelina Lazarova, Peter Slabakov, Grigor Vachkov	feature film (drama)
Компарсита	Komparsita	Nikola Petkov	79 min	Stefan Iliev, Bistra Marcheva, Ivan Kondov, Vasil Dimitrov	feature film (drama)
Ла-ла-ла	La-La-La	Ivan Veselinov			
Момчетата от „Златен лъв“	The Guys From The "Gold Lion"	Lyuben Morchev	105 min	Ivan Kondov, Georgi Partsalev, Svetoslav Peev, Kliment Denchev	feature film (fantasy, adventure)
Насрещно движение	Oncoming Traffic	Todor Stoyanov	91 min	Stefan Danailov, Ivan Kondov, Georgi Stoyanov, Iskra Radeva	feature film (drama)
Нечиста сила	Unclean Force	Pavel Pavlov	202 min	Elena Raynova, Ivan Obretenov, Vasil Mihailov, Anton Gorchev	feature film (drama)
Пантелей	Panteley	Georgi Stoyanov	103 min	Pavel Poppandov, Konstantin Kotsev, Nikola Atanasov, Dobrinka Stankova	feature film (comedy)
Патенцето и елхичката	Patentseto I Elkhichkata	Ivan Veselinov			
Покрив	The Roof	Ivan Andonov	93 min	Peter Slabakov, Pepa Nikolova, Maria Statulova, Grigor Vachkov	feature film (drama)
Правилата	Rules	Orfei Tsokov	88 min	Ivan Nalbantov, Svetozar Nedelchev, Damyan Antonov, Yakim Mikhov,	feature film
Рали	Rally	Vili Tsankov	166 min	Ivo Khristov, Mikhail Mutafov, Djoko Rosich, Dilorom Kambarova	feature film
С любов и нежност	With Love and Tenderness	Rangel Vulchanov	86 min	Aleksandar Dyakov, Tsvetana Eneva, Gergana Gerasimova, Eugenia Barakova	feature film (drama)
Служебно положение ординарец	Officially Orderly Situation	Kiran Kolarov	80 min	Elefteria Elefterov, Tzvetana Maneva, Petar Despotov, Valcho Kamarashev	feature film (drama)
100 тона щастие	100 Tons Of Happiness	Petar B. Vasilev	72 min	Ivan Yanchev, Kiril Gospodinov, Todor Kolev, Diana Khristova	feature film (comedy)
Талисман	Talisman	Rashko Uzunov	78 min	Daniela Boyanova, Mikhail Milchev, Maria Stefanova, Emilia Radeva	feature film (family)
Топло	Toplo; Heat	Vladimir Yanchev	97 min	Naum Shopov, Konstantin Kotsev, Stoyan Stoychev, Georgi Cherkelov	feature film (comedy)
Трампа	Trampa; The Swap	Georgi Djulgerov	90 min	Tanya Shahova, Ilia Dobrev, Jana Mircheva, Valcho Kamarashev	feature film (drama)
Умирай само в краен случай	Die Only As A Last Resort	Milen Getov	178 min	Kosta Tsonev, Barbara Brylska, Nikolay Binev, Ivan Kondov	2-part serial (crime)
Утрото е неповторимо	Morning Is Unique	Nikola Lyubomirov		Dosyo Dosev, Lubomir Bachvarov, Kunka Baeva, Lachezar Stoyanov	
Чуй петела	Hark to the Cock	Stefan Dimitrov	80 min	Nikolay Binev, Nevena Kokanova, Nikola Todev, Ivan Yanchev	feature film (drama)
Юлия Вревская	Yuliya Vrevskaya	Nikola Korabov		Emilia Radeva, Stefan Danailov, Anatoly Solonitsin	feature film (drama, history)

== 1979 ==
Title	Transliteration / English	Director	Length	Cast	Notes
1979
Бариерата	The Barrier	Christo Christov		Vanya Tsvetkova	Entered into the 11th Moscow International Film Festival
Бедният Лука	Poor Luke	Yakim Yakimov	91 min	Naum Shopov, Katya Paskaleva, Boris Lukanov, Antoni Genov	feature film (drama)
Бумеранг	Boomerang	Ivan Nitchev	112 min	Lyuben Chatalov, Yavor Spassov, Nikolay Binev, Katya Paskaleva	feature film (drama)
Бягай... обичам те	Run ... I love you	Rashko Uzunov	86 min	Stanimir Stoilov, Zoya Kircheva, Nikola Todev, Damyan Antonov	feature film (drama)
Войната на таралежите	War of the Hedgehogs	Ivanka Grabcheva		Dimitar Ganev, Morris Asa, Evgenia Bozhikova, Dimitar Dimitrov	serial movie (comedy, children's film)
Всичко е любов	Everything is Love	Borislav Sharaliev	102 min	Ivan Ivanov, Yanina Kasheva, Valcho Kamarashev, Ibish Orhanov	feature film (drama)
Като белязани атоми	As A Tracer	Grisha Ostrovski	76 min	Stefan Delev, Dimitar Marin, Rumen Dimitrov, Yordan Gadzhev	feature film (drama)
Кратко слънце	Short Sun	Ludmil Kirkov	107 min	Vikhar Stoychev, Rositsa Petrova, Anton Gorchev, Nikola Todev	feature film (drama)
Къщата	The House	Stefan Dimitrov	89 min	Ivan Grigorov, Stanimir Stoilov, Yosif Surchadzhiev, Nikolay Binev	feature film
Лачените обувки на незнайния воин	Lachenite obuvki na neznayniya voin Patent Leather Shoes of the Unknown Soldier	Rangel Vulchanov	85 min	Slavka Ankova, Emilia Marinska, Ivan Stoichkov, Borislav Tsankov	feature film (drama)
Ленко	Lenko	Vasil Mirchev	110 min	Plamen Hristov, Elka Bantulova, Dosyo Dosev, Minka Syuleymezova	feature film (Adventure, Drama)
Мигове в кибритена кутийка	Moments in a Matchbox	Mariana Evstatieva-Biolcheva	86 min	Violeta Doneva, Dosyo Dosev, Leda Taseva, Stefan Danailov	feature film (family)
Момичето и змеят	The Girl and the Dragon	Ilko Dundakov		Mariana Gerova, Miroslav Moravets, Alois Svekhlik, Ivan Tsvetarski	feature film (adventure, fantasy)
От нищо нещо	Something Out of Nothing	Nikola Rudarov	91 min	Asen Kisimov, Stefan Danailov, Aneta Sotirova, Stefan Kostov	feature film (comedy)
Похищението на Савоя	The Abduction of Savoy	Beniamin Dorma	92 min	Darya Mikhailova, Leonid Bronevoy	feature film (adventure, family)
Пътят към София	The Road to Sofia	Nikolai Mashchenko	250 min	Georgi Georgiev-Getzs, Peter Slabakov, Konstantin Tsanev, Pavel Poppandov	5-part serial (war, drama, historical)
Пътник	Pyatnik; The Passenger	Ivan Veselinov			
Роялът	Royal	Borislav Punchev	101 min	Georgi Kaloyanchev, Ivan Grigorov, Georgi Partsalev, Naum Shopov	101 min
Сами сред вълци	Alone Among the Wolves	Zako Heskiya	300 min	Boris Lukanov, Vasil Mikhailov, Stoino Dobrev, Georgi Georgiev-Getz	5-part serial (drama, adventure)
Снимки за спомен	Images of Remembrance	Rumen Surdzhiyski	85 min	Elena Dimitrova, Svetlana Atanasova, Mikhail Mikhailov, Iskra Genkova, Yuriy Yakovlev	feature film (drama)
Строгият от квартал „Акация“	The Tough Neighborhood of Acacia	Nikola Lyubomirov		Dosyo Dosev, Tatyana Alexandrova, Ivan Yordanov, Dimitar Bochev	feature film (drama)
Тайфуни с нежни имена	Typhoons with Tender Names	Milen Getov	160 min	Kosta Tsonev, Anya Pencheva, Liliana Kovacheva, Kliment Denchev	3-part serial (criminal)
Фаталната запетая	Fatal Places	Liliana Pencheva		Georgi Kadurin, Luba Alexieva	
Фильо и Макензен	Filyo and Makenzen	Dimitar Petrov, Vladislav Ikonomov		Yavor Milushev, Veljo Goranov, Georgi Rusev	
Хора и богове	People and Gods			Lubomir Kabakchiev, Yanina Kasheva, Aneta Sotirova, Assen Milanov	TV series
Черешова градина	The Cherry Orchard	Ivan Andonov		Domna Ganeva, Vasil Tsonev, Stoyan Gadev, Nadya Todorova	
