= Cinema of Bulgaria =

- No. of screens: 226 (2018)
  - Per capita: 2.1 per 100,000 (2011)
- Main distributors: Alexandra 36.7% Forum Film 35.9% A Plus Films 9.8%

Produced feature films (2011)
- Fictional: 9 (60.0%)
- Documentary: 6 (40.0%)

Number of admissions (2011)
- Total: 4,722,740
  - Per capita: 0.6 (2012)
- National films: 668,711 (14.2%)

Gross box office (2011)
- Total: 36.7 million лв.
- National films: 4.36 million лв. (11.9%)

Bulgaria has been producing films since 1915. Bulgarian cinema is known for the pioneering work of directors like Donyo Donev in the field of animation. The filming and screening of Vasil Gendov's film Bulgaran is Gallant (1915) is considered to be the beginning of Bulgarian cinematography. Historically, Bulgarian films have been noted for their realism, social themes and technical innovation.

From 1915 to 1948, when film production was nationalized, 55 films were made, but production slowed down after the beginning of World War II. During the time of the Fatherland Front government, films with a historical focus were given bigger funding. The biggest studio at that time was the Boyana Film Studio.

Notable Bulgarian film directors are Rangel Vulchanov, Christo Christov, and Georgi Djulgerov. Other filmmakers of note are Kristina Grozeva and Petar Valchanov, who directed the Crystal Globe-winning film The Father (2019), and Theodore Ushev whose film Blind Vaysha (2016) was nominated for an Academy Award. Bulgarian actors who have accrued critical success and worldwide recognition include Nina Dobrev and Maria Bakalova.

The Golden Rose Film Festival was first held in 1961 and was the biggest Bulgarian film festival throughout the 20th century. In 1997, the Sofia Film Fest was held for the first time. In 2007, Variety included it in its list of the 50 best film festivals.

== Directors ==
See List of Bulgarian film directors

== Actors ==
See also List of Bulgarian actors

- Stefan Valdobrev
- Nikolay Binev
- Stoyan Bachvarov
- Rusi Chanev
- Georgi Cherkelov
- Stefan Danailov
- Nina Dobrev
- Itzhak Fintzi
- Georgi Georgiev-Getz
- Anton Gorchev
- Kiril Gospodinov
- Stanislav Ianevski
- Georgi Kaloyanchev
- Velko Kanev
- Apostol Karamitev
- Asen Kisimov
- Nevena Kokanova
- Todor Kolev
- Konstantin Kotsev
- Tatyana Lolova
- Georgi Mamalev
- Hristo Mutafchiev
- Stoyanka Mutafova
- Lyubomir Neikov
- Dimitar Panov
- Georgi Partsalev
- Katya Paskaleva
- Pavel Popandov
- Petar Popyordanov
- Georgi Rusev
- Krastyu Sarafov
- Yosif Sarchadzhiev
- Hristo Shopov
- Naum Shopov
- Petar Slabakov
- Nikola Todev
- Kosta Tsonev
- Grigor Vachkov
- Martina Vachkova
- Ani Valchanova
- Philip Trifonoff
- Maria Bakalova
- Nick Stanchev

== Animators ==
- Donyo Donev

== Festivals ==
- Sofia International Film Festival
- In The Palace International Short Film Festival
- Sofia Documentary
- Cinelibri

== Notable films ==
- (1910) Bulgaran is Gallant - The Bulgarian is Gallant (considered the first Bulgarian movie)
- (1917) Baronat - Baronet
- (1917) Lyubovta e ludost - The Love is Crazy
- (1921) Dyavolat v Sofia - The Devil in Sofia
- (1922) Bay Ganyo - Bay Ganyo
- (1929) Nai-vyarnata strazha - The Most Loyal Guard
- (1958) Lyubimetz 13 - Favourite #13
- (1962) Tyutyun - Tobacco (nominated for a Golden Palm award at the Cannes Film Festival in 1963)
- (1964) Kradetzat Na Praskovi - The Peach-Garden Trespasser
- (1970) Kit - Whale
- (1970) Bash Maystorat - The Past-Master
- (1972) Kozijat Rog - The Goat Horn
- (1973) Prebroyavane na Divite Zaytsi - The Hare Census
- (1973) Siromashko Lyato - Indian Summer
- (1974) Selyaninat s Koleloto - A Peasant on a Bicycle
- (1975) Osadeni Dushi - Doomed Souls
- (1975) Svatbite na Ivan Asen - The Weddings of King Ivan Assen
- (1976) Shturets v Uhoto - A Cricket in the Ear
- (1976) Dva Dioptara Dalekogledstvo - Farsighted for Two Diopters
- (1978) Toplo - Warmth
- (1980) Dami Kanyat - Ladies Choice
- (1981) Asparuh - Khan Asparoukh
- (1981) Orkestar bez ime - A Nameless Band
- (1983) Gospodin za Edin Den - King for a Day
- (1984) Opasen Char - Dangerous Charm
- (1988) Vreme na nasilie - Time of Violence
- (1988) Vchera - Yesterday
- (2001) Pismo do Amerika - Letter to America
- (2001) Opashkata Na Diavola - Devil's Tail
- (2004) Mila ot Mars - Mila from Mars
- (2005) Otkradnati Ochi - Stolen Eyes
- (2006) Razsledvane - Investigation
- (2008) Dzift - Zift
- (2010) Misiya London - Mission London
- (2010) HDSP: Lov na drebni hishtnici - HDSP: Hunting down small predators
- (2011) Tilt - TILT
- (2012) Sofia's Last Ambulance
- (2014) The Lesson (2014 Bulgarian film)
- (2014) The sinking of Sozopol
- (2015) The Girl From The Vile Land - Момичето от НиЗката Земя
- (2015) 11"А"
- (2016) Slava - Glory
- (2016) Singing shoes-Пеещите обувки
- (2016) Holidaymakers (2016 Bulgarian film) -Летовници
- (2016) Voevoda (2016 Bulgarian film)-Воевода
- (2017) Elevation (2017 Bulgarian film)-Възвишение
- (2017) The Omnipresent (2017 Bulgarian film)-Въздесъщият
- (2017) 12"A"
- (2017) Radiogram (2017 Bulgarian film)-Радиограмофон
- (2017) NoOne (2017 Bulgarian film)-Никой
- (2018) All she wrote (2018 Bulgarian film)-Всичко което тя написа
- (2018) Revolution X (2018 Bulgarian film)-Революция X
- (2020) Yatagan (2020 Bulgarian film)-ЯТАГАН

== See also ==
- Cinema of the world
- History of cinema
- List of famous Bulgarians
- Sofia International Film Festival
- World cinema
