= List of Bulgarian film directors =

The following is a list of Bulgarian film directors.

Name	Born	Died	Comments
Stephen C. Apostolof	1928	2005	
Ivan Andonov	1934	2011	
Metodi Andonov	1932	1974	
Hacho Boyadzhiev	1932	2012	
Christo Christov	1926	2007	
Todor Dinov	1919	2004	
Georgi Djulgerov	1943		
Slatan Dudow	1903	1963	
Vasil Gendov	1891	1970	
Zako Heskija	1922	2006	
Tonislav Hristov	1978		
Stilian Ivanov	1968		
Lyudmil Kirkov	1933	1995	
Nevena Kokanova	1938	2000	
Stephan Komandarev	1966		
Nikola Korabov	1928	2016	
Plamen Maslarov	1950	2010	
Vladimir Nenov	1977		
Ivan Nitchev	1940		
Vladimir Petrov	1896	1966	
Vulo Radev	1923	2001	
Sevda Shishmanova	1962		
Ivaylo Simidchiev	1970		
Ludmil Staikov	1937		
Petar B. Vasilev-Milevin	1918	2001	
Rangel Vulchanov	1928	2013	
Angel Wagenstein	1922	2023	
Eduard Zahariev	1938	1996	
Zahari Zhandov	1911	1998	
Binka Zhelyazkova	1923	2011	First Bulgarian woman to direct a feature film
