= Yuriy Yakovlev (Bulgarian actor) =

Bulgarian actor (1930–2002)

Yuriy Yakovlev Юрий Яковлев
- Yuriy Yakovlev in Farsighted for Two Diopters (1976)
- Born: Yuriy Yurievich Yakovlev; October 5, 1930; Riga, Latvia
- Died: August 15, 2002 (aged 71); Sofia, Bulgaria
- Occupations: Film and Stage Actor
- Years active: 1955–2000

Yuriy Yakovlev (Bulgarian: Юрий Яковлев; 5 October 1930 – 15 August 2002) was a Bulgarian stage and film actor.

He is probably best known for the role of the research worker Robespier Galabov portrayed by him in the Bulgarian hit movie The Past-Master (1970). His character appears also in the sequels The Past-Master on Excursion (1980) and The Past-Master at the Seaside (1982). Other notable film appearances include Gerlovo Event (1971) directed by Grisha Ostrovski and Farsighted for Two Diopters (1976) written by Mormarevi Brothers. Yakovlev is also known for the numerous roles on the stage of the Theatre “Salza i Smyah” (Tear and Laughter), Sofia.

In 1979, Yuriy Yakovlev was decorated with the high title “Honoured Artist”.

== Biography and career ==
Yakovlev was born Yuriy Yurievich Yakovlev on October 5, 1930 in Riga, Latvia. His father Yuriy Dimitrievich Yakovlev, also actor and stage director, was of Russian descent. His mother Jeana Sladkarova - Yakovleva was a well known Bulgarian opera singer. Her brother Angel Sladkarov was among the founders of the operetta genre in Bulgaria. The first appearance on the stage of the young Yuriy Yurievich was at the age of 7 in a staging at Ivan Vazov National Theatre directed by his father. In 1955-56, after the graduation from The National Academy for Theatre and Film Arts, Yakovlev junior was appointed in the Pernik Theatre for a year. Between 1956 and 1966, he played with the so-called “Working Front Theatre” and “People's Stage Theatre”. In 1967, Yakovlev joined the troupe of the newly founded theatre “Salza i Smyah” (Tear and Laughter), Sofia where he remained until his retirement from the stage in 1992.

== Filmography ==
Year	Film			Role	Notes
Year	English title	Bulgarian title	Transliteration	Role	Notes
1970	The Past-Master	Баш майсторът	Bash Maystorat	Robespier Galabov	directed by Petar B. Vasilev
1971	Gerlovo Event	Герловска история	Gerlovska istoriya	Bay Vasil	directed by Grisha Ostrovski
1972	Hitchhiking	Автостоп	Avtostop	Bay Tanas	
1972	A Human Heart	Сърце човешко	Sartse choveshko	Dr. Rusev	
1974	Dawn Over the Drava	Зарево над Драва	Zarevo nad Drava		directed by Zako Heskiya
1974	A Peasant on a Bicycle	Селянинът с колелото	Selyaninat s koleloto	Maglena's father	directed by Lyudmil Kirkov
1976	Farsighted for Two Diopters	Два диоптъра далекогледство	Dva dioptara dalekogledstvo	the lawyer	directed by Petar B. Vasilev
1979	Snapshots as Souvenirs	Снимки за спомен	Snimki za spomen	Nikolina's father	
1980	The Past-Master on Excursion	Баш майсторът на екскурзия	Bash maystorat na ekskurziya	Robespier Galabov	directed by Petar B. Vasilev
1983	To the Miss and Her Male Company	За госпожицата и нейната мъжка компания	Za gospozhitsata i neynata mazhka kompaniya	the public prosecutor Drenski	
1984	Question of Time	Събеседник по желание	Sabesednik po zhelanie	Kosta	
