= Evstati Stratev =

Bulgarian actor

Evstati Stratev Евстати Стратев
- Evstati Stratev in The Hare Census (1973)
- Born: February 11, 1934; Shumen, Bulgaria
- Died: November 22, 1984 (aged 50); Sofia, Bulgaria
- Occupations: Film and Theatre Actor
- Years active: 1959–1984

Evstati Stratev (Bulgarian: Евстати Стратев) was a Bulgarian stage and film actor born in 1934, deceased in 1984.

He is best known for the colourful supporting characters that he portrayed in the Bulgarian cinema, until his untimely death in 1984, most notably the village school teacher in The Hare Census (1973), the fellow countryman in A Peasant on a Bicycle (1974) and the correspondence student in Villa Zone (1975).

== Selected filmography ==
Year	Film			Role	Notes
Year	Bulgarian title	Transliteration	English title	Role	Notes
1968	Шведските крале	Shvedskite krale	The Swedish Kings	Goran	director: Lyudmil Kirkov
1970	Кит	Kit	Whale	the boat sailing superior	Director: Petar B. Vasilev
1971	Гола съвест	Gola savest	Naked Conscience	the investigator	
1971	Герловска история	Gerlovska istoriya	Gerlovo Event	the old man	director: Grisha Ostrovski
1972	Момчето си отива	Momcheto si otiva	The Boy Turns Man	Ran' father	director: Lyudmil Kirkov
1973	Сиромашко лято	Siromashko lyato	Indian Summer	police inspector Dobrev	written by Mormarevi Brothers
1973	Преброяване на дивите зайци	Prebroyavane na divite zaytsi	The Hare Census	the village school teacher	director: Eduard Zahariev
1974	Селянинът с колелото	Selyaninat s koleloto	A Peasant on a Bicycle	the fellow countryman	director: Lyudmil Kirkov
1974	Последният ерген	Posledniyat ergen	The Last Bachelor	Sachkov	
1974	Криворазбраната цивилизация	Krivorazbranata tsivilizatsiya	The Phoney Civilization	Maystor Stanyu, the Mityu's father.	TV musical directed by Hacho Boyadzhiev
1975	Вилна зона	Wilna Zona	Villa Zone	the correspondence student	director: Eduard Zahariev
1976	Щурец в ухото	Shturets v uhoto	A Cricket in the Ear	Evtim' brother	
1977	Матриархат	Matriarhat	Matriarchy	the inspector	director: Lyudmil Kirkov
