= Slabakov =

Slabakov (Bulgarian: Слабаков), female Slabakova, is a Bulgarian surname. Notable people with the surname include:

- Andrei Slabakov (born 1960), Bulgarian actor, film director, and screenwriter
- Peter Slabakov (1923–2009), Bulgarian actor
- Roumyana Slabakova, linguist
