= List of submissions to the 44th Academy Awards for Best Foreign Language Film =

1971 Best Foreign Language Film submissions

Highlights
- Oscar winner: (Italy) The Garden of the Finzi-Continis
- Submissions: 20
- Debuts: 2

This is a list of submissions to the 44th Academy Awards for Best Foreign Language Film. The Academy Award for Best Foreign Language Film was created in 1956 by the Academy of Motion Picture Arts and Sciences to honour non-English-speaking films produced outside the United States. The award is handed out annually, and is accepted by the winning film's director, although it is considered an award for the submitting country as a whole. Countries are invited by the Academy to submit their best films for competition according to strict rules, with only one film being accepted from each country.

For the 44th Academy Awards, twenty films were submitted in the category Academy Award for Best Foreign Language Film. Bulgaria and Canada submitted films for consideration for the first time. Japanese filmmaker Akira Kurosawa gained his first nomination for the award (although he had received an honorary award at the 24th Academy Awards in 1951 for Rashomon) for Dodes'ka-den, a film which was a critical and commercial failure in his native Japan. The five nominated films came from Israel, Italy, Japan, Sweden and the Soviet Union.

Italy won the award for the ninth time with The Garden of the Finzi-Continis by Vittorio De Sica, which was also nominated for Best Screenplay Based on Material from Another Medium.

== Submissions ==
Submitting country	Film title used in nomination	Original title	Language(s)	Director(s)	Result
Brazil	Pra Quem Fica, Tchau		Brazilian Portuguese	Reginaldo Faria	Not nominated
Bulgaria	Porcupines Are Born Without Bristles	Таралежите се раждат без бодли	Bulgarian	Dimitar Petrov	Not nominated
Canada	Mon oncle Antoine		French	Claude Jutra	Not nominated
Denmark	The Missing Clerk	Den forsvundne fuldmægtig	Danish	Gert Fredholm	Not nominated
Egypt	A Woman and a Man	امرأة و رجل	Arabic	Houssam Eddine Mostafa	Not nominated
France	Ramparts of Clay	Remparts d'argile	French, Arabic	Jean-Louis Bertuccelli	Not nominated
West Germany	The Castle	Das Schloß	German	Rudolf Noelte	Not nominated
Hungary	Love	Szerelem	Hungarian, German	Károly Makk	Not nominated
India	Reshma Aur Shera	रेशमा और शेरा	Hindi	Sunil Dutt	Not nominated
Israel	The Policeman	השוטר אזולאי	Hebrew	Ephraim Kishon	Nominated
Italy	The Garden of the Finzi-Continis	Il Giardino dei Finzi-Contini	Italian	Vittorio De Sica	Won Academy Award
Japan	Dodes'ka-den	どですかでん	Japanese	Akira Kurosawa	Nominated
Mexico	El Topo		Spanish	Alejandro Jodorowsky	Not nominated
Netherlands	Mira		Dutch	Fons Rademakers	Not nominated
Poland	Family Life	Życie rodzinne	Polish	Krzysztof Zanussi	Not nominated
Romania	The Last Crusade	Mihai Viteazul	Romanian	Sergiu Nicolaescu	Not nominated
Soviet Union	Tchaikovsky	Чайкoвский	Russian	Igor Talankin	Nominated
Spain	Marta		Spanish	José Antonio Nieves Conde	Not nominated
Sweden	The Emigrants	Utvandrarna	Swedish	Jan Troell	Nominated
Yugoslavia	Black Seed	Црно семе	Macedonian	Kiril Cenevski	Not nominated

== Sources ==
- Margaret Herrick Library, Academy of Motion Picture Arts and Sciences
