= Farsighted for Two Diopters =

- the original poster
- Bulgarian: Два Диоптъра Далекогледство
- Directed by: Petar B. Vasilev
- Written by: Mormarevi Brothers
- Starring: Georgi Partsalev; Dimitar Panov; Sashka Bratanova; Valentin Gadzhokov; Ivan Obretenov
- Cinematography: Yatsek Todorov
- Music by: Petar Stupel
- Production company: SFF / a Film Unite Sredets
- Release date: 1976
- Running time: 89 minutes
- Country: Bulgaria
- Language: Bulgarian

Farsighted for Two Diopters (Bulgarian: Два Диоптъра Далекогледство / Dva Dioptara Dalekogledstvo) is a 1976 Bulgarian comedy film directed by Petar B. Vasilev and written by Mormarevi Brothers. The film stars Georgi Partsalev, Dimitar Panov, Sashka Bratanova, Ivan Obretenov and Valentin Gadzhokov.

The film represents the clash between the generations in the person of the conservative father Dimo Manchev (Partsalev) and his daughter (Bratanova). The accurate examining of real problems are presented spiced with a lot of humour in the typical of Mormarevi plain language and a touch of nostalgia. It is known that the character of Dimo Manchev was specially written and designed for Partsalev.

== Plot ==
Dimo Manchev (Partsalev), a 50-year-old head of family, has a conservative notion of upbringing and morality. Being familiar with his disposition, the Manchev's daughter Lili (Bratanova) married her sweetheart Plamen (Gadzhokov) in secret. The young couple cast about how to announce the marriage all the more that they are both still students studying in university. The hesitation grows when the father shows strictness even though they present their relation as some university friendship. Lili and Plamen find a cordial welcome by the Lili's grandfather and Manchev's father - Old Pano (Panov). The culmination advances when they are caught in the Old Pano's house by the accidentally passing through the village Manchev. Gradually, Dimo Manchev starts accepting their relationship and even become the main (and the only) organizer of the wedding day ceremony. The young couple are horrified at the prospect of some old-fashioned wedding banquet with a great number of guests. They own to having signed and that actually they are already husband and wife. Manchev is devastated but doesn't give up, especially after learning that the Plamen's parents were also initially against this marriage. Being respected dentists in a small town, they look down on Manchev's working-class background. He cannot swallow the insult and declares willingness to take charge of the newly married couple. Finally, there is a happy end the more so as a baby is born and the Old Pano' words remain: "...Dimo, Dimo, they can be without you, but you can't be without them..."

== Cast ==
Character	Actor	Role
Dimo Manchev	Georgi Partsalev	the conservative father
Old Pano	Dimitar Panov	the grandfather
Lili	Sashka Bratanova	the Manchev's daughter
Plamen	Valentin Gadzhokov	the Lili's sweetheart
Spiro	Ivan Obretenov	Manchev's neighbour and colleague
Mila	Valentina Borisova	Manchev's wife
Zhorko	Misho Milchev	Manchev's little son (Lili's brother)
Violeta	Irina Rosich	
	Mariana Alamancheva	the official
	Yuri Yakovlev	the lawyer
	Kiril Gospodinov	the taxi driver
	Violeta Bahchevanova	

== Production ==
After With Children at the Seaside (1972) Mormarevi and Partsalev got to know each other so the "Brothers" designed the character of Dimo Manchev specially for him. Since they gathered together with the well-known master of the comedy Petar B. Vasilev (Whale (1970); The Past-Master (1970)) the prospects for the film were extremely positive. Furthermore, Mormarevi had one more acquaintance here. The cinematographer of Polish origin Yatsek Todorov. They worked together on Exams at Any Odd Time (1974).

The title was taken from a Parcalev's character cue: "...And you should listen to me! Why do you think the elderly people become farsighted? Because they start seeing far away. I got directly two diopters..."

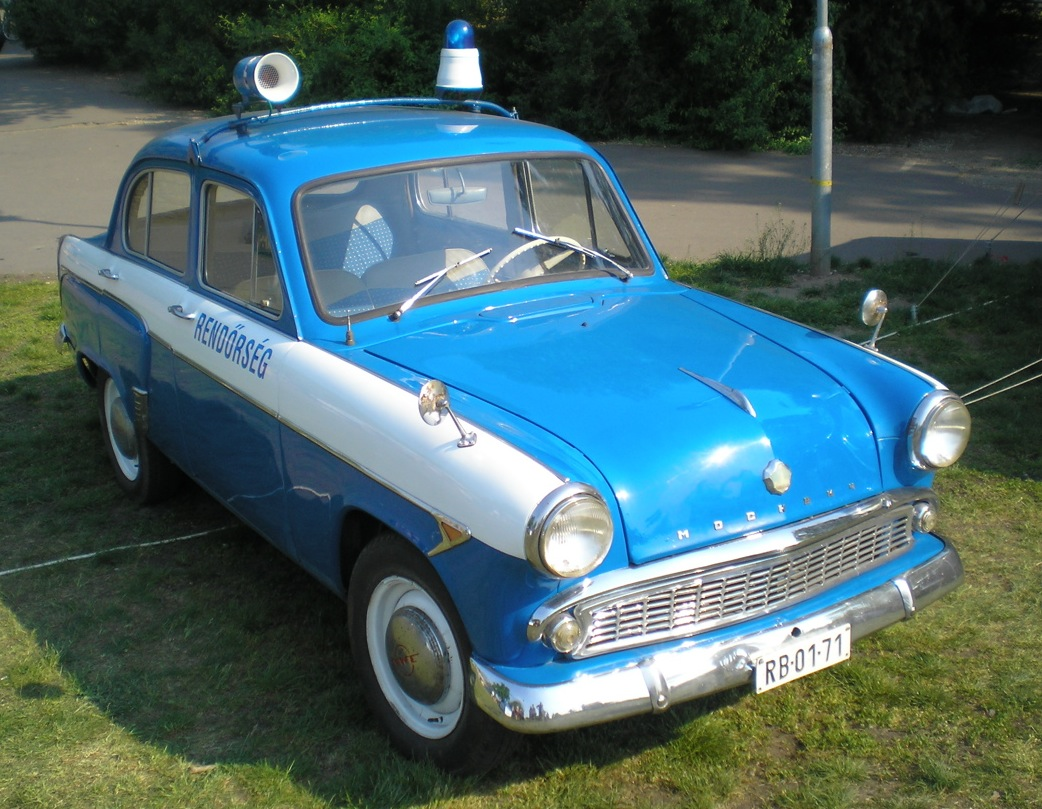
This 1956 model of Moskvich is one of the main "characters" in the film

As usual of Vasilev, the director's wife Valentina Borisova was involved in the film. We can see her as a Manchev's wife Mila. One of the sub-stories in the film is about buying the old car model Moskvitch 402 from Manchev' neighbour and colleague Spiro (Obretenov). The scenes when they test the car, while going to Old Pano's village, are filmed on the road from Sofia to the villages of Bistritsa and Zheleznitsa in Pancharevo suburban district. Curiously, the actor Ivan Obretenov had no driving license and couldn't drive at all. So the car was hooked through a draw-bar to the camera-truck.

== Response ==
A reported 1,725,810 admissions were recorded for the film in cinemas throughout Bulgaria.

The film was subsumed among the 50 golden Bulgarian films in the book by the journalist Pencho Kovachev. The book was published in 2008 by "Zahariy Stoyanov" publishing house.
