= Rumena Trifonova =

Bulgarian film and theatre actress (1944–2025)

- Румена Трифонова
- Trifonova in Porcupines Are Born Without Bristles, 1971
- Born: Rumena Georgieva Trifonova; 18 May 1944; Gabrovo, Bulgaria
- Died: 22 July 2025 (aged 81)
- Education: Krastyo Sarafov National Academy for Theatre and Film Arts
- Occupations: Film and theatre actress

Rumena Georgieva Trifonova (Bulgarian: Румена Георгиева Трифонова; 18 May 1944 – 22 July 2025) was a Bulgarian film and theatre actress. She was known for playing the singing teacher Dilyanska in the 1971 film Porcupines Are Born Without Bristles.

Trifonova appeared in numerous films such as Measure for Measure, The Three Marias and Ivan, The Guardian of the Dead, Return, Death of a Rabbit, With a Dissenting Opinion, Warming Up Yesterday's Lunch and The Grey Zone. She also appeared in theatre plays such as At the Crossroads, Vacation in Arco Iris, Albena and The Prosecutor.

Trifonova died on 22 July 2025, at the age of 81.
