= A Woman and a Man (film) =

1971 film

- Film poster
- Directed by: Houssam Eddine Mostafa
- Starring: Nahed Sherif; Rushdy Abaza
- Release date: 1971
- Running time: 90 minutes
- Country: Egypt
- Language: Arabic

A Woman and a Man (Arabic: امرأة و رجل, translit. Arabic: Imra'ah wa ragoul) is a 1971 Egyptian drama film directed by Houssam Eddine Mostafa. The film was selected as the Egyptian entry for the Best Foreign Language Film at the 44th Academy Awards, but was not accepted as a nominee.

== Cast ==
- Nahed Sherif
- Rushdy Abaza
- Zizi Mostafa

== See also ==
- List of submissions to the 44th Academy Awards for Best Foreign Language Film
- List of Egyptian submissions for the Academy Award for Best Foreign Language Film
