= Dimitar Panov =

Димитър Панов Dimitar Panov
- Born: July 18, 1902; Veliko Tarnovo, Bulgaria
- Died: November 15, 1985 (aged 83); Plovdiv, Bulgaria
- Other name: Bai Pano
- Occupations: Film and Theater Actor; Theater Director
- Years active: 1955–1985

Dimitar Panov (Bulgarian: Димитър Панов; July 18, 1902 – November 15, 1985) was a Bulgarian film and theater actor and director.

== Biography and career ==
With Georgi Partsalev in Whale (1970)

Panov was born on July 18, 1902, in the town of Veliko Tarnovo, Bulgaria. He made his debut in 1955 on the stage of the Plovdiv Theater in Chehov's play Five Small Comedies. He continued to work with this theater, not only as an actor, but also as a director of such plays as Sluzhbogontsi by the eminent Bulgarian writer Ivan Vazov.

At the same time Dimitar Panov collaborated with the Plovdiv Opera where he took part in the operetta "The Bat" by Strauss and in the opera "The Beautiful Helen" by Offenbach.

His cinematic debut was in 1960 in the film The Road Is Going Through Belovir, written by Pavel Vezhinov and directed by Petar B. Vasilev. In the film we can see Apostol Karamitev in the leading role of the engineer Petrov.

His autobiography The Life is Only One was published in 1983.
Panov died in 1985 at the age of 83.

== Filmography ==
| Year | Title | Role | Notes |
|---|---|---|---|
| 1960 | Patyat Minava prez Belovir | Bay Petko | Bulgarian: Пътят минава през Беловир |
| 1961 | A Byahme Mladi | | Bulgarian: А бяхме млади |
| 1961 | Krayat na Patya | | Bulgarian: Краят на пътя |
| 1961 | Stramnata Pateka | Bay Mihal | Bulgarian: Стръмната пътека |
| 1963 | Inspektorat i Noshtta | the forensic physician | Bulgarian: Инспекторът и нощта |
| 1964 | Priklyuchenie v Polunosht | Nastev | Bulgarian: Приключение в полунощ |
| 1965 | Do Grada e Blizo | | Bulgarian: До града е близо |
| 1965 | Parolata | | Bulgarian: Паролата |
| 1965 | Goreshto Pladne | | Bulgarian: Горещо пладне |
| 1966 | The Fountain of Love | Lars Pogge | Austria production |
| 1967 | V Kraya na Lyatoto | | Bulgarian: В края на лятото |
| 1968 | Gibelta na Aleksander Veliki | the night guard | Bulgarian: Гибелта на Александър Велики |
| 1969 | Ikonostasat | | Bulgarian: Иконостасът |
| 1969 | Osmiyat | the old man | Bulgarian: Осмият |
| 1970 | Kit | Kalcho Kalchev | Bulgarian: Кит |
| 1970 | Edin mig svoboda | the old man | Bulgarian: Един миг свобода |
| 1970 | Knyazat | the old boyar | Bulgarian: Князът |
| 1971 | Taralezhite se razhdat bez bodli | the grandfather who lives alone | Bulgarian: Таралежите се раждат без бодли |
| 1972 | Glutnitsata | Kotse, the shepherd | Bulgarian: Глутницата |
| 1972 | Tihiyat Begletz | Old Petko | Bulgarian: Тихият беглец |
| 1974 | Na zhivot i smart | | TV movie Bulgarian: На живот и смърт |
| 1976 | Dva Dioptara Dalekogledstvo | Old Pano | Bulgarian: Два диоптъра далекогледство |
| 1977 | Unterwegs nach Atlantis | Patrokleos | East Germany production |
| 1978 | 100 tona shtastie | | Bulgarian: 100 тона щастие |
| 1978 | Instrument li e Gaydata? | | Bulgarian: Инструмент ли е гайдата? |
| 1979 | Lenko | Palamudov's father | Bulgarian: Ленко |
| 1979 | Ot nishto neshto | | Bulgarian: От нищо нещо |
| 1980 | Mozhe bi fregata | Old Petko | Bulgarian: Може би фрегата |
| 1980 | Noshtnite bdeniya na pop Vecherko | Bay Dimitar | Bulgarian: Нощните бдения на поп Вечерко |
| 1981 | A nu-ka, dedushki! | | co-production Bulgaria, Soviet Union |
| 1982 | Bash Maystorat na More | | TV movie sequel of The Past-Master; Bulgarian: Баш Майсторът на море |
| 1986 | Vasko de Gama ot selo Rupcha | | TV series Bulgarian: Васко де Гама от село Рупча |
