= Porcupines Are Born Without Bristles =

1971 film

- Directed by: Dimitar Petrov
- Written by: Bratya Mormarevi
- Produced by: Kiril S. Kirov
- Starring: Ivaylo Dzhambazov
- Cinematography: Krum Krumov
- Release date: 7 January 1971
- Running time: 84 minutes
- Country: Bulgaria
- Language: Bulgarian

Porcupines Are Born Without Bristles (Bulgarian: Таралежите се раждат без бодли, translit. Taralezhite se razhdat bez bodli, and also known as Hedgehogs Are Born Without Spines) is a 1971 Bulgarian comedy film directed by Dimitar Petrov. It was entered into the 1972 Melbourne International Film Festival. The film was selected as the Bulgarian entry for the Best Foreign Language Film at the 44th Academy Awards, but was not accepted as a nominee.

== Cast ==
- Ivaylo Dzhambazov as Tedi
- Neyko Neykov as Koko
- Petar Peychev as Denbi
- Andrey Slabakov as Kancho
- Ivan Arshinkov as Nasko
- Dimitar Tzonev as Mitko
- Sarkis Muhibyan as Bay Tanas
- Rumena Trifonova as Uchitelkata po peene Dilyanska
- Dimitar Panov as Dyadoto, koyto zhivee sam
- Nikolay Doychev as Dyadoto na Koko
- Vasil Stoychev as Klasniyat Penev
- Zlatina Doncheva as Maykata na Kancho
- Domna Ganeva as Maykata na Nasko

== See also ==
- List of submissions to the 44th Academy Awards for Best Foreign Language Film
- List of Bulgarian submissions for the Academy Award for Best Foreign Language Film
