= With Children at the Seaside =

- Original title: С деца на море
- Directed by: Dimitar Petrov
- Written by: Mormarevi Brothers
- Starring: Georgi Partsalev; Petar Peychev; Ivaylo Dzhambazov
- Cinematography: Krum Krumov
- Music by: Petar Stupel
- Distributed by: Bulgarian Cinematography; Studio of Featured Films; Film Unite Hemus
- Release date: 17 November 1972
- Running time: 80 minutes
- Country: Bulgaria
- Language: Bulgarian

With Children at the Seaside (Bulgarian: С деца на море, romanized: S detsa na more) is a Bulgarian anthology comedy film released in 1972, directed by Dimitar Petrov, starring Georgi Partsalev, Petar Peychev and Ivaylo Dzhambazov. The screenplay is written by Mormarevi Brothers.

The movie consists of two separated stories that are bound by the theme about the summer seaside vacation as well as by the character of the plump teenager Pipsi. This is the second film of the "Childhood series" by Mormarevi Brothers, featuring children's characters in the main parts.

The first segment is named The Dolphin, starring mostly children led by the witty plump teenager Pipsi (Petar Peychev). The kids are obsessed by the story about a mysterious dolphin insinuated by a local fisherman and playboy who tries to tie affair with the elder sister of one of them. The second segment is named The Amateur Photographer, starring one of the leading Bulgarian comic actors, Georgi Partsalev, in the role of uncle Mancho, an aging man who flirts with a young female colleague during a pseudo business trip at the seaside. Unfortunately for them, they are accidentally photographed by the same teenager Pipsi (Petar Peychev) who turns out to be a neighbor of uncle Mancho.

As usual for the films written by Mormarevi Brothers, With Children at the Seaside obtained wide popularity and became one of the classic Bulgarian comedies from the 1970s.

== Cast ==
Segment 1 - The Dolphin

In the roles of the children are:

- Petar Peychev as Pipsi
- Ivaylo Dzhambazov as Ivaylo
- Kiril Petrov as Kircho
- Ivan Arshinkov as Ivan
- Emil Petrov as Emil
- Krasimir Marianov as Krasimir
- Ruslan Terziyski as Ruslan
- Svetlana Krumova as Svetlana

In the roles of the adults are:

- Mihail Mutafov as Ognyan, the local fisherman
- Tatyana Novoselska as Elena, Ruslan's elder sister
- Zlatina Dzhambazova
- Krastyu Doynov

Segment 2 - The Amateur Photographer

In the roles of the children are:

- Petar Peychev as Pipsi
- Kiril Petrov as Kircho

In the roles of the adults are:

- Georgi Partsalev as uncle Mancho
- Margarita Stefanova
- Svetoslav Peev
- Renata Kiselichka
