= Kiril Gospodinov =

Bulgarian actor (1934–2003)

Кирил Господинов Kiril Gospodinov
- actor
- Born: 24 May 1934; Grozdyovo village, Varna, Bulgaria
- Died: 24 April 2003 (aged 68); Varna, Bulgaria
- Occupations: Film and Theater Actor
- Years active: 1966–1991

Kiril Ivanov Gospodinov (Bulgarian: Кирил Иванов Господинов) (1934–2003) was a Bulgarian theater and film actor. His acting created one of the eminent characters in the Bulgarian film art.

== Biography and career ==
Gospodinov was born on 24 May 1934 in Grozdyovo village, Varna Province. After graduating as an actor in The National Academy for Theatre and Film Arts in 1966, he started working with the Varna Theater where he stayed for five years. In 1971 he moved to Sofia to work with the Sofia Theater.

The first films featuring him are Ponedelnik sutrin / Monday Morning (1966) and The Swedish Kings (1968). In 1970 the Bulgarian National Television released the TV film Bash Maystorat / The Past-Master with Kiril Gospodinov in the leading role as Rangel Lelin-the past-master. This satirical comedy turned him and his character in "Trade Mark" for the Bulgarian film art. The film had four more sequels throughout the years. Generations have identified Gospodinov as The Past-Master till nowadays.

Another landmark in his career, apart from the past-master roles, turned out to be the film Three Reservists. Released in 1971, the film won numerous awards in the Varna Film Festival one of which was for Gospodinov's leading role .

He continued filming as well as performing on the stage of the theater during the next two decades leaving fadeless trail with his roles such as his remarkable performance in the film classic from 1972 - The Boy Turns Man. In 1984 he was decorated with the high government prize the Order Of Saint Cyril And Saint Methodius.

The miserable economic and culture conditions in the country during the 1990s had an awful effect on the film industry as well as on the actors living standard.

Gospodinov died in 2003 at the age of 69.

== Filmography ==
Year	Film	Role	Notes
1966	Ponedelnik Sutrin / Monday Morning	Aleksi	Released 1988. Bulgarian: Понеделник сутрин
1968	Shvedskite Krale / The Swedish Kings	Spas	Bulgarian: Шведските крале
1968	Sluchayat Penleve / The Penleve Case		Bulgarian: Случаят Пенлеве
1969	Svoboda ili Smart / Freedom or Death	Ivanitsa	Bulgarian: Свобода или смърт
1969	Ptitsi i Hratki / Birds and Greyhounds	Nikifor	Bulgarian: Птици и хрътки
1969	Armando		Bulgarian: Армандо
1970	Bash Maystorat / The Past-Master	Rangel Lelin - the past-master	TV film Bulgarian: Баш Майсторът
1971	Ne se Obrashtay Nazad / Don't Turn Back	the captain	Bulgarian: Не се обръщай назад
1971	Trimata ot Zapasa / Three Reservists	Spiro Stoimenov	Won Best Actor in a Leading Role (Golden Rose Film Fest); Bulgarian: Тримата от запаса
1972	Glutnitsata / The Pack of Wolves	Cherniya	Bulgarian: Глутницата
1972	Momcheto Si Otiva / The Boy Turns Man	Filip K. Filipov (Tinka's husband)	Bulgarian: Момчето си отива
1972	Treta Sled Slantseto / Third After the Sun	Het	Bulgarian: Трета след слънцето
1972	Vyatarat na Pateshestviyata / Tail Wind		Bulgarian: Вятърът на пътешествията
1973	Kato Pesen / Like a Song	the bridegroom	Bulgarian: Като песен
1975	Viza za Okeana / Visa for the Ocean	the boatswain	Bulgarian: Виза за Океана
1975	Nezabravimiyat Den / The Memorable Day		Bulgarian: Незабравимият ден
1976	Ne Si Otivay! / Don't Go Away	Tinka's husband	sequel of The Boy Turns Man; Bulgarian: Не си отивай!
1976	Dva Dioptara Dalekogledstvo / Farsighted for Two Diopters	the taxi driver	Bulgarian: Два диоптъра далекогледство
1977	Hora otdaleche / People from Afar	Kosta	Bulgarian: Хора отдалече
1977	Chetvartoto izmerenie / The Fourth Dimension	Georgi	TV series Bulgarian: Четвъртото измерение
1977	Slanchev udar / Sunstroke	Bai Lyubo	Bulgarian: Слънчев удар
1978	100 tona shtastie / One Hundred Tons of Happiness		Bulgarian: 100 тона щастие
1978	Panteley		Bulgarian: Пантелей
1979	Kratko slantze / Short Sun	Ganev	Bulgarian: Кратко слънце
1980	Bash Maystorat na ekskurziya / The Past-Master on the Excursion	Rangel Lelin - the past-master	sequel of The Past-Master; Bulgarian: Баш майсторът на екскурзия
1980	Wonny		Bulgarian: Уони
1981	Bash Maystorat fermer / The Past-Master-Farmer	Rangel Lelin - the past-master	sequel of The Past-Master; Bulgarian: Баш Майсторът фермер
1982	Bash Maystorat na More / The Past-Master at the Seaside	Rangel Lelin - the past-master	sequel of The Past-Master; Bulgarian: Баш Майсторът на море
1983	Pochti reviziya / Almost an Inspection	Kosta	TV mini-series Bulgarian: Почити ревизия
1983	Bash Maystorat nachalnik / The Past-Master - Boss	Rangel Lelin - the past-master	sequel of The Past-Master; Bulgarian: Баш Майсторът началник
1983	Bon shans, inspektore! / Bonne Chance, Inspector!	Trifon	Bulgarian: Бон шанс, инспекторе!
1984	Stenata / The Dam		Bulgarian: Стената
1987	Petak vecher / Friday Night	the boss Zhelyazoto	Bulgarian: Петък вечер
1988	Ponedelnik Sutrin / Monday Morning	Aleksi	Filmed 1966, Released 1988; Bulgarian: Понеделник сутрин
1988	Izlozhenie / Report		Bulgarian: Изложение
1990	Karnavalat / The Carnival	a person in charge of the health service	Bulgarian: Карнавалът
1991	Veshtestveno dokazatelstvo / Material Evidence	the mayor	Bulgarian: Веществено доказателство
1991	O, Gospodi, kade si? / Oh, My Lord, Where Art Thee?	the pharmacist	Bulgarian: О, Господи, къде си?
1996	Traka-Trak / Tap-Tap		Bulgarian: Трака-трак
2004	Drugiyat nash vazmozhen zhivot / The Other Possible Life of Ours	the father	Bulgarian: Другият наш възможен живот
