= Mormarevi Brothers =

Bulgarian writer duo

Mormarevi Brothers Братя Мормареви
- Moritz Yomtov (left) and Marko Stoychev
- Born: Moritz Yomtov; 5 November 1921 (Sofia, Bulgaria); Marko Stoychev; 12 September 1931 (Varna, Bulgaria)
- Died: Moritz Yomtov; 15 June 1992 (Israel); Marko Stoychev; 20 January 2006 (Sofia, Bulgaria)
- Occupations: Writers, Screenwriters
- Writing career
- Period: 1964-1990
- Genres: Childhood, Comedy

Mormarevi Brothers (Bulgarian: Братя Мормареви / Bratya Mormarevi) is the joint pen name of Moritz Yomtov (Bulgarian: Мориц Йомтов) and Marko Stoychev (Bulgarian: Марко Стойчев) - two Bulgarian authors of humorous prose and screenplays. They worked from the 1960s until the end of the 1980s. The two were longtime friends but not actually brothers.

The first part of their pen name was created from the first three letters of their given names. The second part was probably inspired by the Brothers Grimm. They specialized in humorous films for children, but also wrote humor for adults. Their screenplays became classic films, fondly remembered to this day by Bulgarians, young and old.

Their filmed screenplays also featured Bulgarian comic actors of this period, including Dimitar Panov in Porcupines Are Born Without Spines (1971) and Georgi Partsalev in With Children at the Seaside (1972) and Farsighted for Two Diopters (1976). They created a body of work during a productive era in Bulgarian cinematography.

== Biography ==
Moritz Yomtov was born on 5 November 1921 in Sofia, Bulgaria. He graduated from the American College of Sofia and afterwards studied chemistry. His friends described him as a man of brilliant erudition and a person of encyclopedic knowledge. He had a professorship in biochemistry but also had a great interest in jokes and the humorous stories. Yomtov held high posts in the Federation of European Biochemical Societies for years, finally reaching the position of secretary-general. Aside from his native Bulgarian, he spoke English, French, German and Russian. Moritz Yomtov died in 1992 in Israel at the age of 71.

Marko Stoychev was born on 12 September 1931 in Varna, Bulgaria. When he was a child, his family moved to Sofia, where he spent his entire life. Stoychev graduated with a degree in English philology from Sofia University. In 1953, he went to work for Bulgarian National Radio, where he worked in the Foreign Broadcasts department. After several years working there, he met Yomtov. They became inseparable friends for the rest of their lives. Marko Stoychev died in 2006 at the age of 75.

== Writing career ==
=== The beginning ===
"I cannot think if I'm not behind the typewriter."

— Marko Stoychev, on his creative habits.

Mormarevi Brothers started their collaboration writing feuilletons for Starshel (Hornet) newspaper, a Bulgarian weekly paper of humour and satire. Their work method was to sit down at a table in Yomtov's small kitchen and figure out subjects and characters while playing cards. Afterwards, they would alternate on the typewriter, but often Stoychev did more of this work.

"They both were crazy about Bulgarian yellow cheese. Engrossed in play and creation, they sometimes ate pounds of it."

— Kancho Stoychev (Marko's son), on their working habits.

Anzhel Vagenshtain was their discoverer for the cinema. After reading their feuilletons in Starshel, he told them that they should write a comedy. As a joke, they sat down and wrote the screenplay for The Ancient Coin. This led to the first Bulgarian musical film, a 1965 co-production with East Germany. The then-fashionable Bulgarian singer Liana Antonova and the East German film star Manfred Krug appeared in the film. The music was by Bulgarian composer Petar Stupel.

This first film was followed by a five-year break, caused, at least in part, by Stoychev's dismissal from Bulgarian National Radio after an incident involving the unauthorized radio broadcast, not long after the 1968 Prague Spring, of a satirical poem by the eminent Bulgarian poet Valery Petrov.

=== The childhood series ===
"We write stories for adults but with very very young actors in the leading roles. Then it turned out that they were children's films as defined by the critics. We accept it with pleasure because the children are the most spontaneous and sincere kind of audience."

— Mormarevi Brothers, on their childhood series.

Mormarevi Brothers declared that they never had intentions to write about children. As writers, they always searched for the funny parts of everyday life. They found it in the child's point of view on the world, but their writing was spiced with a lot of humour that could also be appreciated by adults, and even with some satire.

In 1971, their second filmed screenplay, named Porcupines Are Born Without Spines, was released. This was the first film in a series that came to be known as "Childhood". Inspired by children and their laughter, they produced a series of memorable films with similar themes. They were: With Children at the Seaside (1972), Exams at Any Odd Time (1974), Problem with Many Unknown Quantities (1977) and The Porcupines' War (1979). The first three films in this series used a formula of two separate plotlines in a film. All these films found an enormous audience.

"A film with horses, my brother, is not about the horses."

— Marko Stoychev, when asked if their stories were for kids.

By the end of the 1970s, the Brothers reached the apogee of their fame with the story The Porcupines' War. It was filmed and subsequently released as a TV miniseries, which was viewed by nearly everyone living in Bulgaria at the time. The same can be said for Vasko de Gama from Rupcha Village, another extremely successful film based on a Mormarevi screenplay, released as TV miniseries in 1986.

In these films, the narration unfolds without artificial pacing. The children were encouraged to play themselves rather than act out characters. With their Childhood series, the Mormarevi Brothers contributed to Bulgarian cinematography during the 1970s and 1980s, creating films intended for both children and general audiences.

=== Adult comedies genre ===
Dimitar Panov (left) and Georgi Partsalev in Farsighted for Two Diopters (1976)

Aside from the Childhood series, three other very popular Bulgarian films were also filmed from their screenplays. They are: Indian Summer (1973), Farsighted for Two Diopters (1976) and The Double (1980). After their first two "Childhood" films, Indian Summer seemed, at first glance, to be a serious departure from their previous work. The main characters are pensioners instead of young boys. The problems portrayed are different. There is some drama in this film but humour is still present in plenty. Indian Summer has a good deal in common with the films in the Childhood series, as both examine groups of similarly aged males from the inside out. No matter if they are pensioners or young boys, these groups and their specific problems are at the center of the narrative.

On the other hand, in the 1976 film Farsighted for Two Diopters, a family comedy, the focus of the story is the clash between generations. As with Indian Summer, the tone of this film is thoughtful, but still funny. This film bears some similarity to the Soviet Union comedy Stariki-razboyniki (1971), with Yuri Nikulin and Yevgeniy Yevstigneyev as pensioners. It is known that the main character in Farsighted for Two Diopters, Dimo Manchev, was specially written and designed for Georgi Partsalev.

Their last film, The Double (1980), is part of the Bulgarian Cult Comedies Stream. The Mormarevi Brothers developed the screenplay ten years after the idea for the screenplay was given to them by a young scientist, Azarya Polikarov. The Mormarevis used him as a prototype for one of the main characters: the associate professor Denev. The choice of Todor Kolev for the two leading roles was very popular, and The Double became a hit. Quotations and dialogue from the film entered Bulgarian popular culture and daily conversation of that era.

== Credits ==
=== Television series ===
- Vasko de Gama ot selo Rupcha / Vasko de Gama from Rupcha Village (1986) - (Childhood Genre)
- Mazhe bez Mustatzi / Men Without Moustache (1989) - (Childhood Genre)

=== Films ===
- Starinnata moneta / The Ancient Coin (1965)
- Taralezhite se Razhdat bez Bodli / Porcupines Are Born Without Spines (1971) - (Childhood Genre)
- S Detsa na More / With Children at the Seaside (1972) - (Childhood Genre)
- Siromashko Lyato / Indian Summer (1973) - (Comedy, Drama)
- Izpiti po Nikoe Vreme / Exams at Any Odd Time (1974) - (Childhood Genre)
- Dva Dioptara Dalekogledstvo / Farsighted for Two Diopters (1976) - (Comedy)
- Zadacha s Mnogo Neizvestni / Problem with Many Unknown Quantities (1977) - (Childhood Genre)
- Voynata na Taralezhite / The Porcupines' War (1979) - (Childhood Genre)
- Dvoynikat / The Double (1980) - (Comedy)
- 13ta Godenitsa na Printsa / The Thirteenth Bride of the Prince (1987) - (Comedy, Fantasy)

=== Books ===
- Lily. A Novel for Children and Adults
- Problem with Many Unknown Quantities (1976)
- The Porcupines' War (1979)
- Bobby, The Head (1988)

== Awards ==
FBFF Varna (Festival for Bulgarian Featured Films)

- (1971) Special prize for Porcupines Are Born Without Spines
- (1974) Specond Award for screenplay for Exams at Any Odd Time
- (1980) Award for screenplay for The Double

Moscow International Film Festival'75

- (1971) Silver Medal for Porcupines Are Born Without Spines
- (1971) Award from special jury for funniest film for Porcupines Are Born Without Spines

Brussels International Film Festival

- (1974) FEMINA Prize for Porcupines Are Born Without Spines

Gijón International Film Festival

- (1974) Award from the Spain writers in cinema industry for Exams at Any Odd Time

Union of Bulgarian Filmmakers

- (1979) Award for child's cinema for The Porcupines' War
