= Kosta Tsonev =

Bulgarian actor (1929–2012)

Kosta Tsonev Коста Цонев
- Born: 10 June 1929; Sofia, Bulgaria
- Died: 25 January 2012 (aged 82); Sofia, Bulgaria
- Occupation: Actor

Kosta Tsonev (Bulgarian: Коста Цонев; 10 June 1929 – 25 January 2012) was a Bulgarian actor starring in theatre, TV and cinema. He was born on 10 June 1929 in the capital of Bulgaria, Sofia. He studied at the National Academy for Theatre and Film Arts. He has been married three times: twice to Anahid Tacheva and then to his present wife Elena. He has a son, famed news reader Dimitar Tsonev, and a daughter. His second oldest brother was the late Vasil Tsonev, a dry witted satirist who wrote many books which have been published in several languages. His oldest brother was the late Iwan Tsonev (Iwan Zoneff) who moved to Australia in 1950s where he became one of the biggest property developers in South Australia during the mid 60's showing the diverse talents of the 3 brothers in each of their chosen fields. The father of the three brothers was a simple house painter. In 2001 Tsonev turned to politics and was elected to the National Assembly of Bulgaria as a representative of the former National Movement Simeon II (now National Movement for Stability and Progress). He was reelected in 2005.

== Full filmography ==
- Trade Routes (2007) as Alexander Georgiev
- Shantav den (2004) as Grandfather

in Bulgarian: Шантав ден
in English: Crazy Day (Europe: English title)

- Zhrebiyat (1993) as Boris Skarlatov

in Bulgarian: Жребият
in English: The Lot

- Kragovrat (1993) as Ivan Dimovski

in Bulgarian: Кръговрат
in English: Circle

- Zweite Tod des Gregor Z., Der (1992) as Simeon Boiovic
- Nemirnata ptitza lyubov (1990) as Svidetelyat

in Bulgarian: Немирната птица любов
in English: Love Is a Willful Bird

- Bashti i sinove (1990) TV Series

in Bulgarian: Бащи и синове
in English: Fathers and Sons

- Indianski igri (1990) as Angel

in Bulgarian: Индиански игри
in English: Indian Games

- Plemennikat chuzhdenetz (1990) as Stranger

in Bulgarian: Племенникът — чужденец
in English: The Foreign Nephew

- Razvodi, razvodi... (1989) as Mariya's husband

in Bulgarian: Разводи, разводи...
in English: Divorces, Divorces...

- Neizchezvashtite (1988) TV Series

in Bulgarian: Неизчезващите
in English: People, Who Never Disappear

- Slyapa sabota (1988) as Kosta Tsonev

in Bulgarian: Сляпа събота in English: Blind Saturday

- Chicho Krastnik (1988)

in Bulgarian: Чичо Кръстник
in English: My Uncle Godfather

- Vchera (1988) as Vera's Dad

in English: Yesterday

- Dom za nashite deca (1987) TV Series as Hristo Aldanov

in Bulgarian: Дом за нашите деца
in English: Home for Our Children

- Nebe za vsichki (1987) as General director of the company

in Bulgarian: Небе за всички
in English: A Sky for All

- Vreme za pat (1987) TV Series as Hristo Aldanov

in Bulgarian: Време за път
in English: Time for Traveling (Europe: English title)

- Mechtateli (1987) as Georgi Zhivkov

in Bulgarian: Мечтатели
in English: Dreamers

- Eshelonite (1986) as Dimitar Peshev

in Bulgarian: Ешелоните на смъртта
in English: Transports of Death

- Gorski hora (1985)

in Bulgarian: Горски хора
in English: Forest People

- Porwanie (1985)

in English: Hijack

- Tazi hubava zryala vazrast (1985) as Rumen Iliev

in Bulgarian: Тази хубава зряла възраст
in English: This Fine Age of Maturity

- Boris I (1985) as Kliment Ohridski

in Bulgarian: Борис Първи
in English: The Conversion to Christianity & Discourse of Letters

- V poiskakh kapitana Granta (1985) (mini) TV Series as Hetzel

in Russian: В поисках капитана Гранта
in English: In Search for Captain Grant

- Spasenieto (1984) as Nikola Bakardzhiev

in Bulgarian: Спасението
in English: Salvation

- Falshifikatorat ot "Cherniya kos" (1983) TV Series

in Bulgarian: Фалшификаторът от `Черния кос`
in English: Faker from 'The Blackbird'

- Parizhskaya drama (1983)
- Pochti reviziya (1983) (mini) TV Series as Vakrilov

in Bulgarian: Почти ревизия
in English: Almost an Inspection

- Tzarska piesa (1982) as Alexander Tzanev, King' Adviser

in Bulgarian: Царска пиеса
in English: Royal Play

- Kristali (1982) as Akademik Abadzhiev

in Bulgarian: Кристали
in English: Crystals

- Udarat (1981) as Prince Kiril

in Bulgarian: Ударът
in English: The Thrust

- Milost za zhivite (1981) as Professor Andrey Haydutov

in Bulgarian: Милост за живите
in English: Mercy for the Living

- Sami sred valtzi (1979) TV Series as General Lukash

in Bulgarian: Сами сред вълци
in English: Alone Among Wolves

- Tayfuni s nezhni imena (1979) TV Series as Emil Boev

in Bulgarian: Тайфуни с нежни имена
in English: Typhoons with Gentle Names

- Po diryata na bezsledno izcheznalite (1979) TV Series

in Bulgarian: По дирята на безследно изчезналите
in English: On the Tracks of the Missing

- Umiray samo v kraen sluchay (1978) TV Series as Emil Boev

in Bulgarian: Умирай само в краен случай
in English: Dying in the Worst (

- Yuliya Vrevskaya (1978) as the old Rebel

in Bulgarian: Юлия Вревская

- Adios, muchachos (1978) as Vasil

in Bulgarian: Адиос, мучачос

- Baseynat (1977) as Apostol

in Bulgarian: Басейнът
in English: The Swimming Pool

- Godina ot ponedelnitzi (1977) as Anton Stamenov

in Bulgarian: Година от понеделници
in English: A Year of Mondays

- Dopalnenie kam zakona za zashtita na darzhavata (1976) as Yosif Herbst

in Bulgarian: Допълнение към закона за защита на държавата
in English: Amendment to the Defense-of-State Act

- Sinyata bezpredelnost (1976) as Emil Boev

in Bulgarian: Синята безпределност
in English: The Blue Infinity

- Rekviem za edna mrasnitza (1976) as Boev

in Bulgarian: Реквием за една мръсница
in English: Requiem for a Tramp

- Izgori, za da svetish (1976) TV Series as Pavel

in Bulgarian: Изгори, за да светиш

- Il pleut sur Santiago (1976)

in Bulgarian: Над Сантяго вали
in English: It Is Raining on Santiago

- Buna (1975)

in Bulgarian: Буна
in English: Riot

- Magistrala (1975) as Head Engineer

in Bulgarian: Магистрала
in English: A Highway

- Svatbite na Yoan Asen (1975) as Aleksander/Yoan Asen

in Bulgarian: Сватбите на Йоан Асен
in English: The Weddings of Tsar Ioan Assen

- Brazilska melodiya (1974)

in Bulgarian: Бразилска мелодия
in English: Brazilian Melody

- Bashta mi boyadzhiyata (1974) as the Father

in Bulgarian: Баща ми бояджията

- Golyamata skuka (1973) as Seymur, Uylyams

in Bulgarian: Голямата скука
in English: The Great Boredom

- Golyamata pobeda (1973) as Big Brother Bonev

in Bulgarian: Голямата победа
in English: The Great Victory

- Glutnitsata (1972) as Kalinov

in Bulgarian: Глутницата
in English: The Pack of Wolves

- Neobhodimiyat greshnik (1972) as Attorney Ivan Asenov

in Bulgarian: Необходимият грешник
in English: The Indispensable Sinner

- Na vseki kilometar — II (1971) TV Series

in Bulgarian: На всеки километър — втора част
in English: At Each Kilometer — II

- Gnevno patuvane (1971)

in Bulgarian: Гневно пътуване
in English: Wrathful Journey

- Demonat na imperiyata (1971) TV Series as Father Matey Preobrazhenski

in Bulgarian: Демонът на империята
in English: The Demon of the Empire

- Nyama nishto po-hubavo ot loshoto vreme (1971) as Evans

in Bulgarian: Няма нищо по-хубаво от лошото време
in English: There Is Nothing Finer Than Bad Weather

- Na vseki kilometar (1969) TV Series

in Bulgarian: На всеки километър
in English: At Each Kilometer

- Gospodin Nikoy (1969) as Emil Bobev

in Bulgarian: Господин Никой
in English: Mister Nobody in USA Mr. Nobody

- Svoboda ili smart (1969) as Podvoyvodata

in Bulgarian: Свобода или смърт
in English: Freedom or Death

- Chovekat ot La Mancha (1968, TV musical) as Servantes / Don Quixote

in Bulgarian: Човекът от Ла Манча
in English: Man of La Mancha

- Smart nyama (1963) as Mladenov

in English: There Is No Death

- Zlatniyat zab (1962) as Captain Lukov

in Bulgarian: Златният зъб
in English: The Golden Tooth

- Noshtta sreshtu 13-i (1961) as Major Andrey Panov

in Bulgarian: Нощта срещу тринадесети
in English: On the Eve of the 13th

- Badi shtastliva, Ani! (1961) as Boyan

in Bulgarian: Бъди щастлива, Ани!
in English: Be Happy, Ani!

- Bednata ulitza (1960) as Petar

in Bulgarian: Бедната улица
in English: Poor Man's Street

- V tiha vecher (1960) as The captain

in Bulgarian: В тиха вечер in English: On a Quiet Evening

- Komandirat na otryada (1959) as Danyo

in Bulgarian: Командирът на отряда
in English: The Commander of the Detachment

- Siromashka radost (1958) as Lazar Dabaka

in Bulgarian: Сиромашка радост
in English: Poor Man's Joy

- Dimitrovgradtsy (1956)

in Bulgarian: Димитровградци
in English: People of Dimitrovgrad
