= A Peasant on a Bicycle =

Селянинът с Колелото (A Peasant on a Bicycle)
- Georgi Georgiev - Gets as the Peasant on a Bicycle
- Directed by: Lyudmil Kirkov
- Written by: Georgi Mishev
- Starring: Georgi Georgiev - Gets; Georgi Rusev; Diana Chelebieva; Svetoslav Peev; Evstati Stratev
- Music by: Boris Karadimchev
- Production company: SFF / a Film Unite Hemus
- Release date: 22 November 1974
- Running time: 102 minutes
- Country: Bulgaria
- Language: Bulgarian

A Peasant on a Bicycle (Bulgarian: Селянинът с Колелото, romanized: Selyaninat s Koleloto) is a Bulgarian drama film released in 1974, directed by Lyudmil Kirkov, starring Georgi Georgiev-Getz, Diana Chelebieva, Georgi Rusev and Evstati Stratev.

== Plot ==
Born in the small village of Yugla, Yordan (Gets) lives with his family in the nearby town. Filled with homesickness he takes every opportunity, traveling usually by his bicycle, to visit the more and more depopulated village. And that's how, mounted on the bike his life passes between the town and Yugla. During one of the visits to his old home he meets the newly appointed young pharmacist Maglena (Chelebieva). She is accommodated in his country house. Little by little Yordan falls in love with her.

Burning with love for both Maglena and the country life he starts persuading managers and colleagues, in the factory where he works, to move one of the workshops to the village of Yugla. He dreams that the far-off days of rural vitality can be born anew. He believes that in this way the young people will come back. But his nostalgia is not understood by the people. No one follows him. Moreover, he becomes gradually aware that Maglena, his new love, is from the different world of the new generation. He finally understands that those times are long gone and the only things remaining are the bicycle and loneliness.

== Production ==
Production company:

- Studio of Featured Films (SFF) - a Film Unit HEMUS

The film is also translated as The Peasant with the Bike

- Director:Lyudmil Kirkov
- Writer: Georgi Mishev
- Director of Photography: Georgi Rusinov
- Music: Boris Karadimchev

Filmed: 1974; Premiered: 22 November 1974

== Cast ==
- Georgi Georgiev - Gets as Yordan
- Georgi Rusev as Docho Bulgurov
- Diana Chelebieva as Maglena
- Evstati Stratev as the fellow-countryman
- Svetoslav Peev as Angel
- Lili Eneva as Yordan's wife
- Zlatina Doncheva as Docho Bulgurov's wife
- Georgi Kishkilov as Kaytashev
- Mariana Alamancheva as Tancheto
- Yuri Yakovlev as Maglena's father

== Response ==
A reported 1,009,283 admissions were recorded for the film in cinemas throughout Bulgaria.

The film was subsumed among the 50 golden Bulgarian films in the book by the journalist Pencho Kovachev. The book was published in 2008 by "Zahariy Stoyanov" publishing house.

There were the following publications:

- Film News Magazine, vol. 12-1974, p. 7 - by I. Bozhinova
- Otechestven Front news paper, vol.9321-21.11.1974 - by E. Vasileva
- FILM ART magazine, vol. 10,1973, p. 89 - published the screenplay
- Bulgarian Film Magazine, vol.5, 1975, p. 14 - by G. Mishev
- National Culture news paper, vol. 49-30.11.1974 - by V. Naydenova
- New Films Magazine, vol. 12-1974
- Film News Magazine, vol. 5-1974, p. 2 - by M.Racheva

== Awards ==
FBFF Varna'74 (Festival for Bulgarian Featured Films)

- Second Award for director Lyudmil Kirkov, screenwriter Georgi Mishev and the cameraman Georgi Rusinov
- The Critics Award
- Award for best actor in a leading role for Georgi Georgiev - Gets

9th Moscow International Film Festival

- Award for best actor in a leading role for Georgi Georgiev - Gets
- Award from Soviet Screen Magazine
