= Georgi Georgiev-Getz =

Bulgarian actor (1926–1996)

- Born: October 4, 1926 village of Razpopovtsi, Bulgaria
- Died: September 2, 1996 (aged 69); Sofia, Bulgaria
- Occupations: Film and Theater Actor
- Years active: 1953–1996
- Spouse: Tsena Georgieva

Georgi Georgiev-Getz (Bulgarian: Георги Георгиев-Гец; October 4, 1926 – September 2, 1996) was a Bulgarian film and stage actor.

Best known for portraying valiant and honest conservative men, Getz was among the prominent names in the Bulgarian cinematography and theatre during the second half of the 20th century. He appeared in many of the Bulgarian film classics such as We Were Young (1961), The Tied Up Balloon (1967), The Eighth (1969), Thorn Apple (1972), Matriarchy (1977) and probably his most notable role as Yordan in A Peasant on a Bicycle (1974) for which he received an award for Best Actor at the 9th Moscow International Film Festival in 1975.

== Biography and career ==
He was born as Georgi Ivanov Georgiev on October 4, 1926, in the village of Razpopovtsi, today neighborhood of the town of Elena, Bulgaria. In 1947, after finishing the secondary school, he went to Sofia where he enrolled in acting at The National Academy for Theatre and Film Arts graduating in 1953. After the graduation, Getz joined the troupe of the Ivan Vazov National Theatre where he remained for almost his whole career until 1990.

Georgi Georgiev-Getz died as a result of a stroke on September 2, 1996, in Sofia, Bulgaria.

== Full filmography ==
- Utro nad Rodinata (1951) as the Locksmith

in Bulgarian: Утро над Родината
in English: Dawn Over the Homeland

- Nasha zemya (1952) as Dimo

in Bulgarian: Наша земя
in English: Our Land

- Nespokoen pat (1955) as the Khazak

in Bulgarian: Неспокоен път
in English: Troubled Road, a Man Decides

- Tochka parva (1956)

in Bulgarian: Точка първа
in English:Item One

- Zakonat na moreto (1958) as Petar

in Bulgarian: Законът на морето
in English: The Law of the Sea

- Parvi urok (1960) as Pesho's Brother

in Bulgarian: Първи урок
in English: First Lesson The Old Lady in the UK

- A byahme mladi (1961) as Mladen

in Bulgarian: А бяхме млади
in English: We Were Young

- Noshtta sreshtu trinadeseti (1961) as General

in Bulgarian: Нощта срещу тринадесети
in English: On the Eve of the 13th

- Stramnata pateka (1961) as Ivan Diviya

in Bulgarian: Стръмната пътека
in English: The Steep Path

- Zlatniyat zab (1962) as Captain Prodan Lipovski, The Golden Tooth

in Bulgarian: Златният зъб
in English: The Golden Tooth

- Hypnosis (1962)

in German: Nur tote Zeugen schweigen
in French: Le Tueur à la rose rouge

- Chernata reka (1964) as Dobri

in Bulgarian: Черната река
in English: The Black River

- Neprimirimite (1964) as Atanas

in Bulgarian: Непримиримите
in English: The Intransigents

- Mazhe (1966)

in Bulgarian: Мъже
in English: Men

- Mezhdu dvamata (1966) as Halata, Plamen's father

in Bulgarian: Между двамата
in English: Between Parents

- Nay-dalgata nosht (1967) as Stranger

in Bulgarian: Най-дългата нощ
in English: The Longest Night

- S dah na bademi (1967) as Mihail Nikodimov

in Bulgarian: С дъх на бадеми
in English: Taste of Almonds

- The Tied Up Balloon / Privarzaniyat balon (1967) as Peasant

in Bulgarian: Привързаният балон
in English: The Tied Up Balloon

- Nebeto na Veleka (1968) as Martin

in Bulgarian: Небето на Велека
in English: The Sky Over the Veleka

- Osmiyat (1969) as Osmiyat

in Bulgarian: Осмият
in English: The Eighth

- Trugni na put (1969) as Predsedatelyat Radi Radulov

in Bulgarian: Тръгни на път
in English: Set Out Again

- Na vseki kilometar (1969, TV Series) as the Voivode (unknown episodes)

in Bulgarian: На всеки километър
in English: At Each Kilometer

- Chetirimata ot vagona (1970) as Kapitan Draganov

in Bulgarian: Четиримата от вагона
in English: Four Men in a Boxcar

- Tzitadelata otgovori (1970) as Major Petar Hariev

in Bulgarian: Цитаделата отговори
in English: The Citadel Replied

- Nyama nishto po-hubavo ot loshoto vreme (1971) as Emil Boev

in Bulgarian: Няма нищо по-хубаво от лошото време
in English: There Is Nothing Finer Than Bad Weather

- Tatul (1972) as Ganchovski

in Bulgarian: Татул
in English: Thorn Apple

- Igrek 17 (1973) as Kapitan Rudev

in Bulgarian: Игрек 17
in English: Y-17

- Zarevo nad Drava (1974) as Major Boyan Vasilev

in Bulgarian: Зарево над Драва
in English: Dawn Over the Drava

- Posledniyat ergen (1974) as the Colonel

in Bulgarian: Последният ерген
in English: The Last Bachelor

- Selyaninat s Koleloto (1974) as Yordan

in Bulgarian: Селянинът с колелото
in English: A Peasant on a Bicycle

- Dopalnenie kam zakona za zashtita na darzhavata (1976) as the Man with the cigarette

in Bulgarian: Допълнение към закона за защита на държавата
in English: Amendment to the Law for the Defense of the State

- Matriarhat' (1977) as Milor

in Bulgarian: Матриархат
in English: Matriarchy

- Sami sred valtzi (1979, TV Series) as Geshev

in Bulgarian: Сами сред вълци
in English: Alone Among Wolves

- Patyat kam Sofia (1979, TV Mini-Series) as Kliment Budinov

in Bulgarian: Пътят към София
in English: The Way to Sofia

- Trite smurtni gryaha (1980) as Kuzdo Karakozov

in Bulgarian: Трите смъртни гряха
in English: Three Deadly Sins

- Uoni (1980) as Ivan Gyaurov - Uoni

in Bulgarian: Уони
in English: Wonny (Europe)

- Milost za zhivite (1981) as Bay Stefan

in Bulgarian: Милост за живите
in English: Mercy for the Living

- Prishestvie (1981)

in Bulgarian: Пришествие
in English: Advent

- Udarat (1981)

in Bulgarian: Ударът
in English: The Thrust

- Spirka "Berlin" (1982)

in Bulgarian: Спирка `Берлин`
in English: 'Berlin' Station

- Nay-tezhkiyat gryah (1982) as Simeonov-Vedrin

in Bulgarian: Най-тежкият грях
in English: The Worst Sin

- Niccolo Paganini (1982, TV Mini-Series)
- Ravnovesie (1983) as the Script-writer

in Bulgarian: Равновесие
in English: Balance

- Otkoga te chakam (1984) as Former director

in Bulgarian: Откога те чакам
in English: It's Nice to See You

- Stenata (1984) as Chichov

in Bulgarian: Стената
in English: The Dam

- Mechtanie sam az (1985)

in Bulgarian: Мечтание съм аз
in English: I Am a Dream

- Denyat na vladetelite (1986) as Dilon

in Bulgarian: Денят на владетелите
in English: The Day of the Rulers

- Te naddelyaha (1986) as Bay Dragan

in Bulgarian: Те надделяха
in English: They Prevailed

- Vasko de Gama ot selo Rupcha (1986, TV Series) as Captain of the Ship

in Bulgarian: Васко де Гама от село Рупча
in English: Vasko de Gama from Rupcha Village

- Vecheri v Antimovskiya han (1988, TV Series) as Kalmuka

in Bulgarian: Вечери в Антимовския хан
in English: Evenings in the Antim's Inn

- Prokurorat (1988) as the prosecutor Miladin Voynov

in Bulgarian: Прокурорът
in English: The Prosecutor

- Zhivotut si teche tiho... (1988) as Petko

in Bulgarian: Животът си тече тихо...
in English: Life Flows Slowly by...

- Bashta (1989) as the Father

in Bulgarian: Баща
in English: Father

- Pravo na izbor (1989)

in Bulgarian: Право на избор
in English: Right to Choose

- Pod igoto (1990, TV Series) as Chorbadzhi Marko

in Bulgarian: Под игото
in English: Under the Yoke

- Kragovrat (1993) as Shanov (final film role)

in Bulgarian: Кръговрат
in English: Circle
