= Indian Summer (1973 film) =

Сиромашко Лято (Indian Summer)
- Directed by: Milen Nikolov
- Written by: Mormarevi Brothers
- Starring: Georgi Partsalev; Tatyana Lolova; Ivan Kondov; Itzhak Fintzi; Leda Taseva
- Cinematography: Rumen Georgiev
- Music by: Boris Karadimchev
- Production companies: SFF, a Film Unite Mladost
- Distributed by: Analysis Film Releasing Corporation (U.S.)
- Release date: 1973
- Running time: 79 minutes
- Country: Bulgaria
- Language: Bulgarian

Indian Summer (Bulgarian: Сиромашко Лято / Siromashko Lyato) is a 1973 Bulgarian comedy-drama film directed by Milen Nikolov and written by Mormarevi Brothers. The film stars Georgi Partsalev, Tatyana Lolova, Ivan Kondov, Itzhak Fintzi and Leda Taseva. The movie was distributed in the U.S. by Analysis Film Releasing Corp.

== Plot ==
The day that the financial clerk Metodi Rashkov retires finally arrives. He is a shy and quiet man and he accepts all tasks given to him by his son and daughter-in-law without argument. With time, he becomes a housekeeper; he shops, cooks and looks after his grandson. In order to save face in front of his friends he lies to them and becomes embroiled in a variety of uncomfortable situations. The "explosion" is imminent. Rashkov leaves his home. Soon the freedom which he wanted becomes boring for him. The abandoned family begins to miss the grandfather. Eventually everyone acknowledges their mistakes and make amends. The birth of a second grandson is the event which brings everyone under the same roof again.

== Cast ==
| Character | Actor | Role |
|---|---|---|
| Metodi Rashkov | Georgi Partsalev | the grandfather just retired on a pension |
| Neychev | Ivan Kondov | Rashkov's friend, retired too |
| Toteva | Tatyana Lolova | a social figure |
| Tsvetarski | Itzhak Fintzi | Toteva's suitor |
| Radka | Leda Taseva | Rashkov's neighbour, retired too |
| | Milen Penev | Rashkov's son |
| | Emilia Dragostinova | Rashkov's daughter-in-law |
| Tedi | Kircho Petrov | Rashkov's grandson |
| Dobrev | Evstati Stratev | police inspector |

== Response ==
A reported 947,814 admissions were recorded for the film in cinemas throughout Bulgaria.

The film was subsumed among the 50 golden Bulgarian films in the book by the journalist Pencho Kovachev. The book was published in 2008 by "Zahariy Stoyanov" publishing house.
