= Todor Dinov =

Film director (1919–2004)

- Born: 24 July 1919; Western Thrace (today Alexandroupoli, Greece)
- Died: 17 June 2004 (aged 84); Sofia, Bulgaria
- Occupations: Film director, animator, comics artist, caricaturist
- Years active: 1955–2000

Todor Dinov (Bulgarian: Тодор Динов) (24 July 1919 – 17 June 2004) was a Bulgarian animator informally known as the Father of Bulgarian animation. During his lifetime, he wrote and directed more than 40 short animated films and several live-action feature films, and was also a popular illustrator, children's book illustrator, painter, graphic artist, comics artist and caricaturist.

== Biography ==
Dinov was born to a Bulgarian family in Dedeagach in Western Thrace (today Alexandroupoli, Greece) and finished school in Plovdiv, Bulgaria. He studied at the Gerasimov Institute of Cinematography in Moscow under the tutelage of distinguished Soviet animators such as Ivan Ivanov-Vano. Dinov created his own first animated film, Yunak Marko (English: Marko the Hero), in 1955. Perhaps his best-known animated film in the West is the five-minute short Margaritka (English: The Daisy), produced in 1965. The film features a square-shaped little man trying to cut down a daisy and failing, then becoming more and more enraged as he tries increasingly brutal methods against the flower; in the end, the daisy only responds to the love of a child. Oddly, Margaritka won a prize for best children's film even though it was meant for adults.

In 1967 he was a member of the jury of the 5th Moscow International Film Festival.

He founded the first animation studio in Bulgaria, setting the highest quality professional standards for producing animation in his country. Later, he created the Animation Department (now a separate major) and taught animation classes at the Theatre and Film Arts Institute. Dinov was also a member of the Bulgarian Academy of Sciences.

In 1999, Dinov was awarded the highest-rank Bulgarian medal — the Stara Planina order (First Degree). In 2003 he received the Crystal Pyramide Award of the Bulgarian Filmmaker Union for lifetime achievement to the art of Bulgarian animation.

He died in Sofia at the age of 84.

== Filmography ==
The following are some of the animated films directed by Dinov. Titles have been transliteratred from Cyrillic to Latin, and are followed by their names in English where available:

- Yunak Marko ("Marko the Hero") (November 16, 1955)
- Prikazka za borovoto klonche ("Tale of the Pine Twig") (April 22, 1960)
- Gramootvodat ("Lightning Rod") (February 1, 1962)
- Yabalkata ("The Apple") (April 1, 1963)
- Revnost ("Jealousy") (September 25, 1963)
- Margaritka ("The Daisy") (July 24, 1965)
- Izgonen ot raya ("Banished from Eden") (March 27, 1967)
- Prometey ("Prometheus XX") (August 4, 1970)
- Tapanat ("The Kettle-Drum") (July 24, 1973)
- Malkoto Anche (July 24, 2000)
