= Nikolay Binev =

Bulgarian actor (1934–2003)

Николай Бинев Nikolay Binev
- Born: 5 July 1934; Sliven, Bulgaria
- Died: 8 December 2003 (aged 69); Sofia, Bulgaria
- Occupations: Film and Theater Actor
- Years active: 1959–2003
- Spouse: Domna Ganeva

Nikolay Binev (Bulgarian: Николай Бинев; 5 July 1934 - 8 December 2003) was a Bulgarian theater and film actor. During most of his career he was the soul and history of the Mladezhki Theater, Sofia and remained devoted to it until the end of his life. In 2006, in his honor, the theater was named after him.

== Biography and career ==
Binev was born on 5 July 1934 in the town of Sliven, Bulgaria. In 1958 he graduated as an actor in Krastyo Sarafov National Academy for Theatre and Film Arts.

In 1959, after several months on the stage with the Ruse Theater, Binev entered the Mladezhki Theater, Sofia where he stayed until the end of his life. "...Binev was an encyclopedist and a man with a unique sense of humor..." said the director Andrey Avramov. He was also known for his delicate and remarkable way of dealing with people. At the stage of the theater Binev created eminent performances in plays as: Socrates by Guilherme Figueiredo, Amadeus by Peter Shaffer, The Dresser by Ronald Harwood, King John by Friedrich Dürrenmatt, When the Roses Dance by Valery Petrov and so on. He was honored twice with ASKEER, Bulgarian award of theater art.

Binev started his film career in the beginning of the 1960s. Most notable are his performances in Amendment to the Defense-of-State Act awarded with Golden Rose at FBFF Varna'76 (Festival for Bulgarian Featured Films) and the TV series Nights with the White Horses with the memorable role as Academician Urumov for which he was awarded from the Union of Bulgarian Filmmakers and the city of Sofia. During the last years of his career Binev participated in some foreign productions as East/West (1999) with Catherine Deneuve.

He was decorated with the high government prize the Order of Saint Cyril and Saint Methodius.

In 2004 the Mladezhki Theater, together with Binev's wife Domna Ganeva, released a CD named Nikolay Binev singing. The edition includes some of his musical performances among which are arias from Verdi's operas and songs from the musical Yesterday by Lyubomir Denev.

Binev died in 2003 at the age of 69.

== Filmography ==
Year	Film	Role	Notes
1961	Stramnata pateka / The Steep Path	Tihiya	Bulgarian: Стръмната пътека
1966	Mazhe / Men		Bulgarian: Мъже
1970	Sbogom, priyateli! / Farewell, Friends!	the head of the school	Bulgarian: Сбогом, приятели!
1971	Ne se obrashtay nazad / Don't Turn Back	the medical auxiliary	Bulgarian: Не се обръщай назад
1971	Nyama nishto po-hubavo ot loshoto vreme / There Is Nothing Better Than Bad Weather	Bauer	Bulgarian: Няма нищо по-хубаво от лошото време
1972	Avtostop/ Hitchhiking	the writer	Bulgarian: Автостоп
1972	Sartse choveshko / A Human Heart	the minister	Bulgarian: Сърце човешко
1972	Obich / Affection	the manager	Bulgarian: Обич
1973	Kato Pesen / Like a Song	Margarita's father	Bulgarian: Като песен
1973	Poslednata duma / The Last Word	the investigator	Bulgarian: Последната дума
1973	Golyamata skuka / The Great Boredom	Todorovr	Bulgarian: Голямата скука
1975	Otkade se znaem? / Where Have We Met?		Bulgarian: Откъде се знаем?
1975	Nezabravimijat den / The Memorable Day		Bulgarian: Незабравимият ден
1976	Spomen za Bliznachkata / Memory of the Twin Sister	narrator	Bulgarian: Спомен за близначката
1976	Dopalnenie kam zakona za zashtita na darzhavata / Amendment to the Defense-of-State Act	the delicate	Bulgarian: Допълнение към закона за защита на държавата
1977	Zvezdi v Kosite, Salzi v Ochite / Stars in Her Hair, Tears in Her Eyes	Dinko Syarov	Bulgarian: Звезди в косите, сълзи в очите
1977	Slanchev udar / Sunstroke	Lazarov	Bulgarian: Слънчев удар
1978	Chuy petela / Hark to the Cock	Old Toshe	Bulgarian: Чуй петела
1978	Umiray samo v kraen sluchay / Dying in the Worst	Dreyk	TV series Bulgarian: Умирай само в краен случай
1979	Bumerang / Boomerang	the writer Boris Krastev	Bulgarian: Бумеранг
1979	Kashtata / The House	Kupenkov	Bulgarian: Къщата
1979	Sami sred valtzi / Alone Among Wolves	doctor Delius	TV series Bulgarian: Сами сред вълци
1980	Yumrutsi v Prastta / Fists in the Soil	Kamenov	Bulgarian: Юмруци в пръстта
1982	Esenno slantse / Autumn Sun	Mr. Teodosiy	Bulgarian: Есенно слънце
1982	Nay-tezhkiyat gryah / The Worst Sin	the meek	Bulgarian: Най-тежкият грях
1983	Konstantin filosof / Constantine the Philosopher		Bulgarian: Константин философ
1983	Tretoto litze / Third Side of the Coin	Professor Pangarov	Bulgarian: Третото лице
1983	Meko kazano / Speaking Mildly		Bulgarian: Меко казано
1984	Poetat i dyavolat / The Poet and the Devil	the professor	Bulgarian: Поетът и дяволът
1985	Denyat ne si lichi po zaranta / Day Is Not Obvious from the Morning	Tomas	TV series Bulgarian: Денят не си личи по заранта
1985	Noshtem s belite kone / Nights with the White Horses	Academician Urumov	TV series Bulgarian: Нощем с белите коне
1987	Dvoyna primka / Double Noose		TV mini-series Bulgarian: Двойна примка
1990	Nemirnata ptitza lyubov / Love Is a Willful Bird	the actor	Bulgarian: Немирната птица любов
1992	Vampiri, talasami / Vampires, Spooks	Shani	Bulgarian: Вампири, таласъми
1993	Fatalna nezhnost / Fatal Tenderness	Boris Liteyski	Bulgarian: Фатална нежност
1993	Zhrebiyat / The Lot	Farhi	Bulgarian: Жребият
1994	Lyubovni sanishta / Love Dreams		Bulgarian: Любовни сънища
1997	Sulamit		Bulgarian: Суламит
1998	Sinbad: The Battle of the Dark Knights	Pop-Pop	
1999	Bridge of Dragons	The Doctor	USA production
1999	Bloodsport 4: The Dark Kumite	Judge (as Nikolay Binev)	
1999	East/West	Sergei Kozlov	Bulgarian: Изток - Запад; Russian: Восток-Запад; French: Est-Ouest
2002	Derailed (2002 film)	Vincent Gruber	
2002	Pansion za kucheta / Dogs' Home	Filip	Bulgarian: Пансион за кучета
2003	Alien Hunter	Dr. Alexi Gierach	
