= Dimitar Petrov =

Bulgarian film director

- Born: 22 October 1924; Rila, Bulgaria
- Died: 16 October 2018 (aged 93)
- Occupation: Film director
- Years active: 1955 – 1991

Dimitar Petrov (Bulgarian: Димитър Петров, 22 October 1924 – 16 October 2018) was a Bulgarian film director. He directed 12 films between 1955 and 1991.

== Selected filmography ==
- Porcupines Are Born Without Bristles (1971)
- With Children at the Seaside (1972)
- A Dog in a Drawer (1982)
