= Whale (film) =

Кит (English: Whale)
- the new DVD cover
- Directed by: Petar B. Vasilev
- Written by: Hristo Mihov - Cheremuhin
- Starring: Georgi Kaloyanchev; Dimitar Panov; Georgi Partsalev; Grigor Vachkov; Tsvyatko Nikolov
- Cinematography: Emil Vagenshtain
- Music by: Atanas Boyadzhiev
- Release date: 1970
- Running time: 76 minutes
- Country: Bulgaria
- Language: Bulgarian

Whale (Bulgarian: Кит / Kit) is a 1970 Bulgarian satirical comedy film directed by Petar B. Vasilev and written by Cheremuhin. The film stars Georgi Kaloyanchev, Dimitar Panov, Georgi Partsalev, Grigor Vachkov and Tsvyatko Nikolov.

This film had one of the most scandalous and at the same time mythological destinies in the history of Bulgarian cinema. It was filmed in 1967 but not released until 1970 when it was shown at a few small cinema halls in an edition that had been expurgated by the communist authorities. Whale satirizes the extant defects in the economic and social structure of the state in those years. Moreover, the film unambiguously specifies the exact carriers of the negative effects. The target is the bureaucratic pathos at the different ruling levels. The pathos by means of which various data and information are manipulated in the name of non-existing achievements.

In the film was born one of the most popular quotes in the Bulgarian cinema:

Fishing boat captain:
"It's a sprat, but it's still a fish."
Fisherman:
"It's a fish, but it's still a sprat!"

== Plot ==
A small fishing ship after an unsuccessful quest for some draught got not more than a single fish on top of everything the smallest one - a sprat. Despite the miserable catch the captain (Vachkov) reports through the transmitter to the superior of the fishing base Petrov (Nikolov). Of course he mentions a bigger species of fish and doesn't particularize the quantity. After months without any production from the enterprise, the superior of the base in his turn reports personally to the big local boss Kalcho Kalchev (Panov). One more time the species are enlarged and even the presence of a considerable shoal is entangled. Sitting to the table the two men have a drink or two of some cognac to celebrate the occasion. They don't stop and decide to specify the catch as a draught of dolphins as more massy kind of sea creature. Being in private later the local boss has a colourful monologue with the portrait on the wall portraying the minister Parushev (Kaloyanchev) of the field they work in. Finally the Kalchev's right hand - the lead engineer (Partsalev) insinuate that the dolphin, as a matter of fact, is actually a kind of an whale.

" ... He is going to tell me to take my hat and go back to the hatter's where I came from ..."

— Kalcho Kalchev imagine how he will be dismissed by Parushev if they don't make some production.

One day at the head department in the capital the message is received - "... We got an whale ...". The state employees informs the minister, who spends his days in the villa around the city. Excitement spreads. In a fit of euphoria, Parushev proposes a new name for their state department: 'The Ministry of Whales'. The ideas of a whales festival is born; Even a whaling flotilla is mentioned. Leading the procession, Parushev, Kalchev and all of the involved gather at the pier to welcome the inbound ship. The meeting of the fishermen is the culmination of the bureaucratic farce.

== Production ==
=== The Idea ===
It is all began with the jovial captain (Vachkov) and "... sprat but fish ... fish but sprat ..."

In the beginning of the 1950s the screenwriter Hristo Mihov, nicknamed Cheremuhin, followed his wife in the town of Aitos where she was allocated as a doctor. The town is not far from the seaside so Cheremuhin heard many maritime stories. Once, one of the locals told him a story about a fisherman who caught some sprats but boasted that he had caught mackerels. Each time the story was told the fish became bigger and bigger until it turned into a story about the fisherman catching a shark. The people then pointed out the fact that there are no sharks in that sea, to which the fisherman replied: "... How do you know?! I have even seen a whale out there ...". Mihov undertook a ten-day sailing trip amongst the fishermen so that he could learn their terminology and knowledge. Later he sat behind the typewriter and by 1955 the short novel was complete.

=== Screenplay and filming ===
When Cheremuhin and his wife returned to Sofia he got together with his acquaintance Anzhel Vagenshtain. Being a manager of the screenwriters committee Vagenshtain immediately realized the potentiality of the novel. In his turn he introduced Mihov to the director Petar B. Vasilev. Vasilev, with the forthcoming fame as a director of The Past-Master, and Cheremuhin retired in the ex-royal residence Sitnyakovo which was turned into the Writer's Union base. In two months the screenplay was completed.

The maritime scenes were filmed in Sozopol. The work progressed in a friendly and cheerful atmosphere. There was some talk that Grigor Vachkov gave many ideas about the funny cues in some episodes. Other parts were filmed in the Cinema Center near the Sofia suburb Boyana. There was situated the villa of the minister Parushev.

The song that was sung by the state employees while going to the Parushev's villa was composed by Atanas Boyadzhiev. The lyric was by the poet Plamen Tsonev:

" How cheerfully and skilfully
we make something out of nothing,
and we make nothing out of something
but flags we wave "

— the song in the bus

This song became a hit but the censorship came after instead of some gala premiere.

=== Censorship ===
" 1. The scene with the captain's mother must be shortened
2. All the bleating must be removed
3. The reference to Khan Asparuh must be removed
4. The scene in Kalchev's office must be shortened
5. The scene showing naked bodies must be shortened
6. The mentioning of Elisaveta, Gagarin and all the lines about the juxtaposition between socialism and capitalism must be removed
7. The line by Kalchev: "...I overthrow imperialism..." must be dropped
8. The scenes with the young Komsomol secretary character must be shortened
9. The final speech by Parushev must be totally revised

The film's direction should immediately start working on these corrections. "

— the first instructions from the director general of cinematography sent to the authors.

Shortly after Whale was filmed in 1967, Eastern Europe was shaken by the doings around the Prague Spring. So it was a very delicate moment. Of course in the direction of the Bulgarian Communist Party, which forcibly took the monocracy in the country, were aware of the biting satire of the communist economic model represented in the film. Moreover, the authorities noticed even an allusion between the character of Parushev (Kaloyanchev) and the leader of the Bulgarian communists and President of the Republic of that time Todor Zhivkov. There was also perceived to be some relation between the character of Kalcho Kalchev (Panov) and Stanko Todorov, another communist leader. In the film Kalchev is the general executive of the local enterprise. But before that it became clear that he was simply a hatter. As a matter of fact Stanko Todorov was a tailor in his youth.

The director Vasilev and the cinematographer Emil Vagenshtain bravely struggled with the censoring. The reel stayed more than a two years in the basement stores. At that time the big scandal with some local communist leader burst out in the country. He reported a great crop of wheat for what he was awarded. Subsequently, it turned out that the crop was below the average.

Radoy Ralin as the ichthyologist

On top of everything the screenwriter's brother emigrated to USA. He was a nuclear physicist and after a specialization in France he left for North America instead of returning to Bulgaria. The appearance of Radoy Ralin in an episode as an ichthyologist also added oil to the flames. Being famous writer satirist and a poet he was also a well known dissident during the communist regime.

" 1. The speech by Parushev on the TV to be shortened.
2. The whole speech by Kalcho Kalchev in front of the Parushev portrait to be dropped out."

— the second letter sent to the authors from an assistant director general of the cinematography.

Finally the film was released but at first in only two cinema halls in the city of Plovdiv. Even without any advertisement the tickets are sold out. Afterwards Whale was shown in the small Levski cinema in the capital of Sofia again with no preliminary announcement. There were cues and frames missing even the whole episodes were cut off.

The non censored edition was released on DVD in 2000s.

== Cast ==
The film features Bulgarian comic actors. Kaloyanchev, Panov and Partsalev are in theirs best. Unfortunately Whale is the last film for the Tsvyatko Nikolov. He died shortly when the film was released in 1970. In some episodes we can see the director Vasilev's wife the actress Valentina Borisova. The acting of the memorable Grigor Vachkov should be also pointed out. It is known that one of the fishermen in the ship around Vachkov was his wife's brother in the real life.

Character	Actor	Role
Parushev	Georgi Kaloyanchev	the minister
Kalcho Kalchev	Dimitar Panov	the general executive
	Georgi Partsalev	the lead engineer
Gerdzhikliyski	Grigor Vachkov	the captain of the boat
Petrov	Tsvyatko Nikolov	the superior of the fishing base
	Evstati Stratev	the boat sailing superior
Baba Stoyna	Stoyanka Mutafova	the captain's mother
	Nikola Dinev	the editor
	Georgi Naumov	the telegraph operator
	Naicho Petrov	first assistant director general
	Georgi Popov	second assistant director general
	Radoy Ralin	Bostandzhiev, the ichthyologis
	Renata Kiselichka	the Komsomol leader
	Nadya Topalova	driver
	Lyubomir Kiselichki	the young research worker
	Kremena Trendafilova	
	Katya Chukova	
	Valentina Borisova	
	Bogdana Vulpe	
	Valentin Rusetzki	
	Gerasim Mladenov	
	Borislav Ivanov	
	Lambi Poryazov	

== Response ==
A reported 599,350 admissions were recorded for the film in cinemas throughout Bulgaria. Taking into consideration that, because of the censorship, it was released in small cinema halls with no advertisement the film Whale attracted considerable audience.

After the liberation in 1989/90 the film was at first broadcast on the Bulgarian National Television. Naturally, it gave rise to a broad interest and took his due place among the notable Bulgarian films of those years. Subsequently, during the 2000s, it was released on DVD.

The film was subsumed among the 50 golden Bulgarian films in the book by the journalist Pencho Kovachev. The book was published in 2008 by "Zahariy Stoyanov" publishing house.
