= Plamen Maslarov =

Bulgarian film director and theater director

Plamen Maslarov (Bulgarian: Пламен Масларов) (1 January 1950 – 8 June 2010) was a Bulgarian film and theater director, who served as the head of the Bulgarian National Film Archive from 2004 until 2010.

== Biography ==
Maslarov was born in 1950. He graduated from National Academy of Theater and Film Arts in Sofia in 1974 with a degree in drama theater directing.
