= Peter Slabakov =

Bulgarian actor (1923–2009)

- Born: 24 April 1923; Lyaskovetz, Bulgaria
- Died: 17 May 2009 (aged 86); Berievo, Bulgaria
- Occupation: Actor
- Years active: 1960–2006
- Relatives: Andrei Slabakov (son)

Peter Slabakov (24 April 1923 – 17 May 2009) was a Bulgarian actor. He had appeared in 85 films since 1960. His last film was Investigation (2006). His son Andrei Slabakov is an actor, film director, and Member of the European Parliament.

Right after the fall of the communist regime in Bulgaria in 1989, he was elected member of the 7th Grand National Assembly of Bulgaria on the ballot of the right-wing Union of Democratic Forces. Slabakov served as MP again from 1995 to 1997 as part of the parliamentary group of the green and emblematic for the democratic changes in Bulgaria Ekoglasnost party.

He died on 17 May 2009 at the age of 86.

== Selected filmography ==
- Tobacco (1962)
- Captive Flock (1962)
- Torrid Noon (1966)
- The Tied Up Balloon (1967)
- Tango (1969)
- Dawn Over the Drava (1971)
- A Cricket in the Ear (1976)
- The Swimming Pool (1977)
- Investigation (2006)
