= Andrei Slabakov =

Bulgarian actor

- Андрей Слабаков
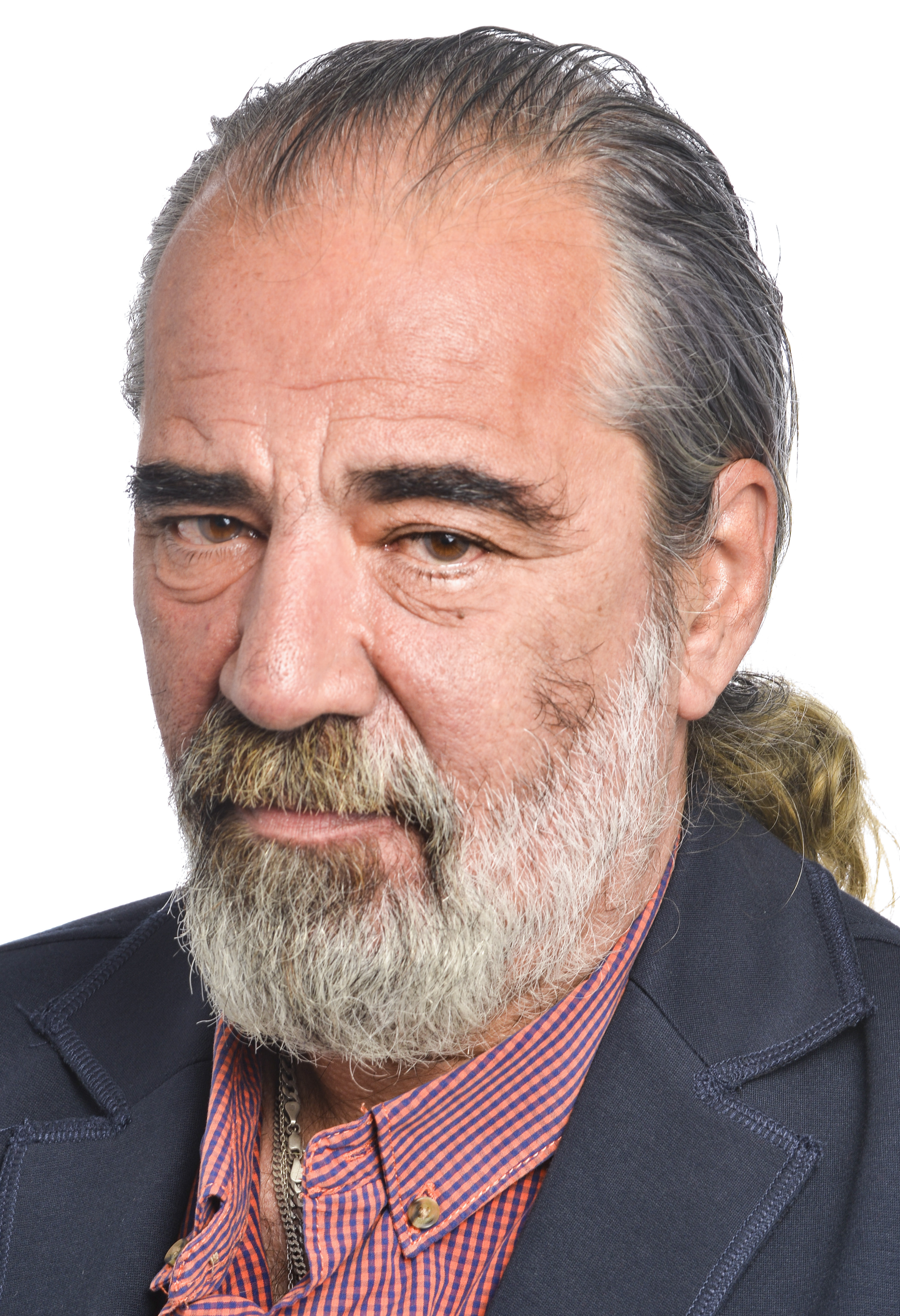

Member of the European Parliament for Bulgaria
- In office 2 July 2019 – 15 July 2024

Personal details
- Born: 13 August 1960 (age 65) Sofia, Bulgaria
- Party: VMRO – Bulgarian National Movement

Andrei Petrov Slabakov (Bulgarian: Андрей Петров Слабаков; born 13 August 1960) is a Bulgarian actor, film director, and screenwriter who was elected as a Member of the European Parliament in 2019.
