= Georgi Djulgerov =

Bulgarian film director, screenwriter, producer and professor

- Born: 30 September 1943 (age 82); Burgas, Bulgaria
- Occupations: Film director; screenwriter; producer
- Years active: 1970–present

Georgi Djulgerov (Bulgarian: Георги Дюлгеров) is a Bulgarian film director, screenwriter, producer and professor at the National Academy for Theatre and Film Arts.

== Career ==
Djulgerov was born in Burgas, Bulgaria, on 30 September 1943. After graduating from the Gerasimov Institute of Cinematography in Moscow in 1970, he directed numerous feature films and several documentaries, many of which were shown in the competition or parallel programs of the international film festivals in Berlin, Locarno, Oberhausen, Avellino, Palermo, Rotterdam, Montreal, San Francisco, Batumi, Mons, Mannheim-Heidelberg, and Sarajevo. His movies have also been screened in special programs in Warsaw, Paris, New York, London, Frankfurt-am-Main, Moscow, Kiev, Vienna, Los Angeles, La Rochelle, Riga, Bratislava, Fujisawa, Genoa.

In 1977, his film Advantage won the Silver Bear for Best Director at the 28th Berlin International Film Festival. In 1990, The Camp was selected in the "Quinzaine des réalisateurs" program at the Cannes Film Festival.

In 2005, his film Lady Zee received the Audience Award for Best Film at the Montreal World Film Festival, the Best Film Award and the C.I.C.A.E. Award of the International Confederation of European Art Cinemas at the Sarajevo Film Festival, the FIPRESCI Award at the XIII International Film Festival "Love is Folly" in Varna. In 2006, the film also received the Bulgarian National Film Center award for best film of the year, as well as the Central European Initiative award for a film which best represents the reality of contemporary life in Central and Eastern Europe at the 17th edition of the Trieste Film Festival. At the 10th edition of the Sofia International Film Fest, Lady Zee received the FIPRESCI and Kodak awards for best Bulgarian film. It later received two more awards: Best actor award for Ivan Barnev at the Bulgarian Film Makers Union Awards and the Tolerance Award given by the International Jury Of Critics at 13th Palić European Film Festival. Lady Zee was selected among the 49 films competing for the European Film Awards in 2006.

Djulgerov's last film, The Goat (2009), is based on short stories by Yordan Radichkov.

Djulgerov has also staged theatre productions and directed several TV projects. He is a full-time professor in Film and TV Directing at the Krastyo Sarafov National Academy for Theatre and Film Arts in Sofia, Bulgaria, and a voting member of the European Film Academy.

He was a jury member at the 45th Berlin International Film Festival, the 20th Moscow International Film Festival and the 2005 Molodist International Film Festival.

== Filmography ==
Year	Title	Original title	Notes
1970	The Cooper	Бондарь	Grand Prize, International Short Film Festival Oberhausen
1971	The Test	Изпит	Youth Jury Award, Locarno International Film Festival
1973	And the Day Came	И дойде денят	
1974	The Wardrobe (TV)	Гардеробът (TV)	
1977	Advantage	Авантаж	Laceno d'Oro at the Neorealism Film Festival in Avellino, Italy; Silver Bear for Best Director, 28th Berlin International Film Festival
1978	The Swap	Трампа	
1981	Measure for Measure	Мера според мера	
1975	About Neshka Robeva and Her Girls	За Нешка Робева и нейните момичета	
1986	About the Girls and Their Neshka Robeva	За момичетата и тяхната Нешка Робева	Golden Knight, Palermo International Film Festival
1988	AkaDaMuS	АкаТаМуС	
1990	The Camp	Лагерът	
1994	Chasing Away the Plague (TV)	Прогонване на чумата (TV)	
1996	Paid Compassion	Платено милосърдие	
1996	BG — Unbelievable Stories About a Contemporary Bulgarian (TV)	BG - Невероятни разкази за един съвременен българин (TV)	
1996	The Miracle (TV)	Чудо (TV)	
1997	The Black Swallow	Черната лястовица	Young European Jury Award, Mons International Festival of Love Films
1999	Hour-glass	Пясъчен часовник	
2000	Ad Libitum	Ad Libitum	
2003	Monument	Паметник	
2004	You Are So Pretty, My Dear	Хубава си, мила моя	
2005	Lady Zee	Лейди Зи	Jury Prize and C.I.C.A.E. Award, Sarajevo Film Festival; FIPRESCI Prize and Golden Aphrodite, Love is Folly International Film Festival, Varna, Bulgaria; FIPRESCI Prize and Best Bulgarian Feature Film, Sofia International Film Fest; CEI award, Trieste International Film Festival
2006	The Suitcase	Куфарът	
2007	Recollections of Sea Fishing (four movies)	Спомени за океански риболов	
2009	The Goat	Козелът	
