= Petar B. Vasilev =

Bulgarian film director and screenwriter

- Petar B. Vasilev in the 1970s.
- Born: 26 June 1918; Kriva Bara, Bulgaria
- Died: 30 July 2001 (aged 83); Sofia, Bulgaria
- Other name: Milevin
- Occupations: Film director Screenwriter
- Years active: 1954 – 1990

Petar B. Vasilev nicknamed Milevin (Bulgarian: Петър Б. Василев-Милевин) (1918–2001), was a Bulgarian film director and screenwriter.

He was among the prominent Bulgarian film directors from the last decades of the 20th century best known for his satirical comedies. Most of them obtained a broad popularity and became a classic works of the Bulgarian cinematography, most notably Jack of All Trades (1962), Whale (1970), Farsighted for Two Diopters (1976), Maneuvers on the Fifth Floor (1985) and especially the sequence about The Past-Master (1970–1983).

== Filmography ==
=== Selected Director filmography ===
Year	Film			Genre	Notes
Year	English title	Bulgarian title	Transliteration	Genre	Notes
1962	Jack of All Trades	Специалист по всичко	Spetsialist po vsichko	Comedy	written by Pavel Vezhinov
1970	The Prince	Князът	Knyazat		also co-screenwriter
1970	Whale	Кит	Kit	Satire	stopped by the communist censorship
1970	The Past-Master	Баш майсторът	Bash Maystorat	Satire, Comedy	
1972	The Quiet Fugitive	Тихият беглец	Tihiyat beglets	Comedy	
1976	Farsighted for Two Diopters	Два диоптра далекогледство	Dva dioptara dalekogledstvo	Comedy-Drama	written by Mormarevi Brothers
1978	One Hundred Tons of Happiness	100 тона щастие	100 tona shtastie	Comedy	
1980	The Past-Master on Excursion	Баш майсторът на екскурзия	Bash Maystorat na Ekskurziya	Satire, Comedy	
1981	The Past-Master – Farmer	Баш майсторът фермер	Bash Maystorat Fermer	Satire, Comedy	
1983	The Past-Master – Boss	Баш майсторът началник	Bash Maystorat Nachalnik	Satire, Comedy	
1985	Maneuvers on the Fifth Floor	Маневри на петия етаж	Manevri na petiya etazh	Satire, Comedy	
1987	The Mooncalf	Левакът	Levakat	Drama	
