= Georgi Partsalev =

Bulgarian actor (1925–1989)

- Born: Георги Иванов Парцалев; June 16, 1925; Levski, Bulgaria
- Died: October 31, 1989 (aged 64); Sofia, Bulgaria
- Occupations: Actor, Theatre
- Years active: 1956–1989

Georgi Ivanov Partsalev (Bulgarian: Георги Иванов Парцалев; 16 June 1925 – 31 October 1989) was a Bulgarian theatre and film actor mainly known for his roles in comedies.

Born in Levski, Pleven Province in 1925, Partsalev finished high school in Pleven and studied medicine from Sofia University. In 1956, he was employed by the Satirical Theatre in Sofia. His first film role came in 1958 with Lyubimets 13. Related to the variety and satire concerts of the 1950s and 1960s, he gradually became a legend of Bulgarian comedy with his appearances in The Tied Up Balloon (1967), Whale (1970), Petimata ot Mobi Dik (1970), Three Reservists (1971), With Children at the Seaside (1972), Indian Summer (1973), Bashta mi boyadzhiyata (1974), The Phoney Civilization (1974), Farsighted for Two Diopters (1976), 13-ata godenitsa na printsa (1987), etc. In the late 1960s, he was charged on grounds of homosexuality, in a trial that resulted in the legalization of homosexuality in Bulgaria in 1968.

Partsalev died in 1989 in Sofia, at an age of 64. He never married or had any children and after his death his acquaintances have claimed he was gay.

The community centre (chitalishte) and a street in his hometown have been named after Partsalev. Also, in his hometown, there is a memorial museum, dedicated to Partsalev.

== Literature ==
- Илия Ангелов, „Тъжният клоун Георги Парцалев“. ИК "ДБ Мария", 2002.
- Севелина Гьорова, „Георги Парцалев. Сълзата на Дон Кихот“. София: Дамян Яков, 2005. ISBN 954-527-299-6.
- Иван Келиванов, „На лицето усмивка, на сърцето тъга“.
