= Lyudmil Kirkov =

Lyudmil Kirkov Людмил Кирков
- Born: 14 December 1933; Vratsa, Bulgaria
- Died: 12 December 1995 (aged 61); Sofia, Bulgaria
- Occupations: Film and Theatre Director
- Years active: 1955–1990

Lyudmil Kirkov (Bulgarian: Людмил Кирков; 14 December 1933 – 12 December 1995) was a Bulgarian film director and actor.

== Career ==
Kirkov was among the prominent Bulgarian film and theatre directors from the last decades of the 20th century. He directed some of the most popular Bulgarian films of that time, most notably The Swedish Kings (1968), The Boy Turns Man (1972), A Peasant on a Bicycle (1974), Matriarchy (1977) and the hit film A Nameless Band (1982). He received the Silver Prize for the film Balance (1983) at the 13th Moscow International Film Festival. In the 1975, Kirkov was nominated for the Golden Prize at the 9th Moscow International Film Festival for the film A Peasant on a Bicycle.

== Filmography ==
=== Director ===
Year	Film			Genre	Notes
Year	English title	Bulgarian title	Transliteration	Genre	Notes
1961	The Last Round	Последният рунд	Posledniyat rund	Crime, Drama	
1965	The End of the Summer Holidays	Краят на една ваканция	Krayat na edna vakantsiya	Drama	
1965	Incident on the Dead-End Street	Произшествие на сляпата улица	Proizshestvie na slyapata ulitsa	Crime	TV series
1968	The Swedish Kings	Шведските крале	Shvedskite krale	Comedy	
1969	Armando	Армандо	Armando	Drama	short
1971	Don't Turn Back	Не се обръщай назад	Ne se obrashtay nazad	War	
1972	The Boy Turns Man	Момчето си отива	Momcheto si otiva	Comedy, Drama, Nostalgia	
1974	A Peasant on a Bicycle	Селянинът с колелото	Selyaninat s koleloto	Drama, Nostalgia	
1976	Don't Go Away	Не си отивай!	Ne si otivay!	Drama	The Boy Turns Man' sequel
1977	Matriarchy	Матриархат	Matriarhat	Drama	
1979	A Ray of Sunlight	Кратко слънце	Kratko slantse	Drama	
1982	A Nameless Band	Оркестър без име	Orkestar bez ime	Comedy, Drama	
1983	Balance	Равновесие	Ravnovesie	Drama	
1984	I Don't Know, I Didn't Hear, I Didn't See	Не знам, не чух, не видях	Ne znam, ne chuh, ne vidyah	Crime, Drama	
1987	Friday Night	Петък вечер	Petak vecher	Drama	
