= Gentlemen for a Day =

- DVD cover for the Gentlemen for a Day
- Bulgarian: Господин за един ден
- Directed by: Nikolay Volev
- Written by: Nikola Statkov
- Based on: Gentlemen for a Day by Nikola Statkov
- Produced by: Todor Kolev; Svoboda Bachvarova
- Starring: Todor Kolev; Itzhak Fintzi; Yordanka Stefanova; Stoyan Gadev; Ivan Grigorov
- Cinematography: Krasimir Kostov
- Edited by: Evgenia Taseva
- Music by: Ivan Staykov
- Production companies: Bulgarian Cinematography; Studios for feature films „Boyana“
- Distributed by: Bulgarian cinematography
- Release date: 16 May 1983
- Running time: 87 minutes
- Country: Bulgaria
- Language: Bulgarian

Gentlemen for a Day (Bulgarian: Господин за един ден, romanized: Gospodin za edin den) is a Bulgarian comedy-drama film released in 1983, directed by Nikolay Volev, starring Todor Kolev and Itzhak Fintzi. The screenplay is written by Nikola Statkov based on his short stories “The Outlander” and “The Mister”.

The main character Purko (Todor Kolev) is a poor peasant with many children, constantly starting extravagant initiatives to get out of poverty during the hard times between the two world wars. The only consolation he finds in the music with his clarinet and his inborn musical talent until one day he meets an elegant couple from a town. They promise him prosperity if he mortgages his house and invests the money in their business.

This is the second out of three super hit films, featuring Todor Kolev in the leading role, released during the 1980s. The others are The Double (1980) directed also by Nikolay Volev and Dangerous Charm (1984) directed by Ivan Andonov. The performance by Kolev, with a reference to the great comedians of the silent cinema, received a broad critical acclaim.

== Cast ==
- Todor Kolev as Asparuh Kanchev - Purko
- Itzhak Fintzi as the tax-collector
- Yordanka Stefanova as Purko's wife
- Stoyan Gadev as the priest
- Ivan Grigorov as Mito the barefooted (a fellow-villager)
- Nikola Pashov as the village mayor
- Ivan Obretenov as a fellow-villager
- Trifon Dzhonev as Bay Linko, the tavern-keeper
- Veliko Stoyanov
- Pavel Popandov
- Georgi Mamalev as the engineer Kerkelezov (eccentric inventor)
- Boris Radinevski
- Kina Mutafova
