= Nikola Todev =

Bulgarian actor (1928–1991)

- Никола Тодев
- Nikola Todev in 1973
- Born: 13 June 1928; Devin, Bulgaria
- Died: 30 March 1991 (aged 62); Plovdiv, Bulgaria
- Occupations: Film and Theater Actor
- Years active: 1952–1991
- Spouse: Zlatina Todeva

Nikola Todev (Bulgarian: Никола Тодев, pronounced [niˈkɔɫɐ ˈtɔdɛf]; 13 June 1928 – 30 March 1991) was a Bulgarian theater and film actor.

Todev is best known with his performances of characteristic types most notably the village mayor in The Hare Census (1973), Kara Kolyo in Manly Times (1977) and the uncle in Ladies Choice (1980).

== Biography and career ==
With Itzhak Fintzi and Georgi Rusev in The Hare Census (1973)

Todev was born on 13 June 1928 in the town of Devin, Smolyan Province. He started acting on the stage of Smolyan theater in 1952. Later he moved to Pazardzhik continuing to work in the local theater.

He made his debut in the cinema in the notable film Krayat na Pesenta / The End of The Song (1971) whose screenplay was written by the eminent Bulgarian writer Nikolai Haitov. In 1973 Todev was already amidst the group of famous Bulgarian actors that were filmed in the remarkable screen satire Prebroyavane na Divite Zaytsi / The Hare Census. A year later he became a member of the Union of Bulgarian Filmmakers.

Known with the characteristic types he performs, Todev continued an intensive career appeared in classics as Manly Times (1977), also written by Haitov and the cult comedy Dami Kanyat / Ladies Choice (1980). In the end of the 1980s he was decorated with the high government prize the Order Of Saint Cyril And Saint Methodius.

Nikola Todev died in 1991 at the age of 63.

== Filmography ==
Year	Title	Role	Notes
1971	Krayat na Pesenta / The End of The Song	Fandakliyata	Bulgarian: Краят на песента
1971	Demonat na Imperiyata / The Demon of the Empire		TV series Bulgarian: Демонът на империята
1971	Gnevno Patuvane / Wrathful Journey	Bay Stoian	Bulgarian: Гневно пътуване
1971	Izpit / The Test	Lio's father	Bulgarian: Изпит
1972	Momcheto Si Otiva / The Boy Turns Man	the traffic policeman	Bulgarian: Момчето си отива
1973	Mazhe bez Rabota / Men Without Work	the mayor	Bulgarian: Мъже без работа
1973	Kato Pesen / Like a Song	the black marketeer	Bulgarian: Като песен
1973	Byalata Odiseya / The White Odyssey		Bulgarian: Бялата одисея
1973	Poslednata Duma / The Last Word	the guard	Bulgarian: Последната дума
1973	Nona	Manolaki	Bulgarian: Нона
1973	Prebroyavane na Divite Zaytsi / The Hare Census	Bay Georgi - the village mayor	Bulgarian: Преброяване на дивите зайци
1973	I Doyde Denyat / And the Day Cam	the priest	Bulgarian: И дойде денят
1974	Vechni Vremena / Eternal Times	Spas	Bulgarian: Вечни времена
1974	Zarevo nad Drava / Dawn Over the Drava		Bulgarian: Зарево над Драва
1974	Lamyata / The Dragon	Kalota	Bulgarian: Ламята
1974	Sinyata Lampa / The Blue Lamp	sergeant-major Nedev	TV series Bulgarian: Синята лампа
1975	Svatbite na Yoan Asen / The Weddings of King Ioan Assen		Bulgarian: Сватбите на Йоан Асен
1975	Il Pleut sur Santiago / It Is Raining on Santiag	Spas	Bulgarian: Над Сантяго вали
1976	Voynikat ot Oboza / The Soldier of the Supply Column	the linesman	Bulgarian: Войникът от обоза
1976	Svetal Primer / A Bright Example	the brigade lider	TV movie Bulgarian: Светъл пример
1976	Spomen za Bliznachkata / Memory of the Twin Sister	Stefan	Bulgarian: Спомен за близначката
1977	Mazhki Vremena / Manly Times	Kara Kolyo	Bulgarian: Мъжки времена
1977	Godina ot Ponedelnitzi / A Year of Mondays		Bulgarian: Година от Понеделници
1977	Zvezdi v Kosite, Salzi v Ochite / Stars in Her Hair, Tears in Her Eyes		Bulgarian: Звезди в косите, сълзи в очите
1977	Slanchev udar / Sunstroke	Bay Lyubo	Bulgarian: Слънчев удар
1978	Adios, Muchachos		Bulgarian: Адиос, мучачос
1978	Pokriv / A Roof		Bulgarian: Покрив
1978	Rali		TV movie Bulgarian: Рали
1978	Chuy petela / Hark to the Cock	Zahari	Bulgarian: Чуй петела
1978	Instrument li e Gaydata? / Is the Bagpipe an Instrument?	the barber Ivan	Bulgarian: Инструмент ли е гайдата?
1979	Kratko slantze / Short Sun	Bay Lambo	Bulgarian: Кратко слънце
1979	Byagay... Obicham te / Run Away... I Love You	uncle Dimo	Bulgarian: Бягай... Обичам те
1979	Chereshova Gradina / The Cherry Orchard	Savata	Bulgarian: Черешова градина
1980	Yumrutsi v Prastta / Fists in the Soil	the mayor	Bulgarian: Юмруци в пръстта
1980	Trite Smurtni Gryaha / Three Deadly Sins		Bulgarian: Трите смъртни гряха
1980	Vazdushniyat chovek / The Airman	Beev	Bulgarian: Въздушният човек
1980	Wonny		Bulgarian: Уони
1980	Ilyuzia / Illusion		Bulgarian: Илюзия
1980	Dami kanyat / Ladies Choice	the uncle	Bulgarian: Дами канят
1981	Milost za Zhivite / Mercy for the Living		Bulgarian: Милост за живите
1981	Bal na Samotnite / The Blind Date Ball	Kiril	Bulgarian: Балът на самотниците
1982	Byala Magiya / White Magic		Bulgarian: Бяла магия
1983	Za Gospozhitzata i Neynata Mazhka Kompaniya / To the Miss and Her Male Company	Pero	Bulgarian: За госпожицата и нейната мъжка компания
1983	Zlatnata Reka / The Golden River		Bulgarian: Златната река
1984	Delo 205/1913 / File # 205/1913		Bulgarian: Дело 205/1913
1984	Izdirva se / Wanted		Bulgarian: Издирва се
1984	Stenata / The Dam	the driver	Bulgarian: Стената
1985	Yan Bibiyan	Katzaryat	Bulgarian: Ян Бибиян
1986	Myasto pod Slantzeto / Place Under the Sun	Bay Petko	Bulgarian: Място под слънцето
1986	Mglistye berega / Misty Shores	Stavrov	Co-production:Soviet Union, Bulgaria; Bulgarian: Мъгливи брегове Russian: Мглистые берега
1986	Te Naddelyaha / They Prevailed	Bay Nesho	Bulgarian: Те надделяха
1987	Chovek na Pavazha / The Man on the Road		Bulgarian: Човек на паважа
1988	Vreme na Nasilie / Time of Violence	Stoyko protsvet	Bulgarian: Време разделно
1989	Spirka za Nepoznaty / A Stop for Strangers		Bulgarian: Спирка за непознати
1989	Adio, Rio	Doncho	Bulgarian: Адио, Рио
1991	Veshtestveno dokazatelstvo / Material Evidence	Parvi torlak	Bulgarian: Веществено доказателство
1991	Iskam Amerika /I Want Amerika	Bay Ivan	(final film role); Bulgarian: Искам Америка
