= Ladies' Choice (film) =

Дами Канят (Ladies' Choice)
- the original cinema poster (left) and the new DVD cover (right)
- Directed by: Ivan Andonov
- Written by: Georgi Mishev
- Starring: Stefan Danailov; Georgi Rusev; Nikola Todev; Nevena Kokanova; Tsvetana Maneva; Mariana Dimitrova; Doroteya Toncheva; Yordanka Kuzmanova; Nadya Todorova; Mariya Statulova
- Music by: Georgi Genkov
- Production companies: Bulgarian Cinematography; Studio of Featured Films (SFF); Film Unite Sredets
- Release date: 1980
- Running time: 95 minutes
- Country: Bulgaria
- Language: Bulgarian

Ladies' Choice (Bulgarian: Дами Канят / Dami Kanyat) is a Bulgarian comedy film released in 1980, directed by Ivan Andonov, starring Stefan Danailov.

It is a 1980 Bulgarian comedy film directed by Ivan Andonov and starring Stefan Danailov. The narrative centers on a financially struggling, divorced driving instructor who frequently flirts with his female students across various ages, occupations, and marital statuses, ultimately becoming overwhelmed by the persistent advances of his admirers.

The film belongs to the group of the so-called Bulgarian Cult Comedies Stream that burst out during the first half of the 1980s but starting from the previous decade. Amidst the notable ones can be listed: Something out of Nothing (1979), The Double (1980), A Nameless Band (1982), Dangerous Charm (1984) and the sequence about The Past-Master (1970–1983)

Naturally, the film gave one of the all time famous quotes, as usual by the well-known Rusev and Todev.

== Plot ==
The driving instructor Yakim Donev just divorced his wife leaving her all his modest assets. For giving the assets he is blamed by his uncle every time when Donev visited him. The town in which he lives and works seems to be small and boring, so he initiates dalliances with his female students. There is no matter of age or occupancy, of physical appearance or marital status. All the women who try to obtain a driving license become his suitors. The funny situations file one after the other. From a barely aged 18 girl to an overage fatty Missus, from two sisters-in-law to an unemployed young housewife, from a research worker to an artist's wife. The acts are sometimes spiced by jealous husbands as the lawyer Baltiev. The rope around the neck of the "Don Juan" tightens. Maybe the reason is in him but maybe in the women, all of whom fight for his attention. The chase is over with drama for all of them, with a thin tread of irony.

== Production ==
Production company:

- Studio of Featured Films (SFF) - a Film Unit SREDETS
- Director:Ivan Andonov
- Writer: Georgi Mishev
- Director of Photography: Plamen Vagenshtayn
- Music: Georgi Genkov

Filmed: 1980; Premiere: 15.December.1980
The film was released on DVD in 2000s.

== Cast ==
- Stefan Danailov as Yakim Donev, the driving instructor
- Georgi Rusev as Baltiev, the lawyer
- Nikola Todev as the uncle
- Tsvetana Maneva as Pehlivanova
- Nevena Kokanova as the older sister-in-law
- Mariya Statulova as the younger sister-in-law
- Mariana Dimitrova as Mima, Baltiev's wife
- Doroteya Toncheva as "Number 7"
- Yordanka Kuzmanova as Daneva
- Nadya Todorova as Dimitrova
- Boryana Puncheva as Anna-Dona
- Ilka Zafirova as Stancheva
- Ivan Yanchev as Gechev, the private detective

== Response ==
A reported 1,191,037 admissions were recorded for the film in cinemas throughout Bulgaria.

The film was subsumed among the 50 golden Bulgarian films in the book by the journalist Pencho Kovachev. The book was published in 2008 by "Zahariy Stoyanov" publishing house.

There were the following publications:

- Bulgarian Film Magazine, vol.6, 1980, p. 5 - by M. Balkanska
- New Films Magazine, vol.9-1980, p. 15-18 by E. Gyurkova
- Film News Magazine, vol. 10-1980, p. 3 - by V. Delcheva
- FILM ART magazine, vol. 1,1981, p. 50-53 - by B. Mihaylov
- Film Worker magazine, vol.1-1981, p. 41-44 - by O. Saparev
- Film News Magazine, vol. 3-1981, p. 6-7 - by I. Bozhinova
