= Stoyan Gadev =

Bulgarian actor (1931–1999)

Stoyan Gadev Стоян Гъдев
- Stoyan Gadev in A Cricket in the Ear (1976)
- Born: 12 September 1931; Sitovo, Yambol Province, Bulgaria
- Died: 11 February 1999 (aged 67); Sofia, Bulgaria
- Occupations: Film and Theatre Actor
- Years active: 1955–1996

Stoyan Gadev (Bulgarian: Стоян Гъдев; 1931–1999) was a Bulgarian stage and film actor.

== Biography ==
He is probably best known for the role of Stoil the Haidouk in the popular TV series Captain Petko Voivode (1981) written by Nikolay Haytov. Gadev is also known for his colourful appearances in classic film productions as The Tied Up Balloon (1967), Eternal Times (1974), A Cricket in the Ear (1976) and King for a Day (1983).

Stoyan Gadev started his career on the stage at the theatres of Burgas, Sliven, Dimitrovgrad and Pernik before joining the troupe of the Youth Theatre, Sofia. In the beginning of the 1990s, he was briefly a member of the Municipal Theatre Sofia.

Stoyan Gadev was decorated with the high government prize the Order of Saints Cyril and Methodius.

== Filmography ==
Year	Film			Role	Notes
Year	English title	Bulgarian title	Transliteration	Role	Notes
1964	Mezhdu relsite			Hristo	
1966	Prizovaniyat ne se yavi			Ivan	
1966	Mazhe				directed by Vasil Mirchev
1966	Karambol			Trombonistat	
1967	The Tied Up Balloon	Привързаният балон	Privarzaniyat balon	a peasant	directed by Binka Zhelyazkova
1968	The Penleve Case	Случаят Пенлеве	Sluchayat Penleve	Anton	
1969	Ikonostasat			Stoyan Glaoushev	
1969	Tango			Melnicharyat Milan	
1969	Ptitzi i hratki				
1969	Skorpion sreshtu Daga				
1969	Priznanie				
1972	Treta sled slantzeto			Knyazat	
1973	Like a Song	Като песен	Kato pesen	Neorientiraniyat	
1973	Poslednata duma				
1974	Eternal Times	Вечни времена	Vechni vremena	the general	
1974	Kashti bez ogradi				
1974	Zarevo nad Drava			Golemiyat	
1974	Buna				
1976	Da izyadesh yabalkata				
1976	A Cricket in the Ear	Щурец в ухото	Shturets v uhoto	a truck driver	
1976	Fairy Dance	Самодивско хоро	Samodivsko horo	the accountant	directed by Ivan Andonov
1976	Momicheto s harmonichkata			Niko	
1977	People from Afar	Хора отдалече	Hora otdaleche	Milan	
1977	Zvezdi v kosite, salzi v ochite				
1978	Chuy petela				
1978	Instrument li e gaydata?				
1979	Chereshova gradina			Gorchev	
1980	Yumrutzi v prastta				
1980	Spodelena lyubov				
1980	Trite smurtni gryaha				
1981	Captain Petko Voivode	Капитан Петко войвода	Kapitan Petko Voyvoda	Stoil	TV series written by Nikolay Haytov
1982	Byala magiya			Dancho	
1983	King for a Day	Господин за един ден	Gospodin za edin den	the priest	
1983	Konstantin Filosof				
1984	Opasen char				
1989	Ekzitus				
1990	Indianski igri			Krachun	
1991	Veshtestveno dokazatelstvo			Lovetz	
1992	Vampiri, talasami				
1996	Zakasnjalo palnolunie			Zliyat	(final film role)
