= Katya Paskaleva =

Bulgarian actress

- Катя Паскалева
- Born: 18 September 1945; Petrich, Bulgaria
- Died: 23 July 2002 (aged 56); Sofia, Bulgaria
- Occupations: film and stage actress
- Years active: 1967–2002

Katya Paskaleva (Bulgarian: Катя Паскалева; 18 September 1945 – 23 July 2002) was a Bulgarian film and stage actress.

She is best known for her performance as Maria in the Bulgarian film classic The Goat Horn (1972), for which she received broad critical acclaim. Paskaleva is also known for her roles in the films The End of the Song (1971), Villa Zone (1975), Matriarchy (1977), Elegy (1982), Eve on the Third Floor (1987) as well as her numerous notable appearances on the stages of the Sofia Municipal Theatre and the Satirical Theatre "Aleko Konstantinov".

== Biography and career ==
Katya Paskaleva was born on September 18, 1945, in the town of Petrich, Bulgaria. In 1967, she graduated from The National Academy for Theatre and Film Arts where Metodi Andonov taught her acting. Her career started on the stage of the Pazardzhik Theatre before joining the troupe of the Sofia Municipal Theatre. In 1985, Paskaleva became part of the famous Satirical Theatre "Aleko Konstantinov" in Sofia. Her film debut was in the movie Monday Morning (1966), which was stopped by the communist authority and not released until 1988.

In 2002, Paskaleva died from cancer in Sofia.

== Selected filmography ==
Year	Film			Role	Notes
Year	English title	Bulgarian title	Transliteration	Role	Notes
1966	Monday Morning	Понеделник сутрин	Ponedelnik sutrin	Velko's wife	because of the communist censorship it was released in 1988
1967	Detour				
1971	The End of the Song	Краят на песента	Krayat na pesenta	Nayme	
1972	The Goat Horn	Козият рог	Koziyat rog	Maria	directed by Metodi Andonov
1973	Men Without Work	Мъже без работа	Mazhe bez rabota	Hristina	
1975	Villa Zone	Вилна зона	Vilna zona	Stefka	directed by Eduard Zahariev
1977	Matriarchy	Матриархат	Matriarhat	Tana	directed by Lyudmil Kirkov
1977	Stars in Her Hair, Tears in Her Eyes	Звезди в косите, сълзи в очите	Zvezdi v Kosite, Salzi v Ochite	Liza Strezova	
1982	Elegy	Елегия	Elegiya	the tavern-keeper Zdravka	directed by Eduard Zahariev
1987	Eve on the Third Floor	Ева на третия етаж	Eva na tretiya etazh	Naumova	
