= Dimitar Manchev =

Bulgarian stage and film actor

Dimitar Manchev Димитър Манчев
- Born: July 17, 1934; Sofia, Bulgaria
- Died: January 14, 2009 (aged 74); Sofia, Bulgaria
- Occupations: Film and Theatre Actor
- Years active: 1959–2008

Dimitar Manchev (Bulgarian: Димитър Манчев) was a Bulgarian stage and film actor born in 1934, deceased in 2009.

== Career and Legacy ==
He is best known for the colourful character of Mitashki he portrayed in the Bulgarian hit movie from the 1980s A Nameless Band. He is also known for the numerous roles on the stage, most notably as Kovadzhik in The Pig tails by Jaroslav Dietl, Shtatala in Tarelkin' death by Aleksandr Sukhovo-Kobylin, Mr. Fratyu in Uncles by Ivan Vazov and Orgon in Tartuffe by Molière.

== Selected filmography ==
Year	Film			Role	Notes
Year	Bulgarian title	Transliteration	English title	Role	Notes
1966	Горещо пладне	Goreshto pladne	Torrid Noon		director: Zako Heskiya
1966	Понеделник сутрин	Ponedelnik sutrin	Monday Morning		because of the communist censorship it was released in 1988
1968	Последният войвода	Posledniyat voyvoda	The Last Voivode		
1971	Герловска история	Gerlovska istoriya	Gerlovo Event	Semkata	director: Grisha Ostrovski
1973	Най-добрият човек, когото познавам	Nay - dobriyat chovek, kogoto poznavam	The Kindest Person I Know	Georgi Nedelchev	
1978	Топло	Toplo	Warmth		
1979	Роялът	Royalat	The Grand Piano		
1981	Непълнолетие	Nepalnoletie	Infancy	bay Sotir (Lena' uncle)	
1982	Оркестър без име	Orkestar bez ime	A Nameless Band	Mitashki	director: Lyudmil Kirkov
1986	19 метра вятър	19 metra vyatar	Nineteen Metres of Wind	Ginyo	
