= Under One Sky =

Under One Sky may refer to:

- Under One Sky (album), a 2009 album by John McCusker
- Under One Sky (film), a 1982 Soviet drama film
