= Villa Zone =

Вилна зона Vilna zona (Villa Zone)
- The main characters depicted on the new DVD cover. Yonko (Itzhak Fintzi, bottom) his wife Stefka (Katya Paskaleva), Stefka's brother Mincho Minchev (Naum Shopov, left) and the "problem" neighbour Pervazov (Anton Karastoyanov, above).
- Directed by: Eduard Zahariev
- Written by: Georgi Mishev
- Starring: Itzhak Fintzi; Katya Paskaleva; Naum Shopov
- Cinematography: Radoslav Spasov
- Music by: Kiril Donchev
- Production companies: Bulgarian Cinematography; Studio of Featured Films (SFF); Film Unite Mladost
- Release date: 1975
- Running time: 79 minutes
- Country: Bulgaria
- Language: Bulgarian

Villa Zone (Bulgarian: Вилна зона, romanized: Vilna zona) is a Bulgarian comedy-drama film released in 1975, directed by Eduard Zahariev, starring Itzhak Fintzi, Katya Paskaleva, Naum Shopov, Anton Karastoyanov, Evstati Stratev, Valcho Kamarashev and Georgi Rusev.

The movie presents the popular tradition in Bulgaria, during the last decades of the 20th century, of organizing a feast in honor of just graduated at the school boys who have to join the army as recruits. In this particular case, the event is taking place in one of the so-called villa zones which are located around the towns. A sunny autumn day is gradually covered by the conflicts between generations, between neighbors and between different social statuses.

The film won a Special Prize of the Jury at the Karlovy Vary International Film Festival. Villa Zone is one of the hits of the Bulgarian cinematography from those years.

== Cast ==
- Itzhak Fintzi as Yonko (Emo's father)
- Katya Paskaleva as Stefka (Yonko's wife)
- Naum Shopov as Mincho Minchev (Yonko's brother-in-law, Stefka's brother)
- Anton Karastoyanov as Pervazov (the "problem" neighbour)
- Evstati Stratev as the correspondence student
- Valcho Kamarashev as the cousin
- Georgi Rusev as a friend neighbour
- Stefka Berova as Mihaylova
- Ivan Yanchev as Nedev (Yonko's boss)
- Nevena Simeonova as Nedev's wife
- Grozdan Dobrev as Emo (Yonko and Stefka's son)
