= The Hare Census =

Преброяване на Дивите Зайци Prebroyavane na Divite Zaytsi (The Hare Census)
- new Bulgarian DVD cover
- Directed by: Eduard Zahariev
- Written by: Georgi Mishev
- Starring: Itzhak Fintzi; Nikola Todev; Georgi Rusev; Todor Kolev; Evstati Stratev
- Cinematography: Venets Dimitrov
- Music by: Kiril Donchev
- Production companies: SFF, a Film Unite Mladost
- Release date: 1973
- Running time: 69 minutes
- Country: Bulgaria
- Language: Bulgarian

The Hare Census (Bulgarian: Преброяване на дивите зайци, romanized: Prebroyavane na Divite Zaytsi) is a Bulgarian satiric comedy film released in 1973, directed by Eduard Zahariev, starring Itzhak Fintzi, Nikola Todev, Georgi Rusev, Evstati Stratev, Philip Trifonov and Todor Kolev.

Although the film features one of the most remarkable Bulgarian actors, the biting satire of nonsensical activity made the authority keep the film away from the widespread presentation during the totalitarian system in Bulgaria. In the 1990s, after the advent of democracy, the film came into broad view and became an eminent badge for the Bulgarian Film Art from those years.

== Plot ==
Itzhak Fintzi and Filip Trifonov, The Hare Census (1973)

The daily routine in the village of Yugla is shaken by the statistician clerk Asenov (Fintzi) who come with a mission to take the census of the hares in the locality. He makes the village mayor Bay Georgi (Todev) mobilize the local men in realization of the absurd task. On the very day all the village men are in the field. The mayor, the teacher, the veterinarian... even an old man joins the group.

Naturally all the efforts failed in fulfilling the mission since not a single hare came into sight. The undertaking ends with an open area banquet, with a grape brandy, and wine under a tree. The last episode presents Asenov leaving the village with his small noisy Russian car loaded to the top with fresh cabbage.

== Production ==
Production company:

- Studio of Featured Films (SFF) - a Film Unit MLADOST

Working title: Well-dressed Men

Director:

- Eduard Zahariev has 11 full-length films. The Hare Census is probably the most popular with them and undoubtedly the most mature. He served up serious problems with such an irony and sarcasm developed into generalization about the lack of coincidence between reality and intentions.

Writer:

- Georgi Mishev's dramaturgy became a subject of eminent interpretations in the beginning of the 70s. His screenplays found co-authors as Eduard Zahariev, Lyudmil Kirkov, Ivan Andonov, Maya Vaptsarova who in their own way entered into the unique universe of Mishev's characters.

Director of Photography:

- Venets Dimitrov did his second independent work in this film. He created memorable image of the absurd daily round of those years.

Filmed: 1973; Premiere: 30.November.1973
The film was released on DVD in 2000s.

== Cast ==
- Itzhak Fintzi as Asenov
- Nikola Todev as Bay Georgi (the village mayor)
- Georgi Rusev as the veterinarian
- Evstati Stratev as the village school teacher
- Todor Kolev as the young hunter
- Filip Trifonov as the young engineer
- Maya Dragomanska as Krasimira

== Response ==
A reported 372,813 admissions were recorded for the film in cinemas throughout Bulgaria in the 70s.

The film was subsumed among the 50 golden Bulgarian films in the book by the journalist Pencho Kovachev. The book was published in 2008 by "Zahariy Stoyanov" publishing house.

There were the following publications:

- FILM ART magazine, vol. 11,1973, p. 30 - by I. Bozhinova
- Otechestven Front news paper, vol.9061-05.12.1973 - by E. Vasileva
- Bulgarian Film Magazine, vol.4, 1973, p. 18 - by Ya. Valchanova
- Narodna Mladezh news paper, vol.290-06.12.1973 - by B. Doneva
- New Films Magazine, vol.7-1975, p. 32 - by S. Ivanova
- Trud news paper, vol.282-05.12.1973 - by B. Mihaylov
- Film News Magazine, vol. 10–1973, p. 6 - M. Nikolova
- Zemedelsko Zname news paper, vol. 5-284 - by A. Svilenov
- National Culture news paper, vol. 50–08.12.1973 - by I. Stefanov
- Literature Front news paper, vol. 50–13.12.1973 - by G. Chernev

== Awards and honors ==
FBFF Varna'73 (Festival for Bulgarian Featured Films)

- Second Award for screenwriter Georgi Mishev, director Eduard Zahariev, cameraman Venets Dimitrov, composer Kiril Donchev and the actor Itzhak Fintzi
- The Critics Award with the Union of Bulgarian Filmmakers

Locarno Film Festival'74 (Swiss)

- Second Award by the international jury
