= Boev =

Boev (Bulgarian: Боев) is Bulgarian and Macedonian surname. Notable people with the surname include:

- Nikolay Boev (1922–1985), Bulgarian zoologist
- Vasko Boev (1988–2026), Bulgarian footballer
- Velislav Boev (born 2003), Bulgarian footballer
- Georgi Boev (born 1935), Macedonian physician and politician.
- Zlatozar Boev (born 1955), Bulgarian ornithologist, paleontologist, and zoologist (son of Nikolay Boev)
- Dimitar Boev (born 1957), Bulgarian sprint canoer who competed in the late 1970s
- Georgi Boev (1951–2018), Bulgarian footballer.
- Svetoslav Boev (born 1979), Bulgarian footballer.
- Boncho Boev (1859–1934), Bulgarian financier and economist.
- Boyan Dimitrov Boev (1883–1963), Bulgarian esotericist and writer.
- Gerasim Boev (born Gospodin Yanakiev; 1914–1995), Bulgarian Orthodox bishop.
- Igor Boev (born 1989), Russian cyclist
- Emil Peychev Boev (1932–2013), Bulgarian philologist and Turkologist.
- Krum Nikolov Boev (1880–1961), Bulgarian bookseller and publisher.
- Nikola Khristov Boev (born 1895), Bulgarian major general.
- Nikolay Krumov Boev (1922–1985), Bulgarian zoologist.
- Khristo Boev (1895–1968), Bulgarian revolutionary and GRU intelligence officer.
- Yuriy Alekseyevich Boev (1928–2002), Ukrainian historian.
- Vida Boeva (born 1938), Bulgarian and Macedonian public figure and activist of the Macedonian Patriotic Organization, and personal secretary of Ivan Mihaylov .
- Liza Boeva (born 1978), Bulgarian film director and screenwriter.
