= Mariana Dimitrova =

Bulgarian actress

- Мариана Димитрова
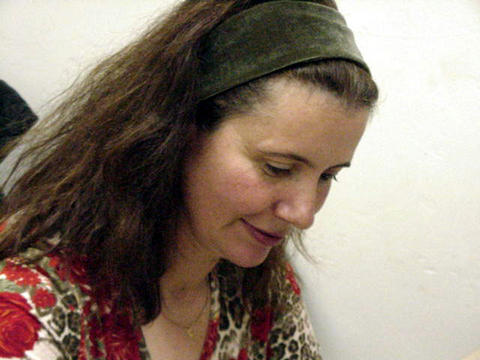
- Mariana Dimitrova in San Diego
- Born: Мариана Димитрова; May 28, 1954; Kozarevetz, Bulgaria
- Died: 1 June 2005 (aged 51); San Diego, California
- Occupation: actress
- Years active: 1978–2005

Mariana Dimitrova (Bulgarian: Мариана Димитрова) (1954–2005) was a Bulgarian actress born on May 28, 1954, in the small village of Kozarevetz, Veliko Turnovo region.

== Life and career ==
She graduated from the Bulgarian film academy. Her second husband was the prominent Bulgarian director Eduard Zahariev. From 1997 to 2005 she lived in San Diego, California.

She played different roles in more than 30 Bulgarian movies, some of the most memorable ones in Manly Times, Ladies' Choice and My Darling, My Darling. She also took part in the Old Globe Theatre play Pentecost and in an episode of Six Feet Under. She wrote two books published in Bulgaria: American Syndrome and Curious Travelers. She committed suicide on June 1, 2005, by jumping from the eighth floor of a building.

== Filmography ==
1. Bird of Prey (1995) (Хищна птица)
2. My Darling, My Darling (1986) (Скъпа моя, скъпи мой)
3. Green Fields (1984) (Зелените поля)
4. Elegy (1982) (Елегия)
5. Ladies' Choice (1980) (Дами канят)
6. Almost a Love Story (1980) (Почти любовна история)
7. Be Blessed (1978) (Бъди благословена)
8. Manly Times (1977) (Мъжки времена)
9. Fairy Dance (1976) (Самодивско хоро)
10. Doomed Souls (1975) (Осъдени души)
