= House Arrest (Bulgarian TV series) =

- Домашен арест
- Genre: Comedy; Sitcom
- Created by: Teo Chipilov; Nikolina Bocheva
- Written by: Neli Dimitrova
- Directed by: Petar Vulchanov; Nikolay Penchev; Stanislav Todorov – Rogi; Grigor Kumitski
- Starring: Tatyana Lolova; Maya Bejanska; Fillip Avramov; Ivan Panev
- Country of origin: Bulgaria
- Original language: Bulgarian
- No. of seasons: 4
- No. of episodes: 86

Production
- Producers: bTV Studios bTV Media Group
- Running time: 25 minutes

Original release
- Network: bTV bTV Comedy (reps)
- Release: 24 November 2011 – 6 December 2013

House Arrest (Bulgarian: Домашен арест, romanized: Domashen arest) is a Bulgarian sitcom aired on bTV and produced by bTV Studios. The series marked the dawn of a new generation of Bulgarian cinema and television. Some critics have said that it is the most successful Bulgarian sitcom. The first season aired starting November 24, 2011 as part of the "Season of Bulgarian TV series". Directors of production are Peter Valchanov and Nikolay Penchev, Stanislav Todorov - Rogi, Grigor Kumitski and writer Nelly Dimitrova. Chief operator Grigor Kumitski.

House arrest is a unique product developed based on the model of American sitcoms such as Everybody Loves Raymond, Two and a Half Men, Friends among others. One of the leading British experts in this genre - director Ben Squirt - was part of the consulting team in the beginning stage of the project.

The series was filmed with HD cameras in 16:9 format, but in his first season was broadcast in 4:3, the second season changes to HD 16:9 format, along with the transition of TV to HD.

== Characters ==
- Mother Emi (Tatyana Lolova) - Emilia, a woman from an aristocratic family, the mother of Anastasia and Emko, mother-in-law of Kotzeto. She doesn't like her son-in-law.
- Kotzeto (Fillip Avramov) - son-in-law of Emi, father of Lucho and Zara. Freeloader of the family.
- Anastasia (Maya Bejanska) - daughter of Mother Emi, sister of Emko, mother of Lucho and Zara, wife of Kotzeto.
- Emko (Ivan Panev) - son of Mother Emi, brother of Anastasia, uncle of Lucho and Zara. He is very smart, but doesn't have many friends.
- Zara (Stefani Doycheva) - granddaughter of Mother Emi, daughter of Kotzeto and Anastasia, twin sister of Lucho
- Lucho (Velizar Velichkov) - grandson of Mother Emi, son of Kotzeto and Anastasia, twin brother of Zara
- Milko (Borislav Zahariev) - best friend of Kotzeto, a neighbor of Kotzeto
- The Blond Bisserka (Magdalena Pavlova) - a friend of Emko
- The Black Bisserka (Asya Yocheva) - a friend of Emko
- The Capitan (Veselin Kalanovski) - Mother Emi's friend
- Raicho (Nikolay Stanoev) - a friend of Kotzeto
- Bat Kolio (Kitodar Todorov) - a friend of Kotzeto
- Elenko (Valentin Goshev) - father of Kotzeto
- István Csurka Yegeresegere (Orlin Pavlov) - Hungarian, was once betrothed to Anastasia

== Guest stars ==
- 100 Kila (Bulgarian Hip-Hop singer) - Zara's Boyfriend

== Episodes ==
=== Season 1 ===
No. overall	No. in season	Title	Original release date
1	1	"New Home"	November 24, 2011
2	2	"Amnesia"	November 24, 2011
3	3	"The new Neighbours"	December 1, 2011
4	4	"Cream rejuvenation"	December 1, 2011
5	5	"Must betray"	December 8, 2011
6	6	"St. Nicholas Day"	December 8, 2011
7	7	"Let it be Kotsevicism!"	December 15, 2011
8	8	"The zen art of knitting socks"	December 15, 2011
9	9	"Crippled, blind and broken"	December 22, 2011
10	10	"The Kotze's Socked Christmas"	December 22, 2011
11	11	"The person - a social animal"	January 5, 2012
12	12	"Dancer of Kotzeto"	January 5, 2012
13	13	"The Borimechka"	January 12, 2012
14	14	"Kotzevi go to a wedding"	January 12, 2012
15	15	"15 years of marriage"	January 19, 2012
16	16	"Kotze vs Rambo"	January 19, 2012
17	17	"Kotzeto's diet"	March 1, 2012
18	18	"To not die"	March 1, 2012
19	19	"Sex and laughter for March 8th"	March 8, 2012
20	20	"István Čurka 1"	March 8, 2012
21	21	"István Čurka 2"	March 15, 2012
22	22	"Sex is not important"	March 15, 2012
23	23	"Kotze's Reality"	March 22, 2012
24	24	"Feeling lucky"	March 22, 2012
25	25	"Gang of Kotsooushan"	March 29, 2012
26	26	"Kotze.net"	March 29, 2012
27	27	"Emko's pet"	April 5, 2012
28	28	"1001 Nights"	April 5, 2012
29	29	"The Gold of life"	April 12, 2012
30	30	"Bitterly"	April 12, 2012

=== Season 2 ===
No. overall	No. in season	Title	Original release date
31	1	"For a 100 earthworms"	September 21, 2012
32	2	"The lesser evil"	September 21, 2012
33	3	"Sisi at work"	September 28, 2012
34	4	"Kotze at school"	September 28, 2012
35	5	"Mother Emi, the Godfather"	October 5, 2012
36	6	"Mother Emi's car"	October 5, 2012
37	7	"Emko's Greek"	October 12, 2012
38	8	"Zara's Boyfriend"	October 12, 2012
39	9	"I want a baby!"	October 19, 2012
40	10	"Bisserka gets married"	October 19, 2012
41	11	"Kotze's Graduation"	October 26, 2012
42	12	"The Little Things"	October 26, 2012
43	13	"Sisi's dog"	November 2, 2012
44	14	"No good deed goes unpunished"	November 2, 2012
45	15	"Of Fish and men"	November 16, 2012
46	16	"Lord of the bricks"	November 16, 2012
47	17	"Pride and brokenness"	November 23, 2012
48	18	"Time of the meatballs"	November 23, 2012
49	19	"Emko and guys"	November 30, 2012
50	20	"Dance of the Marionettes"	November 30, 2012
51	21	"My life is popfolk"	December 7, 2012
52	22	"Tooth Fairy"	December 7, 2012

=== Season 3 ===
No. overall	No. in season	Title	Original release date
53	1	"The spiritual mother of the world"	January 4, 2013
54	2	"Lady Zaza"	January 4, 2013
55	3	"My friend"	January 11, 2013
56	4	"The Shame Games"	January 11, 2013
57	5	"No signal from Zara"	January 18, 2013
58	6	"A crack in the toilet"	January 18, 2013
59	7	"The enemy on my sofa"	January 25, 2013
60	8	"Night with the white feet"	January 25, 2013
61	9	"For the love of art"	February 1, 2013
62	10	"Silence of ducks"	February 1, 2013
63	11	"The homelessness of Kotzeto"	February 8, 2013
64	12	"Kotze End The Kotzcars"	February 8, 2013
65	13	"Pass, counter, recourse"	February 15, 2013
66	14	"The great depression"	February 15, 2013
67	15	"Tic-tac, tic-tac"	February 22, 2013
68	16	"Emko's secret"	February 22, 2013
69	17	"Raicho's sex bomb"	March 1, 2013
70	18	"Beer "beer""	March 1, 2013
71	19	"I'm not bald"	March 8, 2013
72	20	"The Golden Age of Kotzeto"	March 8, 2013

=== Season 4 ===
No. overall	No. in season	Title	Original release date
73	1	"The Kotze's Millions"	September 20, 2013
74	2	"Cousin Uh-Oh"	September 27, 2013
75	3	"Elenko stays"	October 4, 2013
76	4	"100 kila"	October 11, 2013
77	5	"Green Kotze"	October 18, 2013
78	6	"Secrets and lies"	October 25, 2013
79	7	"Kotze doesn't know Sissy"	November 1, 2013
80	8	"Gay Kotze"	November 8, 2013
81	9	"Sisi's Boobs"	November 15, 2013
82	10	"Double date"	November 22, 2013
83	11	"Kotze goes on the cherry"	November 29, 2013
84	12	"Men who didn't listen to women"	November 29, 2013
85	13	"Pet Cemetery"	December 6, 2013
86	14	"Whatever you do, you do to yourself"	December 6, 2013
