= The Goat Horn =

1972 film

- Film poster
- Directed by: Metodi Andonov
- Written by: Nikolai Haitov
- Produced by: Nikola Velev
- Starring: Anton Gorchev; Katya Paskaleva
- Cinematography: Dimo Kolarov
- Edited by: Evgeniya Radeva
- Music by: Mariya Neykova
- Distributed by: Bulgarian Cinematography; Studios of Feature Films; Film Unite Mladost (uncredited)
- Release date: 5 October 1972
- Running time: 100 minutes
- Country: Bulgaria
- Language: Bulgarian

The Goat Horn (Bulgarian: Козият рог, translit. Koziyat rog) is a 1972 Bulgarian drama film directed by Metodi Andonov, starring Anton Gorchev and Katya Paskaleva. The film is set in 17th Century Bulgaria where Kara Ivan's wife is raped and killed by four local Ottoman feudal masters. Having disguised his daughter as a boy, and trained her in the masculine art of warfare over a period of ten years, they set out to take revenge.

The film won a Special Prize of the Jury at the Karlovy Vary International Film Festival. The Goat Horn was selected as the Bulgarian entry for the Best Foreign Language Film at the 45th Academy Awards, but was not accepted as a nominee.

== Cast ==
- Katya Paskaleva as Maria
- Anton Gorchev as Kara Ivan
- Milen Penev as The sheep herder
- Todor Kolev as Deli
- Kliment Denchev as Turkish man
- Stefan Mavrodiyev as Mustafa
- Nevena Andonova as Maria (as a child)
- Marin Yanev as Rapist
- Krasimira Petrova as Mustafa's lover

== Reception ==
According to the Spanish journalist Moncho Alpuente, due to the sexual repression in Francoist Spain, arthouse cinemas were frequented by people expecting to watch more skin than what censorship allowed in commercial theaters. As a result, The Goat Horn was a box-office hit in Spain since the censorship board had allowed sexual scenes.

== See also ==
- List of submissions to the 45th Academy Awards for Best Foreign Language Film
- List of Bulgarian submissions for the Academy Award for Best Foreign Language Film
