= A Cricket in the Ear =

Щурец в ухото
- English: A Cricket in the Ear
- Directed by: Georgi K. Stoyanov
- Written by: Nikola Rusev
- Starring: Pavel Popandov; Stefan Mavrodiev; Tatyana Lolova; Itzhak Fintzi; Petar Slabakov
- Cinematography: Ivaylo Trenchev
- Music by: Kiril Donchev
- Production companies: SFF, a Film Unite Sredets
- Release date: 1976
- Running time: 95 minutes
- Country: Bulgaria
- Language: Bulgarian

A Cricket in the Ear (Bulgarian: Щурец в ухото / Shturets v uhoto) is a Bulgarian comedy-drama film released in 1976, directed by Georgi K. Stoyanov, starring Pavel Popandov, Stefan Mavrodiev, Itzhak Fintzi, Tatyana Lolova and Petar Slabakov.

A comedy with a spice of drama about two young men who live in the country but decide to move to the big city. All the travel turns into a reason for consideration and giving a new meaning to their past and future life. Do they finally arrive in the big city or come back to their village?

== Plot ==
Evtim (Popandov) and Pesho (Mavrodiev), two young men, decided to leave their native village and move to the big city. They bring with them large household goods and an optimism, knowing that they only had good intentions despite their uncertainty, remorses, and nervousness in navigating their new life. From Evitm's scandal with his older brother to Pesho leaving home without a notice to his parents, the two men faced interpersonal challenges of their own. Yet, when standing by the road, amid a heap of luggage, they were met with both a colorful view and the opportunity to witness the beauty life had to offer. Through meeting various cast members in their journey, they experience generous sympathy but also selfishness, exciting waves of true love but also repulsive duplicity. These meetings, in their own way, form their realization about the substantial milestones in the path of life.

== Production ==
Production company:

- Studio of Featured Films (SFF) - a Film Unit SREDETS

Working title: The Three Whishes

- Director:Georgi K. Stoyanov
- Writer: Nikola Rusev
- Director of Photography: Ivaylo Trenchev
- Music: Kiril Donchev

Filmed: 1975; Premiere: 30.April.1976
The film was released on DVD in 2000s.

== Cast ==
- Pavel Popandov as Evtim - the young man 1
- Stefan Mavrodiev as Pesho - the young man 2
- Tatyana Lolova as Vlastnata
- Itzhak Fintzi as Gosho
- Petar Slabakov as Cherniya
- Stoyan Gadev as a truck driver
- Elene Raynova as Toni
- Evstati Stratev as Evtim's brother
- Sotir Maynolovski
- Anton Radichev as a truck driver

== Response ==
A reported 724,444 admissions were recorded for the film in cinemas throughout Bulgaria in the 70s.

There were the following publications:

- Bulgarian Film Magazine, vol.6, 1975,p. 9 - by I. Ostrikov
- Bulgarian Film Magazine, vol.8, 1975,p. 14/15 - by A. Svilenov
- Film News Magazine, vol. 8-1975 - by A. Svilenov
- New Films Magazine, vol.6-1975,p. 6/9 - by I. Akyov
- FILM ART magazine, vol. 12,1975,p. 73 - by N. Rusev
- Cinema Worker Magazine, vol.7-1979,p. 44/45 - by I. Hadzhiev

== Awards ==
FBFF Varna'76 (Festival for Bulgarian Featured Films)

- Second Award for screenwriter Nikola Rusev, director Georgi K. Stoyanov and the actors Itzhak Fintzi and Stefan Mavrodiev
