= Captain Petko Voivode (TV series) =

1981 Bulgarian TV series

- Капитан Петко войвода
- Created by: Nikolay Haytov; Nedelcho Chernev
- Starring: Vasil Mihaylov; Plamen Donchev; Stoyan Gadev; Prodan Nonchev
- Theme music composer: Petar Stupel; Atanas Boyadzhiev
- Country of origin: Bulgaria
- No. of episodes: 12

Production
- Running time: 12x75 mins

Original release
- Network: Bulgarian National Television
- Release: 1981

Captain Petko Voivode (Bulgarian: Капитан Петко войвода) is a Bulgarian TV historical drama series released by the Bulgarian National Television in 1981, directed by Nedelcho Chernev, starring Vasil Mihaylov in the title role. The screenplay, written by Nikolay Haytov, is based on his namesake work from 1974 representing the biography of the Bulgarian haidouk and revolutionary Petko Kiryakov (1844–1900). At the beginning of each episode, the writer himself makes an introduction to the historical facts about the life and deeds of Petko.

The 12 episodes are divided into three parts named: Haidouk, Komitadji and Peaceful Life.

The production was intended for the celebrations of the 1300 anniversary of the Bulgarian state. The series obtain wide popularity. It turned Vasil Mihaylov into one of the superstars of the Bulgarian cinema and theatre of that time.

== Episodes ==
=== Part one Haidouk ===
1. The Revenge
2. The Trap
3. The Escape

=== Part two Komitadji ===
1. Haidouk Tax
2. Russia Arrived
3. The Engagement
4. Topographers

=== Part three Peaceful Life ===
1. Return
2. Meetings
3. Iç Kale
4. The Sworn Brother
5. Petko le, kapitanine...

== Cast ==
- Vasil Mihaylov as Petko Kiryakov (Captain Petko Voivode)
- Plamen Donchev as Little Petko (Petko Kiryakov's sworn brother)
- Stoyan Gadev as Stoil
- Prodan Nonchev as Vangelcho
- Nikola Chipryanov
- Dimitar Yordanov
- Vasil Banov
- Naum Shopov
- Dzhoko Rosich
- Stefan Iliev
