= Naum Shopov =

Bulgarian actor

- Наум Шопов
- Born: Naum Hristov Shopov; 27 July 1930; Stara Zagora, Kingdom of Bulgaria
- Died: 18 April 2012 (aged 81); Sofia, Bulgaria
- Occupation: Actor
- Years active: 1957–2012
- Children: 2, including Hristo

Naum Hristov Shopov (Bulgarian: Наум Христов Шопов; 27 July 1930 – 18 April 2012) was a Bulgarian actor. He appeared in more than thirty films since 1960. His son Hristo Shopov is also an actor.

== Selected filmography ==
Film
| Year | Title | Role | Notes |
|---|---|---|---|
| 2005 | The Mechanik | Vanya Cherenko | |
| 1982 | Under One Sky | | |
| 1981 | Captain Petko Voivode | | TV series |
| 1978 | Toplo | | |
| 1977 | Soldiers of Freedom | | |
| 1975 | Villa Zone | | |
| 1964 | The Peach Thief | | |
