= Don Quixote Returns =

- Russian: Дон Кихот возвращается
- Directed by: Vasily Livanov
- Written by: Miguel de Cervantes; Vasily Livanov
- Produced by: Sergei Bayev; Andrey Certov; Alexander Metodiev
- Starring: Armen Dzhigarkhanyan; Vasily Livanov; Valentin Smirnitsky; Tzvetana Maneva; Stefan Danailov
- Cinematography: Leonid Kalashnikov
- Edited by: Albena Katerinska; Irina Kolotikova
- Music by: Gennady Gladkov
- Release date: 1997
- Countries: Russia; Bulgaria
- Language: Russian

Don Quixote Returns (Russian: Дон Кихот возвращается) is a 1997 Russian-Bulgarian comedy film directed by Vasily Livanov.

== Plot ==
The film tells a funny, but at the same time sad story of the famous Don Quixote, which can make you think about life.

== Cast ==
- Armen Dzhigarkhanyan as Sancho Panza
- Vasily Livanov as Don Quixote
- Valentin Smirnitsky as Padre Perez
- Tzvetana Maneva as Donna Teresa
- Stefan Danailov as Duke
- Stoyan Aleksiev as Nicholas
- Kalin Arsov
- Inna Assa as Young actress
- Lyudmila Cheshmedzhieva
- Velina Doichinova as Antonia
