= Tatyana Lolova =

Bulgarian actress (1934–2021)

Татяна Лолова Tatyana Lolova
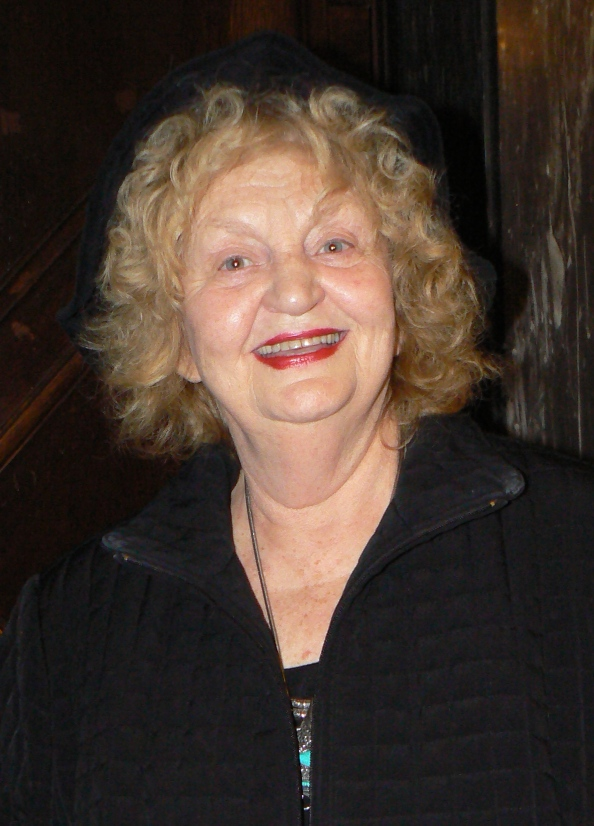
- Tatyana Lolova in 2010
- Born: 10 February 1934; Sofia, Bulgaria
- Died: 22 March 2021 (aged 87); Sofia, Bulgaria
- Occupations: Film and Theatre Actress
- Years active: 1955–2021

Tatyana Lolova (Bulgarian: Татяна Лолова; 10 February 1934 – 22 March 2021) was a Bulgarian stage and film actress. She was best known for her comedy roles that she played for more than 40 years, bringing her the reputation as one of the most popular Bulgarian actresses.

== Biography and career ==
Lolova was born on 10 February 1934, in the Bulgarian capital city of Sofia. Her mother was of Russian-Ukrainian descent. Her father Zhelyazko Lolov was an accountant. Tatyana enrolled in the National Academy for Theatre and Film Arts where she graduated in 1955. After the graduation, she was appointed in Russe Theatre, where Lolova remained until the end of 1956 when she joined the troupe of the newly founded Satirical Theatre "Aleko Konstantinov“ in Sofia. She was one of the original actors of that theatre, along with Georgi Kaloyanchev, Neycho Popov, Stoyanka Mutafova, Encho Bagarov, and Georgi Partsalev. In 1978 she joined the Sofia Theatre, and for 11 years played the role of Gena in Ivan Radoev's play Cannibal(Bulgarian: Човекоядката, romanized: Chovekoyadkata). She returned to the Konstantinov Theatre in 1989.

She died in Sofia on 22 March 2021, from complications following a COVID-19 infection contracted during the COVID-19 pandemic in Bulgaria. She was 87 and was cremated.

== Partial filmography ==
Year	Film	Role	Notes
1964	Neveroyatna istoriya / Incredible Story		Bulgarian: Невероятна история
1968	Chovekat ot La Mancha / Man of La Mancha		Bulgarian: Човекът от Ла Манча; TV musical
1971	Goya or the Hard Way to Enlightenment	Queen Maria Luisa	East German drama film directed by Konrad Wolf
1973	Siromashko Lyato / Indian Summer	Toteva	Bulgarian: Сиромашко лято
1974	Posledniyat ergen / The Last Bachelor	Zara Shishkova	Bulgarian: Последният ерген
1976	Shturetz v uhoto / A Cricket in the Ear	Vlastnata	Bulgarian: Щурец в ухото
1977	Zvezdi v kosite, salzi v ochite / Stars in Her Hair, Tears in Her Eyes	Sultana Syarova	Bulgarian: Звезди в косите, сълзи в очите
1978	Toplo / Warmth	Upravitelkata	Bulgarian: Топло
1983	Bon shans, inspektore! / Bonne Chance, Inspector!	Eliza Karadushieva (Velizar's mother)	Bulgarian: Бон шанс, инспекторе!
1984	Opasen char / Dangerous charm		Bulgarian: Опасен чар
1987	13ta godenitsa na printsa / The Thirteenth Bride of the Prince	Ladylay	Bulgarian: 13та годеница на принца
2003	Journey to Jerusalem		
2011	House Arrest	mama Emi	Bulgarian: Домашен арест
2014	Bulgarian Rhapsody		
