= Todor Kolev (actor) =

Bulgarian actress and singer

Todor Kolev Тодор Колев
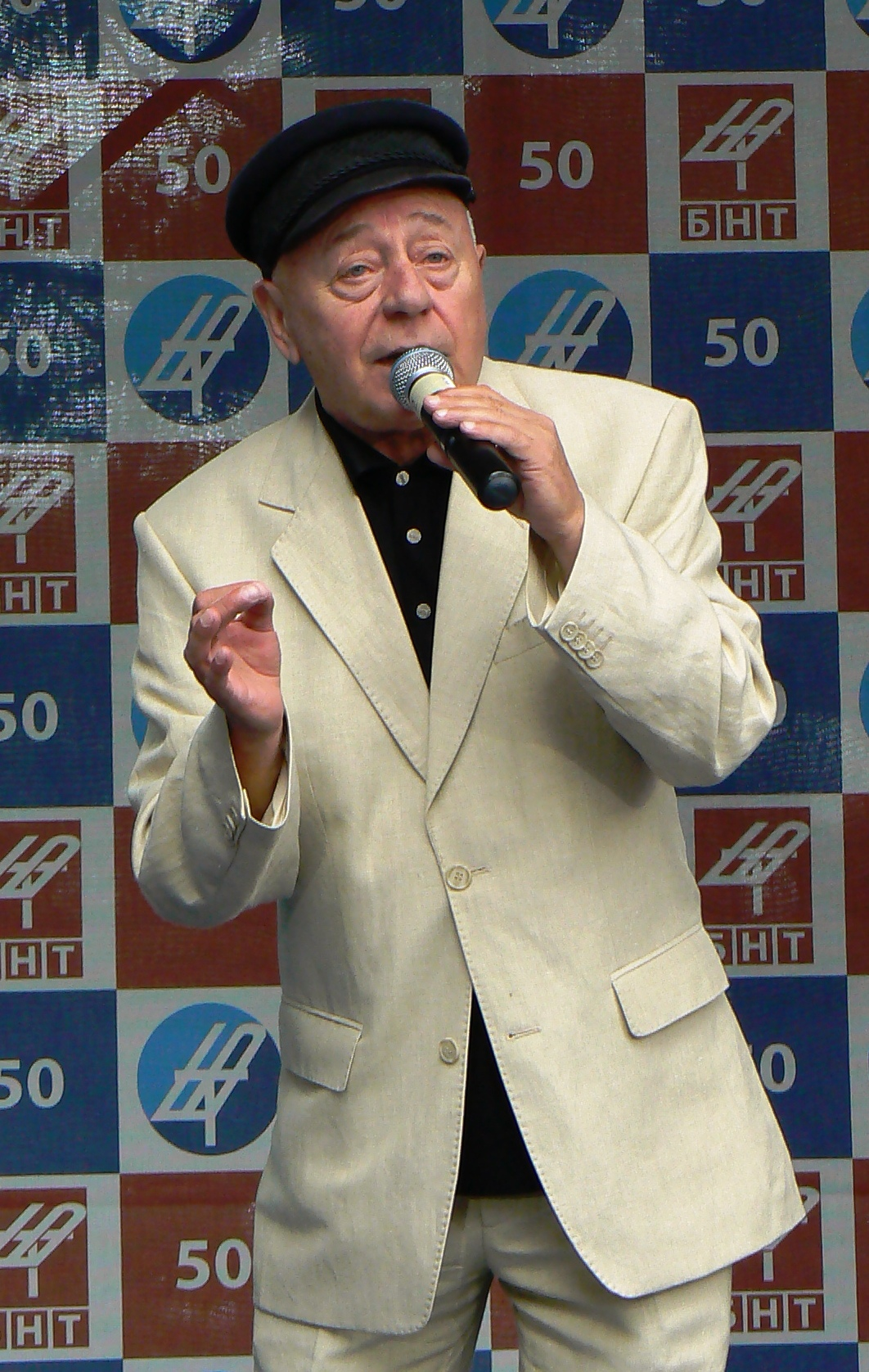
- Born: Todor Petrov Kolev; 26 August 1939; Shumen, Bulgaria
- Died: 15 February 2013 (aged 73); Sofia, Bulgaria
- Occupations: Film and Theatre Actor; Singer and Showman
- Years active: 1965–2013
- Political party: Union of Democratic Forces (1989-1991); Independent (1991-2013)

Todor Petrov Kolev (Bulgarian: Тодор Петров Колев; 26 August 1939 – 15 February 2013) was a leading Bulgarian film and stage actor, singer, comedian and TV presenter.

== Biography ==
Born in Shumen, his first major film was Tsar i General (Tsar and General) in 1966. He has appeared in more than 30 films. He is best known to the Bulgarian audience by his roles in comedies such as Gospodin za edin den (King for a day), Dvoynikat (The Double), Prebroyavane na Divite Zaytsi (The Hare Census), Tsarska Piesa (Royal Play), Posledniyat Ergen (The Last Bachelor), Opasen Char (Dangerous Charm).

During the Communist rule, he was temporarily exiled from Sofia to Sliven for a joke he made in public that there were three Toshkos who made Bulgarians laugh ("Toshko" is the diminutive form of the name Todor in Bulgarian): the Communist leader Todor Zhivkov, the clown Toshko Kozarev and himself. However, in his biography Varnenskoto Sofianche Ot Shumen, Todor Kolev denies having ever said this.

Todor Kolev was a host of the late night TV show "Kak Shte Gi Stignem with Todor Kolev" (1994-1998) and "Free Entry" (1998-1999).

He died of lung cancer on 15 February 2013 in Sofia.

== Filmography ==
Year	Title	Role	Notes
1966	Tsar i general		
1968	Sluchayat Penleve		
1970	Edin mig svoboda	Poruchikat	
1971	Nyama nishto po-hubavo ot loshoto vreme	Worner	
1972	Koziyat rog	Deli	Bulgarian: Козият рог
1972	10 dni neplateni	Kapitanov	
1972	Treta sled slantzeto	Len	
1973	Kato pesen	Kolev, Todor	
1973	Prebroyavane na Divite Zaytsi	the young hunter	Bulgarian: Преброяване на дивите зайци
1974	Ivan Kondarev		
1974	Posledniyat ergen	Tsokov	Bulgarian: Последният ерген
1975	Nachaloto na denya	Zhurnalistat	
1978	100 tona shtastie		
1978	Vsichki i nikoy		
1978	Toplo / Warmth	master-builder	Bulgarian: Топло
1980	Dvoynikat	associate professor Denev, cousin Ivan	Bulgarian: Двойникът
1982	Tzarska piesa	Petar, Tzaryat	
1982	Gde-to plachet ivolga...	Henri	
1983	Gospodin za edin den	Purko	Bulgarian: Господин за един ден
1984	Dangerous Charm	Gencho Gunchev	Bulgarian: Опасен чар
1984	Chernite lebedi	Bashtata na Violeta	
1985	Smartta mozhe da pochaka	Maranzov	
1987	Samo ti, sartze	managing director Milchev	Bulgarian: Само ти, сърце
1987	Chovek na pavazha	Sledovatelyat	
1988	Noshtem po pokrivite	Kosta Rashkov	TV movie, Bulgarian: Нощем по покривите
1989	Bez draskotina	Mosyu Len	
1989	Test '88		
1989	Zona V-2	Bonev	
1989	Razvodi, razvodi...	Saprugat	(Segment 1 Razvodat predi & segment 2 Razvodat sega)
1990	Poverie za beliya vyatar		
1990	Nemirnata ptitza lyubov	Ozheneniyat razveden	
1998	Ispanska muha	Batko	
1998	L'assicurazione	Inspector Meranzof	
