= My Darling, My Darling (film) =

1986 film

- Directed by: Eduard Zahariev
- Written by: Eduard Zahariev; Plamen Maslarov; Alexander Tomov
- Produced by: Angel Nikolov
- Starring: Mariana Dimitrova
- Cinematography: Stefan Trifonov
- Edited by: Magda Krasteva
- Release date: 3 February 1986
- Running time: 107 minutes
- Country: Bulgaria
- Language: Bulgarian

My Darling, My Darling (Bulgarian: Скъпа моя, скъпи мой, translit. Skapa moya, skapi moy) is a 1986 Bulgarian drama film directed by Eduard Zahariev. It was entered into the 36th Berlin International Film Festival.

== Cast ==
- Mariana Dimitrova as Ana
- Plamen Serakov as Ivan
- Ivan Donev as Vlado
- Raya Bachvarova as Raya
- Andrey Todorov as Andro
- Anton Radichev as Mitko
- Stoyan Stoev as Grigor
- Ana Guncheva as Minka
- Bozhidar Iskrenov as Bozho
- Katya Todorova as Sasedkata
- Blagovest Argirov as Blago
- Svetoslav Argirov as Svet
- Pepa Armankova as Pepa
