= Nevena Kokanova =

Bulgarian actress

Невена Коканова Nevena Kokanova
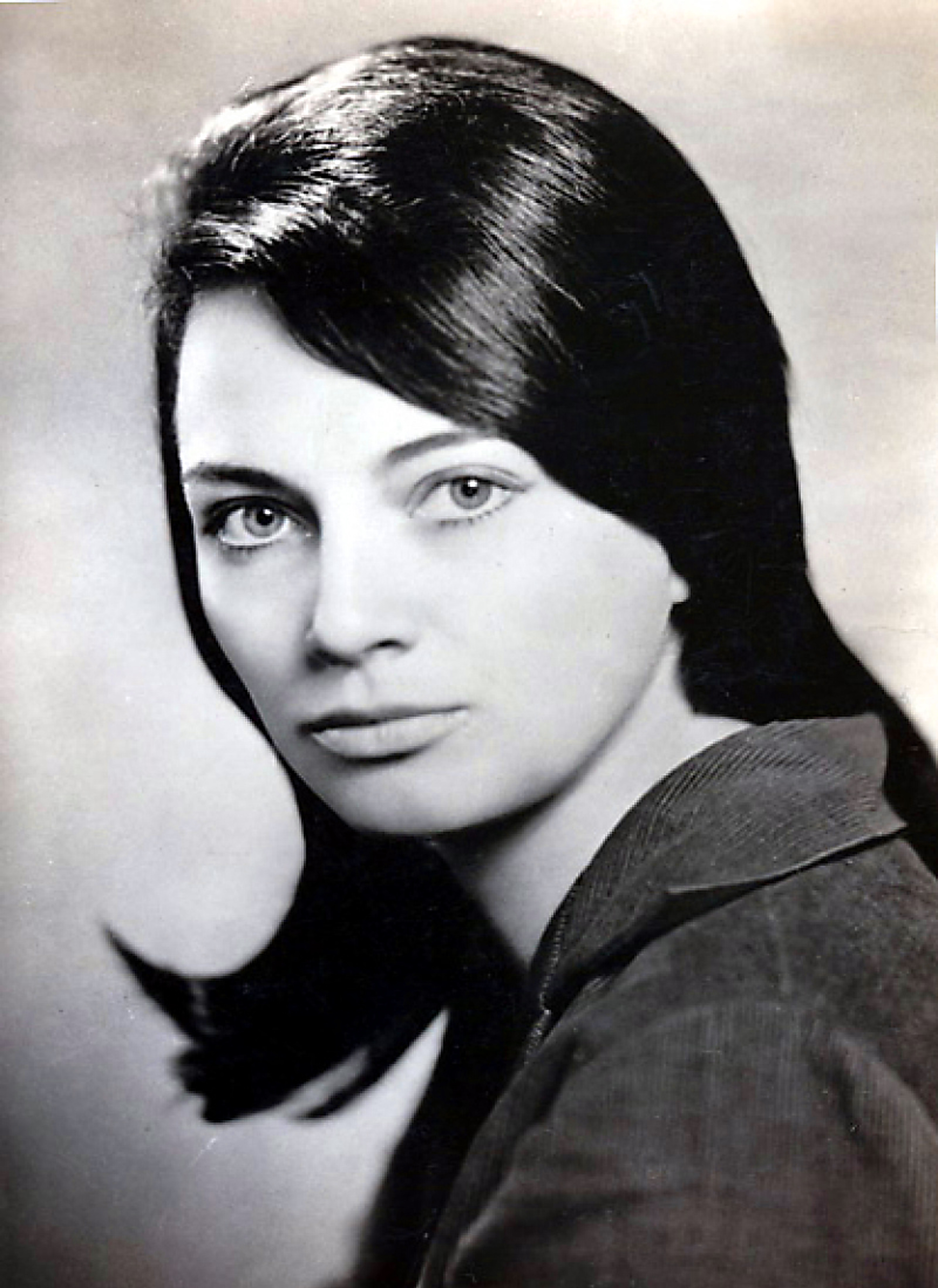
- Nevena Kokanova in 1973
- Born: 12 December 1938; Dupnitsa, Bulgaria
- Died: 3 June 2000 (aged 61); Sofia, Bulgaria

Nevena Kokanova (Bulgarian: Невена Коканова) (12 December 1938 – 3 June 2000) was a Bulgarian film actress. She was known as the "first lady of Bulgarian cinema."

== Early life ==
Her mother was from a well-known Austrian aristocratic family, and her father was a political prisoner.

Kokanova was born in Dupnitsa, Bulgaria and is most renowned for her role as Lisa in The Peach Thief. She started her career at age 18 as an apprentice actor with the Yambol Theater in Yambol, Bulgaria.

== Career ==
In 1975 she was a member of the jury at the 9th Moscow International Film Festival. In 1980 she starred in and co-directed Three Deadly Sins with Lyubomir Sharlandzhiev.

She died in Sofia, Bulgaria from cancer.

== Filmography ==
Title English Title	Title Original Language	Year	Director
The Canary Season	Сезонът на канарчетата	1993	Yevgeni Mikhailov
I want America	Искам Америка	1991	Kiran Kolarov
The Village (TV series)	Селцето	1990	Ivan Terziev
Evenings in the Antim's Inn (TV series)	Вечери в Антимовския хан	1988	Pavel Pavlov
Home for Our Children (TV series)	Дом за нашите деца	1987	Nedelcho Chernev
Time for Traveling (TV series)	Време за път	1987	Nedelcho Chernev
Three Marias and Ivan	Три Марии и Иван	1986	Krasimir Atanasov
Transports of Death	Ешелоните на смъртта	1986	Borislav Punchev
Forest People	Горски хора	1985	Pavel Pavlov
This Fine Age of Maturity	Тази хубава зряла възраст	1985	Hacho Boyadzhiev
Salvation	Спасението	1984	Borislav Punchev
Dangerous Charm	Опасен чар	1984	Ivan Andonov
Constantine The Philosopher	Константин философ	1983	Georgi Stoyanov
The Warning	Предупреждението	1982	Juan Antonio Bardem
Crystals	Кристали	1982	Atanas Traikov
Autumn Sun	Есенно слънце	1982	Pavel Pavlov
The Badger	Язовецът	1981	Pavel Pavlov
Childhood Sun	Слънце на детството	1981	Yanko Dundakov
The Queen of Turnovo	Търновската царица	1981	Yanko Yankov
The Adventures of Avacum Zahov (TV series)	Приключенията на Авакум Захов	1980	Yordan Jumaliev, Milen Getov
Ladies' Choice	Дами канят	1980	Ivan Andonov
	Уони	1980	Vlachislav Ikonomov
Three Deadly Sins	Трите смъртни гряха	1980	Nevena Kokanova, Lyubomir Sharlandzhiev
Alone Among Wolves (TV series)	Сами сред вълци	1979	Zako Heskija
Hark to the Cock	Чуй петела	1978	Stefan Dimitrov
Sunstroke	Слънчев удар	1977	Irina Aktasheva, Khristo Piskov
Matriarchate	Матриархат	1977	Lyubomir Kirkov
Cyclops	Циклопът	1976	Christo Christov
Memory of the Twin Sister	Спомен за близначката	1976	Lyubomir Sharlandzhiev
Burn to Be a Light	Изгори, за да светиш	1976	Nedelcho Chernev
Don't Go Away	Не си отивай!	1976	Lyudmil Kirkov
The Weddings of King Ioan Assen	Сватбите на Йоан Асен	1975	Vili Tsankov
Life or Death	На живот и смърт	1974	Nedelcho Chernev
The Last Bachelor	Последният ерген	1974	Vladimir Yanchev
A Tree Without Roots	Дърво без корен	1974	Christo Christov
My Father the House-Painter	Баща ми, бояджията	1974	Stefan Dimitrov
Children Play Out of Doors	Деца играят вън	1973	Ivanka Grybcheva
The Kindest Person I Know	Най-добрият човек, когото познавам	1973	Lyubomir Sharlandzhiev
Little Tiger	Тигърчето	1973	Mariana Evstatieva-Biolcheva
Affection	Обич	1972	Ludmil Staikov
The Boy Turns Man	Момчето си отива	1972	Lyudmil Kirkov
A Human Heart	Сърце човешко	1972	Ivan Nichev
Circles Of Love	Кръгове на обичта	1972	Kiril Ilinchev
The Strange Duel	Странен двубой	1971	Todor Stoyanov
Messages Don't Murder; 3-part TV movie	Botschafter morden nicht	1970	Georg Leopold, Werner Toelcke
Men on a Business Trip	Мъже в командировка	1969	Grisha Ostrovski, Todor Stoyanov
Tango	Танго	1969	Vasil Mirchev
Galileo Galilei	Галилео Галилей	1969	Liliana Cavani
Perilous Flight	Опасен полет	1968	Dimiter Petrov
The Death of Alexander the Great	Гибелта на Александър Велики	1968	Vladislav Ikonomov
Taste of Almonds	С дъх на бадеми	1967	Lyubomir Sharlandzhiev
Detour/Sidetracked	Отклонение	1967	Grisha Ostrovski, Todor Stoyanov
The Longest Night	Най-дългата нощ	1967	Vulo Radev
Crack-Up	Карамбол	1966	Lyubomir Sharlandzhiev
Before and After the Victory	Do pobedata i po nea	1966	Zhivorad (Zhika) Mitrovich
The Peach-Garden Trespasser	Крадецът на праскови	1964	Vulo Radev
The Inspector And The Night	Инспекторът и нощта	1963	Rangel Vulchanov
Midnight Meeting	Среднощна среща	1963	Nikola Minchev
Tobacco	Тютюн	1962	Nikola Korabov
The Steep Path	Стръмната пътека	1961	Yanko Yankov
Be Happy, Ani!	Бъди щастлива, Ани!	1961	Vladimir Yanchev
On a Quiet Evening	В тиха вечер	1960	Borislav Sharaliev
Years of Love	Години за любов	1957	Yanko Yankov
