= Rio Adio =

Adio, Rio
- Directed by: Ivan Andonov
- Written by: Marko Stojchev
- Produced by: Hristo Yotzov
- Starring: Filip Trifonov
- Cinematography: Krasimir Kostov
- Edited by: Nadezhda Zenova
- Music by: Kiril Marichkov
- Distributed by: Boyana Film
- Release date: 10 April 1989
- Running time: 88 minutes
- Country: Bulgaria
- Language: Bulgarian

Rio Adio (Bulgarian: Адио, Рио) is a 1989 Bulgarian social drama film about the life of an architect, directed by Ivan Andonov. The film is centered on important social themes of self-morality and moral compromise. The film stars Filip Trifonov.

== Plot ==
Stoev (Trifonov) is a talented lead architect whose team wins an international competition for a facility to be built in Rio de Janeiro. Per the terms of the agreement, two members of the winning team (and their spouses) are to go to Brazil, expenses paid, to oversee the construction. All along the design stages, Stoev's understanding has been that he would be going together with his loyal and equally gifted assistant architect. However, the company chief secretly decides to change the terms and go instead of the assistant, threatening Stoev to cancel the whole deal if he doesn't comply. Stoev is left with the dilemma to betray a colleague and friend, or to miss the greatest opportunity in his career (and face the wrath of his nagging overambitious wife). When Stoev is about to choose the former, a mysterious dead body appears in his life, forcing him to take a deeper look into himself and society.

== Release and acclaim ==
The film premiered on 10 April 1989 in Bulgaria. The film was produced by Boyana Film.

== Cast ==
- Filip Trifonov as Architect Stoev
- Vania Tzvetkova as Lena, Stoev's wife
- Petar Popyordanov as Trainee investigator Chocho
- Gosho Popruskov as Associate Professor
- Georgi Mamalev as Anatomist
- Nikola Rudarov as Director Stancho Koev
- Georgi Rusev as Neighbour Bay Slavi
- Natalia Dontcheva as Daughter Vera
- Nadya Todorova as The bookie Tucky
- Latinka Petrova as The curious Neda
- Ventzislav Iliev as The corpse
- Katya Chukova as Daughter
- Nikola Todev as Doncho
- Dimitar Goranov as Stefan
- Pavel Popandov as Waiter
- Anani Yavashev as Investigator

== See also ==
- List of Bulgarian films
