= Under One Sky (film) =

1982 film

- Directed by: Iskander Khamrayev
- Produced by: Alexander Tarkalanov
- Starring: Naum Shopov; Vladimir Menshov; Tzvetana Maneva; Natalya Fateeva; Zoya Kircheva; Dimitar Hadzhiyski; Viktor Yushkov; Olga Lebzak; Andri Yancheva; Mariya Radoslavova; Svetlana Atanasova
- Cinematography: Georgi Georgiev
- Release date: 1982
- Countries: Soviet Union; Bulgaria
- Language: Russian

Under One Sky (Russian: Под одним небом, romanized: Pod Odnim Nebom) is a 1982 Soviet drama film directed by Iskander Khamrayev. This film produced by Alexander Tarkalanov. The film's music was composed by Aleksander Yosifov.

== Cast ==
- Naum Shopov
- Vladimir Menshov
- Tzvetana Maneva
- Natalya Fateeva
- Zoya Kircheva
- Dimitar Hadzhiyski
- Viktor Yushkov
- Olga Lebzak
- Andri Yancheva
- Mariya Radoslavova
- Svetlana Atanasova
