= Filip Trifonov =

Bulgarian actor (1947–2021)

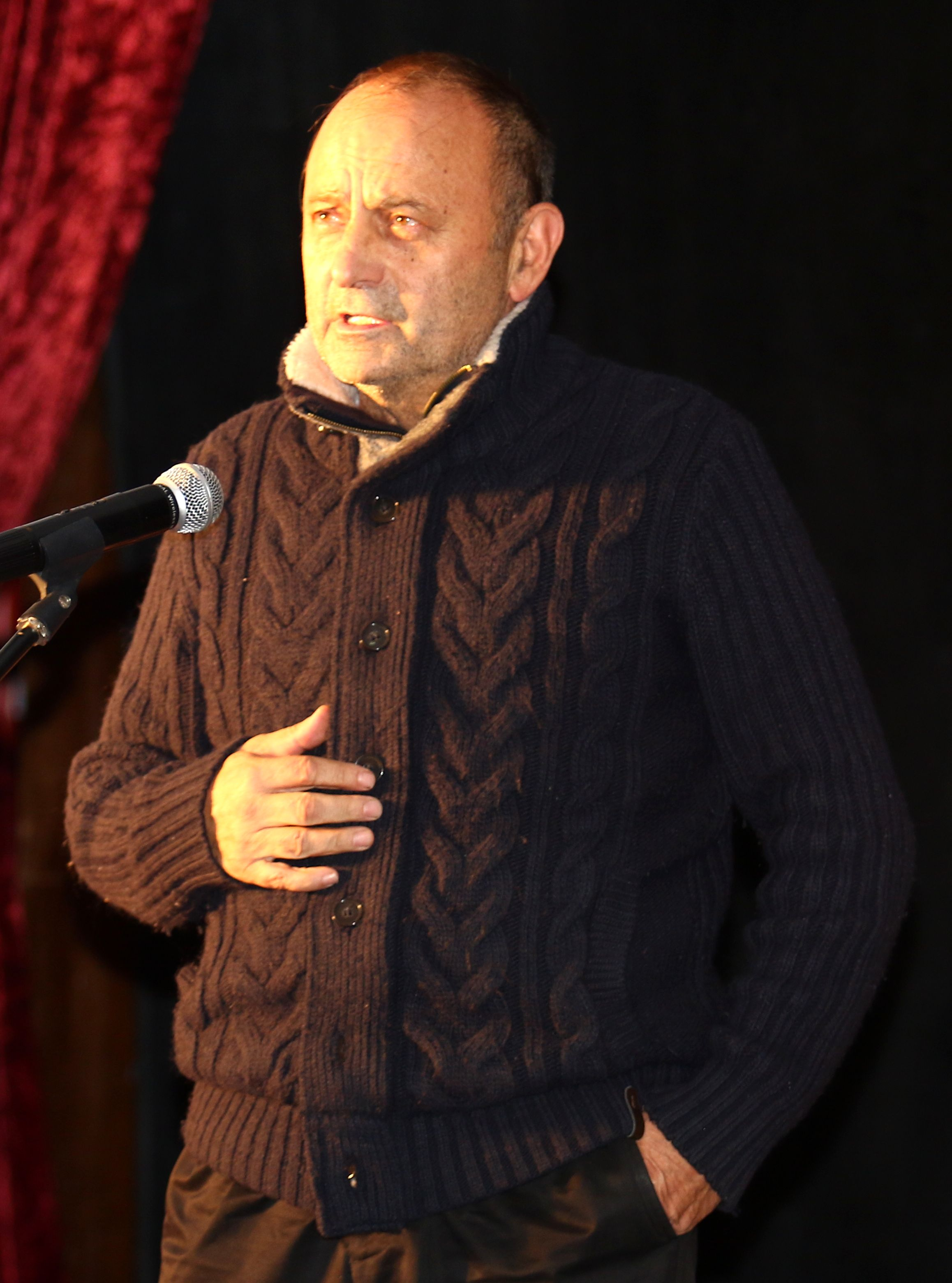
- Trifonov in 2016
- Born: 4 May 1947; Sofia, Bulgaria
- Died: 6 January 2021 (aged 73); Sofia, Bulgaria
- Occupation: Actor
- Years active: 1969-2018

Filip Trifonov (Bulgarian: Филип Трифонов) (4 May 1947 – 6 January 2021) was a Bulgarian actor. He appeared in more than thirty films since 1971. Trifonov's most prominent role is one of his first films The Boy Turns Man, which was released in 1972.

He died of a heart attack at the age of 73 on January 6, 2021.

== Selected filmography ==
Film
Year	Title	Role	Notes
1991	Bai Ganyo On His Way to Europe		
1989	Rio Adio		
1989	Ivan and Alexandra		
1982	A Nameless Band		
1973	The Hare Census		
1973	The Last Word		
1972	The Boy Turns Man		
