= Kaloyan (film) =

- Directed by: Dako Dakovski
- Starring: Vasil Stoychev; Bogomil Simeonov
- Release date: 21 January 1963
- Running time: 1h 47min
- Country: Bulgaria
- Language: Bulgarian

Kaloyan is a 1963 Bulgarian drama film directed by Dako Dakovski.
After a century of Byzantine subjugation, King Kaloyan ascends to the throne, he must implement very flexible foreign policies to strengthen his position. The forth crusade passes through his country and he beats the enemy side in a battle at Adrianople.

== Cast ==
- Vasil Stoychev - Tsar Kaloyan
- Bogomil Simeonov - Milat
- Spas Dzhonev - Boril
- Andrey Mihaylov - Manastar
- Magdalena Mircheva - Chichek
- Tzvetana Maneva - Denitza
