= A Nameless Band =

- Orkestar bez ime - DVD cover
- Directed by: Lyudmil Kirkov
- Written by: Stanislav Stratiev
- Produced by: Radoslav Bozhkov
- Starring: Velko Kunev; Filip Trifonov; Pavel Popandov; Georgi Mamalev; Katerina Evro; Maria Kavardjikova
- Cinematography: Vasil Holiolchev
- Edited by: Michail Kirkov
- Music by: Boris Karadimchev
- Distributed by: Bulgarian Cinematography; Studio of Featured Films (SFF); Film Unite Sredets
- Release date: 1982 (Bulgaria)
- Running time: 112 minutes
- Language: Bulgarian

A Nameless Band (Bulgarian: Оркестър без име) is a comedy movie filmed in 1980 and released in Bulgaria in 1982. It was directed by Lyudmil Kirkov and written by Stanislav Stratiev. The movie describes the life of the young generation in Bulgaria in the late seventies and early eighties. It is about dreams and reality, friendship, love... and something else (the favorite expression of Reni in the movie).

== Plot ==
Vanya, Velko, Filip, Pavel and Gosho establish a band with a lead singer, Vanya (who is the girlfriend of Filip). They hope to make it to one of the big seaside resorts during the holiday season, as a part of their road to fame and success. For the trip they need HiFi equipment and good friends, high enough to arrange them a prestigious place to play. The beginning is optimistic but it soon becomes clear that everything comes at its price. The director of the House of Culture, where they normally rehears, can provide them with everything they need, but with two conditions. First he wants them to play songs with political charge, something they have always refused to do, just for the sheer principle; second he forces them to change their talented singer and friend Vanya with his beautiful favorite, Reni, who is a mediocre singer. They arrive at the seaside hotel, where they are supposed to perform, with Reni instead of Vanya. Here they realize that their "protector" is everything but influential and he has cheated them. So, without a place to perform and without even a place to sleep, they decide to chance their fortune, traveling along the seacoast and performing wherever they can. Finally they end up in a small bar at the beach. Through compromise, flirt, joy and disappointment the buddies learn how to be independent and realize that their friendship is more important than the fame.

== Cast ==
- Velko Kunev - Velko
- Filip Trifonov - Filip
- Pavel Popandov - Pavel
- Georgi Mamalev - Gosho
- Katerina Evro - Reni
- Maria Kavardjikova - Vanya
- Dimitar Manchev - Mitashki
- Nikolay Nikolaev - The Italian
- Zhivka Peneva - Pepi
- Zinka Drumeva - The telephone operator
- Georgi Rusev - Bay Petar
- Ivan Tzvetarski - Peshev
- Anton Radichev - Pepi's husband
- Ivan Yanchev - The photographer

== Awards ==
- Union of Bulgarian Film Artists 1982 Directing Prize
- Union of Bulgarian Film Artists 1982 Film Score Prize
- First Prize for Feature Film, International Festival of Humour and Satire, Gabrovo 1983
