= Anani Yavashev =

Bulgarian actor (1932–2022)

- Born: 18 October 1932; Gabrovo, Bulgaria
- Died: 5 February 2022 (aged 89)
- Occupation: Actor
- Years active: 1959–2022

Anani Yavashev (18 October 1932 – 5 February 2022) was a Bulgarian actor. His younger brother was the installation artist Christo. Anani Yavashev appeared in more than forty films since 1959. He died on 5 February 2022, at the age of 89.

== Selected filmography ==
Film
Year	Title	Role	Notes
1989	Rio Adio		
1961	We Were Young		
1960	A House on Two Streets		
