= The Boy Turns Man =

Момчето си отива Momcheto si otiva (The Boy Turns Man)
- Directed by: Lyudmil Kirkov
- Written by: Georgi Mishev
- Starring: Nevena Kokanova; Philip Trifonov; Kiril Gospodinov; Sashka Bratanova
- Cinematography: Georgi Rusinov
- Music by: Boris Karadimchev
- Production company: SFF
- Release date: 1972
- Running time: 110 minutes
- Country: Bulgaria
- Language: Bulgarian

The Boy Turns Man (Bulgarian: Момчето си отива / Momcheto si otiva) is a Bulgarian comedy-drama film released in 1972, directed by Lyudmil Kirkov, starring Nevena Kokanova, Philip Trifonov, Kiril Gospodinov and Sashka Bratanova.

The movie tells the story of Ran (Trifonov) and his schoolmates, the graduates at the high school in a small town. During the last days as a schoolboy, Ran thinks on the possible roads of the life while walking on the streets of his hometown as if for the last time. Three different women are involved in these moments of quest, consideration and valedictory meetings.

The film received a broad critical acclaim and turned into one of the classics of the Bulgarian cinematography. The song "People and Streets" from the soundtrack to the movie, performed by Mimi Ivanova and Boris Godjunov, became one of the most popular songs of the Bulgarian variety. A sequel, named Don't Go Away, was released in 1976 directed again by Lyudmil Kirkov.

== Cast ==
- Nevena Kokanova as Tinka (confectionery' saleswoman)
- Philip Trifonov as Ran
- Kiril Gospodinov as Tinka's husband
- Sashka Bratanova as Mariana (Ran' classmate)
- Anton Karastoyanov as the managing editor Kamenov
- Vasil Popov as the painter Atsata
- Elena Raynova as the singer Neli Yordanova
- Evstati Stratev as the Ran's father
- Hristina Ruseva as the Ran's mother
- Nikola Todev as the traffic policeman
- Katya Chukova as the headmaster
- Nikolay Lambrev
- Mihail Botevski
- Valentin Gadzhokov
- Krasimir Katsarov
- Georgi Minchev
