= On the Top of the Cherry Tree =

Горе на черешата Gore na chereshata On the Top of the Cherry Tree
- Directed by: Mariana Evstatieva — Biolcheva
- Written by: Rada Moskova
- Starring: Veselin Prahov; Todor Trankarov; Konstantin Kotsev; Anton Gorchev
- Cinematography: Atanas Tasev
- Production company: Boyana
- Release date: 1984
- Running time: 90 minutes
- Country: Bulgaria
- Language: Bulgarian

On the Top of the Cherry Tree (Bulgarian: Горе на черешата / Gore na chereshata) is a 1984 Bulgarian comedy-drama film directed by Mariana Evstatieva — Biolcheva, starring Veselin Prahov, Todor Trankarov, Konstantin Kotsev and Anton Gorchev.

The movie is in the scope of the so-called "Childhood genre", featuring children in the main parts. In some way it is a sequel of A Dog in a Drawer released two years earlier, both films written by Rada Moskova and starring the child actor Veselin Prahov. The main characters are again urban kids and teenagers with busy parents. They wander in the neighborhood in search of stories, usually using their unadulterated imagination. On the Top of the Cherry Tree strengthened Prahov's status as a superstar of the Bulgarian cinema from the 1980s. The movie became one of the hits of that time.

== Cast ==
In the roles of the children are:

- Veselin Prahov as Lin
- Todor Trankarov as Tony
- Tsvetana Uzunova as Ina
- Emil Dimitrov as Emil

In the roles of the adults are:

- Konstantin Kotsev as Peshev
- Mincho Minchev as himself, the violinist
- Anton Gorchev as Tony's father
- Lyben Chatalov as Lin's father
- Rositsa Grigorova as Lin's mother
- Lyuba Aleksieva as Grandma Tsetska
- Pavel Popandov as a dogs trader
