= Anton Gorchev =

Bulgarian actor (1939–2000)

Anton Gorchev Антон Горчев
- Anton Gorchev as Ivan Kondarev in the namesake film (1974).
- Born: November 10, 1939; Sofia, Bulgaria
- Died: June 19, 2000 (aged 60); Sofia, Bulgaria
- Occupations: Film and Theatre Actor
- Years active: 1963–1998
- Spouse: Sonya Markova

Anton Gorchev (Bulgarian: Антон Горчев) was a Bulgarian stage and film actor born in 1939, deceased in 2000.

Gorchev is best known for his performance as Karaivan in the Bulgarian film classic The Goat Horn (1972), for which he received broad critical acclaim. He is also known for his roles in the films Thorn Apple (1972), Ivan Kondarev (1974), Village Correspondent (1974), The Weddings of King Ioan Assen (1975), White Magic (1982) as well as his numerous notable appearances on the stage.

== Biography and career ==
Born Anton Zafirov Gorchev on November 10, 1939, in the city of Sofia, he enrolled in acting classes at The National Academy for Theatre and Film Arts where he graduated from in 1963. After the graduation, Gorchev was appointed in the Varna Theatre for two years. In 1965, he went to Plovdiv and started working with the local municipal theatre. Here Gorchev met his wife Sonya Markova. He returned to Sofia in 1971 and became a regular actor in the Boyana film studios. In 1973, Gorchev joined the troupe of the Sofia municipal theatre.

== Partial filmography ==
Year	Film	Role	Notes
1969	Osmiyat / The Eight	Vlado	Bulgarian: Осмият
1972	Koziyat rog / The Goat Horn	Karaivan	Bulgarian: Козият рог
1972	Tatul / Thorn Apple	Dimo	Bulgarian: Татул
1973	Golyamata skuka / The Great Boredom	Emil Boev / Michael	Bulgarian: Голямата скука
1974	Ivan Kondarev	Ivan Kondarev	Bulgarian: Иван Кондарев
1974	Selkor / Village Correspondent	Dimo Kazaka	Bulgarian: Селкор
1975	Svatbite na Yoan Asen / The Weddings of King Ioan Assen	Teodor Komnin	Bulgarian: Сватбите на Йоан Асен
1975	Buna / Riot	Dobrikata	Bulgarian: Буна
1975	Magistrala / The Highway	excavator operator	Bulgarian: Магистрала
1979	Kratko slantse / Short Sun	Anton	Bulgarian: Кратко слънце
1981	Yazovetsat / The Badger	Taso	Bulgarian: Язовецът
1982	Byala magiya / White Magic	Stoyadin Gerov	Bulgarian: Бяла магия
1984	Gore na chereshata / On the Top of the Cherry Tree	Toni's father	Bulgarian: Горе на черешата
1988	Vreme Razdelno / Time of Violence		Bulgarian: 'Време разделно
