= Georgi Rusev =

Bulgarian theatre and film actor

- Георги Илиев Русев
- Born: 7 May 1928; Kostenets, Bulgaria
- Died: 1 April 2011 (aged 82); Sofia, Bulgaria
- Occupation: Actor
- Years active: 1959–2005

Georgi Iliev Rusev (Bulgarian: Георги Илиев Русев; 7 May 1928 – 1 April 2011) was a Bulgarian actor.

== Filmography ==
| Year | Film | Role | Notes |
|---|---|---|---|
| 1966 | Nachaloto na Edna Vakantsiya / The Start of the Summer Holidays | | Bulgarian: Началото на една ваканция |
| 1967 | Nay-dalgata nosht / The Longest Night | a policeman | Bulgarian: Най-дългата нощ |
| 1969 | Priznanie / Confession | | Bulgarian: Признание |
| 1971 | Ne se Obrashtay Nazad / Don't Turn Back | Bay Mirko | Bulgarian: Не се обръщай назад |
| 1971 | Demonat na Imperiyata / The Demon of the Empire | | TV series Bulgarian: Демонът на империята |
| 1972 | Glutnitsata / The Pack of Wolves | the press-man | Bulgarian: Глутницата |
| 1973 | Kato Pesen / Like a Song | | Bulgarian: Като песен |
| 1973 | Opak Chovek / Maverick | | Bulgarian: Опак човек |
| 1973 | Prebroyavane na Divite Zaytsi / The Hare Census | the veterinarian | Bulgarian: Преброяване на дивите зайци |
| 1973 | Detsa Igrayat Van / Children Play Out of Doors | | Bulgarian: Деца играят вън |
| 1974 | Vechni Vremena / Eternal Times | | Bulgarian: Вечни времена |
| 1974 | Zarevo nad Drava / Dawn Over the Drava | | Bulgarian: Зарево над Драва |
| 1974 | Izpiti po Nikoe Vreme / Exams at Any Odd Time | Penchev, Mitko's father | Bulgarian: Изпити по никое време |
| 1974 | Na Chisto / Squared Accounts | a Dimitar's friend | Bulgarian: На чисто |
| 1974 | Selyaninat s Koleloto / A Peasant on a Bicycle | Docho Bulgurov | Bulgarian: Селянинът с колелото |
| 1975 | Tozi hubav zhivot / This Wonderful Life | Terziev | Bulgarian: Този хубав живот |
| 1975 | Wilna Zona / Villa Zone | a neighbour | Bulgarian: Вилна зона |
| 1975 | Buna / Riot | | Bulgarian: Буна |
| 1975 | Sledovatelyat i gorata / Judge and the Forest | Stoyan | Bulgarian: Следователят и гората |
| 1976 | Da izyadesh yabalkata / To Eat the Apple | | Bulgarian: Да изядеш ябълката |
| 1976 | Ne Si Otivay! / Don't Go Away | Vetev | sequel of The Boy Turns Man; Bulgarian: Не си отивай! |
| 1976 | Svetal Primer / A Bright Example | Dimov, the headmaster of the school | TV; Bulgarian: Светъл пример |
| 1976 | Samodivsko horo / Fairy Dance | the gallery man | Bulgarian: Самодивско хоро |
| 1977 | Matriarhat / Matriarchy | Boychev | Bulgarian: Матриархат |
| 1978 | Nechista sila / Evil Powers | | TV series Bulgarian: Нечиста сила |
| 1978 | Panteley | | Bulgarian: Пантелей |
| 1978 | Pokriv / A Roof | | Bulgarian: Покрив |
| 1979 | Filyo and Makenzen | | TV series Bulgarian: Фильо и Макензен |
| 1979 | Chereshova Gradina / The Cherry Orchard | Pauncho | Bulgarian: Черешова градина |
| 1980 | S podelena lyubov / With Shared Love | Kolev | Bulgarian: С поделена любов |
| 1980 | Dvoynikat / The Double | the general executive | Bulgarian: Двойникът |
| 1980 | Ilyuzia / Illusion | | Bulgarian: Илюзия |
| 1980 | Dami kanyat / Ladies' Choice | Baltiev, the lawyer | TV; Bulgarian: Дами канят |
| 1981 | Udarat / The Thrust | | Bulgarian: Ударът |
| 1982 | Ritsaryat na byalata dama / The Knight of the White Lady | | TV series Bulgarian: Рицарят на бялата дама |
| 1982 | Orkestar bez ime / A Nameless Band | Bay Petar | Bulgarian: Оркестър без име |
| 1983 | Hotel Central | | Bulgarian: Хотел Централ |
| 1984 | Opasen char / Dangerous Charm | | Bulgarian: Опасен чар |
| 1985 | Grehat na Maltitza / Sin of Maltitza | | Bulgarian: Грехът на Малтица |
| 1986 | Vasko de Gama ot selo Rupcha / Vasko de Gama from Rupcha Village | Maykata, the cook | TV series Bulgarian: Васко де Гама от село Рупча |
| 1986 | Strastna Nedelya / Holy Week | the mayor | Bulgarian: Страстна Неделя |
| 1987 | 13ta godenitsa na printsa / The Thirteenth Bride of the Prince | The English Teacher | Bulgarian: 13та годеница на принца |
| 1987 | Chovek na pavazha / The Man on the Road | the dispatcher | Bulgarian: Човек на паважа |
| 1987 | Vreme za pat / Time for Traveling | a technician | TV series Bulgarian: Време за път |
| 1988 | Vchera / Yesterday | Tsonchev, the head of the school | Bulgarian: Вчера |
| 1988 | Sasedkata / The Neighbour | the general executive | Bulgarian: Съседката |
| 1988 | Izlozhenie / Report | | Bulgarian: Изложение |
| 1989 | Adio, Rio | Bay Slavi, the neighbour | Bulgarian: Адио, Рио |
| 1989 | Zaplahata / The Threat | the general executive | Bulgarian: Заплахата |
| 1989 | Zone V-2 | Longurov | Bulgarian: Зона В-2 |
| 1989 | Razvodi, razvodi... / Divorces, Divorces... | a chairman of the court | Bulgarian: Разводи, разводи... |

== Bibliography ==
- Bulgarian National Film Archive (in English)
- Actors Biography
- Standart newspaper interview (in Bulgarian)
