= Metodi Andonov =

Bulgarian film director

- Born: 16 March 1932; Kalishte, Bulgaria
- Died: 12 April 1974 (aged 42); Sofia, Bulgaria
- Occupation: Film director
- Years active: 1968-1973

Metodi Andonov (Bulgarian: Методи Андонов; 16 March 1932 – 12 April 1974) was a Bulgarian film director.

== Selected filmography ==
- Byalata staya (1968)
- Nyama nishto po-hubavo ot loshoto vreme (1971)
- The Goat Horn (1972)
- Golyamata skuka (1973)
