= The Last Word (1973 film) =

1973 film

- Directed by: Binka Zhelyazkova
- Written by: Stefan Tsanev; Binka Zhelyazkova
- Produced by: Nikola Velev
- Starring: Iana Guirova
- Cinematography: Boris Yanakiev
- Edited by: Madlena Dyakova
- Release date: 7 September 1973
- Running time: 118 minutes
- Country: Bulgaria
- Language: Bulgarian

The Last Word (Bulgarian: Последната дума, translit. Poslednata duma) is a 1973 Bulgarian drama film directed by Binka Zhelyazkova. It was entered into the 1974 Cannes Film Festival.

== Cast ==
- Iana Guirova - Ana
- Tzvetana Maneva - Uchitelkata
- Aneta Petrovska - Chernata Maria
- Emilia Radeva - Shivachkata
- Leda Taseva - Vera Stoyanova
- Dorotea Toncheva - Studentkata
- Bella Tsoneva - Yana
- Nikolay Binev - Sledovatelyat
- Itzhak Finzi - Sveshtenikat
- Nikola Todev - Strazharyat
- Elena Mirchovska - Uchenichka
- Maria Statoulova - Uchenichka
- Filip Trifonov - Studentat
- Katya Dineva
- Milka Popangelova

== Plot ==
The seven women inmates in Poslednata Duma are imprisoned because they have been associated with partisans opposing the fascist puppet government of the German Nazis. Each of them has the power to save herself if she will betray the others, and each bravely refuses to do so, even though it means they all will die. Despite their grim situation, and the atrocities perpetuated on them as political prisoners, they manage to laugh, and even celebrate a festival.
