= Liza Boeva =

Bulgarian film director and art lecturer

Elizaveta (Liza) Boeva
- Лиза Боева
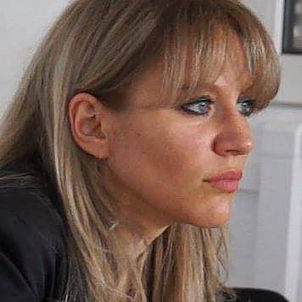
- Born: 22 August 1978 (age 47); Sofia, Bulgaria
- Education: Italian Lyceum, Sofia
- Alma mater: Saint Petersburg State University; National Academy for Theatre and Film Arts; New Bulgarian University
- Occupations: film director; screenwriter; lecturer on History of Art; associate professor
- Spouse: Izko Finzi
- Children: Matilda
- Website: www.filizi33.com

Liza Boeva (Bulgarian: Лиза Боева) is a Bulgarian film director and screenwriter. She lectures on the history of arts and co-founded the educational platform Filizi 33. Boeva is also a member of the European Film Academy. Her documentary William Shakespeare: The Most Famous Person Who Never Existed was noted by the Shakespeare Authorship Coalition in connection with the Shakespeare authorship question. In 2026, she was selected as a Golden Globes Voter for the Golden Globe Awards.

== Early life and education ==
Elizaveta (Liza) Boeva (born 22 August 1978 in Sofia, Bulgaria) completed her secondary education at the Italian Lyceum in Sofia in 1997. She earned a master's degree in Journalism and Public Relations in 2001 and another in History of Arts in 2003 at the Saint Petersburg State University in Russia. She received a master's degree in Film and TV Directing in 2006 from the National Academy for Theatre and Film Arts in Sofia, Bulgaria.

Since 2006, Liza Boeva has lectured on the history of arts in Europe and the United States, with a focus on the Italian and Northern Renaissance. She has been a lecturer at the New Bulgarian University since 2011. In the same year, she received her PhD with a dissertation on the Beat Generation. In 2016, Boeva was promoted to associate professor. She has also been a guest lecturer at institutions such as Varna Free University Chernorizets Hrabar, as well as at cultural centers, museums, and art galleries

== Career ==
=== Film career ===
She is a screenwriter and director of documentaries and feature films, recognized with international awards. Among them: The Summer of Mona Lisa (the movie was bought for broadcasting by the Bulgarian National Television. I was Jack Kerouac, William Shakespeare: The Most Famous Person Who Never Existed. The movie was bought for broadcasting by the Bulgarian National Television.

=== Educational work ===
In 2017 she created (alongside the actor Izko Finzi) the educational platform on History of Arts Filizi 33. Some of the recent courses are on: Italian and Northern Renaissance, Hieronymus Bosch, Pieter Brueghel The Elder, Franz Kafka, Oscar Wilde.

Liza Boeva is the author and lecturer of The Artists, a regular arts feature broadcast on Bulgarian National Television (BNT 1) as part of the programme The Day Begins with Culture.

She is the creator and host of the original radio programme Italy Through the Ages: An Anniversary Series Dedicated to the Italian Artists Who Shaped Europe's Cultural Identity, a joint production of the educational platform Filizi 33 and Bulgarian National Radio's Hristo Botev Programme.

Liza Boeva is the author and host of Italy on Screen: An Anniversary Series Dedicated to Great Film Directors, a joint project of the educational platform Filizi 33 and the Union of Bulgarian Filmmakers.

=== Publications ===
Boeva is also the author of articles and critical reviews on the history of arts.

== Filmography (selected) ==
Work title	Year	References
The Garden of Earthly Delights. Eden	2023	
William Shakespeare: The Most Famous Person Who never Existed	2018	
William Shakespeare. Fragments of plays	2016	
Donkey's Tail	2014	
I was Jack Kerouac	2014	
The Summer of Mona Lisa	2013	
Cosmos	2013	
Vera	2012	

== Director of Theatrical Performances (selected) ==
Title	Date / Venue	References
Who's Like Me! — starring Izko Finzi	7 June 2025, National Palace of Culture	
From my point of view — starring Izko Finzi	21 December 2024, National Palace of Culture	
Jubilee of Izko Finzi — starring Izko Fintzi	25 April 2023, National Palace of Culture	
Master and Margarita. Bulgakov and the Authority — lecture-spectacle (starring Izko Finzi)	20 November 2022, The Little City Theatre 'Off The Channel'	
The Black Square of Malevich — lecture-spectacle (starring Izko Finzi)	28 November 2021, The Little City Theatre 'Off The Channel'	
All the worlds' a stage — spectacle (starring Izko Finzi, Georgi Mihaylov, conductor Nayden Todorov with Sofia Philharmonic)	11 October 2018, Bulgaria Concert Hall	
Who killed Romeo and Juliet? — lecture-spectacle (starring Izko Finzi)	14 October 2018, City Art Marc Center	

== Bibliography (selected) ==
- The Beat Generation and Hippies. America, 1947–1972. Sofia, 2011. Published by: Avangard Prima. ISBN 978-954-323-904-7
- The William Shakespeare Project. Sofia, 2019. Published by: Filizi 33
- Franz Kafka. 'Metamorphosis'. A directors' analysis. Sofia, 2024. Published by: Filizi 33. ISBN 978-619-92797-2-4

== Family ==
Elizaveta (Liza) Boeva was born August 22^{nd} 1978 in Sofia in the family of the engineers Liubov and Plamen Boev. She has a younger brother Boris Boev, PhD on History, awarded with the First Prize "St. Paisiy Hilendarski" state award from the Union of Scientists in Bulgaria (2020) and with the Third Prize "Young Scientist of the Year" (2022)

In 2011 she married the actor Izko Finzi. Their daughter Matilda was born in 2017.

== See also ==
- Izko Finzi
- History of art
- Beat Generation
- European Film Academy
- Shakespeare authorship question
- National Academy for Theatre and Film Arts
