= Tzvetana Maneva =

Bulgarian actress (born 1944)

Tzvetana Georgieva Maneva (Bulgarian: Цветана Георгиева Манева) (born in Plovdiv, Bulgaria on 30 January 1944) is a Bulgarian actress. She was born in Plovdiv and her artistic career started there. The eminent Bulgarian actress made her debut in cinema in the 1960s and has appeared in more than 50 Bulgarian films.

Her parents are Nadejda Maneva and Georgi Manev. Her sister is Maria Kolarova, née Maneva.

== Selected filmography ==
- Kaloyan (1963)
- The Swedish Kings (1968)
- The Last Word (1973)
- The Swimming Pool (1977)
- Don Quixote Returns (1996)
- Pod Prikritie (2011 - 2016)
