= Dangerous Charm =

Opasen char
- Directed by: Ivan Andonov
- Written by: Svoboda Bachvarova
- Produced by: Stoyan Keremedchiev
- Starring: Todor Kolev; Georgi Rusev; Nevena Kokanova; Nadya Todorova; Tatyana Lolova; Stefan Mavrodiyev
- Cinematography: Plamen Vagenshtain
- Edited by: Teodora Vepshek
- Music by: Georgi Genkov
- Distributed by: BNT, Boyana Film
- Release date: 18 June 1984
- Running time: 87 minutes
- Country: Bulgaria
- Language: Bulgarian

Opasen char (Bulgarian: Опасен чар, lit. 'Dangerous charm') is a comedy/crime film released in Bulgaria in 1984. It was directed by Ivan Andonov and written by Svoboda Bachvarova. The story is about a highly educated and charming gentleman, who is actually a brilliant con artist, who robs naïve women. He constantly changes his name, his exploits are countless and his life is one everlasting adventure.

== Plot ==
Born with the plain name Gencho Gunchev and with the soul of an adventurer, he cannot settle with the daily grind of a clerk. Using his charm, Gunchev begins relationships with rich women and after that disappears with their money.

Pretending to be the famous freelance architect Yastrebovski, he wrings a huge amount of money out of a group of naïve people. The swindling is caught in a bar where he squanders the money of those people. Even though he is well-known to the police with all his reincarnations (see Special notes at the end), he manages to provoke sympathy in the inspector in charge (Tsvetan). Simulating an illness, Gunchev is hospitalized, and in the hospital he manages to forge his death certificate. Then he goes to Bourgas in a search for his next victim. There he meets the intelligent and sensitive teacher Boryana and they both fall in love with each other. But soon, realizing he will be caught, Gunchev escapes from Boryana, taking only a picture of her.

Again in Sofia, not without the help of providence, he manages to steal a uniform of a police captain, which turns out to be Tsvetan's. By accident he catches a man (Sedlarov) who has an illegal workshop in his house. Gunchev accepts the bribe from Sedlarov and, true to his nature, offers to marry his daughter, Sevelina. Under the name Iliya Burevestnikov he blackmails all illegal private contractors in the area and incidentally comes across one of his ex-wives. His identity is uncovered and he finds himself again in custody. The only thing he requests from the inspectors before going in jail is the picture of Boryana.

== Cast ==
- Todor Kolev as Gencho Gunchev (Yastrebovski, Orelski, Pelikanski, Sokolov, Radul Misirkov, Iliya Burevestnikov)
- Nevena Kokanova as Boryana
- Stefan Mavrodiyev as Tzvetan, inspector
- Lyuben Chatalov as Inspector Boychinov
- Georgi Rusev as Kolyu Sedlarov
- Tatyana Lolova as Leda
- Nadya Todorova as Mimi Sedlarova
- Tzvetana Maneva as Inspector Vateva
- Margarita Karamiteva as Sevelina, the daughter of Kolyu Sedlarov
- Petar Slabakov as Inspector Peshanov

== Awards ==
Grand Prix of the International TV Film Festival Teleconfronto di Chinciano Terme, Italy, 1985
Special Award of the Festival International de film d’humour de Chamrousse, France, 1988
The Award for Male Act given to Todor Kolev at the International Comedy and Satirical Film Festival, Gabrovo, 1985
The Best Script Award of the Union of Bulgarian Filmmakers for Svoboda Bachvarova.

== Special notes ==
All characters of Gunchev adopt family names that are derived from the name of a bird.

- Yastrebovski - comes from the Bulgarian for hawk, which is pronounced as "yastreb"
- Orelski - comes from the Bulgarian for eagle, which is pronounced as "orel"
- Pelikanski - comes from pelican
- Sokolov - comes from the Bulgarian for falcon, which is pronounced as "sokol"
- Misirkov - comes from the Bulgarian for turkey, which is pronounced as "misirka" (dialect)
- Burevestnikov - comes from the Bulgarian for petrel, which is pronounced as "burevestnik"

== See also ==
- List of Bulgarian films
