= Velko Kanev =

Bulgarian actor (1948–2011)

Velko Kanev Велко Кънев
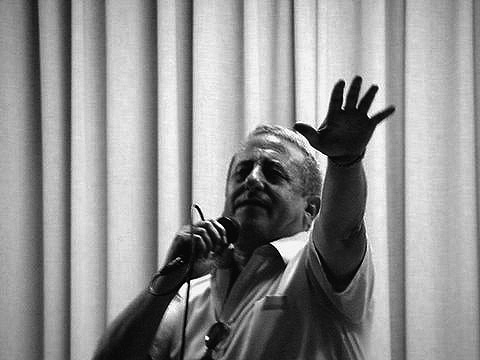
- Born: 31 July 1948; Elhovo, Bulgaria
- Died: 11 December 2011 (aged 63); Sofia, Bulgaria
- Occupation(s): Actor, singer
- Years active: 1973–2011

Velko Kanev, also known as Velko Kynev (31 July 1948 – 11 December 2011) was a Bulgarian comedic actor. He was also one of the founding members of the Bulgarian comedy show (and musical group) Klub NLO.

He was part of Bulgaria's National Theatre Company and starred in several films. He died on 11 December 2011.
