= Eduard Zahariev =

Bulgarian film director

- Eduard Zahariev in 1980.
- Born: 1 July 1938; Moscow, Russia
- Died: 26 June 1996 (aged 57); Sofia, Bulgaria
- Occupations: Film director Screenwriter
- Years active: 1962–1996

Eduard Zahariev (Bulgarian: Едуард Захариев; 1 July 1938 – 26 June 1996) was a Bulgarian film director and screenwriter.

Being among the prominent Bulgarian film directors from the last decades of the 20th century, Zahariev directed 15 films between 1962 and 1996, most notably The Hare Census (1973), Villa Zone (1975), Manly Times (1977), Almost a Love Story (1980), Elegy (1982) and My Darling, My Darling (1986) which was entered into the 36th Berlin International Film Festival.

His movie Villa Zone (1975) won a Special Prize of the Jury at the Karlovy Vary International Film Festival and the film Belated Full Moon (1996) was nominated for Crystal Globe award at the same festival.

== Filmography ==
=== Director ===
Year	Film			Genre	Notes
Year	English title	Bulgarian title	Transliteration	Genre	Notes
1962	Rails in the Sky	Релси в небето	Relsi v nebeto	documentary	short
1965	A Jump	Скок	Skok	documentary	
1965	Salt	Сол	Sol	documentary	short stopped by the communist censorship
1967	If a Train Is Not Coming	Ако не иде влак	Ako ne ide vlak	Drama	short
1968	The Sky Over the Veleka	Небето на Велека	Nebeto na Veleka	Drama	
1970	BDZh	БДЖ	BDZh	documentary	
1972	Steel	Стомана	Stomana	documentary	
1973	The Hare Census	Преброяване на дивите зайци	Prebroyavane na Divite Zaytsi	Satire	
1975	Villa Zone	Вилна зона	Wilna Zona	Comedy-Drama	Won Special Prize of the Jury at the Karlovy Vary Film Fest
1977	Manly Times	Мъжки времена	Mazhki vremena	Drama	
1980	Almost a Love Story	Почти любовна история	Pochti lyubovna istoriya	Drama	
1982	Elegy	Елегия	Elegia	Drama	
1986	My Darling, My Darling	Скъпа моя, скъпи мой	Skapa moya, skapi moy	Drama, Family	Nominated for Golden Bear at the Berlinale
1991	Protected Zone	Резерват	Reservat	Drama	
1996	Belated Full Moon	Закъсняло пълнолуние	Zakasnyalo palnolunie	Drama	Nominated for Crystal Globe at the Karlovy Vary Film Fest
