= Itzhak Fintzi =

Bulgarian film and stage actor

- Ицхак Финци
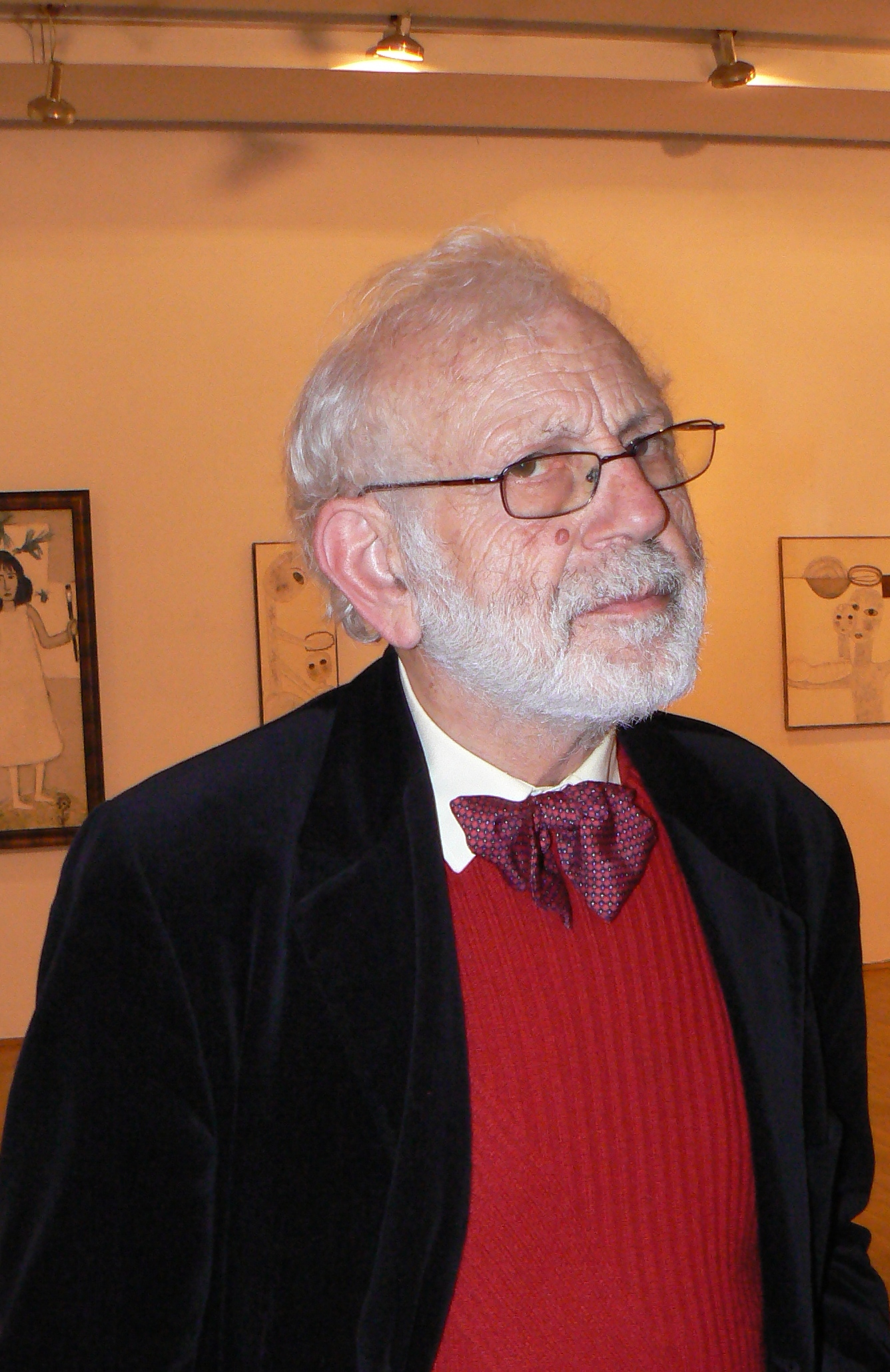
- Born: 25 April 1933 (age 92); Sofia, Bulgaria
- Occupation: Actor
- Years active: 1955–present
- Spouse: Liza Boeva
- Children: 2
- Website: www.filizi33.com

Itzhak Fintzi (Izko Fintzi, Ицко Финци) is a Bulgarian actor known for his work on stage and on screen.

== Biography ==
Fintzi was born in Sofia, Bulgaria in 1933.

He graduated at the National Academy for Theater and Film Arts "Krastyo Sarafov" (Sofia, Bulgaria) in 1955 and in the same year began his career at the Municipal Theatre "Apostol Karamitev" - Dimitrovgrad (1955–1957). After that he performed at the Drama Theater "Adriana Budevska" - Burgas (1957 - 1960). Then he moved to Sofia.

In the period 1960 - 1966, he was part of the theatrical troupe of the Satiritical Theater "Aleko Konstantinov".

In the period 1967 - 1988 he performed at "Theater Sofia". The following two years he worked at the National Theater for youth "Lyudmila Zhivkova" (1988 - 1990). In 1990 he joined the theatrical troupe of the Little City Theatre "Off The Channel".

He performed on the stage of Theatre 199 "Valentin Stoychev". His footprints are placed on the Wall of fame there.

Aside from his stage work, Itzko Fintzi has starred in numerous Bulgarian films like "The Hare Census", "Villa Zone", "Belated Full Moon", "A Cricket in the Ear", "William Shakespeare: The Most Famous Person Who Never Existed".

In 2017, alongside the film director Liza Boeva, he created the educational platform for courses and lectures on Arts for children and adults - "Filizi 33". Among their recent courses are: "Italian and Northern Renaissance", "Hieronymus Bosch", "Pieter Brueghel The Elder", "Franz Kafka", "Oscar Wilde", and others.

Itzko performs in various theatrical lecture-spectacles like "Who killed Romeo and Juliet?" (2018, director: Liza Boeva, City Art Mark Center, Sofia, Bulgaria), "The Black Square" (2021, director: Liza Boeva, Little City Theatre "Off The Channel"), "The Master and Margarita". Bulgakov and the authority" (2022, director: Liza Boeva, Little City Theatre "Off The Channel").

== Awards ==
- "II prize", "for a male role" for the role of the old man from the play "When the Roses Dance" (1962)
- "II Prize" for the film "The Hare Census" (Varna, 1973)
- Critic's Award for the film "The Hare Census" (Varna, 1973)
- Honored Artist (1979)
- "Award of the CS of the SBP" "for acting achievement" for the role of Shiyaka in the film "Elegy" (Varna, 1982)
- The award "for a male role" for the role of Dimitar Lukov in the film "The Great Love of D. Lukov" (1983)
- The prize "for a male role" for the role of Hrily in the play "Puk" at the International Festival of Puppet Theaters (Varna, 1984)
- SBFD Best Actor Award for role in Belated Full Moon (1997)
- Askeer Lifetime Achievement Award (1991)
- Best Actor Award: at the International Television Film Festival - Prague
- "Best Actor" Award: at the "Golden Rose" International Film Festival - Varna
- "Best Actor" Award: at the Festival of Small Theater Forms - Vratsa
- Best Actor Award: Sofia Film Fest
- Order "Stara Planina" - 1st degree (2004)

== Theater Roles ==
- "Talks with Karel Čapek"
- "Sisyphus and Death" (Robert Merle) - Death
- "The Threepenny Opera" (Bertolt Brecht)
- "Molière" (Mikhail Bulgakov) - Molière
- "The Birthday Party" (Harold Pinter) - Stanley
- "Can't Pay? Won't Pay!" (Dario Fo)
- "The Light Is Lost At The Fifth Lamp"
- "Bedbug" (Vladimir Mayakovsky), 1960
- "The End of the Beginning" (Sean O'Casey), director: Metodi Andonov, 1965

== TV theater ==
- The Oppenheimer Affair (1988) (Heiner Kiphart), 2 parts
- The Judge and the Yellow Rose (by Georgi Danailov, directed by Margarita Mladenova) (1984)
- Looking for a new mother (1983) (Olga Krasteva)
- Big and Little Claus (1971) (Hans Christian Andersen) - Musical
- Dialogues (1970) (Krastyu Pishurka)
- The World is Small (1968) (Ivan Radoev)
- Ambrosio Kills Time (1966), Musical
- The Hospital Room (1964)

== Voice Over Actor ==
Itzko Fintzi is a voice over actor for many audio tales of children stories like "Putz, Zhalturko and friends", "Pop!", "Nils Holgersson and the White Goose", "The Ebony Horse", "Robinson Crusoe" and others.

He is a voice over actor for many of Filizi 33's projects (audio lectures, documentary movie-lectures, feature films, short films and others).

== Filmography ==
Year	Original Title	English Title	Co-production	Role	Notes
2018	Уилям Шекспир: най-известният човек, който никога не е съществувал	William Shakespeare: The Most Famous Person Who Never Existed		T.S. Selznik, the voice of Philip	directed by Liza Boeva
2018	Времето е наше	Time is ours			
2017	Моторът	The Motorcycle			
2017	Крал Опа – („König Opa“)	King Grandpa	Germany	Clemens Opa	directed by Martin Grau
2016	Уилям Шекспир. Откъси от пиеси	William Shakespeare. Pieces of plays			directed by Liza Boeva
2014	Аз бях Джек Керуак	I was Jack Kerouac			directed by Liza Boeva
2013	Лятото на Мона Лиза	The Summer of Mona Lisa			directed by Liza Boeva
2013	Космос	Cosmos			directed by Liza Boeva
2012	Преди нощта да изтече	Before The Night Ends		the father	directed by Katerina Borisova
2012	Вера	Vera			directed by Liza Boeva
2011	Миграцията на паламуда	The Migration of the Belted Bonito		Strashilov	directed by Lyudmil Todorov
2010	Детето чудо – („L'enfant prodige“)	The Child Prodigy	Canada	Sergeï Rachmaninov	directed by Luc Dionne
2009	Бащината игра – („Das Vaterspiel“)	Kill Daddy Good Night	Austria/ Germany/ France/ Eire	Lucas	directed by Michael Glawogger
2007	13 кратки опуса за голям екран	13 Short Opuses for the Silver Screen			directed by Liza Boeva and Itzko Fintzi
2007	Летете с Росинант	Fly By Rosinant	Bulgaria/Serbia/Austria		directed by Georgi Stoev
2007	Малки разговори				
2007	Чифликът на чучулигите – („La masseria delle allodole“)	The Lark Farm	Italy/Bulgaria/Spain/France/Germany	grandpa Hovannes	directors: Paolo Taviani and Vittorio Taviani
2006	Заекът на Ватанен – („Le lièvre de Vatanen“)		Belgium/ Bulgaria/ France	Inouc	directed by Marc Rivière
2006	Пазачът на мъртвите	Warden of the Dead		old man Angel	directed by Iliyan Simeonov
2006	Докосване			professor Pavlov	
2006	Март				
2004	Откраднати очи		Bulgaria/Turkey	the grandfather	
2004	Боси	Bare-feet		the blind man	directed by Liza Boeva
2001	Бунтът	Uprising	USA	Rabbi Lebowicz	directed by Jon Avnet
2001	И Господ слезе да ни види Посетени от Господ – алтернативно заглавие	The Lord came down to see us (Visited by God - alternative title)		Francophone writer	
2001	Съдбата като плъх (тв)		Bulgaria/Macedonia		
2001	Градът на страха“	City of Fear	Canada/ UK/ Bulgaria/ USA	Timoshenko („Emil Boev“)	
2001	Сивата зона	The Grey Zone	USA		
2000	Пансион за кучета			Charlie Chaplin	
1999	Вишнева градина	The Cherry Orchard	Greece/Cyprus/France	the foreigner	
1999	Операция Делта Форс 4: Смъртна опасност	Operation Delta Force 4: Deep Fault	USA	General Kisimir Nabiža	
1998	Ден и половина от живота на Маргарита				
1998	Дълбоко в сърцето – („In fondo al cuore“)		Italy		
1996	Всичко от нула			the elder actor	
1996	Закъсняло пълнолуние	Belated Full Moon	Bulgaria/Hungary	the old man	directed by Eduard Zahariev
1996	Завръщане у дома	?		Max	
1994	Тя – (Elle)	Her	France/Bulgaria/Chili/Switzerland/Portugal		
1993	Душевен смут		Hungary		
1990	(„Neuschwanstein sehen und sterben“)		Germany	professor Petkov	
1993	Голгота		Germany/ Bulgaria		
1993	Фатална нежност				
1991	Резерват		Bulgaria/ Hungary	Vasil	
1990 – 1993	Съдебни хроники			the lawyer/ the judge/ the inspector	
1990	Под игото		Bulgaria/ Hungary	hadji Atansiya	
1990	Племенникът чужденец			Kyun	
1990	Разходки с ангела			the painter	
1990	Немирната птица любов			the director	
1990	Лагерът			the voice of elder Todor	
1989	Разводи, разводи	Divorces, divorces		the photographer	
1989	Аз, Графинята			dr. Gerenski, the psychiatrist	
1988	Пибипкащият нос				
1987	Патилата на Спас и Нели	The Adventures of Spas and Nelly		the chimney sweeper	
1987	Само ти, сърце			Archimandrite Hessarius, Sasho	
1985	Константин Философ			Halil (Dimitrii)	
1985	Характеристика			Penchev	
1985	Пътят на музикантите			the old man	
1984	Романтична история			the director	
1983	Господин за един ден			the tax collector	
1983	Константин Философ			Halil (Dimitrii)	
1983	Търси се нова майка				
1982	Голямата любов на Д. Л. (тв)	The big love of D.L.		Dimitar Lukov	
1982	Елегия	Elegy		Ivan Shiyaka	directed by Eduard Zahariev
1982	(„Szívzür“)		Hungary	dr. Gati	
1981	Нашият Шошканини	Our Shoshkanini		Docho Shoshkov	directed by Georgi Stoev
1980	Чонтвари – („Csontváry“)	Csontváry	Hungary	Csontvary	directed by Zoltán Huszárik
1980	Въздушният човек			Kusho	
1979	Бумеранг			the violin player	
1979	Случки на открито (тв)				
1978	По дирята на безследно изчезналите			Todor Strashimirov	
1978	Чуй петела	Hear the Rooster		the old veteran	
1978	Утрото е неповторимо			Kasamov	
1977	Слънчев удар			Dragiev	
1976	Над Сантяго вали – („Il pleut sur Santiago“)		Bulgaria/ France	Minister of the Economics	
1976	Щурец в ухото	A Cricket in the Ear		Gosho	directed by Georgi K. Stoyanov
1976	Земя без въздух				
1975	Белег за човещина			the inspector	
1975	Вилна зона	Vila Zone		Yonko	directed by Eduard Zahariev
1974	Гардеробът	The Wardrobe		доцентът	
1974	На чисто			Gurkov	
1974	Баща ми бояджията (тв)	My Father, the painter		the agent	directed by Stefan Dimitrov
1974	Къщи без огради	Houses without fences		the architect	
1973	Преброяване на дивите зайци	The Hare Census		Asenov	directed by Eduard Zahariev
1973	Последната дума	The Last Word		the priest	
1973	Бягство в Ропотамо	Escape to Ropotamo		dr. S. Penkov	directed by Rangel Valchanov
1973	Сиромашко лято	Poor man's summer		Tsvetarski	directed by Milen Nikolov
1973	Зелена слънчева пътека	The Green Sunny Path		Doctor Oh-it-hurts	
1972	Голямата победа (тв)	Big win (TV)		Izko, the actor	
1972	Трета след слънцето	Third after the Sun		Nedev, the commander	
1971	Шарен свят (тв)	Colorful world (TV)		the lieutenant	
1971	Края на песента	The End of the Song		Deli Mehmed	directed by Milen Nikolov
1970	Весела антология (тв)	Merry Anthology (TV)		the blind musician	
1970	Задушница			the blind musician	
1969	Птици и хрътки	Birds and Hounds		the inventor of the machines for the trials	
1967	Морето	The Sea		the inspector	directed by Petar Donev
1959	Звезди – („Sterne“)	Stars	Germany/ Bulgaria	a Greek Jew	directed by Konrad Wolf

== Books ==
- "Five plays told by an actor" ("Пет пиеси, разказани от актьор"). Sofia, 2024. Publisher: "Filizi 33". ISBN 978-619-92797-0-0
- "The Motorcycle, Romulus the Great, The Naive, Then Again in Sao Paulo, What Am I to Peter Brook?, Bobo and Other Readings". Sofia, 2009. Publisher: Riva. ISBN 978-954-320-271-3.
