= Ivan Andonov =

Bulgarian filmmaker and actor (1934–2011)

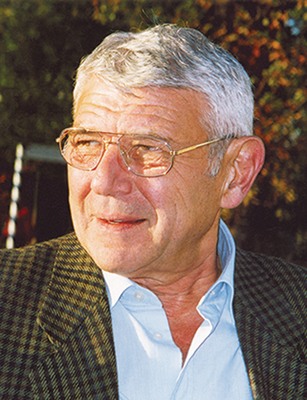
- Andonov in 2010
- Born: Ivan Asenov Andonov; 3 May 1934 (age 92); Plovdiv, Bulgaria
- Died: 29 December 2011 (aged 77); Sofia, Bulgaria
- Occupations: Film director; actor
- Years active: 1963–2001

Ivan Asenov Andonov (Bulgarian: Иван Асенов Андонов; 3 May 1934 – 29 December 2011) was a Bulgarian film director and actor. He directed more than thirty films, and is best known for his cinematography on Ladies' Choice (1980), Dangerous Charm (1984), Yesterday (1988) and Rio Adio (1989).

== Selected filmography ==
=== As filmmaker ===
Year	Title	Director	Writer	Notes
1980	Ladies' Choice	Yes	No	
1984	Dangerous Charm	Yes	No	
1988	Yesterday	Yes	Uncredited	
1989	Rio Adio	Yes	No	

=== As actor ===
Film
Year	Title	Role	Notes
1967	Detour	Boyan	
1970	The Falcons	Fiú	
1972	Eolomea	Daniel Lagny	
