= Vasya =

Vasya may refer to:

- Vasya (crater), a tiny crater on the Moon
- Vasya (film), 2002 American documentary film about artist Vasily Sitnikov
- Vassya Bankova (Vasya Bankova; born 1954), a Bulgarian chemist

== See also ==
- Vasja, a masculine given name
- Vasyanovich, a surname
- Vasin, a surname derived from Vasya
