= Dobrujan Bulgarians =

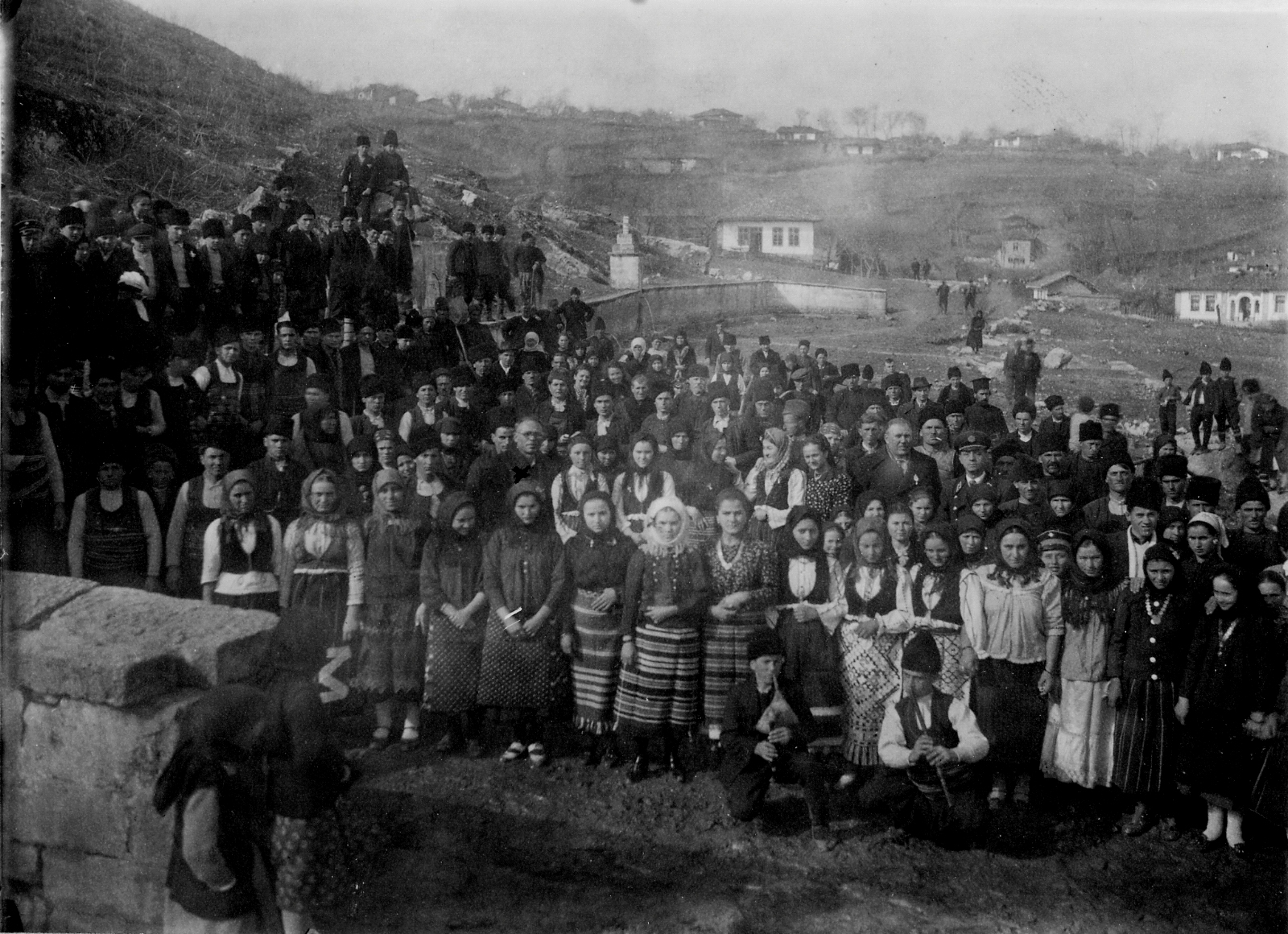
Dobrujans in Kaynardzha, 1941

Dobrujan Bulgarians (Bulgarian: Добруджанци or Добруджански българи) — also spelled Dobrudžans, Dobrudzans, and Dobrudjans — is a regional, ethnographic group of ethnic Bulgarians, inhabiting or originating from Dobruja. Today, the larger part of this population is concentrated in Southern Dobruja, but much is spread across the whole of Bulgaria and the diaspora. Until the early 1940s, the Dobrujan Bulgarians lived also in the whole of Dobruja, part of the Ottoman Empire at the past and part of the Kingdom of Romania then. In September 1940, the governments of Bulgaria and Kingdom of Romania agreed to a population exchange according to the Treaty of Craiova. The Bulgarian population in Northern Dobruja was expelled into Bulgaria-controlled Southern Dobruja, today Dobrich Province and Silistra Province. Nevertheless, some Bulgarian minorities still exist in Northern Dobruja in Ceamurlia de Jos, Tulcea, Ovidiu, Lumina, Cernavodă, Constanța, Cumpăna, Valu lui Traian, Mangalia.

== Notable Dobrujan Bulgarians ==
- Dora Gabe, poet
- Adriana Budevska, actress
- Ivailo Petrov, writer
- Miroslav Kostadinov, singer
- Khristo Ivanov, organic chemist
- Panait Cerna, poet
- Dimitar Spisarevski, fighter pilot
- Preslava, singer

== See also ==
- Bulgarians
- Bulgarians in Romania
- Dobrujan Germans
- Internal Dobrujan Revolutionary Organisation
