= Vesna Terzin =

Vesna Terzin (Serbian Cyrillic: Весна Терзин; born 1959) is a politician in Serbia. She served in the Assembly of Vojvodina from 2016 to 2020 as a member of the Party of United Pensioners of Serbia (PUPS).

== Private life ==
Terzin is a pensioner. She is from Vojvoda Stepa in the municipality of Nova Crnja.

== Politician ==
Terzin was appointed to the municipal council of Nova Crnja (i.e., the executive branch of the municipal government) on 8 July 2013. She served for the next three years, until her election to the provincial assembly.

The PUPS contested the 2016 Vojvodina provincial election on the electoral list on the Serbian Progressive Party. Terzin received the fifty-fifth position on the list and was elected when the list won a majority victory with sixty-three out of 120 mandates. She served on the national equality committee and the committee on youth and sports. She was also vice-president of the PUPS provincial board during this time.

Terzin was not a candidate for re-election in 2020.
