= Rumen Surdzhiyski =

Bulgarian filmmaker (1943–2019)

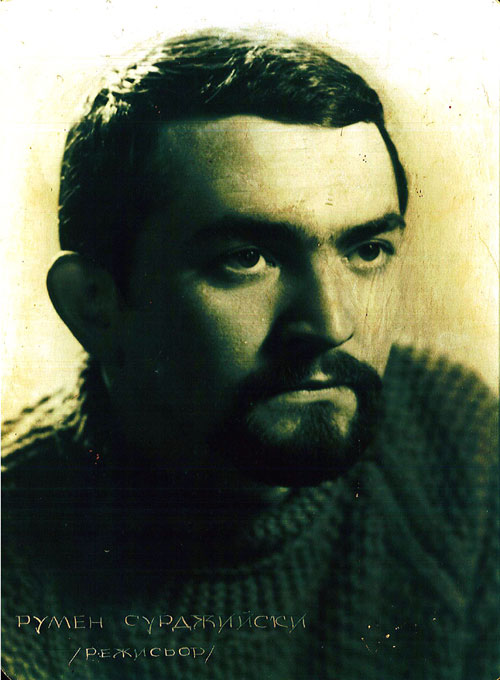
- Born: Rumen Ivanov Surdzhiyski; 24 September 1943; Glozhene, Vratsa Province, Bulgaria
- Died: 11 July 2019 (aged 75); Sofia, Bulgaria
- Education: National Academy for Theater and Film Arts (NATFA) "Krastyo Sarafov"
- Occupation: Filmmaker
- Years active: 1968–2019
- Notable work: Swan (1976); Snapshots as Souvenirs (1979); Place Under the Sun (1986)

Rumen Ivanov Surdzhiyski (Bulgarian: Ру́мен Ивано́в Сурджийски; 24 September 1943 – 11 July 2019) was a Bulgarian filmmaker.

In 1967 he graduated in theatrical directing at the National Academy for Theater and Film Arts (NATFA) "Krastyo Sarafov", located in Sofia, Bulgaria. He studied under the Merited Artist Prof. Stefan Surchadzhiev and later under Prof. Anastas Mihaylov. His first theatrical production on professional stage was "Kaliakra" (season 1967-1968), put at the Dobrich Drama Theatre "Yordan Yovkov". His more notable films are Swan (1976), Snapshots as Souvenirs (1979) and Place Under the Sun (1986).

His films are defined by humanism. They explore the characteristics of human nature with its aspirations and conflicts. His characters are genuine, living, going through real life experiences. The author and film critic Alexander Alexandrov wrote: "Rumen Surdzhiyski proves that he possesses acute power of observation towards the spiritual phenomena in our society and the problems of the time we live in." ("Narodna Kultura", newspaper, 1979)

== Childhood and adolescence ==
Rumen Surdzhiyski was born in the village of Glozhene, Vratsa Province, to a family of a common worker. In 1943, due to the state of war and the continuing bombings of Sofia in World War II, his parents choose for his birth the safety of the countryside. The picturesque valley of the Ogosta river, with women washing wool and kids cooling in the waters of the river, remain the best memories of his life. As he himself says, "He, who did not live in the countryside, at least as little, he does not know anything!"

He did well in school and participated in several sports: football, track and field, gymnastics, and swimming. He often visited the Cultural House of the Transport Workers, where numerous musical and drama groups performed. The children-teenage drama club was led by the unforgettable Youth Theater actress, Lioli Popova. All activities, rehearsals, and discussions sparked the imagination of the adolescents, made them dream, introduced them to a beautiful world - the world of art.

At the same time, he was a contestant at Radio Sofia, where they brought several kids to participate in a popular science radio show, together with the actor from the National Theatre, Emil Stefanov. He won the contest and later began to host his own radio show called "Wonderful pages". It was broadcast every Saturday morning.

Still as a student, he participated in numerous cinema-clubs, led by Todor Andreykov, prof. Nedelcho Milev and others, and he is first introduced to European and world cinema.

In 11th grade he is chosen as a flag-bearer of the high-school. He graduates from the 14th Secondary Polytechnic School "Prof. Asen Zlatarov", located in "Banishora" quarter, Sofia.

He served in the Bulgarian army two years, in a motorized rifle regiment, in the Gara Pirin Division (today the city of Kresna, Blagoevgrad Province). He was admitted to the junior sergeant school.

== Student at NATFA ==
Surdzhiyski applied for higher education in two specialties - English Philology and Directing. He was admitted to both specialties. Of the eight admitted directors he was fourth place. He chose to study directing.

He entered the National Academy for Theater and Film Arts (NATFA) "Krastyo Sarafov" in 1963. His teachers were the exceptionally fascinating Prof. Stefan Surchadzhiev and Metodi Andonov, about whom he said "an ingenious lecturer, the memory of whom will warm my soul as long as I live..." During the second year of his studies, Prof. Surchadzhiev died and the class continued to study with Prof. Anastas Mihaylov.

During the course of his education he studied the films of Michelangelo Antonioni, Federico Fellini, Jean-Luc Godard and other directors from the French New Wave. Strong impression were made on him the films by the Polish and Czech cinema, the work of Andrzej Wajda, Miloš Forman, world directors such as Ingmar Bergman, Akira Kurosawa and others.

His fellow students were: Stefan Danailov, Ilia Dobrev, Stefan Mavrodiyev, Milen Penev, Kirill Kavadarkov, Dobromir Manev, Prodan Nonchev, Ivo Rusev, Meglena Karalambova, Elena Rainova, Lidia Eminova, Lyudmila Zaharieva, Vesela Blagoeva and others. As he himself exclaimed: "What class, what actors!"

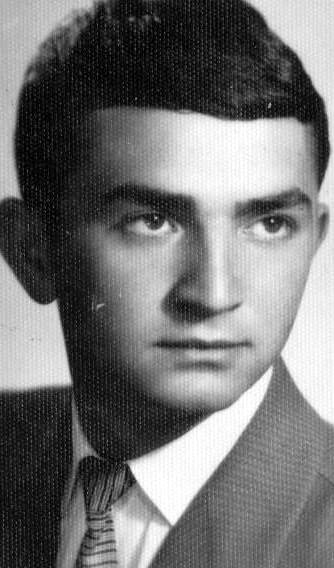
Rumen Surdzhiyski as a first year student at the National Academy for Theater and Film Arts, 1963

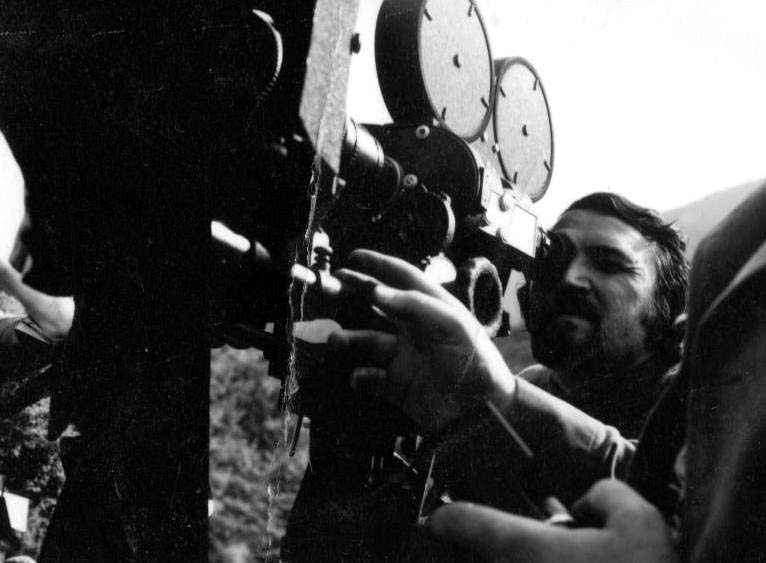
On the film set, 1979

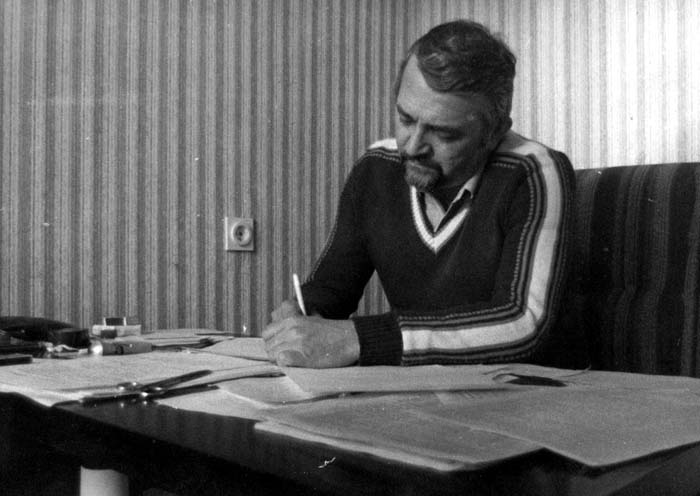
Working on script, 1986

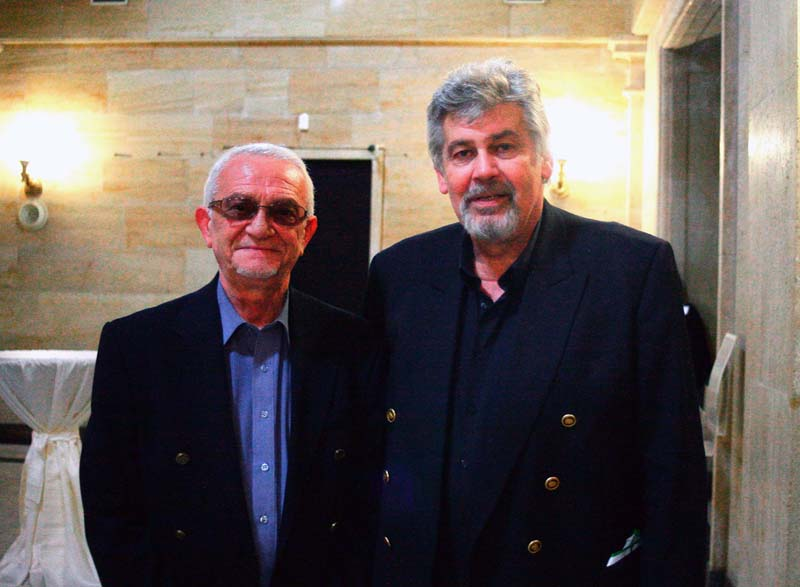
Rumen Surdzhiyski and Stefan Danailov (NATFA graduates of the same year)

== Career and Work ==
Rumen Surdzhiyski's first steps in cinema were as an actor. Still a student at NATFA, he has two small roles in the films "Taste of Almonds" (1967) and "The Penlevé case" (1967).

In the same year (1967) he graduated from NATFA and he joins the Dobrich Drama Theatre "Yordan Yovkov" as writer-director. His first play on its stage is "Kaliakra" (season 1967-1968), which is a revival production with author, and the dramatist of the theatre, Krastyo Drenski. The play recreates the legend of Kaliakra, the main role of which performed by the unforgettable actress Katya Pascaleva. Next are the plays "Golemanov" (1968), by Ste Le Kostov, with which the Dobrich Drama theatre toured to Nitra, Slovakia, "The Nights of Ivan Gilin", by Nikolay Parushev (season 1968-1969), "Svekarva", by Anton Strashimirov (season 1968-1969) and "Chichovtsi", a dramatization by Ivan Vazov (season 1969-1970).

On the stage of the Dobrich Drama Theatre Rumen Surdzhiyski worked with a team including the actors Katya Paskaleva, Kirill Kavadarkov, Lidia Eminova, Plamen Donchev, Radoslav Stoilov, Stoyan Gerganov, along with some of the incumbent actors - Kalcho Georgiev, Galina Nenova, Lyuben Popov, Ventzislav Valchev, Atanas Bozhinov, etc. with the directors Nikolay Polyakov, Kuzman Popov, with production designer Lydia Batzinova. In 1970 fire destroyed the theatre building so the theatrical company moved in the local Cultural House.

In 1970, Rumen Surdzhiyski was invited by Pencho Dimitrov, assistant producer with Studios for Feature Films "Boyana", to work as assistant director of dialog, in the Bulgarian-Italian Production "Michael Strogoff" (1970), by the director Eriprando Visconti. The work of these assistants is to help the actors deal with the English text, because the film was shot in English. He did not hesitate and left the theater and to begin his career in cinema.

As a first assistant director, he also worked in the production "The Indispensable Sinner" (1971) by the director Borislav Sharaliev.

As an assistant director, he shot the films "Third After the Sun" (1972) (a.k.a. "The Birth of Man" or "Third Planet in the Solar System"), by the director Gueorgui Stoyanov, "Ivan Kondarev" (1974), by the director Nikola Korabov, "Visa for the Ocean" (1975) , by the director Lada Boyadjieva and "People from Afar" (1977), by the director Nikola Rudarov.

His first author's project was the documentary film "As in a movie review" (1975), which was a collective portrait of the women working in the Computer Data Storage Device Plant in Plovdiv. For it he received the debut award at the Documentary Film Festival in Plovdiv.

His debut as a feature film director producer was with the movie "Swan" (1976), screenplay writer Vladimir Ganev, based on the story "Stubborn People" from the collection "Devil's Tales" (1972), by the writer Ivailo Petrov. This is followed by the movies Snapshots as Souvenirs (1976) by screenplay writer Atanas Tzenev, and "Place Under the Sun" (1986) by screenplay writer Tziliya Lacheva.

He was a member of the Union of Bulgarian Film Makers since 1981. Surdzhiyski died on 11 July 2019 in Sofia at the age of 75.

== Sources ==
- Films and Filming, Vol. 18, Author Robin Bean [Editor], Hanson Books, 1971, p. 22
- Plamŭk Magazine, Vol. 21, Issues: 1–4, Publisher: Sŭi︠u︡z na bŭlgarskite pisateli, 1977, p. 220
- "Narodna Kultura" Newspaper, Issue 33, Article: "Defenders of the truth", Author: Alexander Alexandrov, 17 August 1979, p. 6
- Dokladi: Teatŭr i kino. Mŭzika, Vol. 17 от Dokladi, Author: Panteleĭ Zarev, Publisher: Bŭlgarska Akademii︠a︡ na Naukite, 1987, p. 161
- "60 godini tribuna i sŭvest": istorii︠a︡ na DT "Ĭordan Ĭovkov" Tolbukhin, Author: Elena Dimova Ivanova, Publisher: Khristo G. Danov, 1988, Original issue by University of California, pages 113, 115, 123, 125, 137, 144
- BULGARIAN FEATURE FILMS, An annotated Illustrated Filmography, Volume two (1948-1970), author: Galina Gencheva, issue of BULGARSKA NACIONALNA FILMOTEKA, Dr. Peter Beron State Publishing House, Sofia, 1988, index116/pp. 296–297, index 123/pp. 312–313
- "Encyclopedia of Bulgarian Cinema AZ - Personalities, Films", Author: Alexander Yanakiev, Titra Publishing House, 2000, ISBN 9549048624, pp. 425, 447-448, 523-524, 539, 542-543
- "Bulgarian Feature Films: Annotated Illustrated Filmography", Vol. 3 (1971-1980), Author: Galina Gencheva, Bulgarian National Film Library, Dr Ivan Bogorov Publishing House, 2008, ISBN 9543160694, 9789543160693, index 167/pp. 47–48, index 181/pp. 79–81, index 205/pp. 130–131, index 229/pp. 180–181, index 259/pp. 240–241, index 264/pp. 250–251, index 308/pp. 336–337
- feature films: Annotated Illustrated Filmography. 1971-1980, Volume 3, Authors Glaina Gencheva, Bulgarian National Film Library, Publisher: "Dr. Ivan Bogorov", 2008, ISBN 9789543160693, pages 167, 181, 205, 229 +
- 100 Years Film Process: Persons, Films, Halls, Author: Alexander Milkov Yanakiev, Publisher: "Titra", 2003, pages 305+
- literaturna diskusii︠a︡, Publisher: Sŭiu︠z︡ na bŭlgarskite pisateli, 1986, Original issue by University of Michigan, page 181
- na periodichnii͡a︡ pechat, Vol. 18, Contributors: Bŭlgarski bibliografski institut, Narodna biblioteka "Kiril i Metodiĭ", Bŭlgarski bibliografski institut Elin Pelin, Publisher: Institut, 1969, Original issue by The University of Virginia, pages 81, 89, 120
- issues 4–5, Publisher Sŭi͡uz na bŭlgarskite pisateli, 1980, page 182
