= Dušan Korać =

Serbian politician (born 1969)

Dušan Korać (Serbian Cyrillic: Душан Кораћ; born 1969) is a politician in Serbia. He served in the Assembly of Vojvodina from 2016 to 2020 and is currently a member of the municipal council of Apatin. Korać is a member of the Serbian Progressive Party.

== Private career ==
Korać is a zoo technologist. He lives in Apatin.

== Politician ==
=== Municipal politics ===
Korać received the second position on the Progressive Party's electoral list for the Apatin municipal assembly in the 2012 Serbian local elections and was elected when the list won two mandates. He received the same position in the 2016 local elections and was re-elected when the list won twelve mandates. He resigned his local mandate on 20 June 2016.

On 21 August 2020, he was appointed as a member of the Apatin municipal council (i.e., the executive branch of the local government).

=== Assembly of Vojvodina ===
Korać was given the fiftieth position on the Progressive Party's list for the 2016 Vojvodina provincial election and was elected when the list won a majority victory with sixty-three out of 120 mandates. For the next four years, he served as a supporter of the government. He attracted some attention in late 2016, when he donated four hundred thousand dinars to local civic organizations in Apatin after receiving an equivalent amount in compensation for damages on his farmstead. He did not seek re-election in 2020.
