= Slađana Jovanović =

Serbian politician (born 1972)

Slađana Jovanović (Serbian Cyrillic: Слађана Јовановић; born 1972) is a politician in Serbia. She served in the Assembly of Vojvodina from 2016 to 2020 as a member of the Serbian Progressive Party.

== Private career ==
Jovanović is an educator living in Bečej in the province of Vojvodina.

== Politician ==
=== Municipal politics ===
Jovanović has served two terms in the Bečej municipality assembly. She was given the fifth position on the Progressive Party's electoral list in the 2012 Serbian local elections and was elected when the list won eight mandates. She subsequently received the ninth position on the party's list in the 2016 local elections and was elected when the list won a majority victory with twenty-two out of thirty-six mandates. She did not seek re-election for a third term in 2020.

She has led the Women's Union of the Progressive Party in Bečej.

=== Assembly of Vojvodina ===
Jovanović was awarded the thirty-first position on the Progressive Party's coalition electoral list in the 2016 Vojvodina provincial election and was elected when the list won a majority victory with sixty-three out of 120 mandates. She was a member of the Women's Parliamentary Network in the assembly and was not a candidate for re-election in 2020.

=== Candidacy for the National Assembly ===
Jovanović appeared in the 211th position out of 250 on the Progressive Party's Aleksandar Vučić — For Our Children list in the 2020 Serbian parliamentary election. This was too low a position for election to be a realistic prospect, and indeed she was not elected even as the list won a landslide majority with 188 out of 250 mandates.
