= Dobrujans =

Dobrujans refer to the population of various ethnicities inhabiting or having inhabited the region of Dobruja in Romania and Bulgaria, for example:

- Dobrujan Bulgarians
- Dobrujan Germans
- Dobrujan Tatars
- Dobrujan Turks
