= Swan (1976 film) =

Swan (Lebed)
- Directed by: Rumen Surdzhiyski
- Written by: Vladimir Ganev; Ivailo Petrov
- Produced by: Experimental Cinema Studios
- Starring: Georgi Kaloyanchev; Yordan Spirov; Mario Marinov; Yavor Milushev; Vesko Zehirev; Georgi Popov; Antoaneta Krastnikova
- Cinematography: Lachezar Videnov
- Music by: Bozhidar Petkov
- Release date: September 14, 1976
- Running time: 46 minutes
- Country: Bulgaria
- Language: Bulgarian

Swan (Bulgarian: "Ле́бед", translit.: "Lébed") is a 1976 Bulgarian drama film, directed by Rumen Surdzhiyski. Screenplay writer is Vladimir Ganev. Based on the story "Stubborn people" from the collection "Devil's tails" (1972), by the writer Ivailo Petrov. Cinematographer is Lachezar Videnov. Production designer is Anastas Yanakiev. The music of the film is composed by Bozhidar Petkov. Parts of the film were shot in Bankya, Sozopol, Sunny Beach and the cove of Alepù, at cape "Malkata Agalina".

== Synopsis ==
The Swan is considered one of the most beautiful of God's creatures. In a number of mythologies, it represents a sacred bird - a symbol of purity, harmony and nobility. Unfortunately, not all people are able to understand and judge it by its merits. When a hunting party, sees on their way a swan, one of the hunters decides to shoot it and kills the bird. The blindness for nature's beauty, leads to its lowering to the lowest of human needs. And for every barbaric act there is also a retribution.

== Cast ==
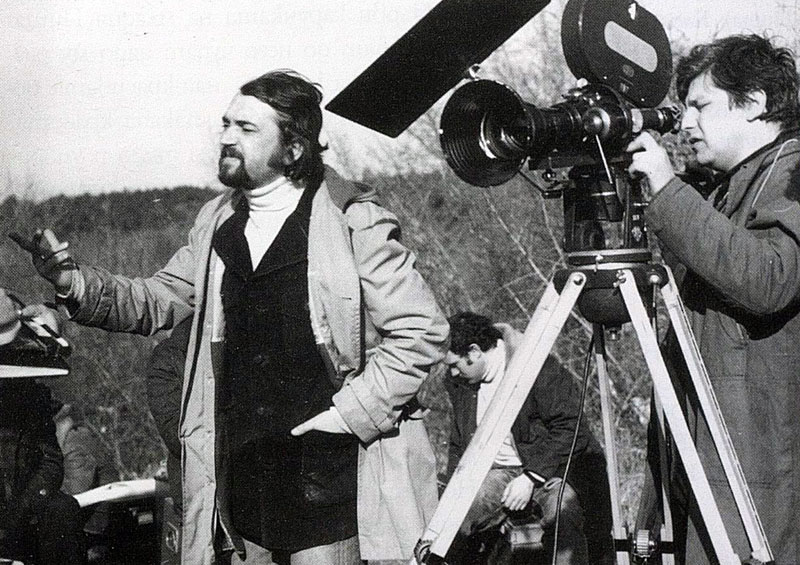
Director Rumen Surdzhiyski and cinematographer Lachezar Videnov on the set of "Swan", 1976 (archive: R. Surdzhiyski)

- Georgi Kaloyanchev as Stoyanov
- Yordan Spirov as Filipov
- Mario Marinov as Dikov
- Yavor Milushev as Milan
- Vesko Zehirev as Gatyo
- Georgi Popov
- Antoaneta Krastnikova

== Sources ==
- "Encyclopedia Bulgarian Cinema AZ - Personalities, Films", Author: Alexander Yanakiev, Titra Publishing House, 2000, ISBN 9549048624, p. 425
- "Bulgarian Feature Films: Annotated Illustrated Filmography", Vol. 3 (1971-1980), Author: Galina Gencheva, Bulgarian National Film Library, Dr Ivan Bogorov Publishing House, 2008, ISBN 9543160694, 9789543160693, index 259, p.240
