= Bulgarians in Romania =

Recognized minority in Romania

Total population
- 5,975 (2021)

Regions with significant populations
- Banat (Dudeștii Vechi), northern Dobruja and Wallachia

Languages
- Bulgarian (Banat Bulgarian), Romanian

Religion
- Predominately Roman Catholicism, with a minority of Bulgarian Orthodox followers

Related ethnic groups
- Banat Bulgarians, Dobrujan Bulgarians, Krashovani

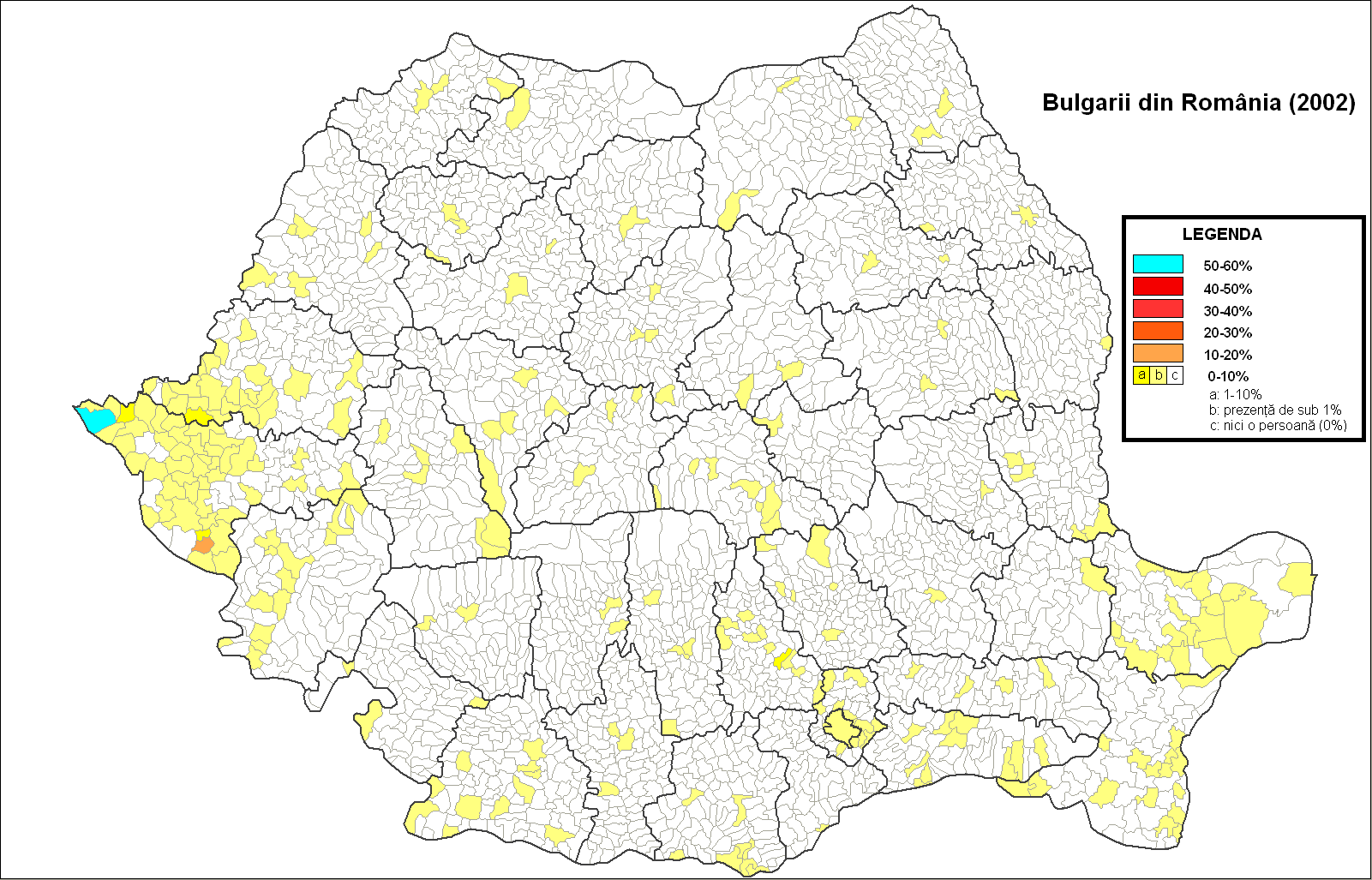
Bulgarians in Romania (2002 census)

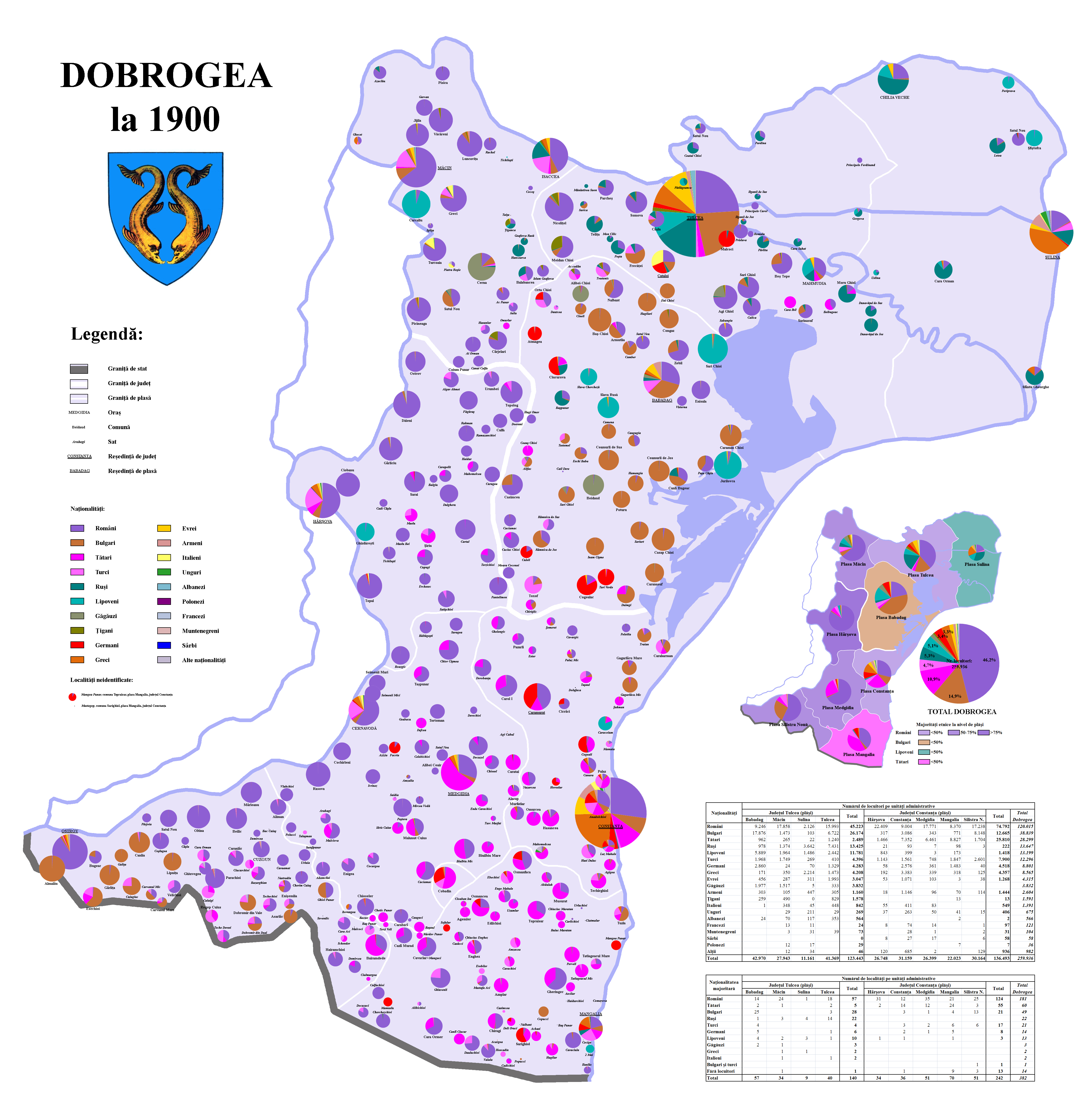
Ethnic map of Dobruja (1900 census)

Bulgarians (Romanian: bulgari) are a recognized minority in Romania (Bulgarian: Румъния, Rumaniya), numbering 7,336 according to the 2011 Romanian census, down from 8,025 in 2002. Despite their low census number today, Bulgarians from different confessional and regional backgrounds have had ethnic communities in various regions of Romania, and during the Middle Ages Bulgarian culture has exerted considerable influence on its northern neighbour. According to one Bulgarian estimate, Romanian citizens of Bulgarian origin number around 250,000. According to the Romanian census of 2021, among the 5,975 ethnic Bulgarians, 3,583 were Roman Catholics, 1,977 were Romanian Orthodox and 21 were Serbian Orthodox.

Historically, Bulgarian communities in modern Romania have existed in Wallachia (Bulgarian: Влашко, transliterated: Vlashko), Northern Dobruja (Bulgarian: Северна Добруджа, translit. Severna Dobrudzha) and Transylvania (Bulgarian: Седмиградско, translit. Sedmigradsko). Currently, however, the Bulgarian community in present-day Romania that has retained most efficiently its numbers, social integrity and strong ethnic identity is that of the Banat Bulgarians, a Roman Catholic minority in the Banat who account for the bulk of the Bulgarian-identifying population of Romania. In Wallachia, there are only few Bulgarians who have preserved their national identity, though the numbers of those who speak Bulgarian and affirm to have Bulgarian ancestors is still high.

Much of the Torlak-speaking Roman Catholic Krashovani who today form a part of the Croatian minority in Romania had declared themselves Bulgarian during the rule of Austria-Hungary.

The population of undisputed Bulgarian origin aside, Bulgarian researchers also claim that the Hungarian minority of the Székely in central Romania is of Magyarized Bulgar (Proto-Bulgarian) origin, and the Șchei of Transylvania were Romanianized Bulgarians (a view also supported by Lyubomir Miletich and accepted by Romanian writers).

== Names ==
While the modern Romanian word for Bulgarians is "bulgari", throughout the history they have been known by other names.

The old Bulgarian population—which existed in Romania by the time of the founding of the principality of Wallachia and the inclusion of Transylvania in the Hungarian Kingdom—was referred as Șchei. This word, currently obsolete, derives from the Latin word sclavis, referring to all South Slavs. Currently, the word appears in many place names in Wallachia and Transylvania, among which, Șcheii Brașovului, a neighborhood of Brașov.

The Bulgarians who migrated during the 19th century were known as sârbi (Serbians). This word may have been used by Romanians to refer to all South Slavs, but it has also been proposed that they used this ethnic identification to prevent the Ottomans from demanding the Wallachian authorities to return the refugees to their place of origin. Even today, the Bulgarians from Wallachia are called "sârbi" (Serbians) though they speak Bulgarian and define themselves as "bulgari" (Bulgarians).

== History ==
=== Antiquity and medieval Bulgarian Empire ===
In Antiquity, both Bulgaria and Romania were inhabited by Thracian tribes, contributing to the ethnogenesis of the Romanian people and possibly the Bulgarian people (along with Slavs and Bulgars), although this is a matter of dispute. During the Migration Period, both the Slavs and the Bulgars crossed what is today Romania to settle in the plains south of the Danube, establishing the First Bulgarian Empire in the 7th century. In the Middle Ages, the lands between the Danube and the Carpathians were scarcely settled, but they were often at least nominally under Bulgarian control in the 9th and 10th century, as well as during some periods of the Second Bulgarian Empire.

The Golden Age of Bulgarian culture under Simeon I exerted considerable influence on the empire's transdanubian possessions. Old Bulgarian was established as the language of liturgy and written communication along with the Cyrillic script created in Bulgaria, which was used for the Romanian language until the 1860s; the first written text in the Romanian language, Neacşu's letter of 1512, illustrates this trend: it was written in Cyrillic, intermixed with Bulgarian sentences and phrases. To this day, a notable part of Romanian's core vocabulary is of Latinized South Slavic origin, although much of it was replaced by Romance and Classical Latin loanwords in the 19th century.

=== Under the Ottomans ===
As the Second Bulgarian Empire fell under full-scale Ottoman rule in the 14th-15th century whereas the lands north of the Danube were still contested between the Europeans and the Ottomans and then came under Ottoman suzerainty, but retained their internal autonomy, many Bulgarian fled the Ottoman occupation in various periods and settled in what is today Romania. These included both Bulgarian Orthodox and some Roman Catholics (either former Paulicians from the central Bulgarian north or from Chiprovtsi in the northwest). The migratory waves were particularly strong after the Austro-Turkish and Russo-Turkish Wars of the 17th-19th century. The Orthodox Bulgarians settled all around the Principality of Wallachia; however, many of them gradually lost their Bulgarian identity and became Romanianized. Catholics primarily migrated to the Austrian-ruled Banat and Transylvania, establishing still-extant communities in modern Timiș County and Arad County; some former Paulicians also settled around Bucharest, in Cioplea and Popeşti-Leordeni. The Transylvanian city of Braşov (Kronstadt) grew into an international merchant centre attracting Bulgarian merchants ever since the 14th century (it was given trade rights in Bulgaria by Bulgarian tsar Ivan Sratsimir's Braşov Charter of 1369–1380) and rivalled Constantinople and Thessaloniki in importance, particularly for the people from northern Bulgaria, with many Bulgarian merchants opening offices and shops in the city. As early as 1392, Bulgarian settlers arrived in the city, contributing to the construction of the city church, today known as the Black Church, and populating the once-Bulgarian city neighbourhood of Șcheii Brașovului. After the Greek Civil War, thousands of Greeks and ethnic Bulgarians fled Greece. Many were evacuated to Romania. A large evacuation camp was established in the Romanian town of Tulgheș.

In the mid-19th century the cities of southern Romania such as Bucharest, Craiova, Galaţi and Brăila attracted many Bulgarian revolutionary and political émigrés, such as Sophronius of Vratsa, Petar Beron, Hristo Botev, Lyuben Karavelov, Georgi Rakovski, Panayot Hitov, Evlogi Georgiev and Hristo Georgievi. In his 1883 novelette Nemili-Nedragi ("Unloved and Unwanted"), Bulgarian national writer Ivan Vazov (1850–1921) describes the life of poor and nostalgic Bulgarian revolutionaries in Wallachia known as hashove (хъшове). Romania also turned into a centre for the organized Bulgarian revolutionary movement seeking to overthrow Ottoman rule: the Bulgarian Revolutionary Central Committee was founded in Bucharest in 1869. In the same year, the Bulgarian Literary Society (modern Bulgarian Academy of Sciences) was established in Brăila. Some of the Bessarabian Bulgarians were also ruled by Moldavia/Romania between 1856 and 1878 (during this time, in Bolgrad the first Bulgarian gymnasium has been opened: the Bolhrad High School), and all of them were under Romanian rule between 1918 and 1940. Today, they live in Ukraine and Moldova.

According to one estimate, the Bulgarian-originating population of the Romanian Old Kingdom and Transylvania (not including Bessarabia) by the time of the Liberation of Bulgaria in 1878 may have numbered up to one million. According to official data from 1838, 11,652 Bulgarian families lived in Wallachia, meaning up to 100,000 people.

=== After the Liberation of Bulgaria ===
Following the Liberation, members of all Bulgarian communities moved to the newly established Principality of Bulgaria, but a significant Bulgarian population remained in Romania. Although set to be ceded to Bulgarian as per the Treaty of San Stefano, the region of Northern Dobruja was awarded to Romania by the Congress of Berlin of 1878. The region had a compact Bulgarian population in the Babadag region, with Northern Dobruja Bulgarians numbering 35–45,000 in the late 19th century. Romania also ruled the Bulgarian-majority Southern Dobruja between 1913 and 1940, when it was ceded back to Bulgaria, with a population exchange between the Bulgarians of Northern Dobruja and the Romanian, Aromanian and Megleno-Romanian colonists in Southern Dobruja. Today, as an officially recognized ethnic minority, Bulgarians have one seat reserved in the Romanian Chamber of Deputies. There exist several organizations of the Bulgarians in Romania.

== Towns and communes with the largest Bulgarian population percentage ==
- Timiș County
  - Dudeștii Vechi (Bulgarian: Стар Бешенов; Banat Bulgarian: Stár Bišnov) — 61.1%
  - Denta — 16.06%
  - Sânnicolau Mare (Bulgarian: Сънниколау Маре; Banat Bulgarian: Smikluš) — 2.98%
  - Deta (Bulgarian: Дета) — 1.93%
- Arad County
  - Vinga (Bulgarian: Винга) — 5.41%

== Notable figures ==
This chronological list includes people of Bulgarian origin born in what is today Romania, as well as Bulgarian people born elsewhere but mainly active in Romania or predecessor states.

- Maria of Mangup (?–1477) — princess consort of Moldavia (of partial Asenid ancestry)
- Vasile Lupu (1595–1661) — ruler of Moldavia (born in Arbanasi, of likely Albanian ancestry)
- Manuc Bei (1769–1817) — merchant, diplomat and innkeeper (of Bulgarian Armenian origin)
- Stefan Bogoridi (1775/1780–1859) — ruler of Moldavia
- Anton Pann (1790s–1854) — composer, musicologist and poet (born in Sliven, of disputed ancestry)
- Stefan Dunjov (1815–1889) — soldier and revolutionary (Banat Bulgarian, active in what was then the Austrian Empire)
- Evlogi Georgiev (1819–1897) — banker and philanthropist
- Nicolae Vogoride (1820–1863) — ruler of Moldavia
- Eusebius Fermendžin (1845–1897) — historian, theologian and high-ranking Franciscan cleric (Banat Bulgarian, active in what was then the Hungarian realm)
- George Panu (1848–1910) — writer and politician
- Dimitar Agura (1849–1911) — historian and politician (of Bessarabian Bulgarian origin)
- Carol Telbisz (1853–1914) — long-time mayor of Timișoara (1885–1914) (Banat Bulgarian, active in what was then the Hungarian realm)
- Paraskev Stoyanov (1871–1941) — surgeon, anarchist, historian and professor
- Christian Rakovsky (1873–1941) — communist revolutionary and diplomat
- Dumitru Karnabatt (1877–1949) — poet and translator
- Elena Bacaloglu (1878–c.1947) — journalist, novelist and fascist politician
- Panait Cerna (1881–1913) — poet and translator
- Dmitrii Milev (1887–1937) — short story writer, translator, and communist politician (of Bessarabian Bulgarian origin)
- Ilie Cătărău (1888–c.1955) — spy, fugitive and adventurer (of likely, but disputed, Bessarabian Bulgarian origin)
- Iorgu Iordan (1888–1986) — linguist, philologist and politician
- Anton Novakov (c.1890–?) — industrialist and politician (of Bessarabian Bulgarian and Gagauz ancestry)
- Boris Stefanov (1893–?) — communist politician and general secretary of the Romanian Communist Party
- Mihai Ralea (1896–1964) — social scientist, critic and politician (of Bulgarian and Jewish ancestry)
- Barbu Solacolu (1897–1976) — poet, civil servant and social scientist
- Stephan Roll (1904–1974) — poet, journalist and communist politician
- Culai Neniu (1905–1939) — folklorist, dramatist and schoolteacher (of Bessarabian Bulgarian origin)
- Petre Borilă (1906–1973) — communist politician and vice-premier of Romania
- Dumitru Coliu (1907–1979) — communist politician
- Petre Gheorghe (1907–1943) — communist politician and anti-fascist insurgent
- Cella Serghi (1907–1992) — novelist and memoirist
- Vladimir Cavarnali (1910–1966) — poet, editor, and political figure (of Bessarabian Bulgarian and Gagauz ancestry)
- Ștefan Sameș (1951–2011) — international footballer of Romania

== Gallery ==
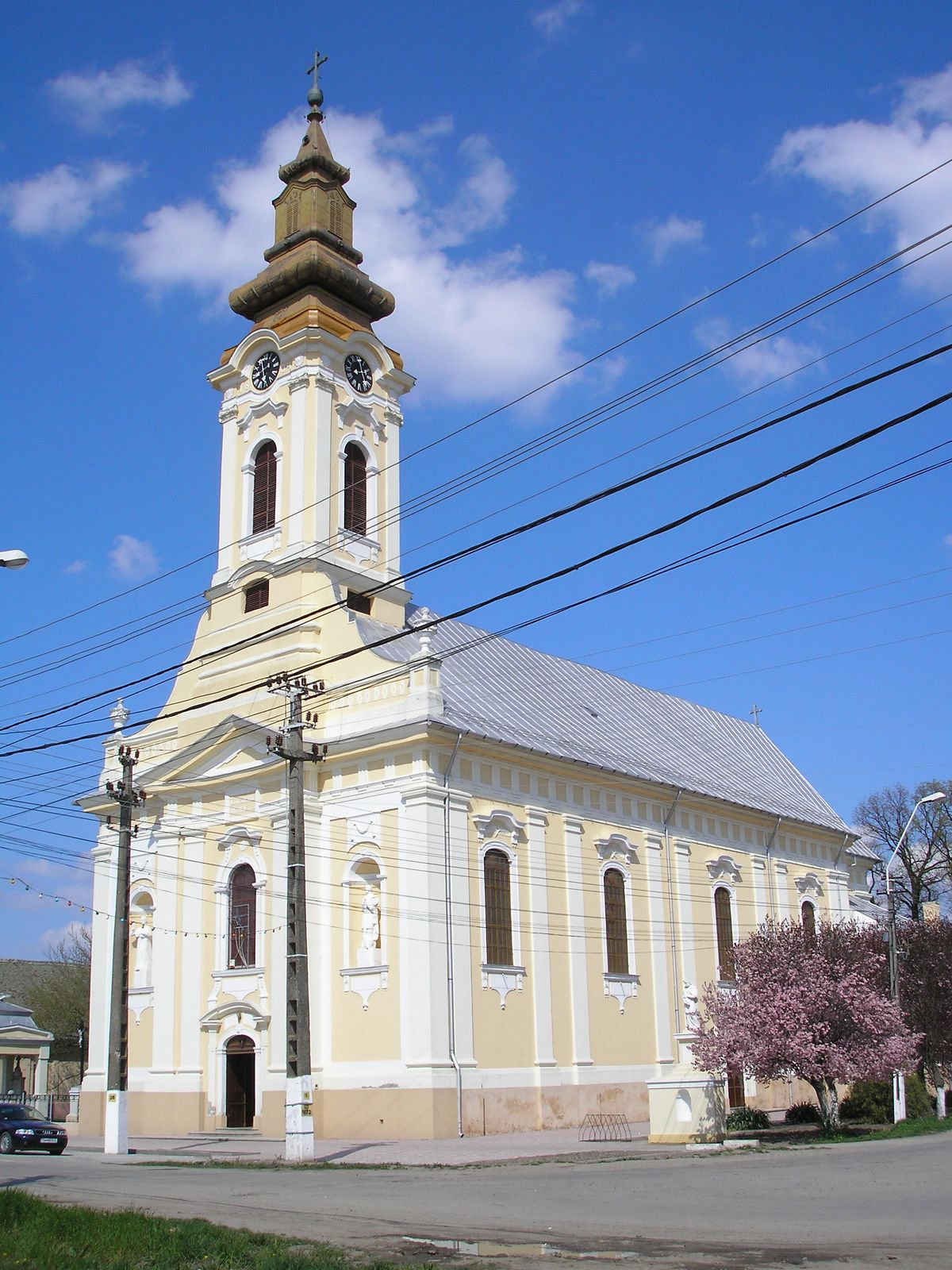
Roman Catholic church in Dudeştii Vechi (Stár Bišnov)

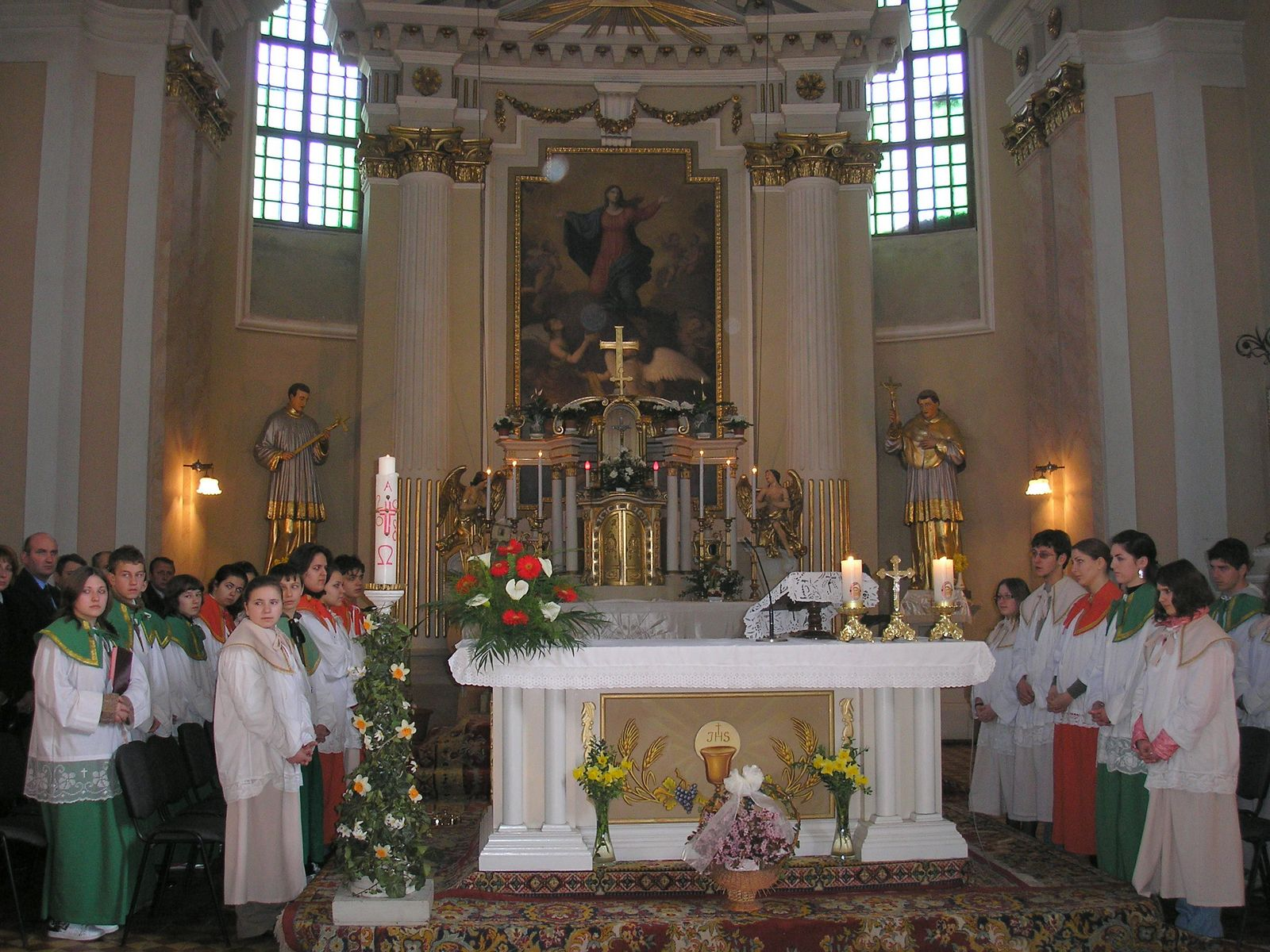
Liturgy in the Bulgarian church in Dudeştii Vechi

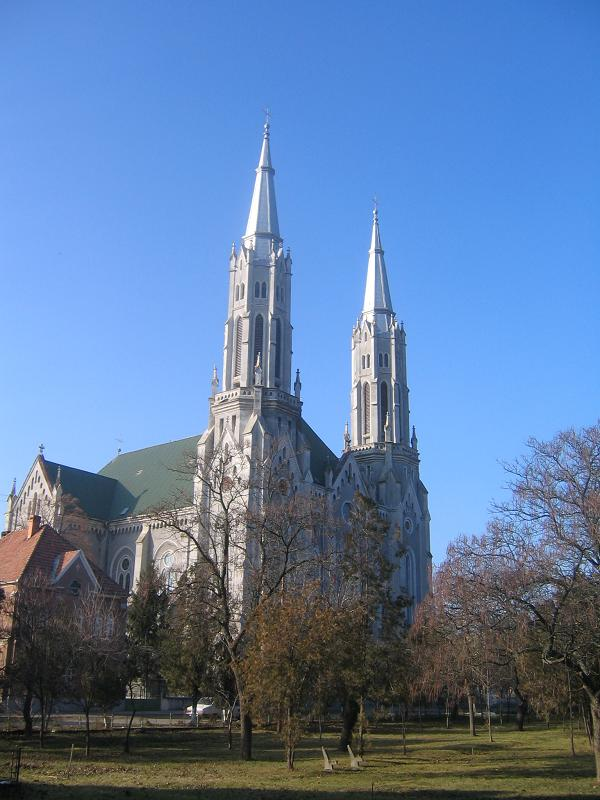
Roman Catholic church in Bulgarian-inhabited Vinga, Banat

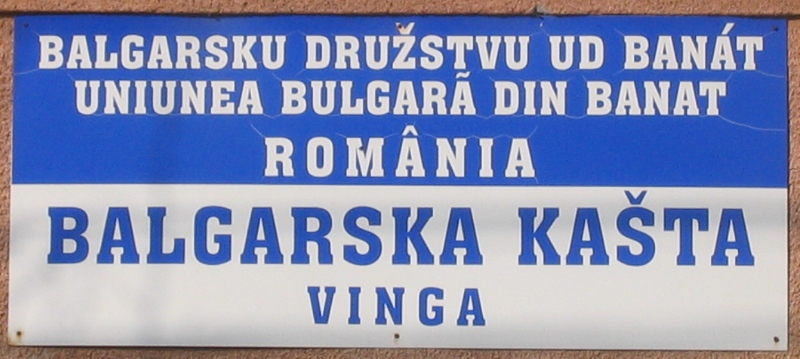
Plaque in Banat Bulgarian on the Bulgarian Cultural House in Vinga

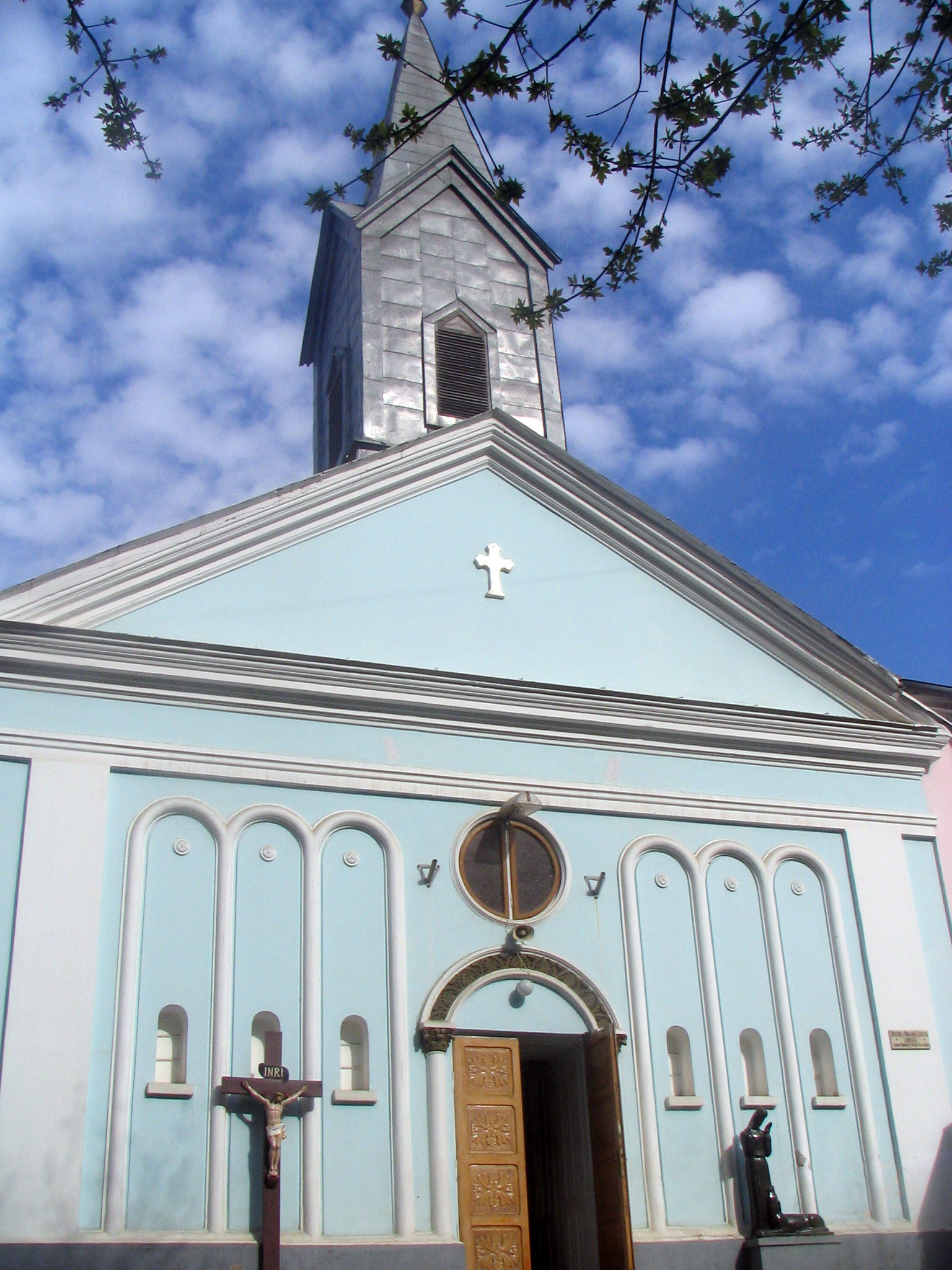
Bulgarian Roman Catholic church in Cioplea, Bucharest (1811–1813)

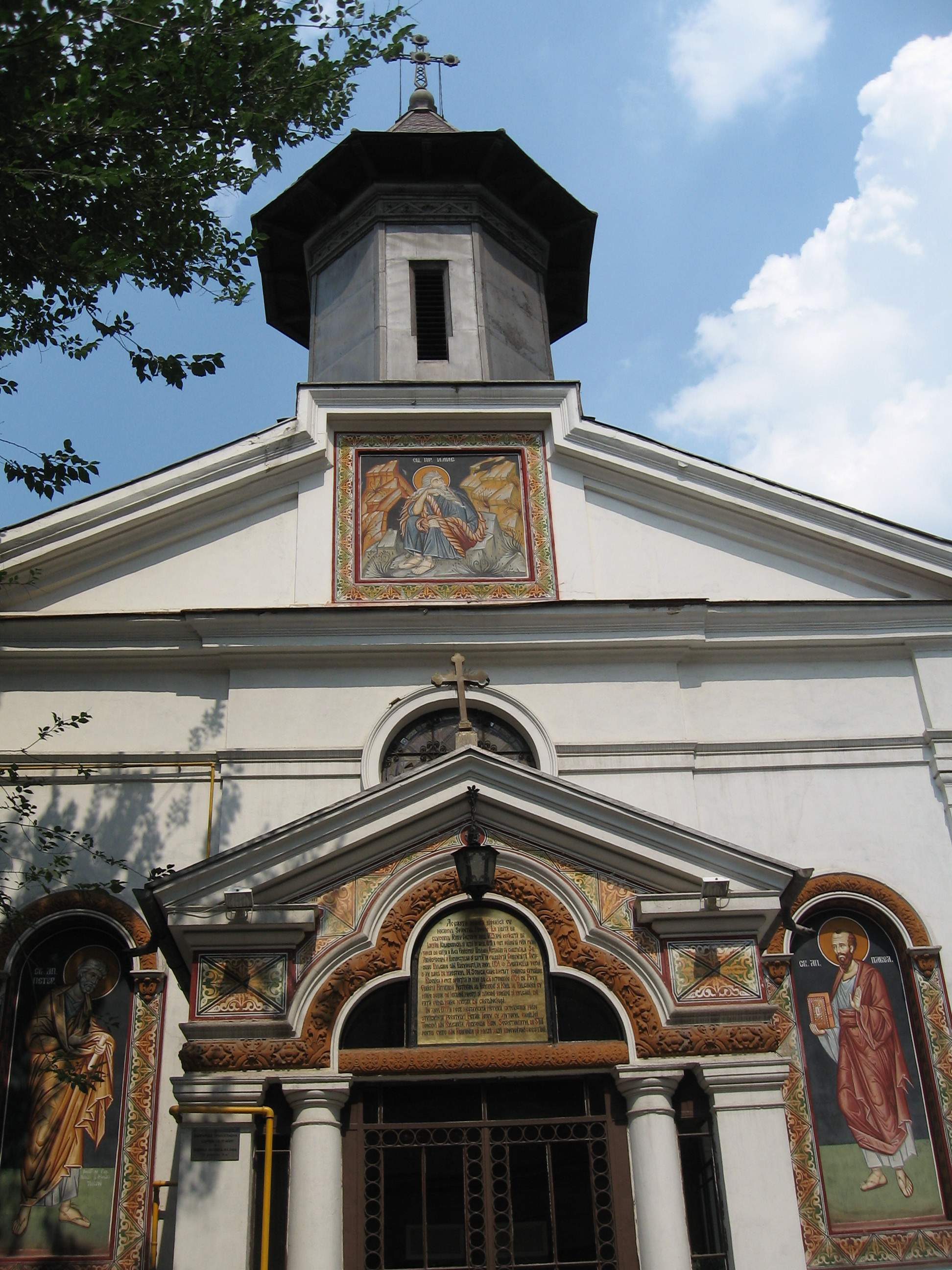
Bulgarian Orthodox Church of Saint Elijah the Prophet, Bucharest (1954-2009)

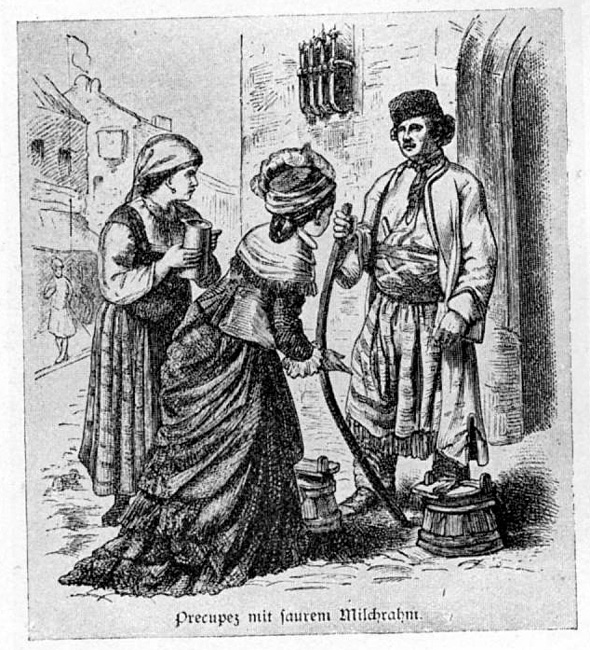
Bulgarian milk merchant in Bucharest (1880)

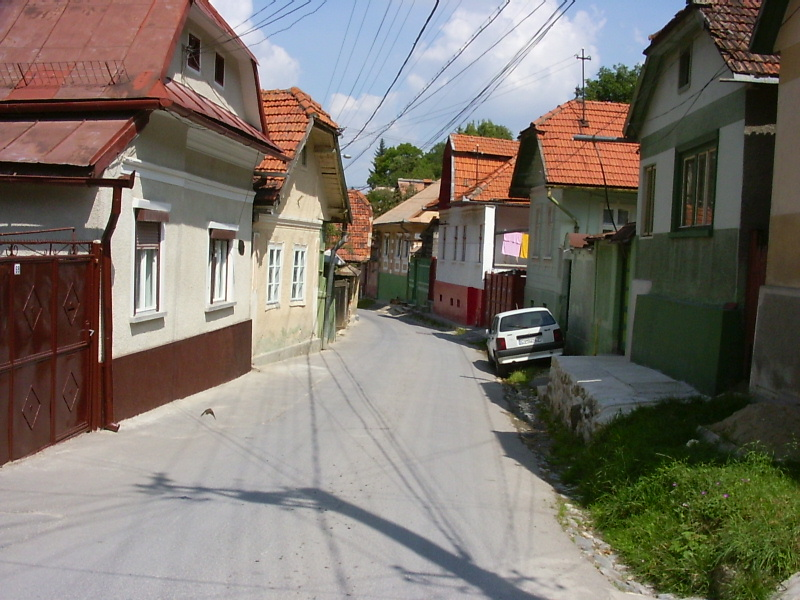
Șcheii Brașovului, the once-Bulgarian-inhabited neighbourhood of medieval Braşov (Kronstadt)

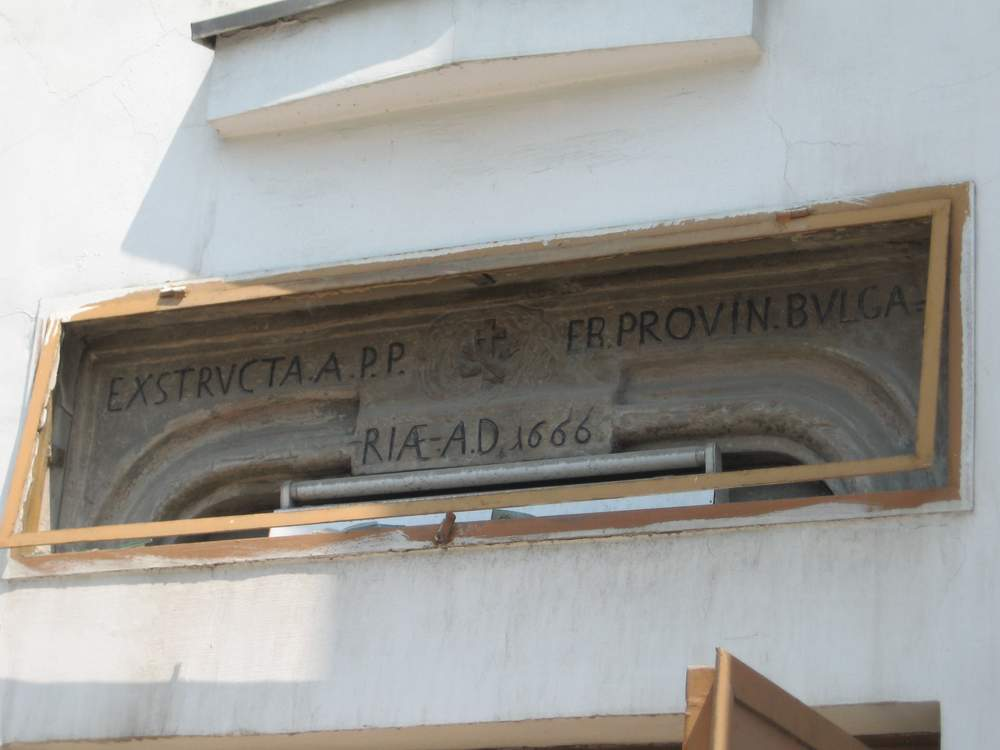
Inscription from 1666 on the Bucharest Bărăţia saying it was built by franciscans from the "Province of Bulgaria"

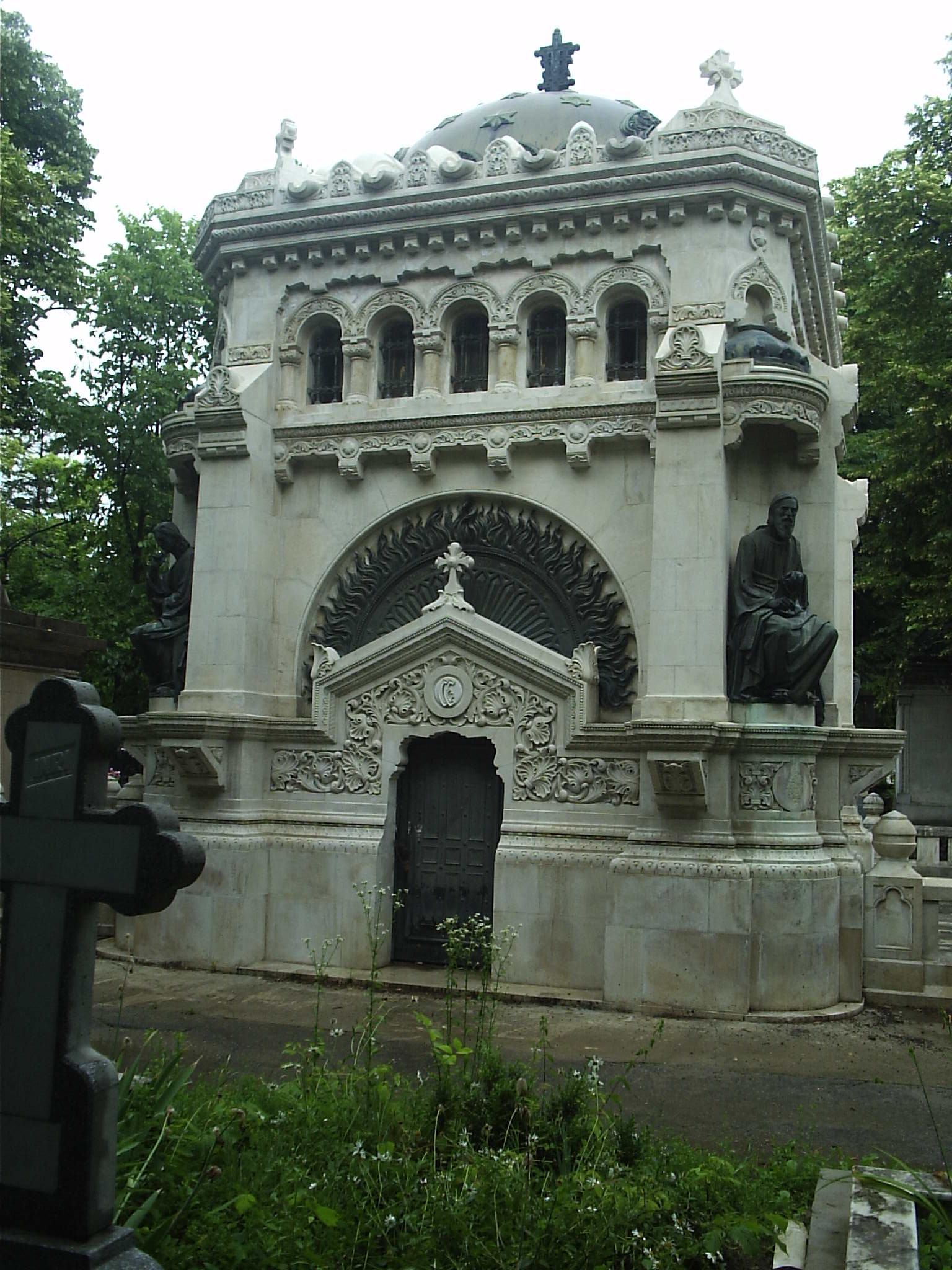
The Evlogi and Hristo Georgievi tomb in the Bellu cemetery of Bucharest

== See also ==
- Bulgaria–Romania relations
- Banat Bulgarians
- Bessarabian Bulgarians
- Dobrujan Bulgarians
- Șchei, Șcheii Brașovului
- Minorities of Romania
- Bulgarians in Hungary
- Bulgarians in Serbia
- Romanians in Bulgaria
