= Khristo Ivanov =

Bulgarian chemist

- Ivanov in 1980
- Born: 3 May 1916; Dobrich, Bulgaria
- Died: 16 February 2004 (aged 87); Sofia, Bulgaria
- Scientific career
- Fields: Organic Chemistry, Organic Synthesis
- Workplaces: University of Sofia, Faculty of Chemistry and Pharmacy

Khristo Ivanov (Bulgarian: Христо Иванов) (3 May 1916 – 16 February 2004) was a Bulgarian organic chemist.

== Life and career ==
Khristo Ivanov (Bulgarian: Христо Иванов) was born on 3 May 1916 in the town of Dobrich, Bulgaria. His father Ivan Khristov was a hardware man, who died in 1918 after having fought in World War I, when Khristo Ivanov was just two. His mother, Elena Khristova, took care of her one and only son. Khristo Ivanov obtained his degree in chemistry from the Physico-Mathematical Faculty of Sofia University in 1939. After teaching Chemistry at school level in the towns of Popovo and Karlovo for a few years, he acquired the position of regular Assistant Professor at the same faculty in 1946. He specialized in the field of organic synthesis at the universities of Leipzig (1953–1954) and Moscow (1956–1957). His academic career is associated with the University of Sofia – its Physico-Mathematical Faculty and the later Faculty of Chemistry that branched off from it (1961). He received an Associate Professorship in 1957 and full Professorship and the Chair of Organic Chemistry in 1963. Ivanov was Head of the Department of Organic Chemistry from 1963 until his retirement in 1984, Vice Rector of Sofia University (1962–1968), Dean of the Faculty of Chemistry (1972–1976). He was member of the Presidium (1980–1986) and later President of the Committee of Chemical Sciences of the Higher Attestation Commission. For the contribution to the advancement of science in his research, he was awarded the Cyril-and-Methodius medal (1st degree), the People's-Republic-of-Bulgaria medal (1st degree), and the Honorary medallion with Necklace of the "St. Kliment Ohridski" University of Sofia.

Ivanov died on 16 February 2004 at the age of 87 after a short illness. On the occasion the 100th anniversary of hir birth a comprehensive biographical article was recently published.

== Scientific works ==
Khristo Ivanov continued the research started by his predecessor Dimitar Ivanov of the Bulgarian Academy of Sciences, publishing over 125 scientific papers and raising the Bulgarian school of Organic Chemistry to an international level. His main interests focused on the reactivity of CH-acidic compounds in an attempt to solve fundamental problems in the chemistry of carbanions and organometallic compounds. The results obtained allowed the elaboration of various synthetic methods for preparation of new organic compounds.

In collaboration with Peter Markov, Ivanov established for the first time the possibility for metalation of CH-acidic compounds with magnesium in liquid ammonia. He attempted to clarify the structure of the prepared organomagnesium compounds and explained the obtained results with the phenomenon of metalotropy. In acknowledgement of these scientific achievements the team was given in 1979 the Prof. Asen Zlatarov Award by the Bulgarian Academy of Sciences.

The Laboratory of Organic Synthesis supervised by Ivanov also achieved a number of breakthroughs in organic synthesis. New synthetic methods were developed, involving the reaction of ambident nucleophilic reagents (prepared by metalation of esters, nitriles and amides of alkanoic and arylacetic acids) with N-acylated aldimines and ketimines. The resulting new derivatives of 3-acylaminopropanoic acids were transformed into various heterocyclic compounds: beta-lactams, 1,3-oxazines, 2-imidazolidinones, etc.

Ivanov and his lab studied in detail the reaction of 2-benzylbenzazoles with aromatic aldehydes under phase-transfer catalysis or in aprotic solvents in the presence of a water solution of sodium hydroxide leading to 2-styrylbenzazols or alcohols having a benzazole ring. Detailed studies have been done under the conditions of the Michael reaction on the addition of metallic derivatives of CH-acidic compounds to substrates containing carbonyl or azomethine group or to substrates with an activated double bond.

Ivanov was the initiator of studies on the reaction of nucleophilic reagents with coumarins. A new interesting rearrangement of 3-substituted coumarins to 2-oxochromans-4-acetic acid derivatives was found for the first time. It is used for elaboration of preparative methods for conversion of nitriles, esters and amides of coumarin-3-carboxylic acid into the corresponding rearranged products.
