= Place Under the Sun =

Place under the sun (Myasto pod slantzeto)
- Directed by: Rumen Surdzhiyski
- Written by: Tziliya Lacheva
- Produced by: Studios for Feature Films - Second Creative Team
- Starring: Maria Kavardjikova; Elzhana Popova; Emilia Radeva; Dorotea Toncheva; Tzvetana Dyankova; Minka Syulemezova; Antoaneta Kolarova; Zlatina Todeva; Desislava Stoycheva; Stefan Mavrodiyev and others...
- Cinematography: Teodor Yanev
- Music by: Antoni Donchev
- Release date: February 16, 1986
- Running time: 92 minutes
- Country: Bulgaria
- Language: Bulgarian

"Place under the sun" (Bulgarian: "Мя́сто под слъ́нцето" or translit.: "Myа́sto pod slа́ntzeto") is a 1986 Bulgarian drama film, directed by Rumen Surdzhiyski. Screenplay writer is Tziliya Lacheva. Cinematographer is Teodor Yanev. The music of the film is composed by Antoni Donchev. Production designer is Tzvetana Yankova and costume designer is Epsimania Banova. The film was shot in the then emblematic factories from the Bulgarian textile industry - the wool-textile factory "Dimitar Blagoev" in Kazanlak and "8th of March" factory in Sofia. Today, those factories do not operate anymore.

== About the film ==
""Place under the sun" is a portrait of the womеn working in the textile industry, who live "without mask and makeup". The screenwriter knew well the life and nature of her characters, their pains and aspirations. In the screenplay, everything looked vital, plausible, convincing, it was simply "begging" to be transferred to the screen.

In this period of development of Bulgarian cinema, there was an acute lack of films, in which the main character was the common worker. Their world also deserved to be studied, described and recreated. The film was made according to the canons of ideological and aesthetic requirements of the period, but is an honest attempt to fill this gap." (Rumen Surdzhiyski)

== Cast ==
Cast overview:

Maria Kavardjikova ...as Nikula
Elzhana Popova ...as Kina
Emilia Radeva ...as Damyana
Dorotea Toncheva ...as Leftera
Tzvetana Dyankova ...as Hadzhikoleva
Minka Syulemezova ...as Kaliopa
Antoaneta Kolarova ...as Violeta
Zlatina Todeva ...as Sofka
Desislava Stoycheva ...as Spaska
Stefan Mavrodiyev ...as the Director
Andrey Andreev ...as Lyuli
Dimitar Banenkin ...as Damyana's son
Nikola Todev ...as Bay Petko
Radko Dishliev ...as Asen
Hristo Stoykov ...as The little Dancho

and others...

== Reviews ==
"The beginning of 1986 has brought us several good films, which not only inspire us with hope, but also arm us with more arguments against the greyness of the last year's production. These are the already mentioned Nineteen Meters of Wind by Nikolai Valchinov and Vladimir Kraev; All for Love by Nikolai Volev and Chavdar Shinov; Cry for Help, by Boyan Biolchev and Nikola Rudarov; "My Darling, My Darling", by Eduard Zahariev and Plamen Maslarov, created from the collection of novels by Alexander Tomov; "Place Under the Sun", by Tziliya Lacheva and Rumen Surdzhiyski. These films bring us back our trust in the characters on the screen, make us believe in their aspirations, connect us with their experiences, compel us to consider their problems and what is even more important, to take sides on them. Here the synchronization between the literature pathos and the screen realization is close, the story line goes lively, full-blooded and as a result we once again have living characters, real conflicts, convincing emotions."

== Sources ==
- "Encyclopedia Bulgarian Cinema AZ - Personalities, Films", Author: Alexander Yanakiev, Titra Publishing House, 2000, ISBN 9549048624, pp. 447 - 448
- "April Literary Discussion", Publisher: Union of Bulgarian Writers, 1986 (the original is from the University of Michigan), book 1, p. 181
- April Literary Discussion, Vоl. 2, Author: Todor ABAZOV, Publisher: Union of Bulgarian Writers, 1986, p. 181
