= Cella Serghi =

Romanian prose writer (1907–1992)

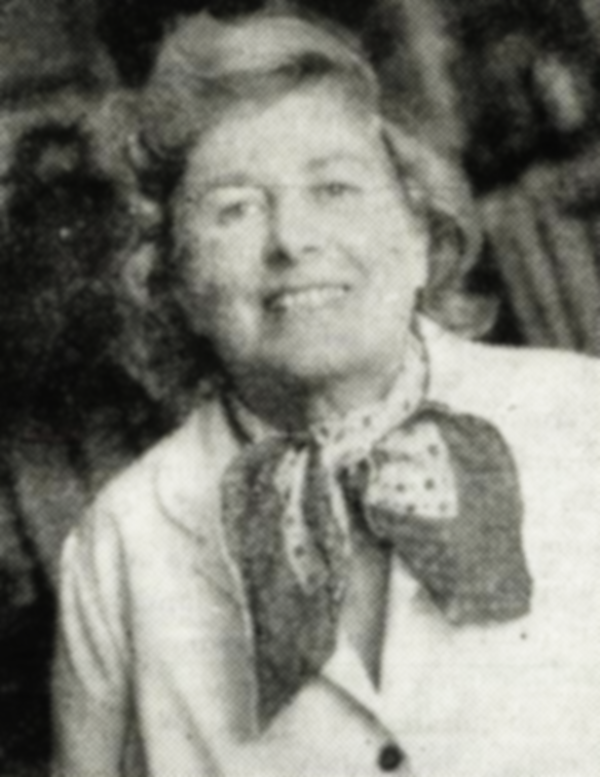
Serghi in 1984

Cella Serghi (born Cella Marcoff; November 4, 1907 – 1992) was a Romanian prose writer.

She was born in Constanța to Avram Marcoff, a minor employee of private firms, and his wife Carolina (née Golestan). She attended primary school in her native city from 1915 to 1916, but continued in Bucharest after fleeing home at the onset of Romania's involvement in World War I. There, she went to gymnasium and high school from 1919 to 1927, and attended the law faculty of the University of Bucharest from 1927 to 1931. For a time, she worked as a lawyer. In 1945, she was secretary of a free people's university. She made her written debut in Gazeta newspaper with articles such as "Weekend în Bucegi, toamna" and "Match de football", while her first book, the 1938 novel Pânza de păianjen, was also her undisputed masterpiece. Her pen name, which was inspired by her grandfather Serghi Marcoff, who was of Bulgarian origin, became official in 1945.

Her writings for the first two decades after the 1944 Romanian coup d'état were strongly influenced by the prevailing socialist realist style and content of the first part of the communist regime. Some of these were substantially revised in later years: Cad zidurile, 1950 (this became Cartea Mironei in 1965 and Mirona in 1975); Cântecul uzinei, 1950; S-a dumirit și Moș Ilie, 1950; Surorile, 1951; Cantemiriștii, 1954; Fetele lui Barotă, 1958 (reissued as Iubiri paralele in 1974); Gențiane, 1970. Her 1977 memoir Pe firul de păianjen al memoriei deals with her artistic training and the process of writing her debut novel. She also wrote a children's book, the 1980 În căutarea somnului uriaș; and another novel, Această dulce vară, tinerețea, from 1983. She translated work by Françoise Sagan in collaboration with Catinca Ralea, and produced solo translations of Françoise Mallet-Joris and Andrée Chedid. Among the magazines that published her work were Reporter, Revista Fundațiilor Regale, Democrația (where she had a film and theatre column), Viața Românească, Femeia, Căminul, Flacăra and România Literară.
