= Snapshots as Souvenirs =

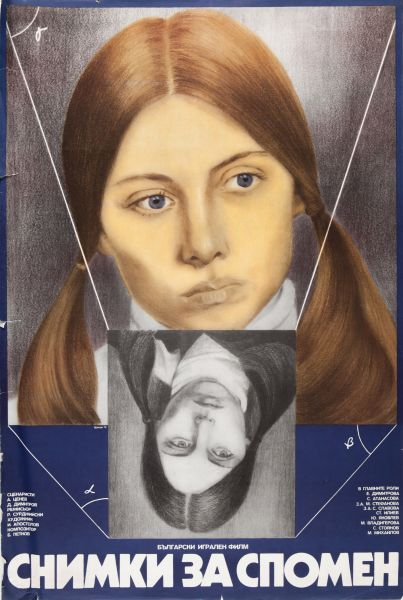
- Directed by: Rumen Surdzhiyski
- Written by: Emil Manov and Atanas Tzenev
- Produced by: Studios for Feature Films – Creative Team "Savremennik"
- Starring: Elena Dimitrova; Svetlana Atanasova; Mikhail Mikhaylov; Iskra Genkova; Maya Vladigerovа; Rashko Mladenov; Slavka Slavova; Stefan Iliev; Yuriy Yakovlev; Maria Stefanova; Atanas Bozhinov; Lyuben Petrov; Valentin Gadzhokov; Boyka Velkova
- Cinematography: Vyacheslav Anev
- Music by: Bozhidar Petkov
- Distributed by: Studios for feature films "Boyana"
- Release date: August 13, 1979
- Running time: 85 minutes
- Country: Bulgaria
- Language: Bulgarian

Snapshots as Souvenirs (Bulgarian: Сни́мки за спо́мен, romanized: Snímki za spómen) is a 1976 Bulgarian drama film, by the director Rumen Surdzhiyski. The film was shot in Sofia, in the building of what is today the National Finance and Economics High School, located in "Lozenetz" quarter. Its first theatrical screening took place on 13 August 1979.

The screenplay is based on the novel My First Summer, by Emil Manov.

== Synopsis ==
Snapshots as Souvenirs is a youth film, which depicts the inevitable tribulations and hurdles, through which the adolescents go through, in the complex school environment. Tribulations, which put to test concepts, such as friendship, honor and dignity. Tribulations, which will ever remain in the minds of each of us like snapshots – souvenirs for a lifetime.

== Cast and crew ==
Screenplay writer of the film is Atanas Tzenev. Cinematographer is Vyacheslav Anev. The production designer is Ivan Apostolov. The music of the film is composed by Bozhidar Petkov.

Cast overview:

- Elena Dimitrova – as Sashka
- Svetlana Atanasova – as Nikolina
- Mikhail Mikhaylov – as Mihail
- Iskra Genkova – as Roza
- Maya Vladigerovа – as the mother
- Rashko Mladenov – as Stanimir
- Slavka Slavova – as Mrs. Fileva – the literature teacher
- Stefan Iliev – as Todorov
- Yuriy Yakovlev – as Nikolina's father
- Maria Stefanova
- Atanas Bozhinov
- Lyuben Petrov
- Valentin Gadzhokov
- Boyka Velkova

== Review ==
"With director Rumen Surdzhiyski and screenplay writers – Atanas Tzenev and Dimitar Dimitrov, as well as the rest of filmmakers, Emil Manov's novel has found faithful interpreters and adherents. The novel, which years ago gave such a lively resonance among our readers, recreated on the screen, now it will relate to many more viewers.

Manov, Surdzhiyski and the rest of the filmmakers, apparently do not wish to caress, comfort or put us to sleep with idyllic stories and happy endings. They bother us with drama of consciousness. Their film is one of those truthful, honest works which without obsessive edification, but decisively and uncompromisingly fight for justice, strive to awake good feelings in us.

Rumen Surdzhiyski proves that he possesses acute power of observation towards the spiritual phenomena in our society and the problems of the time we live in."

— "Defenders of the truth", Author: Alexander Alexandrov, "Narodna Kultura" Newspaper, 1979

== Sources ==
- "Snimki za spomen" in Film titles, General index, vol. 6, page 23, 24, 59
- "Snimki za spomen" in Variety Film Reviews 1907–1980, vol. 16, page 230
- "Snimki za Spomen" as "Snapshots as Souvenirs" (1979) in "Keeping score: film music 1972-1979", pages 215, 295 – the composer Bozhidar Petkov
- "Snapshots as Souvenirs" as "СНИМКИ ЗА СПОМЕН" (1979) in cinema.bg
- "Снимки за спомен" as "Snapshots as Souvenirs" (1979) in "Bulgarian feature films: Annotated Illustrated Filmography 1971-1980", Vol. 3; Original title: "Български игрални филми: анотирана илюстрована филмография. 1971-1980", Том 3, ISBN 9789543160693, page 308
