= Vasin =

Vasin (Russian: Васин) is a Russian male surname that is derived from Vasiliy, the male given name Vasily, and literally means "Vasya's". Its feminine counterpart is Vasina (Russian: Васина). It may refer to:

- Denys Vasin (born 1989), Ukrainian footballer
- Miroslav Vasin (born 1955), Serbian politician
- Ted Vasin (born 1966), American artist
- Viktor Vasin (born 1988), Russian footballer
- Vladimir Vasin (born 1947), Soviet diver
