= Vasyanovich =

Vasyanovich (Russian: Васянович) is a Russian surname. Notable people with the surname include:

- Andrei Vasyanovich (born 1988), Russian footballer
- Sergei Vasyanovich (born 1982), Russian footballer

== See also ==
- Vasya (disambiguation)
