= St. Elijah–Colței Inn Church =

Heritage site in Bucharest, Romania

Coordinates: 44°25′59″N 26°06′10″E

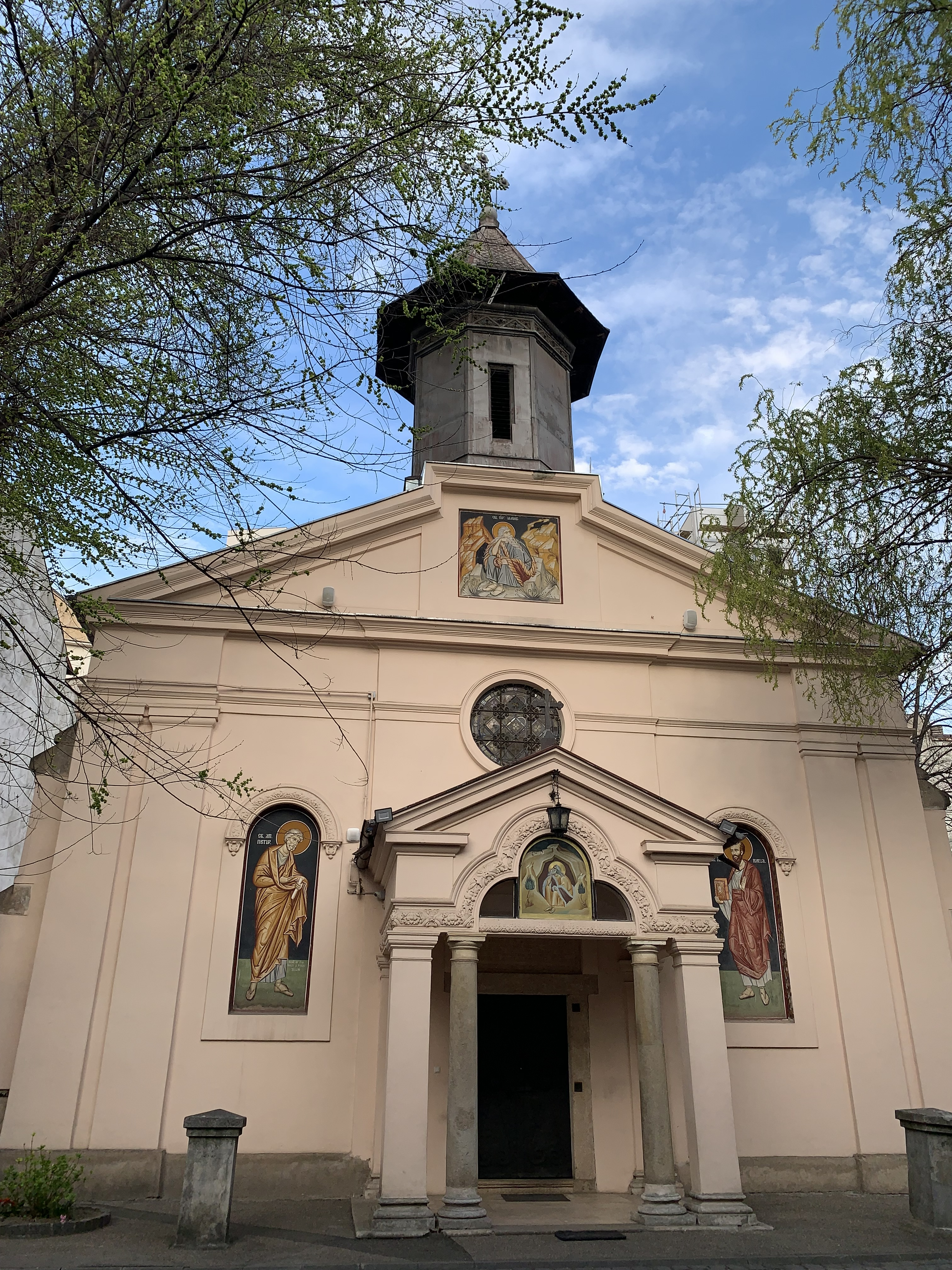
St. Elijah–Colței Inn Church

The St. Elijah–Colței Inn Church (Romanian: Biserica Sfântul Ilie–Hanul Colței) is a Romanian Orthodox church located at 18 Doamnei Street in the Lipscani quarter of Bucharest, Romania. It is dedicated to the Prophet Elijah.

Reportedly, around 1725–1730, Clucer Radu Colțea built a wooden church on land that passed to the Colței Inn after 1745. In 1841, inn manager Lazăr Kalenderoglu demolished the church and built the present one a short distance away; both had as their patron Elijah, the protector of travelers by land. In 1954, the Bucharest Archdiocese renovated the church and handed it over to the local Bulgarian community. The grant was formalized that October during a re-sanctification ceremony involving Romanian Patriarch Justinian, his Bulgarian counterpart Cyril and a large number of priests from both countries. In 2009, as part of an effort to reclaim properties lost under the communist regime, the Romanian Church reclaimed the building, which underwent restoration and consolidation in 2012-2015.

Located at the end of a yard, the basilica-shaped church measures 22.5 meters long by 13 meters wide. It has three naves, the central one being longer than the others, with its semicircular altar apse. The small octagonal bell tower on the western facade is covered in tin, with a pyramidal roof. Entrance is through a small vestibule with a pediment featuring a three-lobed arch resting on simple columns and corner pilasters. The long ceiling of the main nave is flat, while the lateral naves have curved ceilings each resting on three columns. A round window above the entrance lights the wooden choir area. The facades are decorated with neoclassical touches: pilasters support an architrave and cornice slightly in profile. The western facade has a trapezoidal pediment merging into the base of the dome. The sides have two rows of buttresses that sustain pressure from the ceiling arches. The interior is painted in fresco, while the entrance is flanked by icons in niches of Saints Peter and Paul.

The church is listed as a historic monument by Romania's Ministry of Culture and Religious Affairs, as is the late-19th century parish house.
