= Branislav Bogaroški =

Serbian politician (born 1976)

Branislav Bogaroški (Serbian Cyrillic: Бранислав Богарошки; born 9 November 1976) is a politician in Serbia. He is a member of the League of Social Democrats of Vojvodina (LSV), currently serving as a party vice-president and as the leader of the party's parliamentary group in the Assembly of Vojvodina. He was previously a vice-president of Vojvodina's government and provincial secretary responsible for agriculture, water management, and forestry from 2014 to 2016.

== Early life and career ==
Bogaroški was born in Novi Sad, in what was then the Socialist Autonomous Province of Vojvodina in the Socialist Republic of Serbia, Socialist Federal Republic of Yugoslavia. He received his early education in Zrenjanin and later graduated from the University of Belgrade Faculty of Law. He has worked at the Novi Sad municipal court and been the director of the public transit company JGSP Novi Sad.

== Politician ==
Bogaroški became a member of the LSV in 1996. He sought election to the National Assembly of Serbia in the 2003 Serbian parliamentary election, appearing in the twenty-second position on the LSV's Together for Tolerance electoral list. The list did not cross the electoral threshold to win representation in the assembly. He also ran in the 2007 Serbian parliamentary election, receiving the thirty-first position on a coalition list that included the Liberal Democratic Party, the LSV, and other parties. The list won fifteen seats, and he was not selected for a mandate. (From 2000 to 2011, Serbian parliamentary mandates were awarded to sponsoring parties or coalitions rather than to individual candidates, and it was common practice for the mandates to be awarded out of numerical order. Bogaroški could have been awarded a mandate despite his relatively low position on the list – which was in any event mostly alphabetical – though in fact he was not.)

=== Member of the Assembly of Vojvodina (2008–14) ===
Bogaroški was first elected to the Vojvodina assembly in the 2008 provincial election; he received the second position on the LSV's Together for Vojvodina list and was included in the party's assembly delegation when the list won five proportional mandates. (During this time, half of the seats in the assembly were determined by proportional representation and the other half by constituency elections.) He was subsequently chosen as the party's assembly leader. The election was won by the For a European Vojvodina coalition led by the Democratic Party, with which the LSV was aligned. Bogaroški served as a supporter of the province's coalition government and, in this period, was a vocal advocate for a new constitution that would restore the autonomy taken from Vojvodina two decades earlier.

In late 2008, Bogaroški introduced a proposal for the government of Serbia to provide the equivalent of 840 million Euros to Vojvodina as compensation for having sold Naftna Industrija Srbije, a major petroleum company based in Novi Sad, for what he described as "a pittance." The motion was defeated after failing to win the support of the Democratic Party. Bogaroški later urged the Vojvodina Assembly to be recalled for an emergency session if the Serbian parliament did not approve Vojvodina's new constitution; the constitution was ultimately approved in November 2009.

The electoral systems of both Serbia and Vojvodina were reformed in 2011, such that parliamentary mandates were awarded in numerical order to candidates on successful lists. Bogaroški received the fourth position on the LSV's list in the 2012 provincial election and was re-elected when it won eight seats via the proportional system. The Democratic Party's alliance and the LSV together won enough seats for a majority, and the LSV continued to serve on the government side. Bogaroški became a vice-president of the LSV at a party convention in December 2012.

The Vojvodina Assembly approved the Declaration on Protecting the Constitutional and Legal Rights of the Autonomous Province of Vojvodina in May 2013. This document proved contentious, in part because of a clause added by Bogaroški recognizing that the autonomy of Vojvodina is the inalienable historical and natural right of its citizens, as it was established and confirmed by its peoples at the Assembly of the Vojvodina People's Delegates organized by victorious Yugoslav Partisan forces in July 1945. Bogaroški said that this statement affirmed the declaration's anti-fascist values; parties that reject the legitimacy of the 1945 assembly were critical of its inclusion.

=== Member of the Vojvodina government (2014–16) ===
The Democratic Party experienced a serious split in 2014, which led to a restructuring of Vojvodina's government on 3 November of that year. Bogaroški was appointed as one of the province's three vice-presidents and as provincial secretary for agriculture, water management, and forestry. In this capacity, he was a frequent critic of Serbia's minister of agriculture and environment, Snežana Bogosavljević Bošković. In 2015, Bogosavljević Bošković proposed leasing part of Serbia's unused state land to investors with thirty-year leases. Bogaroški called for this proposal to be withdrawn, charging that parts of it were unconstitutional and expressing particular concern over a provision that would allow foreign investors to purchase the land after two years. He also criticized the Serbian government for reducing farm subsidies and, in 2016, accused it of creating "wild west" conditions of farmland ownership in Sombor via a provision for farmers to continue operating illegally usurped land in return for rental fees.

=== Return to the Assembly of Vojvodina (2016–) ===
Bogaroški appeared at the head of the LSV's list in the 2016 provincial election and was re-elected to a third term when the list won nine mandates. This election was won by the Serbian Progressive Party and its allies; Bogaroški stood down from his government position, and the LSV moved into opposition. He was also a candidate for the National Assembly in the concurrent 2016 Serbian parliamentary election, receiving the fiftieth position on a combined list of the LSV, the Liberal Democratic Party, and the Social Democratic Party. This was too low a position for election to be a realistic prospect, and indeed he was not elected when the list won only thirteen mandates.
