= Vassya Bankova =

Bulgarian chemist

- Born: 1954 (age 71–72); Sofia
- Education: University of Chemical Technology and Metallurgy
- Scientific career
- Fields: chemistry
- Workplaces: Bulgarian Academy of Sciences

Vassya Stefanova Bankova (Bulgarian: Вася Стефанова Банкова, romanized: Vasya Stefanova Bankova; born 1954, in Sofia) is a Bulgarian chemist and a president of the Bulgarian Phytochemical Society, Correspondent Member of the Bulgarian Academy of Sciences since 2014. Bankova is a professor and Chief of the Chemistry of Natural Compounds Laboratory, at the Institute of Organic Chemistry with Centre of Phytochemistry (IOCCP), Bulgarian Academy of Sciences. She is also an honorary professor on the Faculty of Chemistry and Pharmacy, Sofia University. She is known as a propolis expert.

She graduated from the University of Chemical Technology and Metallurgy in 1977. She obtained her PhD at the IOCCP in 1990, and obtained her degree of Doktor nauk (DSc.) from the same institute in 2000.

In 2005 she was promoted to a Full Professor at the IOCCP. Since 2009, the Chief of the IOCCP Chemistry of Natural Compounds Laboratory.

She is a member of the Editorial Board of Chemistry Central Journal.

== Works ==
- V. Bankova. Chemical diversity of propolis and the problem of standardization. J. Ethnopharmacol. 100 (1-2), 114—117 (2005).
- V. Bankova, B. Trusheva., M.Popova. New developments in propolis chemical diversity studies (since 2000) In: N. Orsolich & I. Basic (Eds), Scientific Evidence of Use of Propolis in Ethnomedicine, 1-13, Transworld Research Network, Trivandrum, 2008.
- V. Bankova, B. Trusheva. Chemical profiles of different propolis types in relation to their biological activity. In: T. Farooki and A. Farooki, Eds., Beneficial effects of propolis on human health and chronic diseases. Nova Science Publishers, New York. 2013.
