= Bulgarian vocabulary =

The lexis of Bulgarian, a South Slavic language, consists of native words, as well as borrowings from Russian, French, and to a lesser extent English, Greek, Ottoman Turkish, Arabic and other languages.

== Native lexical items ==
Around three-quarters of the vocabulary in the standard academic dictionaries of Bulgarian consist of native lexical items. Some 2,000 of these items are directly inherited from proto-Slavonic through Old and Middle Bulgarian. These include much of the most common and basic vocabulary of the language, for example body parts (Bulgarian: ръка “hand”) or cardinal numbers (Bulg.: две “two”). The number of words derived from the direct reflexes of proto-Slavonic is more than 20 times greater, accounting for more than 40,000 entries (for example, ръчен “manual”; двуместен “double-place”).

The old Bulgar language has otherwise left only slight traces in Modern Bulgarian. Apart from a small corpus of proper names (for example, Борис “Boris”; Крум “Krum”) and military and administrative titles from the time of the First Bulgarian Empire, only a handful of Bulgar words has survived in Modern Bulgarian. Words which are considered to be almost certainly of Bulgar origin are, for example: бъбрек “kidney”, бисер “pearl”, кумир “idol”, чертог “castle”. Some of these words even spread to other Slavic languages through Old Church Slavonic.

== Patterns of borrowing ==
As of the beginning of the 1960s, loanwords amounted to some 25% of the vocabulary of the standard dictionary of Bulgarian. Important sources of borrowing were Latin and Greek, each accounting for around a quarter of all borrowings, more specifically, Latin (around 26%) and Greek (around 23%). French vocabulary contribution to the Bulgarian language totals around 15% and Ottoman Turkish (along with Arabic and Persian) totalled around 14%, whereas loanwords from Russian accounted for 10% of the borrowings. Lesser but still significant influence was exerted by Italian (around 4%), German (around 4%) and English (around 2%).

=== Character of borrowing ===
Loanwords from Greek were the first to enter the lexis of Bulgarian, as early as the time of Old Bulgarian, (for example, икона “icon” or патриарх “patriarch”) as a product of the influence of the liturgical language of the Orthodox Church. During the period of Ottoman rule, Bulgarian adopted from Greek both common lexical material (хиляда “a thousand”) and international vocabulary of Greek origin (граматика “grammar”). Loanwords from Latin were adopted mainly in the second half of the 19th and the first half of the 20th centuries,, and the vast majority of them are international terms in the areas of politics, civil administration, medicine, law, etc. (for example, администрация “administration”). Borrowings from French cover a similar time span and are concentrated in the areas of social and political life, military affairs, cooking, the arts, etc. (бюфет “buffet”).

Loanwords from Turkish (and through Turkish from Arabic and Persian) are a legacy of the period of Ottoman rule (1422–1878) and are divided into two stylistic layers. The first one is neutral and is represented by a corpus of some 800 words, mostly items of clothing, foods and household items (чорап “sock”; чекмедже “drawer”). The remainder consists of colloquial or slightly vulgar terms which occur particularly often in expressive speech and frequently have a humoristic or even pejorative nuance. They generally have neutral native synonyms (cf акъл from Turkish vs ум from common Slavic, both meaning “wits, intelligence”). There is a fluent transition between this group and a large amount of more or less obsolete words that only occur in archaic or dialectal speech.

English is the only language that has significantly influenced Bulgarian since the 1950s. The share of English borrowings at present is much larger than the 2% in the 1960s and most likely lies between 10% and 15% of all borrowings. The impact of English is particularly strong in technology, sports, dress, the arts, music and popular culture: корнер “corner” (football), пънк “punk”.

=== Examples ===
Some very frequent expressions have been borrowed from other languages. Most of them are somewhat informal.

- Мерси (mersí) – Thank you; from French merci (although this word is probably even more common than native Благодаря, it is inappropriate in very official or solemn contexts)
- Чао (cháo) – Bye; from Italian ciao (the informal counterpart of native Довиждане, this word is more common than the native)
- Супер (súper) – Super; (from Latin, colloquial; note – "super" remains the same regardless of quantity or gender, although an even more colloquial adjective суперски (súperski) does decline as usual)
- Ало (álo) – Hello on the phone; from French allô (unlike the above, this word is stylistically neutral).

=== Statistics ===
Bulgarian lexis according to word origin
directly inherited from Proto-Slavic	50%
later formations	30%
foreign borrowings	17%

Foreign borrowings in Bulgarian (1955-59)
Latin	26%
Greek	23%
French	15%
Turkish, Arabic, Persian	14%
Russian	10%
Italian	4%
German	4%
English	2%
other	4%

== Comparison with other Slavic languages ==
Most Slavic languages demonstrate a higher degree of shared vocabulary with one another than English does with the Germanic family due to the number of Romance loans in English on the one hand, and on the other hand due to the influences on Slavic languages of Russian or Church Slavonic, which was a Southeast Slavic language. The adoption of Church Slavonic morphology and vocabulary was used to enrich other Slavic languages. It is especially pronounced in Russian, which today consists of mixed native and Church Slavonic (South Slavic) vocabulary, analogically to the Romance vocabulary of English, but in Russian the Church Slavonisms are not perceived as foreign due to their Slavic roots. An estimated 55% of Russian, incl. vocabulary, syntactic features, etc. goes back to the Church Slavonic language, known as Old Bulgarian, while 70% of Church Slavonic words are common to all Slavic languages. Some authors argue that the Southeast Slavic language Church Slavonic is the "passkey" to the Russian nation and language.

Nouns
Bulgarian	Macedonian	Serbо-Croatian	Russian	Polish	English
дърво	дрво	дрво/drvo	дерево	drzewo	tree
картоф/компир/барабой	компир	кромпир/krumpir	картофель	ziemniak, kartofel	potato
котка/маца/мачка	мачка	мачка/mačka	кошка	kot	cat
куче, пес	куче, пес	пас/pas, куче/kuče	собака, пёс	pies	dog
къща, дом	куќа, дом	кућа/kuća, дом/dom	дом	dom	house, home
маса	маса	сто/stol	стол	stół	table (furniture)
мляко/млеко	млеко	млеко, млијеко/mlijeko	молоко	mleko	milk
стол	стол	столица/stolica	стул	krzesło	chair

Verbs
Bulgarian	Macedonian	Serbо-Croatian	Russian	Polish	English
имам	имам	имам/imam	имею	mam	I have
искам, желая, ща	сакам	желим, хоћу/želim, hoću	хочу, желаю	chcę	I want
правя, върша	правам, вршам	вршим, радим/vršim, radim	делаю	robię	I do
ходя, вървя	одам, врвам	ходам/hodam	хожу	chodzę	I walk
говоря, думам, приказвам, казвам, сборя	зборувам, говорам	говорим/govorim	говорю	mówię	I talk
намирам	наоѓам	налазим/nalazim	нахожу	znajduję	I find
ям	јадам, ручам	једем/jedem	ем	jem	I eat
пия	пијам	пијем/pijem	пью	piję	I drink

== See also ==
- Bulgarian language
