= University of Chemical Technology and Metallurgy =

University in Sofia, Bulgaria

Coordinates: 42.6569°N 23.3578°E

- Химикотехнологичният и металургичен университет
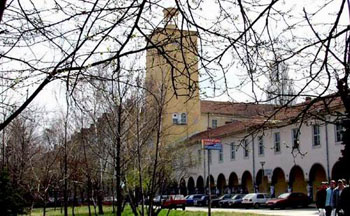
- Type: Public
- Established: 1953
- Rector: Prof. Mitko Georgiev, PhD
- Students: ~3800
- Location: Sofia, Bulgaria
- Campus: Urban

The University of Chemical Technology and Metallurgy (Bulgarian: Химикотехнологичният и металургичен университет) is a state university in Sofia, Bulgaria, founded in 1953.

== History ==
The university was established in 1953 as The Institute of Chemical Technology (HTI) with two faculties: Engineering-Chemical and Metallurgical. The first rector of the university was Boris Zagorchev.

== Structure ==
- Faculty of Chemical Technology
- Faculty of Chemical and System Engineering
- Faculty of Metallurgy and Materials Science
