= Faculty of Chemistry and Pharmacy, Sofia University =

Coordinates: 42°40′28.51″N 23°19′56.71″E

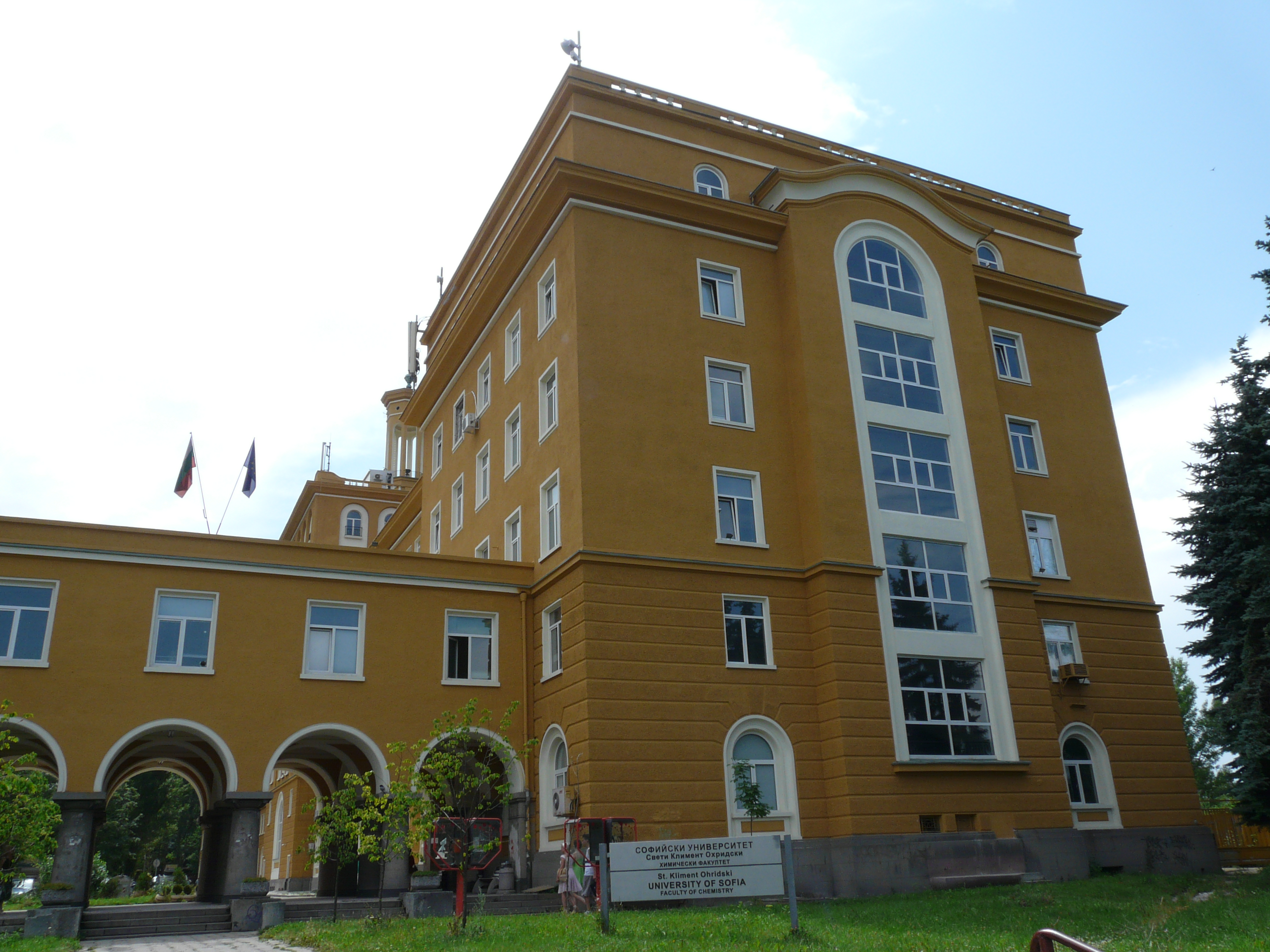
Building of The Faculty of Chemistry and Pharmacy in Sofa (Bulgaria)

The Faculty of Chemistry and Pharmacy, formerly the "Faculty of Chemistry", is a college of St. Kliment Ohridski University of Sofia, Bulgaria. It was renamed by a decision of the National Assembly of Bulgaria on February 24, 2012.

== Staff ==
- Vassya Bankova
