= 2016 Vojvodina provincial election =

Election in Serbia

- 24 April 2016
- All 120 seats in the Assembly of Vojvodina; 61 seats needed for a majority
- Turnout: 56.12%
Party	Leader	Vote %	Seats	+/–
SNS coalition	Maja Gojković	45.78	63	+41
SPS–JS	Dušan Bajatović	9.12	12	−1
SRS	Đurađ Jakšić	7.88	10	+5
DS coalition	Miroslav Vasin	7.45	10	−48
LSV	Branislav Bogaroški	6.62	9	−1
DJB	Svetlana Kozić	5.70	7	New
VMSZ	István Pásztor	5.03	6	−1
VMDK–MM	Tamás Korhecz	1.76	2	New
ZES	Branislava Jeftić	1.17	1	New
This lists parties that won seats. See the complete results below.
President of the Government before	President of the Government after
Bojan Pajtić; DS	Igor Mirović; SNS

A provincial election was held in Vojvodina on 24 April 2016.

== Electoral system ==
The 120 members of the Assembly are elected by proportional representation in a single provincial constituency with a 5% electoral threshold, although the threshold is disregarded for coalitions representing ethnic minorities. Seats are allocated using the d'Hondt method.

== Electoral lists ==
1. Serbian Progressive Party, Social Democratic Party of Serbia, Party of United Pensioners of Serbia, Movement of Socialists, Serbian Renewal Movement, New Serbia, Slovaks, Forward (Slovaci napred), Serb Democratic Party

2. Democratic Party, Democratic Alliance of Croats in Vojvodina, New Party

3. Socialist Party of Serbia, United Serbia, Patriotic Movement of Serbia (Patriotski pokret Srbije)

4. League of Social Democrats of Vojvodina

5. Alliance of Vojvodina Hungarians

6. Serbian Radical Party

7. Dveri, Democratic Party of Serbia

8. Liberal Democratic Party, Social Democratic Party

9. Narodni pokret Dinara—Drina—Dunav – Tomislav Bokan

10. Mađarski pokret za autonomiju - Dr Tamaš Korhec - Democratic Fellowship of Vojvodina Hungarians - Áron Csonka

11. Green Party

12. Srpsko ruski pokret – Aleksandar Đurđev

13. Za slobodnu Srbiju – Zavetnici – Milica Đurđević

14. „Vojvođanska tolerancija" (Vojvodina's Party, Montenegrin Party, Sandžačko Raška Partija)

15. Enough is Enough – Saša Radulović

== Opinion polls ==
Date	Polling Firm	SNS et al.	DS	SPS JS	SRS	LSV	SVM	Dveri	DSS	SDS	LDP	DJB	Others	Lead
28–31 Mar 2016	CeSID	41.2	6.2	8.5	7.6	12.0	8.0	7.6		2.9		5.4	–	29.2
17–26 Mar 2016	NSPM	41.0	10.3	8.2	8.2	8–9	8.5	5.2		3–4		4.1	–	30.7
15–25 Dec 2015	Faktor Plus	41.0	13.0	7.3	4.9	9.0	5.9 (All minorities combined)	4.9		6.0		2.0	–	28.0
21–27 May 2015	Faktor Plus	46.0	11.1	6.9	5.4	6.9	4.9	2.4	1.4	3.5	1.5	1.7	–	34.9
6 May 2012	Election result	18.3	21.0	11.3 (+PUPS+SDPS)	6.3	11.0	6.2	4.6	5.9	–	4.8	–	5.8	2.7

== Results ==
Party	Votes	%	Seats
SNS–SDPS–PUPS–NS–SPO–PS	428,452	45.78	63
SPS–JS–PPS	85,311	9.12	12
Serbian Radical Party	73,742	7.88	10
DS–DSHV–NOVA–ZEP	69,740	7.45	10
League of Social Democrats of Vojvodina	61,979	6.62	9
Enough is Enough	53,317	5.70	7
Alliance of Vojvodina Hungarians	47,034	5.03	6
Dveri–DSS	31,218	3.34	0
SDS–LDP	26,800	2.86	0
VMDK–MM	16,452	1.76	2
People's Movement Dinara-Drina-Dunav	15,285	1.63	0
Green Party	10,970	1.17	1
Serbo-Russian Movement	5,574	0.60	0
For a Free Serbia – Oathkeepers	5,000	0.53	0
Vojvodina Tolerance (VP–CP–SRP)	4,943	0.53	0
Total	935,817	100.00	120
Valid votes	935,817	97.23	
Invalid/blank votes	26,708	2.77	
Total votes	962,525	100.00	
Registered voters/turnout	1,729,376	55.66	
Source: PIK
