= Miroslav Vasin =

Miroslav Vasin Government of Vojvodina
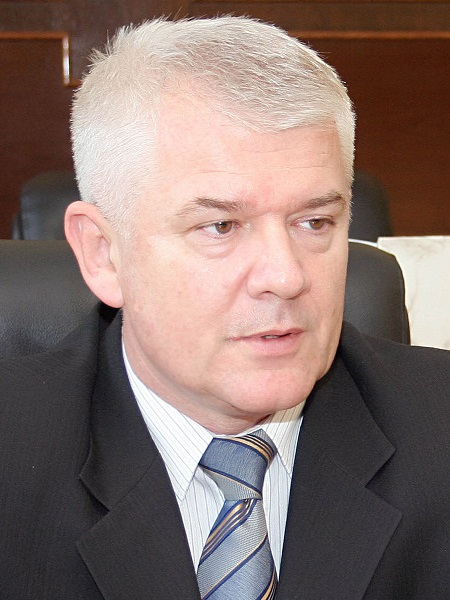

Vice President of the Government of Vojvodina

President of the Provincial Committee of the Democratic Party in Vojvodina

Personal details
- Born: 18 June 1955 (age 71) Belgrade, FPR Yugoslavia
- Party: Democratic Party
- Children: 3
- Education: University of Belgrade School of Law
- Occupation: Politician

Miroslav Vasin (Serbian Cyrillic: Мирослав Васин; born in 1955), is a Serbian politician. He has served as vice president of the Government of Vojvodina and president of the Provincial Committee of the Democratic Party in Vojvodina.

== Biography ==
Vasin was born on 18 June 1955 in Belgrade, Serbia. He completed “Todor Dukin” Grammar School in Bečej and graduated from the Faculty of Law in Belgrade.

He speaks Russian and has a working knowledge of the English language. He is married with three children.

=== Professional career ===
In the period between 1979 and 1981, he worked in “Fadip” from Bečej as a clerk; from 1981 to 1990 he worked for “Hins” from Novi Sad, where he assumed the position of the director for legal affairs. In the period between 1990 and 2002 he worked in “Albus” JSC from Novi Sad, as the assistant managing director. From 2002 until 2008, he was employed at the Provincial Secretariat for Labour, Employment and Gender Equality, as the assistant to provincial secretary. He was the president of the steering committee of “Albus” JSC in the period from 1991 until 1995, the judge of the Court of Honour of the Chamber of Commerce of SFRY, a member of the Employment Council of the Republic of Serbia and a member of the Council for Protection at Work of the Republic of Serbia. He served two full terms as the president of the Social and Economic Council of the Government of Vojvodina and he was also a member of the Council for Refugees, Exiles and Displaced Persons. He is a member of the Headquarters for Emergency Situations.

He performed the duty of the president of the Committee on the Construction of the Educational Training Centre for Professional and Working Skills of the Government of Vojvodina. He led the expert team for drafting of the Programme for the Stimulation of Economy, Entrepreneurship and Craftsmanship of the Government of Vojvodina.

In the period from 2008 to 2012, he was in a position of the Provincial Secretary for Labour, Employment and Gender Equality. Since 2012 he has been in a position of the Provincial Secretary for Economy, Employment and Gender Equality.

== Awards ==
He received the Plaquette of Šid Municipality and the Plaquette of Beočin Municipality. He was designated an honorary citizen of Rivica and Višnjićevo. He received the international award of the European Association of Tourist Journalists for 2013, as well as the “Kapetan Miša Anastasijević” award for his contribution to development of entrepreneurship in Serbia. During his term of office, the Provincial Secretariat for Labour, Employment and Gender Equality received “Prvomajska” award of the Council of Autonomous Trade Unions of the City of Novi Sad and municipalities, while two projects, in the field of gender equality, were proclaimed as the best in the region by the United Nations and the European Commission. In the field of economy, the secretariat received international awards in the field of tourism and cluster organisation.

== Bibliography ==
He published several technical papers in the field of labour and employment, the most important of which are:

- „Social Dialogue –the EU Acquis without Alternative“
- „Impact on Privatisation Processes on the Issue of Unemployment“
- „Role of Regions and Local Communities in Employment“
- „Self-Employment as a Pillar of Employment“
- „Seven Chapters of the Programme for the Stimulation of Economy, Entrepreneurship and Craftsmanship of the AP Vojvodina “
