= Ivailo Petrov =

Bulgarian writer (1923–2005)

Ivailo Petrov (Bulgarian: Ивайло Петров; 19 January 1923, Bdintsi – 14 April 2005, Sofia) was a Bulgarian writer, who authored a number of short stories. His work focuses on traditional village life in Bulgaria.

His first major work was 1956's Nonka's Love about the transformation of rural life brought about by modernization and collectivization. His early works portrayed and idealized rural life common in many works of the era. His later works such as Before I was Born and Other Stories began to portray the more complex reality of the harshness and poverty of traditional rural life. With the fall of communism he published a set of works looking at the events of the 1940s and 1950s and the brutality of how the regime changed Bulgaria.

== Partial list of works ==
- Nonka's Love (1956)
- Before I was Born and Other Stories (1971)
