= Irina Skobtseva =

Soviet and Russian actress (1927–2020)

- Ирина Скобцева
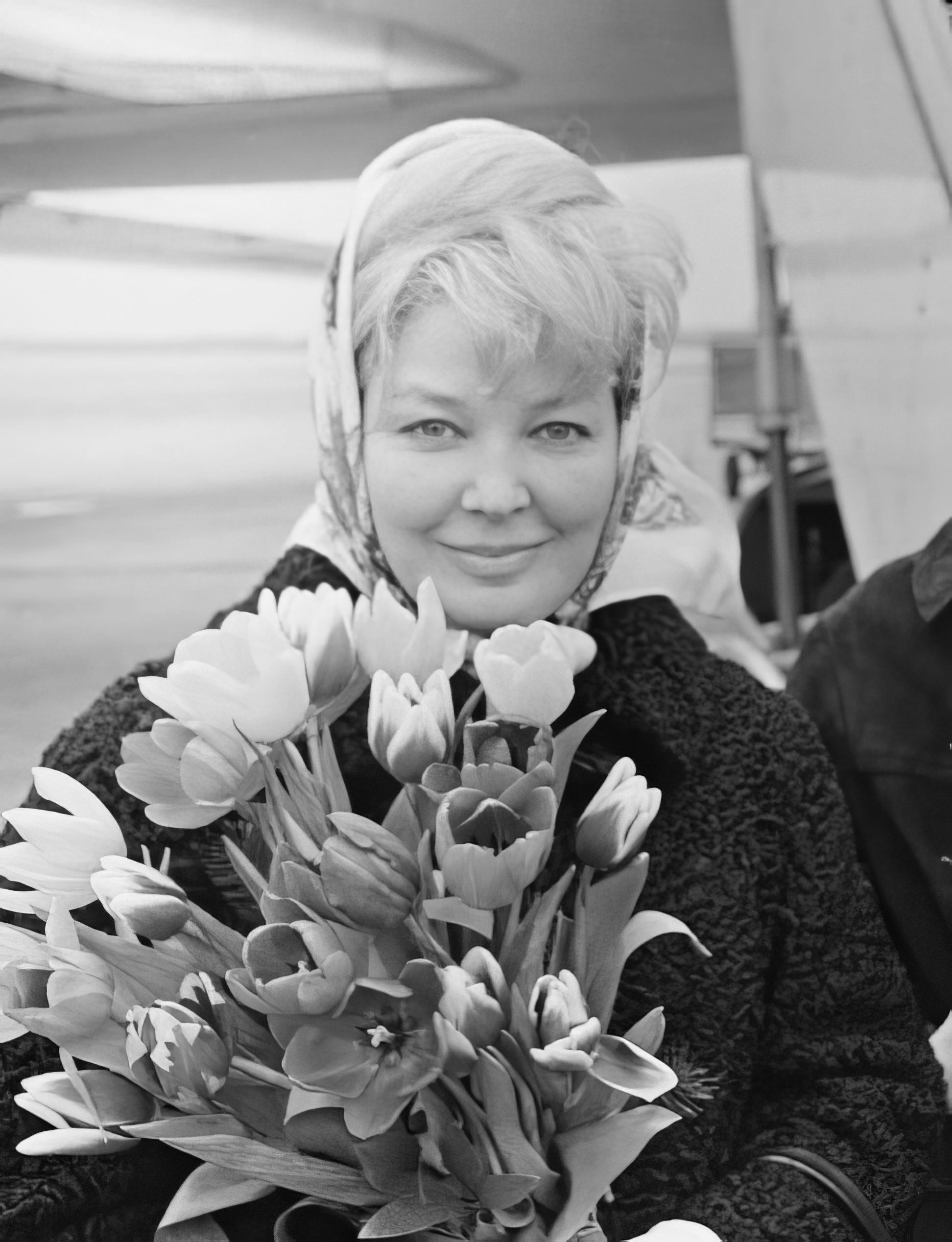
- Skobtseva in 1966
- Born: Irina Konstantinovna Skobtseva; 22 August 1927; Tula, Russian SFSR, Soviet Union
- Died: 20 October 2020 (aged 93); Moscow, Russia
- Occupation: Actress
- Years active: 1955–2016
- Spouse: Sergei Bondarchuk
- Children: Yelena Bondarchuk; Fyodor Bondarchuk

Irina Konstantinovna Skobtseva (Russian: Ирина Константиновна Скобцева; 22 August 1927 – 20 October 2020) was a Soviet and Russian actress and second wife of Sergei Bondarchuk.

== Biography ==
Irina Konstantinovna Skobtseva was born on 22 August 1927 in Tula. Her father was a research fellow at the Main Directorate of Meteorological Service, her mother worked in the archive.

After finishing secondary school, Skobtseva studied art at the Faculty of History of Moscow State University. While studying, she acted in student theatre.

After graduating from the Moscow State University in 1952, she entered the Moscow Art Theatre School, from which she graduated in 1955.

In the same year, Irina Skobtseva made her cinematic debut as Desdemona in the film Othello by Sergei Yutkevich. The picture won the Best Director Award at the 1956 Cannes Film Festival, and was given diplomas and prizes at other international film festivals. In Cannes Irina Skobtseva was awarded the title "Miss Charm of the Cannes Film Festival".

After Othello Irina Skobtseva, who remained in the audience's view primarily a romantic heroine, turned to character acting. She played Cyrus in the film adaptation of Leonid Leonov's play The Ordinary Man (1956) and Klavdia Nikolaevna in Unrepeatable Spring (1957).

Filming in Othello, where the partner of Skobtseva was actor and director Sergei Bondarchuk who in 1959 became her husband, laid the foundations for a number of their joint works in the cinema. The actress played both in the films produced by Bondarchuk himself, War and Peace (1965-1967), They Fought for Their Country (1975), The Steppe (1977), Boris Godunov (1986), and in films by other directors — Splendid Days (1960), Silence of Doctor Evans (1973), Take Aim (1975), Such High Mountains (1974), Velvet Season (1978), Father Sergius (1978), The Gadfly (1980).

Skobtseva also performed roles in Bondarchuk's Waterloo (1970), Red Bells II (1982) and Quiet Flows the Don (1992) - the last work of Sergei Bondarchuk.

In Georgiy Daneliya's films Walking the Streets of Moscow (1963), Thirty Three (1965) and Hopelessly Lost (1973), Skobtseva appeared as a comedic actress. One of her best comedy roles is Lidia Sergeevna in the Eldar Ryazanov film Zigzag of Success (1969).

The actress played the main roles in the films The Mysterious Heir (1987), The Ghosts of the Green Room (1991), and Zorka Venus (2000).

In 2000 Skobtseva starred in the series The Heirs (2001, 2005), Amber Wings (2003), Women's Logic (2004, 2005), Gold (2012). She performed roles in such films and series as Actress (2007), Dark Planet (2009), In the Style of Jazz (2010), The White Guard (2012), The Secret of the Dark Room (2014), and Dangerous Holidays (2016).

Since 1957, Skobtseva was an actress of the National Film Actors' Theatre.

Since 1971, she taught acting, was an assistant professor of the department of acting at VGIK and together with Bondarchuk led an acting studio. Among her students were Olga Kabo, Natalya Andrejchenko, Vladimir Basov, Jr., and Alexey Ivashchenko.

== Honors ==
Irina Skobtseva received the title People's Artist of the RSFSR in 1974. In 1997, she was awarded the Order of Friendship.

In 2017, the actress was awarded the Order of St. Sergius of Radonezh.

Irina Skobtseva was awarded the prize of the name Stanislav and Andrei Rostotsky for roles in the feature films Another Woman, Another Man (2003), Amber Wings (2003), a special jury prize for the cast in the film The Heirs (2001) Społokhi in Arkhangelsk.

== Personal life ==
Irina Skobtseva was married to actor and film director Sergei Bondarchuk. Their daughter, Yelena Bondarchuk was an actress of theater and cinema. Their son, Fyodor Bondarchuk is a film director, actor and producer, chairman of the board of directors of Lenfilm.

== Retirement and death ==
She semi-retired in the 1980s, but made some later appearances on television. She died in 2020. Her grandson, Konstantin Kryukov, was among those who attended the funeral.

== Selected filmography ==
- Othello (1955) as Desdemona
- A Unique Spring (1957) as Claudia Novozhilova
- Splendid Days (1960) as Marianna
- Walking the Streets of Moscow (1963) as Nadya
- Thirty Three (1965) as Vera Sergeyevna
- War and Peace (1966-1967) as Hélène Kuragin
- Zigzag of Success (1968) as Lidia Sergeevna, photographer
- Waterloo (1970) as Maria
- Hopelessly Lost (1973) as widow of Douglas
- Earthly Love (1974) as Elizaveta Polivanova
- Take Aim (1975) as Marina Kurchatova
- They Fought for Their Country (1975) as senior nurse
- Father Sergius (1978) as baroness
- The Gadfly (1980) as Gladys Burton
- Red Bells II (1983) as countess Panina
- Mary Poppins, Goodbye (1983) as miss Lark
- Time and the Conways (1984) as Magee
- Boris Godunov (1986) as the innkeeper
- The Envy of Gods (2000) as Sonia's mother
- Amber Wings (2003) as Yelizaveta Sergeyevna
- Heat (2006) as landlord
- Happy Together (2006, TV) as Laura Larionova's mother
- Actress (2007) as Varvara Fominichna
- In the Style of Jazz (2010) as former mother-in-law of Sergey Saveliev
- The White Guard (2012, TV) as Maria Nai-Turs

== Honors and awards ==
- Honored Artist of the RSFSR (1965)
- People's Artist of the RSFSR (1974)
- Order of Friendship (1997)
- Order of Honour (2018)
