= List of Soviet submissions for the Academy Award for Best Foreign Language Film =

List of films

Best International Feature Film submissions from the Soviet Union

Highlights
- Debut: 1963
- Submissions: 24
- Nominations: 9
- Oscar winners: 3
- Final submission: 1991

The Soviet Union submitted films for the American Academy Award for Best Foreign Language Film (Note: The category was renamed to the Academy Award for Best International Feature Film in April 2019, after the Academy deemed the word "Foreign" to be outdated.) between 1963 and 1991. The Foreign Language Film award is handed out annually by the U.S.-based Academy of Motion Picture Arts and Sciences to a feature-length motion picture produced outside the United States that contains primarily non-English dialogue. Each year, the Academy invites countries to submit their best films for competition, with only one film being accepted from each country.

The Soviet Union had a strong record in the category, receiving nine nominations between 1968–1984, including three wins: War and Peace (1967), Dersu Uzala (1975), and Moscow Does Not Believe in Tears (1980). Eight of the nominees, including all three winners, were produced by Russian film studios.

After 1992, the country was officially dissolved and succeeded by Russia, Armenia, Azerbaijan, Belarus, Estonia, Georgia, Kazakhstan, Kyrgyzstan, Latvia, Lithuania, Moldova, Tajikistan, Ukraine and Uzbekistan. Since then, the Russian Federation is the most successful country in the category, with seven nominations and one win for Burnt by the Sun.

== Submissions ==
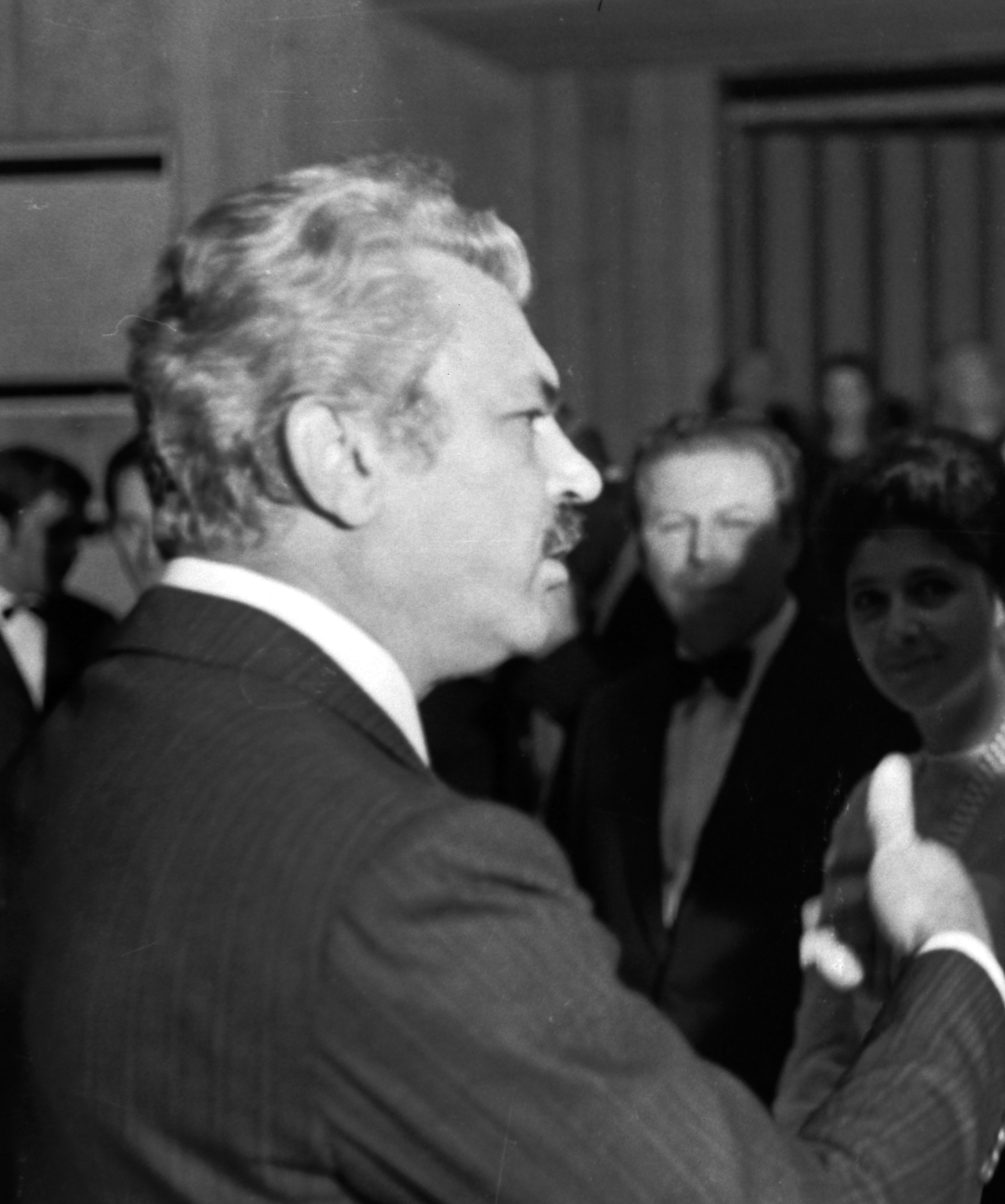
Sergei Bondarchuk was the first Soviet director to win the award, for War and Peace.

The Academy of Motion Picture Arts and Sciences has invited the film industries of various countries to submit their best film for the Academy Award for Best Foreign Language Film since 1956. The Foreign Language Film Award Committee oversees the process and reviews all the submitted films. Following this, they vote via secret ballot to determine the five nominees for the award.

Among the submissions were two films that sat on the shelf for several years awaiting approval from Soviet censors (1987–1988), a Japanese co-production (1975) and a documentary (1981). During the Soviet era, it was routine for productions to have cast and crew from throughout the country. However, each republic had its own film studios, and the "Republic of Production" indicates the republic of the film studio that produced the film. However, even outside of the Russian SFSR films were still produced in Russian, except for 1987 when the Soviet Union was nearing its collapse.

All the films submitted are primary in Russian, with the exception of Repentance (1987), which was in Georgian. Below is a list of the films that have been submitted by the Soviet Union for review by the academy for the award by year and the respective Academy Awards ceremony.

Year (Ceremony)	Film title used in nomination	Original title	Director(s)	Republic of production	Result
1963 (36th)	My Name is Ivan	Иваново детство	Andrei Tarkovsky	Russian SFSR	Not nominated
1968 (41st)	War and Peace	Война и мир	Sergei Bondarchuk	Russian SFSR	Won Academy Award
1969 (42nd)	The Brothers Karamazov	Братья Карамазовы	Kirill Lavrov, Ivan Pyryev and Mikhail Ulyanov	Russian SFSR	Nominated
1971 (44th)	Tchaikovsky	Чайкoвский	Igor Talankin	Russian SFSR	Nominated
1972 (45th)	The Dawns Here Are Quiet	А зори здесь тихие	Stanislav Rostotsky	Russian SFSR	Nominated
1973 (46th)	Liberation	Освобождение	Yuri Ozerov	Russian SFSR	Not nominated
1974 (47th)	The Ferocious One	Лютый	Tolomush Okeyev	Kazakh SSR; Kirghiz SSR	Not nominated
1975 (48th)	Dersu Uzala	Дерсу Узала	Akira Kurosawa	Russian SFSR	Won Academy Award
1976 (49th)	They Fought for Their Country	Они сражались за родину	Sergei Bondarchuk	Russian SFSR	Not nominated
1977 (50th)	The Ascent	Восхождение	Larisa Shepitko	Russian SFSR	Not nominated
1978 (51st)	White Bim Black Ear	Белый Бим Черное ухо	Stanislav Rostotsky	Russian SFSR	Nominated
1979 (52nd)	Autumn Marathon	Осенний марафон	Georgiy Daneliya	Russian SFSR	Not nominated
1980 (53rd)	Moscow Does Not Believe in Tears	Москва слезам не верит	Vladimir Menshov	Russian SFSR	Won Academy Award
1981 (54th)	O, Sport, You – the Peace!	О спорт, ты – мир!	Yuri Ozerov	Russian SFSR	Not nominated
1982 (55th)	Private Life	Частная жизнь	Yuli Raizman	Russian SFSR	Nominated
1983 (56th)	Vassa	Васса	Gleb Panfilov	Russian SFSR	Not nominated
1984 (57th)	Wartime Romance	Военно-полевой роман	Pyotr Todorovsky	Ukrainian SSR	Nominated
1985 (58th)	Come and See	Иди и смотри	Elem Klimov	Byelorussian SSR; Russian SFSR	Not nominated
1986 (59th)	Wild Pigeon	Чужая белая и рябой	Sergei Solovyov	Kazakh SSR; Russian SFSR	Not nominated
1987 (60th)	Repentance	მონანიება	Tengiz Abuladze	Georgian SSR	Not nominated
1988 (61st)	Commissar	Комиссар	Aleksandr Askoldov	Russian SFSR	Not nominated
1989 (62nd)	Zerograd	Город Зеро	Karen Shakhnazarov	Russian SFSR	Not nominated
1990 (63rd)	Taxi Blues	Такси-блюз	Pavel Lungin	Russian SFSR	Not nominated
1991 (64th)	Get Thee Out	Изыди!	Dmitriy Astrakhan	Russian SFSR	Not nominated

== See also ==
- Cinema of the Soviet Union
- Moscow Strikes Back, 1942 Soviet documentary film, one of four winners at the 15th Academy Awards for Best Documentary
- List of Academy Award winners and nominees for Best International Feature Film
- List of Russian submissions for the Academy Award for Best International Feature Film
- List of Armenian submissions for the Academy Award for Best International Feature Film
- List of Azerbaijani submissions for the Academy Award for Best International Feature Film
- List of Belarusian submissions for the Academy Award for Best International Feature Film
- List of Estonian submissions for the Academy Award for Best International Feature Film
- List of Georgian submissions for the Academy Award for Best International Feature Film
- List of Kazakhstani submissions for the Academy Award for Best International Feature Film
- List of Kyrgyzstani submissions for the Academy Award for Best International Feature Film
- List of Latvian submissions for the Academy Award for Best International Feature Film
- List of Lithuanian submissions for the Academy Award for Best International Feature Film
- List of Moldovan submissions for the Academy Award for Best International Feature Film
- List of Tajikistani submissions for the Academy Award for Best International Feature Film
- List of Ukrainian submissions for the Academy Award for Best International Feature Film
- List of Uzbekistani submissions for the Academy Award for Best International Feature Film
