= Vyacheslav Ovchinnikov =

Soviet Russian composer (1936–2019)

Vyacheslav A. Ovchinnikov
- Вячеслав А. Овчинников
- Born: May 29, 1936; Voronezh Oblast, Russian SFSR, Soviet Union
- Died: February 4, 2019 (aged 82); Moscow, Russia
- Education: Moscow Conservatory
- Occupations: Composer, Conductor
- Notable work: Elegy in Memory of Sergei Rachmaninov (2015)
- Board member of: Union of Friendship Societies with Foreign Countries; Days of Poets Celebration Committee
- Awards: To Fighter for Peace (1975); Order of the White Elephant (1992); People's Artist of the RSFSR (1986)

Vyacheslav Aleksandrovich Ovchinnikov (Russian: Вячесла́в Алекса́ндрович Овчи́нников; 29 May 1936 in Voronezh, Soviet Union – 4 February 2019 in Moscow, Russia) was a Soviet and Russian composer.

== Biography ==
He began composing at age 9 and entered the Moscow Conservatory at 15. Later he studied with Tikhon Khrennikov and Leo Ginzburg. He composed symphonies, symphonic poems, as well as works for chamber orchestra, small ensembles and solo instruments.

Outside his native country he is best known as a composer of music for such films as War and Peace, the 1966–67 film directed by Sergei Bondarchuk, Ivan's Childhood and Andrei Rublev for Andrei Tarkovsky. He has composed for some 40 films in total. Tarkovsky is said to have been so impressed by Ovchinnikov that he stated: "I cannot imagine a better composer for myself than Vyacheslav Ovchinnikov."

Ovchinnikov also had a successful career as a touring conductor from the 1970s. He has recorded for Melodiya, the Russian record company. His Symphony No. 2 was released on the Melodiya label.

Ovchinnikov was named a People's Artist of the RSFSR in 1986. For the 60th birthday (1992) of Queen Sirikit of Thailand, he was commissioned to compose The Bouquet for the Queen. For that work he was awarded the Order of the White Elephant. He was also a professor at the University of Kansas from 1990 to 1991.

== Compositions ==
=== Orchestral ===
- 1955-57: Symphony No. 1
- 1955-57: Six Symphonic Suites (for full orchestra)
- 1956: Symphony No. 2 (rev. 1972–73)
- 1964: Symphony No. 3
- 1986: Symphony No. 4 for Chorus and Orchestra
- 1991: Symphony No. 5

=== Opera ===
- 1974-78: On the Dawn of the Misty Youth

=== Ballet ===
- 1962: Sulamith
- 1988: Song of Songs
- Song of Spring Thaw
- Dedication (One act, collaboration with V.Kicta [?])

=== For piano ===
- Suite No. 1 (for piano)
- Suite No. 2 (for piano, four hands)

=== Choral music ===
- 2015: Elegy in Memory of Rachmaninoff, for Soprano, Chorus, and Orchestra (Written for the 100th Anniversary of Sergei Rachmaninoff Concert)
- There is Sky Lighted Edge, for a-capella Chorus (words by A. Block)
- Vocaliz, for a-capella Chorus
- Little Ballade, for a-capella Chorus (words by R. Burns)
- Singing for You, for a-capella Chorus
- Be Famed, Native Land, for Chorus and Orchestra (words by L.Vasilieva)
- Wind brought from Afar, for a-capella Chorus (words by A. Block)
- Autumnal, for Chorus (words by V.Firsov)

=== Cantata ===
- Song-Ballade about BAM Builders, for Orchestra, Symphony, and Bass soloist (words by L. Vasilieva)

=== Oratorio ===
- Seasons, for Orchestra, Symphony, and SATB soloists (folk lyrics arranged by V.Firsov)
- Sergei Radonezhsky, for Orchestra, Symphony, AB soloists (folk lyrics)

=== Accompaniment Music ===
- 1973: Scene of Action -- Russia (in collaboration with D.Gendelev)
- 2001 (play by S. MIkhailov, premiered at The A. Bryantsev Youth Theater)
- Full Turn Around (based on William Faulkner's analogous story, directed by A. Tarkovsky)

=== Arrangements ===
- Select Arrangements of Rachmaninoff's Choral Works

== Filmography ==
- The Steamroller and the Violin (1960)
- The Boy and the Dove (1961)
- Ivan's Childhood (1962)
- The First Teacher (1965)
- War and Peace (1966–1967)
- Andrei Rublev (1966)
- A Long Happy Life (1966)
- A Nest of Gentry (1969)
- A Soldier Came Back from the Front (1971)
- Arsenal (1972 restored version)
- That Sweet Word: Liberty! (1972)
- Earth (1972 restored version)
- Zvenigora (1973 restored version)
- They Fought for Their Country (1975)
- The Steppe (1977)
- Boris Godunov (1986)
