= Steppe (disambiguation) =

A steppe is an ecological zone consisting of plains generally lacking trees.

Steppe may also refer to:

== Places ==
- Eurasian Steppe, a vast ecoregion from Mongolia to Hungary
- Steppes, Tasmania, Australia

== Arts and entertainment ==
- The Steppes (band), an Irish American band
- The Steppe (1962 film), an Italian adventure film
- The Steppe (1977 film), a Soviet drama film
- The Steppe (novella), an 1888 work by Anton Chekhov
- "The Steppe", a smooth jazz instrumental by Jeff Lorber Fusion from Hacienda (2013)

== People with the surname ==
- Brook Steppe (born 1959), American former professional basketball player
- Harry Steppe (1888–1934), Jewish-American vaudeville actor

== See also ==
- The Jewish Steppe, a 2001 documentary about Soviet Jews
