= Boris Tchaikovsky =

Russian composer (1925–1996)

Boris Alexandrovich Tchaikovsky (Russian: Борис Александрович Чайковский; 10 September 1925 – 7 February 1996), PAU, was a Soviet and Russian composer, born in Moscow, whose oeuvre includes orchestral works, chamber music, and film music. He is considered as part of the second generation of Russian composers, following in the steps of Pyotr Ilyich Tchaikovsky (to whom he was not related) and especially Mussorgsky.

He was admired by Dmitri Shostakovich, with whom he studied, who (according to Per Skans in his notes for a recording) suggested in a letter of 1 February 1969 to Isaak Glikman, that "If Barshai's orchestra (the Moscow chamber orchestra) makes a guest appearance in Leningrad playing Vainberg's Tenth Symphony and Boris Tchaikovsky's Sinfonietta, you really have to hear them".

Of his larger-scale works almost all have been recorded. Boris Tchaikovsky generally wrote in a tonal style, although he made brief forays into serialism.

== Selected works ==
Stage

- The Star (Звезда), unfinished opera in three scenes (1949); libretto by David Samoilov after the novel by Emmanuil Kazakevich; Moscow Conservatory diploma-work

Orchestral

- Procession (Шествие) (1946)
- Symphony No.1 (1947)
- Fantasia on Russian Folk Themes (Фантазия на русские народные темы) (1950)
- Slavic Rhapsody (Славянская рапсодия) (1951)
- Symphonietta for string orchestra (1953)
- The Murmuring Forest Orchestral Suite (1953)
- Capriccio on English Themes (Каприччио на английские темы) (1954)
- Overture (Увертюра) (1957)
- Symphony No.2 (1967)
- Chamber Symphony (Камерная симфония) for chamber orchestra (1967)
- Theme and Eight Variations (Тема и восемь вариаций) (1973)
- Six Etudes (Шесть этюдов) for string orchestra and organ (1976)
- Symphony No.3 "Sevastopol" (Севастопольская симфония) (1980)
- The Winds of Siberia (Ветер Сибири), Symphonic Poem (1984)
- Four Preludes (Четыре прелюдии) for chamber orchestra (1984)
- The Juvenile (Подросток), Poem for orchestra (1984)
- Music for Orchestra (Музыка для оркестра) (1987)
- Symphony with Harp (Симфония с арфой) (1993)
- The Bells (Колокола), Prelude for orchestra (1996; completed in short score only)

Concertos

- Concerto for clarinet and chamber orchestra (1957)
- Concerto for cello and orchestra (1964)
- Concerto for violin and orchestra (1969)
- Concerto for piano and orchestra (1971)

Chamber music

- Piano Trio (1953)
- String Quartet No.1 (1954)
- String Trio (1955)
- Sonata for cello and piano (1957)
- Sonata for violin and piano (1959)
- Suite in D minor for cello solo (1960)
- String Quartet No.2 (1961)
- Piano Quintet (1962)
- Partita for cello and chamber ensemble (1966)
- String Quartet No.3 (1967)
- String Quartet No.4 (1972)
- String Quartet No.5 (1974)
- String Quartet No.6 (1976)
- Sextet for wind quintet and harp (1990)

Piano

- 3 Etudes (1935; 1972; 1980)
- 5 Pieces (1935)
- 5 Preludes (1936)
- 5 Pieces (1938)
- Sonata No.1 (1944)
- 2 Pieces (1945)
- Sonatina (1946)
- Sonata No.2 (1952)
- 8 Children's Pieces (Восемь детских пьес) (1952)
- Sonata for two pianos (1973)
- Pentatonic (Пентатоника), 6 Easy Pieces (1993)
- Natural Modes (Натуральные лады), 7 Miniatures (1993)

Vocal

- Two Poems by Mikhail Lermontov (Два стихотворения М. Ю. Лермонтова) for soprano and piano (1940)
- Four Poems by Josef Brodsky (Четыре стихотворения И. Бродского) for soprano and piano (1965)
- Lyrics of Pushkin (Лирика Пушкина), Song Cycle for soprano and piano (1972)
- Signs of the Zodiac (Знаки Зодиака), Cantata for soprano, harpsichord and string orchestra (1974)
- The Last Spring (Последняя весна), Song Cycle for mezzo-soprano, flute, clarinet and piano (1980); words by N. Zabolotsky
- From Kipling (Из Киплинга) for mezzo-soprano and viola (1994)

=== Film scores ===
Year	English title	Original title	Notes
1952		Опасный рельс	directed by Khanan Shmain
1956	Murder on Dante Street	Убийство на улице Данте	directed by Mikhail Romm
1957		Обыкновенный человек	directed by Alexander Stolbov
1958	October Days	В дни Октября	directed by Sergei Vasilyev
1958	Journey Beyond Three Seas	Pardesi; Хождение за три моря	directed by Khwaja Ahmad Abbas and Vasili Pronin
1959		Заре навстречу	directed by Tatyana Lukashevich
1959	Anyuta	Анюта	segment from Three Tales of Chekhov; directed by Meri Andzhaparidze
1960	Splendid Days	Серёжа	directed by Georgi Daneliya and Igor Talankin
1961		В пути	directed by Meri Andzhaparidze
1962	"The Tram to other Cities"	Трамвай в другие города	directed by Yuli Fait
1963	Summer Is Over	Пропало лето	directed by Rolan Bykov and Nikita Orlov
1963		Прочь с дороги!	directed by E. Shorokh
1963		Жертва	directed by Meri Andzhaparidze
1964	Balzaminov's Marriage	Женитьба Бальзаминова	directed by Konstantin Voynov
1964	The front is in defense	Пока фронт в обороне	directed by Yuli Fait
1965	"The Road to a Sea"	Дорога к морю	directed by Irina Poplavskaya
1966	A Boy and A Girl	Мальчик и девочка	directed by Yuli Fait
1966	Aybolit-66	Айболит-66	directed by Rolan Bykov
1967	Autumn Weddings	Осенние свадьбы	directed by Boris Yashin
1968		Первая девушка	directed by Boris Yashin
1969		Гори, гори моя звезда	directed by Alexander Mitta
1971		Нюркина жизнь	directed by Anatoli Bobrovsky
1974	Moscow, My Love	Москва, любовь моя	directed by Alexander Mitta and Kenji Yoshida (吉田憲二; Кэндзи Ёсида)
1974	Shower	Ливень	directed by Boris Yashin
1976		Собственное мнение	directed by Yuli Karasik
1976		Долги наши	directed by Boris Yashin
1978		Лоскутик и облако	animated film; directed by Rasa Strautmane
1978		Как тоску одолели	animated film; directed by Yuri Trofimov
1978		Расмус–бродяга	directed by Maria Muat
1978	A French Lessons	Уроки французского	directed by Yevgeny Tashkov
1979		Северная сказка	directed by Rasa Strautmane
1983		Подросток	TV mini-series; directed by Yevgeny Tashkov
1984		Зелёный остров	directed by Yuli Fait
1987		Ловкачи	directed by Yevgeny Tashkov

== Literature ==
- Grigor'yeva, Galina (2001). "Boris Aleksandrovich Chaykovsky". In Sadie, Stanley; Tyrrell, John (eds.). The New Grove Dictionary of Music and Musicians (2nd ed.). London: Macmillan Publishers. ISBN 978-1-56159-239-5.
- Schwarz, Boris. Music and musical life in Soviet Russia, 1917-1970. London : Barrie and Jenkins, 1972. "The Avant-Garde and the Middle Group."
