= Steppenwolf =

Steppenwolf may refer to:

== Biology ==
- Steppe wolf (Steppenwolf in German), a canine subspecies indigenous to Central Asia

== Arts and media ==
=== Music ===
- Steppenwolf (band), a Canadian-American rock band from the 1960s
- "Steppenwolf", a song by Hawkwind from Astounding Sounds, Amazing Music
- "He Was a Steppenwolf", a song by Boney M. from Nightflight to Venus

==== Albums ====
- Steppenwolf (Steppenwolf album), 1968
- Steppenwolf Live, 1970
- Steppenwolf (Peter Maffay album), 1979
- Steppenwolf (World Saxophone Quartet album), 2002

=== Other uses in arts and media ===
- Steppenwolf (novel), by Hermann Hesse, 1927
  - Steppenwolf (film), a 1974 adaptation of Hesse's novel
- Steppenwolf (character), a villain in the DC Comics Universe
- Steppenwolf Theatre Company, a theater company in Chicago, Illinois
- Steppenwolfs, a faction in the video game Crossout

== Other uses ==
- Audi Steppenwolf, an Audi concept car

== See also ==
- Steppe (disambiguation)
