= Amber Wings =

- Russian: Янтарные крылья
- Directed by: Andrey Razenkov
- Written by: Marina Mareyeva
- Produced by: Igor Bortnikov; Valeri Malkov; Ekaterina Maskina
- Starring: Alyona Bondarchuk; Aleksandr Baluev; Irina Skobtseva; Lembit Ulfsak; Arnis Licitis
- Cinematography: Masha Solovyova
- Edited by: Olga Grinshpun
- Music by: Michel Legrand
- Release date: 2003
- Country: Russia
- Language: Russian

Amber Wings (Russian: Янтарные крылья) is a 2003 Russian romantic drama film directed by Andrey Razenkov.

== Plot ==
The film tells about the relationship of a lawyer from Germany and a Russian actress who meet on Christmas evening in a small store in Tallinn.

== Cast ==
- Alyona Bondarchuk as Daughter
- Aleksandr Baluev as Lawyer Aleksandr
- Irina Skobtseva as Yelizaveta Sergeyevna
- Lembit Ulfsak as Robert
- Arnis Licitis
- Ita Ever as Marta
- Valdo Reitel
- Merle Palmiste as Juta
- Tim-Taniel Puting
- Elle Kull
