= Othello (1955 film) =

1955 film

Othello (Отелло)
- Film poster
- Directed by: Sergei Yutkevich
- Written by: Sergei Yutkevich
- Based on: Othello by William Shakespeare
- Starring: Sergei Bondarchuk; Andrei Popov; Irina Skobtseva; Vladimir Soshalsky; Yevgeny Vesnik
- Cinematography: Yevgeniy Nikolayevich Andrikanis
- Music by: Aram Khachaturian
- Release date: 1955
- Running time: 107 minutes
- Country: Soviet Union
- Language: Russian

Othello (Russian: Отелло, romanized: Otello) is a 1955 Soviet romantic drama film directed by Sergei Yutkevich, based on the play Othello by William Shakespeare. It was entered into the 1956 Cannes Film Festival, where Yutkevich received the Best Director Award.

== Plot ==
The film tells the tragic story of Othello, a fearless Moor and general of the Venetian Republic, portrayed by Sergey Bondarchuk. He captivates Desdemona (Irina Skobtseva), the beautiful daughter of Brabantio (Yevgeny Teterin), with tales of his extraordinary life. Swayed by his courage and intellect, Desdemona falls in love with him, and they marry in secret. However, the union is met with outrage when the envious Venetian nobleman Rodrigo (Yevgeny Vesnik) and the spiteful ensign Iago (Andrey Popov) inform Brabantio of the marriage. Desdemona openly declares her love for Othello, defying her father's disapproval before the Doge of Venice.

As a Turkish fleet threatens Venice, Othello is sent to Cyprus, where he achieves a decisive victory. Iago, driven by ambition and hatred, begins a campaign of deceit to discredit Othello's trusted lieutenant, Cassio (Vladimir Soshalsky), and take his place. Manipulating events, Iago orchestrates Cassio's disgrace and gains Othello's trust by feigning loyalty. Iago's cunning extends to exploiting Desdemona's kindness as she advocates for Cassio's reinstatement, planting seeds of jealousy and mistrust in Othello's mind. Using a handkerchief—Desdemona's misplaced token of affection—as fabricated evidence, Iago fuels Othello's growing suspicion.

In a tragic culmination, Othello, consumed by jealousy, strangles Desdemona. Emilia (Antonina Maksimova), Iago's wife, reveals her husband's treachery, prompting Iago to murder her in a fit of rage. As the truth comes to light, Othello, overwhelmed with grief and remorse, takes his own life. The film concludes with a somber image: a funeral ship bearing the bodies of Othello and Desdemona sails into the sunset, while the disgraced and shackled Iago faces justice.

== Cast ==
- Sergei Bondarchuk as Othello
- Andrei Popov as Iago
- Irina Skobtseva as Desdemona
- Vladimir Soshalsky as Cassio
- Yevgeny Vesnik as Roderigo
- Antonina Maksimova as Emilia
- Yevgeny Teterin as Brabantio
- Mikhail Troyanovsky as Duke of Venice
- Aleksei Kelberer as Montano
- Nikolai Briling as Lodovico
- Leila Ashrafova as Bianca
