= Boris Godunov (1986 film) =

1986 film by Sergei Bondarchuk

- Film poster
- Directed by: Sergei Bondarchuk
- Written by: Sergei Bondarchuk; Alexander Pushkin
- Starring: Sergei Bondarchuk; Alyona Bondarchuk
- Cinematography: Vadim Yusov
- Edited by: Lyudmila Sviridenko
- Music by: Vyacheslav Ovchinnikov
- Production companies: Mosfilm; Allianz Filmproduktion; Barrandov Studios; Zepoli Filmove
- Distributed by: Mosfilm
- Release dates: 18 May 1986 (Cannes); 31 October 1986 (Soviet Union)
- Running time: 141 minutes
- Countries: Soviet Union; Poland; Czechoslovakia; West Germany
- Languages: Russian; French

Boris Godunov (Russian: Борис Годунов) is a 1986 historical drama film directed by and starring Sergei Bondarchuk. An adaptation of Alexander Pushkin's 1825 play of the same name, the film is an international co-production by the Soviet Union, Poland, Czechoslovakia, and West Germany. It was entered into the 1986 Cannes Film Festival.

== Plot ==
The action takes place in Russia and Poland as the 16th century ends and the 17th century begins. The reign of Boris Godunov is depicted, his son Feodor, and the coming to power of False Dmitry I. After the death of the feeble-minded Tsar Fedor Ivanovich, son of Ivan the Terrible, Boris Godunov takes the throne, by the decision of the Zemsky Sobor, with the help of intrigues, alliances and the arrangement of his sister Irina's marriage to Tsarevich Feodor, gains great influence and power in the court.

But suddenly there is a new contender for the throne – a man posing as Dmitri, the younger son of Ivan the Terrible, who officially died in Uglich in 1591. The pretender shows up in Poland and after he receives the support of Prince Vishnevetzky, Sandomierz voivode Mniszech and his daughter, the beautiful Marina, returns to Russia. Despite the fact that the church and Vasily Shuiski, who investigated the circumstances of the death of Dmitry, deny the authenticity of the prince, he on his way to Moscow. He is becoming increasingly popular among the people and is setting up to be a real threat to Tsar Boris. Who is he really – a daring adventurer, a true prince, or a ghost who has materialized to avenge a long-forgotten crime?

== Cast ==
- Sergei Bondarchuk as Boris Godunov
- Alyona Bondarchuk as tsarevna Xenia Godunova
- Gennady Mitrofanov as fool for Christ
- Roman Filippov as Patriarch Job of Moscow
- Valery Storozhik as prince Dmitry Kurbsky
- Yuri Lazarev as Gavrila Pushkin
- Vladimir Sedov as Afanasy Pushkin
- Georgi Burkov as Barlaam
- Vadim Aleksandrov as Misael
- Irina Skobtseva as tavern hostess
- Kira Golovko as nurse of Xenia
- Lyudmila Korshakova as tsaritsa Maria Skuratova-Belskaya
- Fyodor Bondarchuk as tsarevitch Theodore Godunov
- Henryk Machalica as Jerzy Mniszech
- Olgierd Łukaszewicz as Mikołaj Czernikowski
- Marian Dziędziel as Adam Wiśniowiecki
- Vladimir Novikov as Semyon Godunov
- Valeriy Sheptekita as Father Superior of Chudov Monastery
- Nonna Terentyeva as Irina
