= Zigzag of Success =

- Directed by: Eldar Ryazanov
- Written by: Eldar Ryazanov; Emil Braginsky
- Starring: Yevgeny Leonov; Irina Skobtseva; Valentina Talyzina; Yevgeniy Yevstigneyev
- Narrated by: Zinovy Gerdt
- Cinematography: Vladimir Nakhabtsev
- Edited by: Yekaterina Ovsyannikova
- Music by: Andrey Petrov
- Production company: Mosfilm
- Release date: 30 December 1968
- Running time: 88 minutes
- Country: Soviet Union
- Language: Russian

Zigzag of Success (Russian: Зигзаг удачи, translit. Zigzag udachi) is a 1968 Soviet comedy film directed by Eldar Ryazanov.

The film tells the story of how in a small-town photo studio, a young photographer's scheme to win big in the lottery sparks chaos, love, and comedic twists, as he navigates ambition, relationships, and the unpredictable fortunes of life.

== Plot ==
The film begins with a short animated sequence about the history of photography and the significance of photographers as professionals. The story then shifts to a provincial town in the 1960s, focusing on the employees of a local photo studio named "Sovremennik." The studio is struggling to meet its operational goals, prompting a resourceful young photographer, Vladimir Oreshnikov, to propose an idea: taking self-portraits to boost productivity. The idea is met with enthusiasm, and the staff appoints Oreshnikov as the head of their mutual-aid fund. Oreshnikov, who dreams of becoming a photo artist and acquiring a prestigious “Zenit-6” camera, decides to take advantage of his new position. He borrows the fund's entire 20 rubles, leaving a written note as a guarantee, and uses the money to buy a government bond through his fiancée, Olya, a cashier at the local savings bank. His plan is to test his luck and possibly win a large sum.

Parallel storylines weave through the narrative. Lidiya Sergeyevna, one of Oreshnikov's colleagues, faces domestic strife as her jealous husband grows frustrated with her late work hours, eventually leaving her and taking all their furniture. Another subplot involves the unattractive head of the studio's union committee, Alevtina Vasilyevna, who dreams of marriage. Her mother arranges a match with Ivan Stepanovich Kalachyov, a middle-aged and well-off, yet crude and simple man. Alevtina is unimpressed, and her father, a retired military officer, throws Ivan out during the matchmaking process. Ivan later realizes Alevtina is his best option and visits her at work under the pretense of needing a photo, but their awkward interaction does not lead to romance.

The story reaches its climax when Oreshnikov’s bond wins a massive 10,000 rubles in the lottery. His elation causes tension with Olya, leading to their breakup. Meanwhile, Lidiya Sergeyevna invites him to celebrate, falsely claiming she has evicted her husband. Unbeknownst to Oreshnikov, he ends up at her house with her estranged spouse, resulting in a heated confrontation that eventually turns into reconciliation. However, Oreshnikov’s newfound arrogance alienates his colleagues, who accuse him of using communal funds for personal gain. At a studio meeting, Ivan Stepanovich attempts to defend Oreshnikov but ultimately sides with the majority. Stripped of his role and the bond, Oreshnikov is left humiliated. Lidiya Sergeyevna, who has developed feelings for him, confesses her love but is gently rejected. She seduces him nonetheless, complicating matters further.

As the New Year approaches, Oreshnikov and Lidiya Sergeyevna plot a comedic revenge against their colleagues, disguised as Santa Claus and a skier. They steal the money but eventually return it, keeping only their rightful shares. Oreshnikov uses his portion to buy Olya a fur coat as a peace offering, though their future remains uncertain. Alevtina marries Ivan Stepanovich, though her expensive tastes unsettle her new husband. Meanwhile, Oreshnikov’s optimism endures as he invests in another lottery bond, hoping luck will again make a zigzag in his favor. The film concludes with the quirky and resilient employees of the photo studio looking forward to new beginnings.

== Cast ==
- Yevgeny Leonov as Vladimir Oreshnikov, photographer
- Irina Skobtseva as Lidia Sergeevna, photographer
- Valentina Talyzina as Alevtina Vasil'evna, receptionist in photo studio, the chairman of the trade union committee of photo studio
- Yevgeniy Yevstigneyev as Ivan Kalachev, director of carpool, Alevtina's bridegroom
- Alexey Gribov as Kirill Polotencev, director of photo studio
- Gotlib Roninson as radiologist, Lidia Sergeevna's husband
- Georgi Burkov as Peter, photographer-retoucher, alcoholic
- Valentina Telichkina as Olya, Oreshnikov's bride, cashier in bank
- Boris Suslov as Yura, photographer
- Svetlana Starikova as Irina, Yura's wife
- Antonina Dmitrieva as leading lottery
- Nina Sazonova as Maria Petrovna, Alevtina's mother
- Victor Shulgin as Alevtina's father
- Felix Javorski as chairman of the lottery commission
- Vladimir Gulyaev as policeman on lottery
- Ekaterina Savinova as oranges saleswoman
