= Splendid Days =

- Directed by: Georgiy Daneliya; Igor Talankin
- Written by: Georgiy Daneliya; Igor Talankin; Vera Panova
- Starring: Borya Barkhatov; Sergei Bondarchuk; Irina Skobtseva
- Cinematography: Anatoli Nitochkin
- Edited by: P. Chechyotkina
- Music by: Boris Tchaikovsky
- Production company: Mosfilm
- Release date: 1960
- Running time: 80 min.
- Country: Soviet Union
- Language: Russian

Splendid Days (Russian: Серёжа, romanized: Seryozha) is a 1960 Soviet comedy-drama film directed by Georgiy Daneliya and Igor Talankin.

== Plot ==
Mother of five-year-old Seryozha has married for a second time and now Dmitri Korneyevich Korostelyov is officially his father. The boy calls Dmitri by his last name - Korostelyov, since Seryozha's stepfather also became the boy's best friend who helps solve small, but very important problems. Seryozha feels that the adult man perceives him as an independent person, can communicate with him as with a peer, respects his thoughts and acts. Korostelyov makes the boy's greatest dream come true - he buys him a bicycle. When the family begins expecting a new addition to the family - Korostelyov with Seryozha consults and discusses plans for the future.

Newly born little brother Lyonya diverts all of mother's attention and worries towards himself, and Seryozha begins to feel lonely and abandoned. In addition, his parents who are moving to another city where his father has found a new place of work, are going to leave Seryozha with a neighbor because of the boy's ill throat. But all of a sudden everything is happily resolved on the day of departure ...

== Cast ==
- Boris Barkhatov as Sergei
- Sergei Bondarchuk as Dmitri Korneyevich Korostelyov, Sergei's stepfather
- Irina Skobtseva as Marianna, Sergei's mother
- Seryozha Metelitsyn as Vaska
- Yura Kozlov as Zhenya
- Lyubov Sokolova as Polina, Vaska's mother
- Vasili Merkuryev as Uncle Kostya, the captain of the deep voyage
- Aleksandra Panova as Aunt Pasha
- Nikolai Sergeyev as Lukyanych the accountant
- Clarina Frolova-Vorontsova as Aunt Zhenya
- Alyosha Dotsenko as Shurik
- Natasha Chechetkina as Lidka
- Valentin Bryleev as petitioner
- Vyacheslav Brovkin as Uncle Petya
- Pavel Vinnik as toy seller
- Margarita Zharova as Nadia Ivanova, a milkmaid
- Pyotr Kiryutkin as a collective farmer in the club
- Yevgeny Kudryashov as Alexei, projectionist

== Production ==
The script was personally written by Igor Talankin, and Georgiy Danelia made a storyboard for him; he drew 505 frames of the future film. Before the beginning of the work, the directors agreed that everything is to be done together, each one has an opportunity to veto on any decision, but only every other day.

Initially, another actor was invited for the role of Korostelyov. However, the artistic council of the association did not approve this and recommended Sergei Bondarchuk to them. The young directors did not believe that Bondarchuk would agree to act in a directorial debut. But after reading the script, Sergei said that he liked the role.

The beginning of the shooting was scheduled for September 1959. Since the action of the picture takes place in the summer, it was decided to build the set in Krasnodar, where autumn has a large number of sunny days.

== Awards ==
- The best film of 1960 according to the survey of the magazine Soviet Screen
- Grand Prix – Karlovy Vary International Film Festival 1960
