= Elle Kull =

Estonian actress and politician

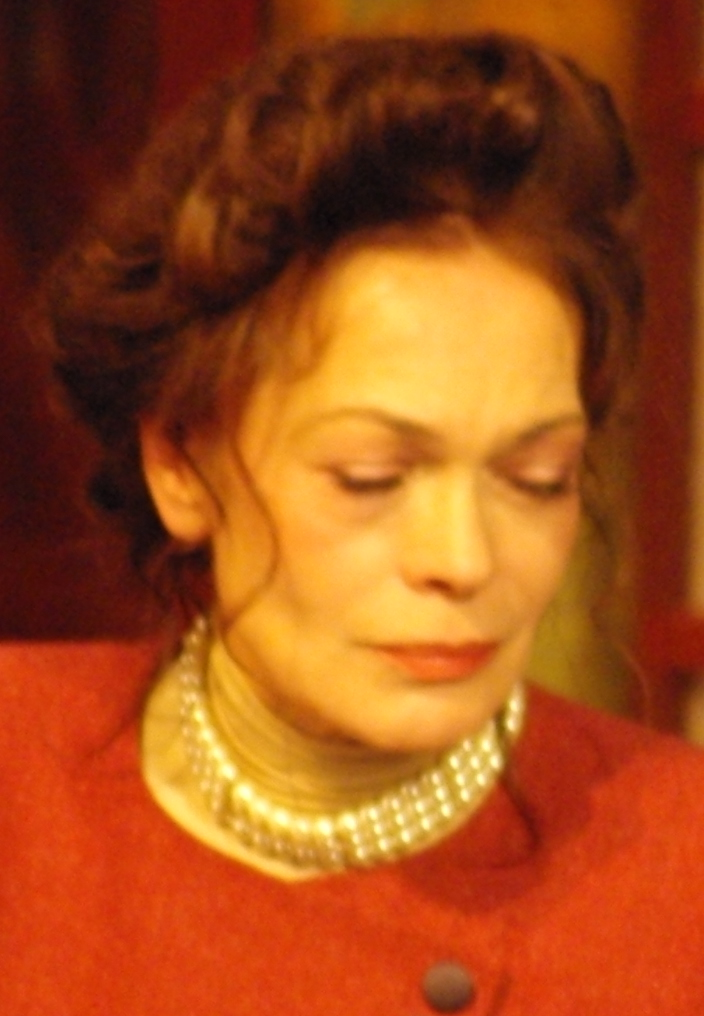
- Kull in 2009
- Born: 5 January 1952 (age 74); Haapsalu, then part of Estonian SSR, Soviet Union
- Education: Tallinn State Conservatory
- Occupations: Actress, politician
- Years active: 1973–present
- Spouse: Ago-Endrik Kerge (m. 1980; died 2021)

Member of the Riigikogu
- In office 2003–2007

Elle Kull (born 5 January 1952) is an Estonian stage, television, and film actress, as well as a politician and humanitarian. She is widely regarded as one of Estonia's most prominent screen icons, known for her leading roles in classic Estonian films and her decades-long career at the Estonian Drama Theatre.

== Early life and education ==
Kull was born on 5 January 1952 in Haapsalu, Estonia. where she grew up and attended school. Her father orked as the head of a regional planning department, and her mother was employed in a local construction office. She attended Haapsalu Secondary School No. 1, graduating in 1970. Following her secondary education, Kull moved to Tallinn to pursue professional acting training at the Performing Arts Department of the Tallinn State Conservatory (now the Estonian Academy of Music and Theatre), completing her studies and graduating in 1974.

== Career ==
=== Theater ===
Upon graduating in 1974, Kull joined the troupe of the Estonian Drama Theatre.

=== Film and television ===
Kull achieved widespread recognition while still being a student when she starred as "Minna" in Leida Laius's 1973 drama film "Ukuaru"

== Political and public activity ==
Kull was a member of the Res Publica Party and was elected to the tenth legislature of the Estonian Parliament (Riigikogu), serving from 2003 to 2007. During her time in office, she actively focused on family welfare policies, notably advocating for the expansion of large family benefits. In 2005, she was voted the year's most child-friendly public figure at the "101 Children to Toompea" youth forum.

Outside of the parliament, Kull was heavily involved with humanitarian work. She served as the long-time president of the Estonian National Committee for UNICEF, working alongside government officials to establish child, and youth-friendly community initiatives across Estonian cities.

== Selected filmography ==
- Äratus (1989)
- Amber Wings (2003)
- Jade Warrior (2006)
- Georg (2007)
- Letters to Angel (2011)
