= Take Aim =

Take Aim may refer to:

- Take Aim (film), a 1974 two-part Soviet biographical drama film
- Take Aim (album), a 1980 album by Harold Land
