= Take Aim (film) =

- Russian poster
- Directed by: Igor Talankin
- Written by: Solomon Shulman; Daniil Granin; Igor Talankin
- Starring: Sergei Bondarchuk; Georgiy Zhzhonov; Sergei Yursky
- Music by: Alfred Schnittke
- Production company: Mosfilm
- Release date: 1 March 1974
- Running time: 158 minutes
- Country: Soviet Union
- Language: Russian

Take Aim (Russian: Выбор цели, romanized: Vybor Tzeli) is a 1974 two-part Soviet biographical drama film directed and co-written by Igor Talankin.

== Plot ==
The film depicts the nuclear arms race that developed among the major powers during World War II, ultimately setting the stage for the Cold War. The story begins with the 1945 Meeting at the Elbe between American and Soviet forces and the subsequent Potsdam Conference, where Harry S. Truman reveals that the U.S. now possesses a powerful new weapon and will not concede in the postwar division of Europe.

The first part of the film focuses on the war years, covering the Manhattan Project and the American effort to outpace the Germans in developing atomic weapons, while Joseph Stalin decides the Soviet Union must initiate its own atomic program. Allied forces interrogate German scientists in Operation Epsilon to assess Nazi progress on nuclear technology, with physicist Otto Hahn burdened by guilt over the bombings of Hiroshima and Nagasaki, feeling responsible as a key figure in nuclear research.

The film then revisits the early 1940s, when Franklin D. Roosevelt authorizes the Manhattan Project following Albert Einstein’s warning. Meanwhile, Adolf Hitler underestimates atomic weapons’ significance, halting Nazi nuclear efforts. In 1942, Stalin assembles Soviet scientists at his Kuntsevo Dacha, inspired by a letter from Junior Lieutenant Georgy Flyorov suggesting that the Allies are advancing nuclear research. Igor Kurchatov is selected to lead the Soviet effort, initiating the USSR’s atomic project amid wartime deprivation.

In the second part, the film shifts to the Soviet post-war nuclear program, as scientists progress from experiments to testing their first atomic bomb at the Semipalatinsk Test Site. The film also portrays the ethical struggles faced by scientists like J. Robert Oppenheimer, who is torn over his role in developing the bomb, and Kurchatov, who later advocates for peaceful nuclear initiatives and the future potential of controlled nuclear fusion. Throughout, the film addresses the profound personal dilemmas confronting the scientists who helped shape the nuclear age.

== Production ==
The film was produced solely by Mosfilm, without a direct participation of DEFA, and yet several East German actors were invited to play the German historical figures. Fritz Diez, who appeared as Hitler on screen for the sixth time in his career, was also given the role of Otto Hahn.

The producers faced a technical difficulty in a scene which contained a nuclear explosion. After several experiments, the special effects coordinator, Samir Jaber - a Syrian citizen who worked for Mosfilm - decided to create the required sequence by trickling a drop of orange-tinted perfume into a watery solution of aniline and filming it close up.

== Reception ==
The film won the 1975 Kishinev All-Union Film Festival Grand Prize. Talankin received the Silver Pyramide in the 1977 Cairo International Film Festival.

== Cast ==
- Sergei Bondarchuk – Igor Kurchatov
- Georgiy Zhzhonov – Vitaly Petrovich Zubavin
- Nikolai Volkov – Abram Ioffe
- Irina Skobtseva – Marina Dmitriyevna Kurchatova
- Nikolai Burlyayev – Fedya
- Alla Pokrovskaya – Tanya
- Yakov Tripolsky – Joseph Stalin
- Mikhail Ulyanov – Georgy Zhukov
- Nikolai Zasukhin – Vyacheslav Molotov
- Sergei Yursky – J. Robert Oppenheimer
- Erich Gerberding – Leslie Groves
- Oleg Basilashvili – Boris Pash
- Alla Demidova – Jane
- Innokenty Smoktunovsky – Franklin D. Roosevelt
- Jerzy Kaliszewski – Harry S. Truman
- Horst Schulze – Werner Heisenberg
- Miloš Nedbal – Max von Laue
- Fritz Diez – Otto Hahn/Adolf Hitler
- Siegfried Weiß – Niels Bohr
- Mark Prudkin – Albert Einstein
- Boris Ivanov – Leó Szilárd
- Nikolai Lebedev – energy minister
- Sergei Kurilov – Vladimir Vernadsky
