= War and Peace (film series) =

1967 film by Sergei Bondarchuk

- Original theatrical release poster for Part I: Andrei Bolkonsky
- Directed by: Sergei Bondarchuk
- Screenplay by: Sergei Bondarchuk; Vasily Solovyov
- Based on: War and Peace by Leo Tolstoy
- Produced by: Viktor Tsirgiladze; Nikolai Ivanov; G. Meyerovich; V. Krivonoschenko
- Starring: Sergei Bondarchuk; Ludmila Savelyeva; Vyacheslav Tikhonov
- Cinematography: Anatoly Petritsky; Yu-Lan Chen; Alexander Shelenkov
- Edited by: Tatiana Likhacheva
- Music by: Vyacheslav Ovchinnikov
- Distributed by: Mosfilm
- Release dates: July 1965 (4th Moscow International Film Festival); 14 March 1966 (Part I); 20 July 1966 (Part II); 21 July 1967 (Part III); 4 November 1967 (Part IV)
- Running time: Part I: 147 minutes; Part II: 100 minutes; Part III: 84 minutes; Part IV: 100 minutes; Total: 431 minutes
- Country: Soviet Union
- Languages: Russian; French; German
- Budget: 8,291,712 Rbls; (US$9.2 million)
- Box office: 58,000,000 Rbls (USSR estimate)

War and Peace (Russian: Война и мир, romanized: Voyna i mir) is a 1965–1967 Soviet epic war drama film co-written and directed by Sergei Bondarchuk, adapted from Leo Tolstoy's 1869 novel. Released in four installments throughout 1965 and 1967, the film starred Bondarchuk in the leading role of Pierre Bezukhov, alongside Vyacheslav Tikhonov and Ludmila Savelyeva, who depicted Prince Andrei Bolkonsky and Natasha Rostova.

The film was produced by the Mosfilm studios between 1961 and 1967, with considerable support from the Soviet authorities and the Soviet Army which provided hundreds of horses and over ten thousand soldiers as extras. At a cost of 8.29 million Rbls (equal to US$9.21 million at 1967 rates, or $60–70 million in 2019, accounting for rouble inflation) it was the most expensive film made in the Soviet Union.

Upon its release, it became a success with audiences, selling approximately 135 million tickets in the USSR. War and Peace also won the Grand Prix in the Moscow International Film Festival, the Golden Globe Award for Best Foreign Language Film and the Academy Award for Best Foreign Language Film. Since its release, the film has often been considered the grandest epic film ever made, with many asserting its monumental production to be unrepeatable and unique in film history.

== Plot ==
=== Part I: Andrei Bolkonsky (Война и мир: Андрей Болконский) ===
In Saint Petersburg of 1805, Pierre Bezukhov, the illegitimate son of a rich nobleman, is introduced to high society. His friend, Prince Andrei Bolkonsky, joins the Imperial Russian Army as aide-de-camp of General Mikhail Kutuzov in the War of the Third Coalition against Napoleon. As Pierre's father recognizes him, Pierre attracts the attention of Hélène Kuragina and marries her, only to learn through rumor that she has been unfaithful and slept with Fyodor Dolokhov, an intimate of Hélène's brother Anatole. Meanwhile, Andrei takes part in the failed campaign in Austria, where he witnesses the Battle of Schöngrabern and the Battle of Austerlitz, is badly wounded and mistaken for dead. He returns to his father's estate just in time to witness his wife Lisa die during childbirth.

=== Part II: Natasha Rostova (Война и мир: Наташа Ростова) ===
In the end of 1809, Natasha, the young daughter of a count attends her first ball at age 16. Andrei Bolkonsky falls in love with her and intends to marry her, but his father demands they wait. Andrei travels abroad, and Natasha desperately longs for him. But she then meets the handsome Anatole Kuragin who falls in love with her and follows her with much passion. Overwhelmed Natasha decides she prefers him over Andrei. At the last minute, she regrets her choice and abandons her plans to elope with Anatole. However, Andrei has heard of her plans and declares their betrothal is over. Natasha suffers a nervous breakdown. Pierre, trying to calm her down, suddenly announces he loves her.

=== Part III: The Year 1812 (Война и мир: 1812 год) ===
In 1812, Napoleon's Army invades Russia. Field Marshal Kutuzov is appointed by the Tsar to defend the land. Kutuzov asks Andrei to join him as a staff officer, but he requests a command in the field. Pierre approaches the battlefield of the upcoming confrontation between the armies during the Battle of Borodino, he volunteers to assist in an artillery battery. Andrei's unit waits in the reserve, but he is hit by a shell and both he and Anatole suffer severe wounds. The battle involves hundreds of thousands of soldiers, thousands of horses, and hundreds of cannons firing from both sides. The French army forces the Russian army to retreat, leaving Moscow unprotected. Napoleon advances on Moscow.

=== Part IV: Pierre Bezukhov (Война и мир: Пьер Безухов) ===
As Moscow is set ablaze by the retreating Russians, the Rostovs flee their estate, taking wounded soldiers with them, and unbeknownst to them, also Andrei. Pierre, dressed as a peasant, tries to assassinate Napoleon but is taken prisoner. As the French are forced to retreat, he is marched for months with the Grande Armée, until being freed by partisans. The French army is defeated by Field Marshal Kutuzov in the Battle of Krasnoi. Andrei is recognized and is brought to his estate. He forgives Natasha on his deathbed. She reunites with Pierre as Moscow is being rebuilt.

== Cast ==
- Sergei Bondarchuk as Pierre Bezukhov
- Ludmila Savelyeva as Natasha Rostova
- Vyacheslav Tikhonov as Andrei Bolkonsky
- Boris Zakhava as Mikhail Kutuzov
- Anatoly Ktorov as Nikolai Bolkonsky
- Antonina Shuranova as Maria Bolkonskaya
- Oleg Tabakov as Nikolai Rostov
- Viktor Stanitsyn as Ilya Rostov
- Kira Golovko as Natalya Rostova
- Irina Skobtseva as Hélène Kuragina
- Vasily Lanovoy as Anatole Kuragin
- Irina Gubanova as Sonya Rostova
- Oleg Yefremov as Fyodor Dolokhov
- Eduard Martsevich as Boris Drubetskoy
- Aleksandr Borisov as Uncle Rostov
- Nikolai Rybnikov as Vasily Denisov
- Viktor Murganov as Alexander I of Russia
- Larisa Borisenko as Mlle. Bourienne
- Georgy Millyar as Morel
- Nonna Mordyukova as Anisya
- Anna Timiryova as old lady
- Boris Khmelnitsky as Bolkonsky's adjutant
- Valeri Yeremichev as Alexander Ostermann-Tolstoy
- Boris Smirnov as Vasili Kuragin
- Nikolai Tolkachyov as Kirill Bezukhov
- Dzhemma Firsova as Katishe Mamontova
- Mikhail Khrabrov as Platon Karataev
- Nikolay Trofimov as Tushin
- Vladislav Strzhelchik as Napoleon
- Jānis Grantiņš as Ludwig von Wolzogen
- Dz. Eizentāls as Carl von Clausewitz
- Galina Kravchenko as Marya Karagina
- Boris Molchanov as Louis-Nicolas Davout
- Lev Polyakov as Jacques Lauriston
- Rodion Aleksandrov as Alexander Balashov
- Anastasiya Vertinskaya as Lisa Bolkonskaya
- Giuli Chokhonelidze as Pyotr Bagration
- Vadim Safronov as Francis II
- Jean-Claude Ballard as Ramballe
- Yelena Tyapkina as Marya Dmitryevna
- Sergei Yermilov as Petya Rostov
- Nikita Mikhalkov as Petya Rostov's body double during hunting (uncredited)
- Herberts Zommers as Count Benningsen
- Nikolai Bubnov as Karl Mack von Leiberich
- Angelina Stepanova as Anna Scherer
- Erwin Knausmüller as Franz von Weyrother
- Mikhail Pogorzhelsky as Michael Andreas Barclay de Tolly
- Leonid Vidavsky as Paisi Kaysarov
- Nikolai Grinko as Dessalles

== Production ==
=== Inception ===
In August 1959, King Vidor's American-Italian co-production War and Peace was released in the Soviet Union, attracting 31.4 million viewers and gaining wide acclaim. The impending 150th anniversary of the 1812 French Invasion, as well as the worldwide success of Vidor's adaptation of the Russian national epic – at a time when the USSR and the United States were competing for prestige – motivated the Soviet Minister of Culture Yekaterina Furtseva to begin planning a local picture based on Leo Tolstoy's novel. An open letter which appeared in the Soviet press, signed by many of the country's filmmakers, declared: "It is a matter of honor for the Soviet cinema industry, to produce a picture which will surpass the American-Italian one in its artistic merit and authenticity." According to Der Spiegel, the film was to serve as a "counterstrike" to Vidor.

During 1960, several leading Soviet directors proposed themselves to head the project, including Mikhail Romm and Sergei Gerasimov. But soon, the only viable candidate remaining was Ivan Pyryev. As his selection to the position seemed secure, several officials in the Ministry of Culture offered it to forty-year-old Sergei Bondarchuk, who had completed his directorial debut, Fate of a Man, in 1959. Bondarchuk had not sought the position and did not know of the proposal until a letter from the Ministry reached him, but he chose to accept it and contend with Pyryev.

Fedor Razzakov wrote that the invitation of Bondarchuk was orchestrated by Pyryev's many enemies in the establishment, who were determined not to let him receive the lucrative project. In early February 1961, a letter endorsing Bondarchuk was sent to the Minister, signed by several prominent figures from the cinema industry. At first, Furtseva decreed that both candidates would each direct a pilot to be screened before a commission. However, Pyryev soon withdrew his bid. Razzakov believed he had done so after realizing his chances were slim: Bondarchuk, whose career began only during the Thaw, represented a generation of young directors promoted by Nikita Khrushchev's Kremlin to replace the old filmmakers from the Stalin era. In the end of February, after Pyryev conceded, the Minister held a meeting and confirmed Bondarchuk as the director.

=== Development ===
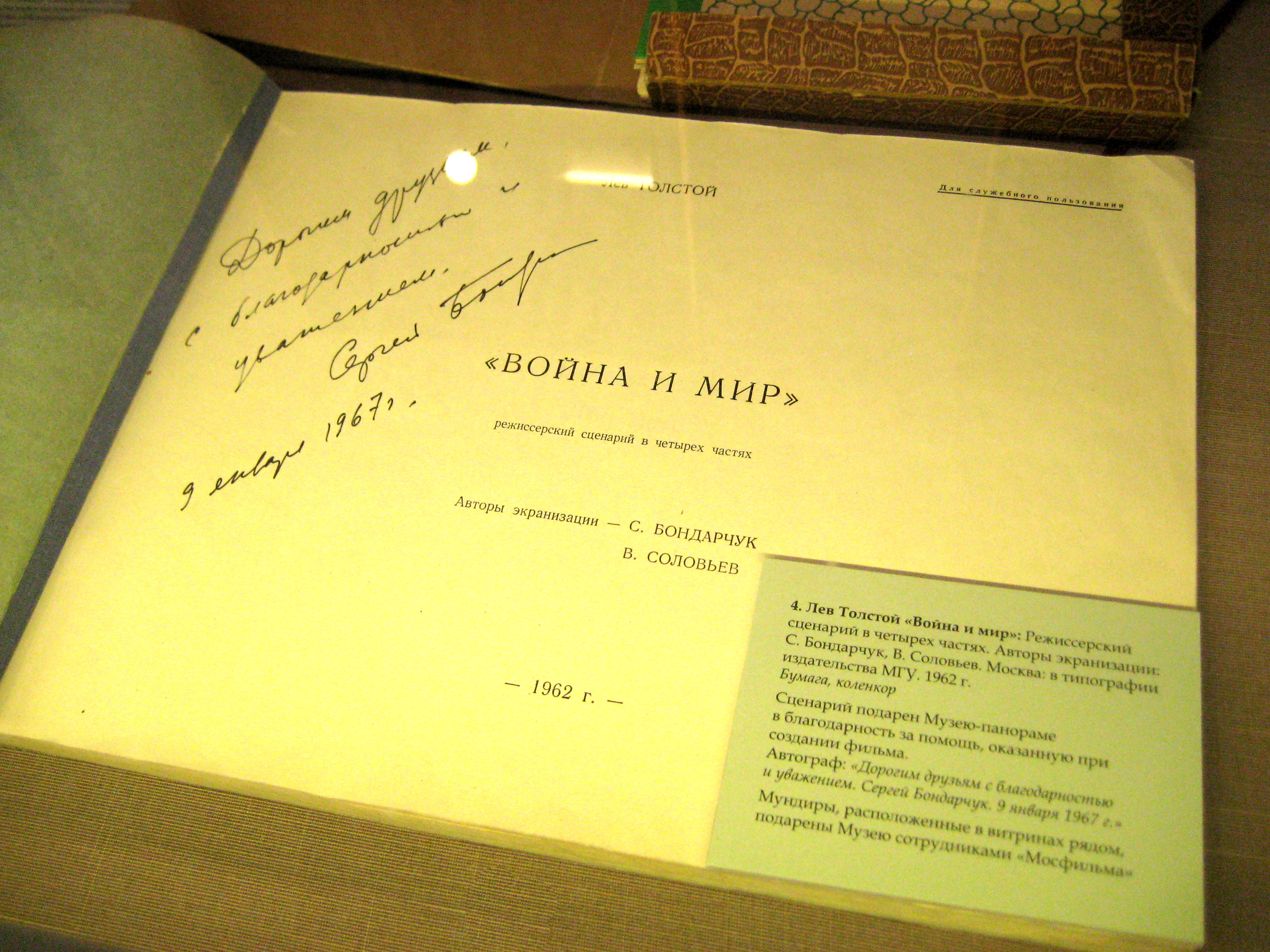
The director's screenplay of War and Peace

On 3 April 1961, Vladimir Surin, the director-general of the Mosfilm studios, sent Furtseva a letter requesting to approve the adaptation of a script for a film in three parts based on War and Peace, as well as to allocate 150,000 Rbls in funds. On 5 May the Minister replied, authorizing to begin writing the scenario and granting 30,000 Rbls. On that day, the work on the picture began.

Bondarchuk hired Vasily Solovyov, a playwright, as his assistant for composing the script. The two later changed the earlier premise and decided to make four parts instead of three. They chose to downplay or exclude completely several of Tolstoy's plotlines and themes, in order not to make the film too cumbersome: the episodes concerning Nikolai Rostov and Maria Bolkonskaya were reduced, and Anatole Kuragin received a slightly better treatment. The author's views on philosophy and history were substantially redacted.

The Mosfilm directorate approved the finished script on 27 February 1962. On 20 March, in a plenum in the Ministry of Culture attended by Surin and the State Committee for Cinematography's deputy chairman Basakov, Furtseva approved the scenario and requested all relevant agencies to assist the producers, including the Ministry of Defense, which was deemed central in providing support for the project.

The producers appointed three military advisers: Army General Vladimir Kurasov became the film's chief consultant, and Army General Markian Popov also assisted; Lieutenant General Nikolai Oslikovsky was brought in as an expert on cavalry. The Soviet Army would supply thousands of soldiers as extras during the filming.

More than forty museums contributed historical artifacts, such as chandeliers, furniture and cutlery, to create an authentic impression of early 19th-century Russia. Thousands of costumes were sewn, mainly military uniforms of the sorts worn in the Napoleonic Wars, including 11,000 shakos. Sixty obsolete cannons were cast and 120 wagons and carts constructed for the production.

Anticipating the need for cavalry, line producer Nikolai Ivanov and General Osilkovsky began seeking appropriate horses. While the cavalry formations of the Army were long abolished, several units in the Transcaucasian Military District and the Turkestan Military District retained horse-drawn mountain artillery. In addition to those, the Ministry of Agriculture donated nine hundred horses and the Moscow City Police provided a detachment from its mounted regiment. The producers also needed to arrange hounds for the wolf hunting at the Rostov estate. At first, it was planned to use borzois, as depicted in the novel. Sixteen borzois were obtained from individual private owners, but the dogs had no experience in hunting and were hard to handle. Eventually, scent hounds supplied by the Ministry of Defense chased down the wolves—provided by the zoological department of the State Studio for Popular Science Films—while the borzois caught them.

=== Casting ===
Bondarchuk began holding auditions in May 1961. Oleg Strizhenov received the leading role of Prince Andrei Bolkonsky. However, in spring 1962, shortly before the commencing of principal photography, Strizhenov changed his mind after being accepted into the ensemble of the Moscow Art Theatre. Bondarchuk complained to the Ministry of Culture. Furtseva spoke with the actor, but failed to convince him. The director then tried to enlist Innokenty Smoktunovsky, who was supposed to star in Grigori Kozintsev's Hamlet. After deliberations, Smoktunovsky accepted Bondarchuk's offer, but Kozintsev used his influence in the Ministry and received his actor back. As a last resort, Vyacheslav Tikhonov was given the role. He first arrived on the set in mid-December 1962, three months after filming began.

Bondarchuk envisaged the character of Pierre Bezukhov as having great physical strength, in accordance with his description by Tolstoy. Therefore, he had offered the role to Olympic weightlifter Yury Vlasov, and even rehearsed with him. Vlasov soon gave it up, telling the director that he had no acting skills. Bondarchuk then cast himself as the protagonist. His wife, actress Irina Skobtseva, portrayed Hélène Kuragina, Pierre's first wife. During the making of the third and fourth parts in the series, a journalist named Yury Devochkin, who resembled the director, substituted for him in many of the scenes.

Anastasiya Vertinskaya, Lyudmila Gurchenko and other known actresses wanted to portray Natasha Rostova, but Bondarchuk chose the inexperienced 19-year-old ballerina Ludmila Savelyeva, who had just recently graduated from Vaganova Academy of Russian Ballet. Nikita Mikhalkov was cast as Natasha's little brother, Petya Rostov; however, as he was in the age of adolescence and quickly growing up, he had to abandon the role in favor of the younger Sergei Yermilov. Still, Mikhalkov's scenes of riding a horse during hunting were left in the final film.

Tikhonov was the highest-paid member of the cast, and received R22,228 for portraying Bolkonsky. Bondarchuk earned R21,679 for directing and 20,100 for depicting Pierre. Savelyeva got R10,685. Most other actors received less than R3,000.

=== Cinematography ===
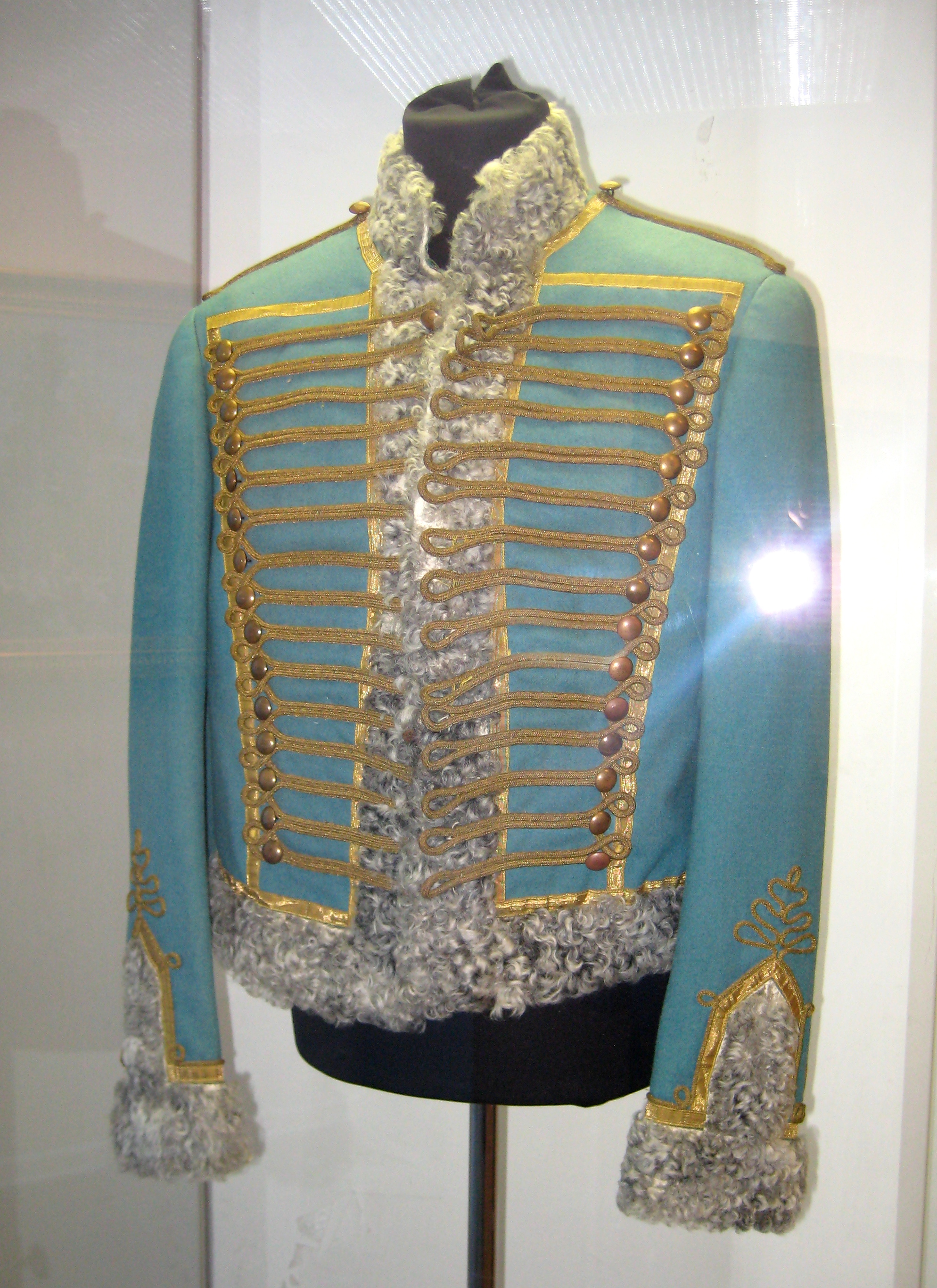
The hussar officer's pelisse worn by actor Nikolai Rybnikov, who portrayed Denisov

Before beginning principal photography, the producers resolved to shoot the picture with 70-mm wide-format and high-resolution film instead of the standard 35-mm. Although they considered purchasing it from Kodak or from ORWO in the German Democratic Republic, they eventually decided to use Soviet-made film stock manufactured in the Shostka Chemical Plant, both because of financial shortage and for considerations of national pride. Director of photography Anatoly Petritsky recalled that the Shostka film was "of horrible quality" and that he often would photograph a sequence only to discover that the film was defective. This, as well as the need to cover large crowds from many angles, forced the director to repeat many of the scenes; some of the more elaborate battle sequences were retaken more than forty times. According to Kommersant journalist Yevgeni Zhirnov, Bondarchuk had to re-shoot more than 10% of the footage in the picture due to problems with the film stock; Zhirnov estimated that this raised the cost of production by 10% to 15% or more.

The first cinematographers, husband and wife Alexander Shelenkov and Yu-Lan Chen, quarreled with Bondarchuk on several occasions. On 20 May 1963, half a year after commencing photography, they wrote to Surin, asking to be dismissed from work on the picture and stating that Bondarchuk "dictated without consulting with the crew". Their 31-year-old assistant Petritsky, who had made only one film previously, was appointed in their stead.

The operators pioneered photographic techniques which had never been used before in Soviet cinema. Aerial lifts with cameras were hoisted over sets to create a "cannonball view". When filming Natasha's first ball, an operator with a hand-held camera circled between the dancing extras on roller skates. The crowd scenes were shot using cranes and helicopters. Another new feature was the sound technicians' use of a six-channel audio recording system.

=== Principal photography ===
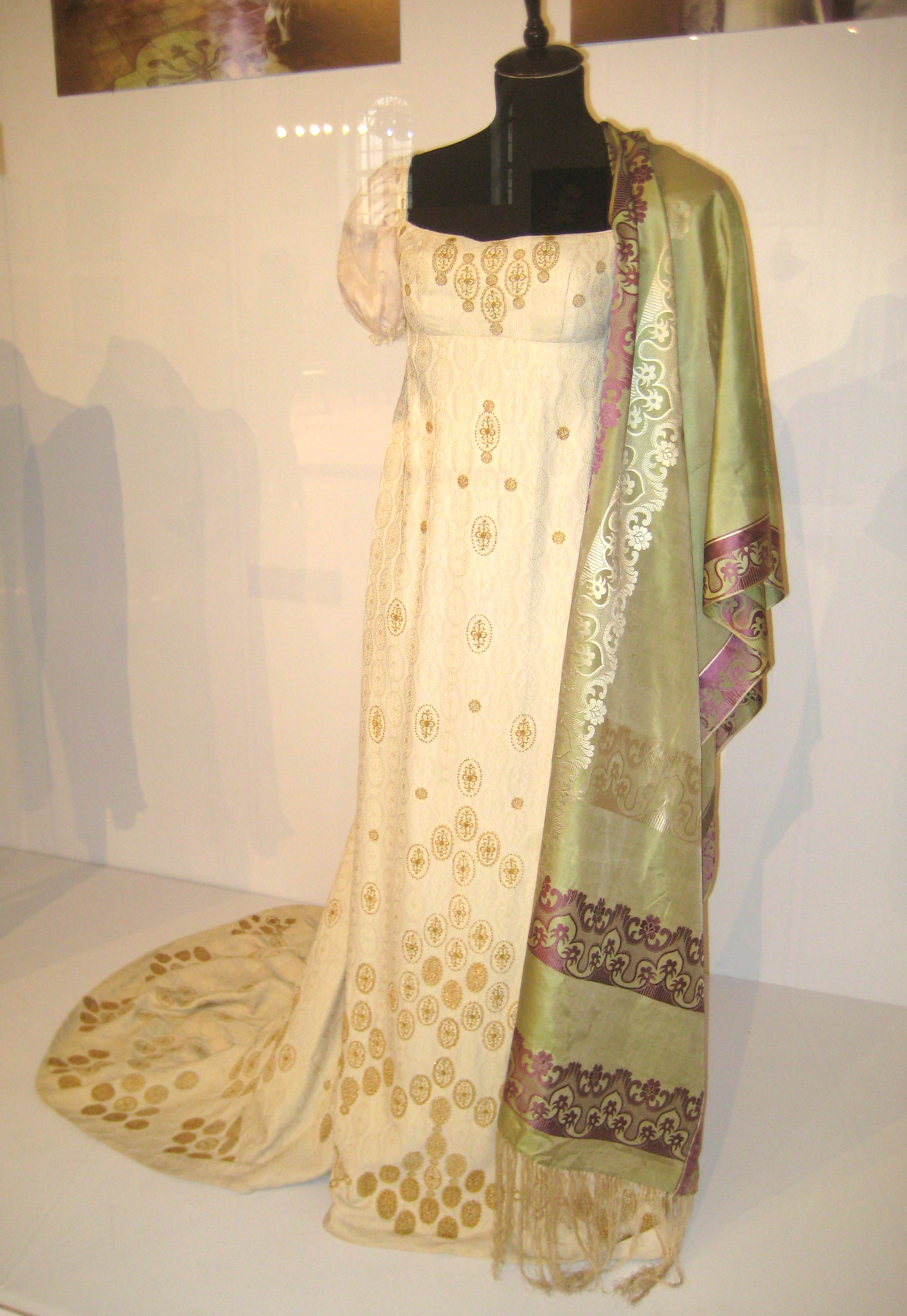
A costume used during the filming

On 7 September 1962, the 150th anniversary of the Battle of Borodino, principal photography began. The first scene to be filmed depicted the execution of suspected arsonists by the French army, and was shot in the Novodevichy Convent. After a few days, the crew moved into the Moscow Kremlin for further work. Later that month, the hunt in the Rostov's estate was filmed in the village of Bogoslavskoye, in the Yasnogorsky District.

On 1 December, Bondarchuk and the production team, with 150 wagons of equipment, traveled to Mukachevo in the Zakarpattia Oblast. The director had only planned to photograph two episodes there: the Battle of Schöngrabern and the Battle of Austerlitz. But due to the harsh winter, none of those could be shot. Bondarchuk revised his plans and decided to film in Zakarpattia 231 scenes that he had planned to make elsewhere, while waiting for the weather to improve. The Battle of Krasnoi episode and its related parts were filmed in the snow, and involved 2,500 Soviet soldiers, allocated as extras, who wore French uniforms and 500 in Russian uniforms. When conditions enabled it, 3,000 soldiers from the Carpathian Military District re-created the Battle of Schöngrabern near the village of Kushtanovytsia. The Battle of Austerlitz was filmed in the vicinity of Svaliava. As the budget had been exceeded due to the weather and film stock problems, Bondarchuk had to refrain from filming several battle sequences. On 17 May, the crew returned to the capital.

On 20 July, the producers went on another expedition, to Dorogobuzh, in order to film the Battle of Borodino and the related parts of the plot. Photography could not be carried out in Borodino itself, mainly because of the many memorials located there. On 1 August, work was commenced. The shooting of the battle itself began on 25 August 1963—its 151st anniversary by the Julian Calendar. 13,500 soldiers and 1,500 horsemen substituted for the historical armies (Several reports in the Western press have put the number of soldiers who participated at 120,000; (Note: The 1979 Guinness Book of World Records and other sources state that "the re-creation of the Battle of Borodino involved 120,000 Soviet Army extras". This figure is contradicted by several contemporary sources: the New York Times journalist Theodore Shabad reported that "12,000 soldiers and 800 horses" took part. Chief military consultant Vladimir Kurasov wrote that "12–13 thousand soldiers" would be used for Borodino. Nikolai Ivanov recalled a "force of 15,000". Even the 1971 Guinness Book of World Records states: "The re-creation of the Battle of Borodino involved 12,000 men and 800 horses." The figure used here is cited by Razzakov, who had access to the production records.) however, in a 1986 interview to National Geographic, Bondarchuk stated: "That is exaggeration, all I had was 12,000.") The troops were supposed to return to their bases after thirteen days, but eventually remained for three months. 23 tons of gunpowder, handled by 120 sappers, and 40,000 liters of kerosene were used for the pyrotechnics, as well as 10,000 smoke grenades. Tens of thousands of cubic meters of soil were dug out to construct earthworks resembling the Bagration flèches and the Raevsky redoubt. The set was divided to sectors, and a system of loudspeakers was installed—one for each area—to enable the director to coordinate the troops' movements. On 4 November, the session ended and Bondarchuk went back to Moscow.

From the end of December to mid-June 1964, the crew worked in Mosfilm's studios. Most notably, Natasha's debutante ball was photographed there, with five hundred extras. On 15 June, the production team went to Leningrad, where shooting took place in the Hermitage Museum, the Summer Garden, the Peter and Paul Fortress and in Vasilyevsky Island. Upon his return to the studio on 7 July, Bondarchuk was abruptly instructed by his superiors to abandon all other work and focus on preparing the first two parts for the 1965 Moscow Film Festival, contrary to all former designs and while they were far from finished. During the same month, he suffered a major cardiac arrest and was clinically dead for a short while. His first words after regaining consciousness were: "If I die, let Gerasimov finish it". Filming was postponed until late September.

In spite of the tight schedule, the parts Andrei Bolkonsky and Natasha Rostova were completed and were submitted to Mosfilm's directorate on 30 June 1965, less than a week before the festival. The two parts had their world premiere on 19 July 1965, in the Kremlin Palace of Congresses. During July, Bondarchuk suffered another heart attack: this time, he was clinically dead for four minutes. The white wall of light seen by Bolkonsky before his death was inspired by the director's experience.

The work on the remaining episodes of parts 3 and 4 resumed on 9 August. During the next months, the crew filmed in Mozhaysk, Kalinin and Zvenigorod. The final plot line to be shot was the Fire of Moscow; filming began on 17 October 1966. For four months prior to that, a plywood set was built in the village of Teryayevo, next to the Joseph-Volokolamsk Monastery. The entire construction, doused with diesel fuel, was burned to the ground as five fire engines stood nearby. Principal photography ended on 28 October 1966. On 28 December, the edited third part was approved by the studio. Work on the fourth and final part continued until early August 1967.

=== Budget ===
In 1962, officials in the Ministry of Culture estimated War and Peace would cost some 4 million roubles, not including support from the Army. In comparison, the most expensive Soviet film until then, the 1952 The Unforgettable Year 1919, cost 1.093 million Rbls in prices adjusted to the 1961 monetary reform. War and Peace remains the costliest picture made in the USSR.

On 20 March 1962, Furtseva set a preliminary budget of 1.395 million Rbls. On 21 May 1963, the Ministry approved a plan for a series in four parts with a budget of 8,165,200 Rbls. On 25 August 1964, the State Committee for Cinematography issued a directive revisiting the terms, authorizing to spend 8.5 million Rbls, of which 2.51 million Rbls were to cover the expenses of the Ministry of Defense. Producer Nikolai Ivanov recalled: "the domestic press later claimed the budget was 18 million Rbls or 25 million Rbls, but they had 8.5 million and managed to reduce expenditures to 7.8 million during principal photography."

Towards the end of post-production, the total cost forecast estimated was 8,083,412 Rbls. However, in August 1967, with all work completed, "the last debit and credit entries were written in the books. According to its financial statements, the film consumed 8,291,712 Rbls." This was equal to US$9,213,013 by the 1967 exchange rate, (Note: The exchange rate of the rouble to US dollar from 1961 to 1971 was 0.9:1. Other exchange rates used here are the 1969 rate of £0.41667:$1 and the 1967 rate of DM 3.9866:$1.) or to approximately $60–70 million in 2021, accounting for rouble inflation.

Various estimates of the series' budget circulated in the international press. The New York Times reported that it was "the most expensive film ever made... Russians say cost $100 million". This figure was repeated throughout the American press. The New York Times estimated this figure to be equivalent to $700 million upon adjustment for inflation to 2007 levels, a claim it reiterated in 2019. After its release in the United Kingdom in 1969, The Annual Register announced it "reputedly" cost £40 million ($96 million). The 1979 Guinness Book of World Records published a similar figure, claiming that War and Peace was "the most expensive film ever made" based on that "the total cost has been officially stated to be more than $96 million". Other estimates put the cost of production between $25 million and $60 million. (Note: In March 1965, the British magazine Films and Filming reported that the two first parts required £9 million (equal to $25.2 million); in July, L'Express stated that they cost $50 million. René Drommert of Die Zeit was told that 135 million West German Marks ($33.8 million) were spent making them, while Der Spiegel stated that it cost 240 million West German Mark ($60.2 million).)

== Reception ==
=== Distribution ===
The distribution (along with the display and later preservation) of such a massive piece of work posed physical difficulties. The 20 canisters of film reels already made its transportation challenging.

Andrei Bolkonsky was screened in two consecutive parts, released in a total of 2,805 copies in March 1966. In the fifteen months afterwards, the first part sold 58.3 million tickets in the USSR, and 58 million of the viewers remained through the intermission. Thus, Bolkonsky became the most successful film of the year. Respectively, its two parts are also the 26th and 27th most watched from among all pictures ever made in the Soviet Union. Natasha Rostova, which opened in July with 1,405 copies disseminated, performed less well and attracted 36.2 million viewers in the same time period, reaching the third place in the 1966 box office, although it would have been ninth if counted in 1967. Admission for the two final parts declined further: 1812, with 1,407 copies released, had 21 million admissions and Pierre Bezukhov sold only 19.8 million tickets; they made it to the 13th and 14th place at the 1967 box office.

Russian film critic Sergei Kudryavtsev assessed that the series' domestic returns were "probably in the range" of 58 million Rbls (equivalent to $64,000,000), while Razzakov assumed that each ticket cost an average price of 25 kopecks. With a total of some 135 million tickets sold, War and Peace was considered a resounding commercial success at the time.

The series was screened in 117 countries around the world, including Spain, Japan, West Germany, Denmark, Belgium, Egypt, and Argentina. In East Germany, the state-owned DEFA studio produced a slightly shorter edition of the series, dubbed into German, which ran for 409 minutes and maintained the four-part arrangement of the original. It featured among others Angelica Domröse, who voiced Lisa Bolkonskaya, and attracted 2,225,649 viewers. In West Germany, a much shorter version was released, totaling 337 minutes. In Poland, it sold over 5,000,000 tickets in 1967. In France, War and Peace had 1,236,327 admissions.

Walter Reade Jr.'s company Continental Distributors purchased the U.S. rights of War and Peace for $1.5 million. Reade's associates shortened the American version of the film by an hour, and added English-language dubbing. This edition was directed by Lee Kresel of Titan Productions and narrated by Norman Rose. Its premiere was held in the DeMille Theater, New York, on 28 April 1968, and attended by actresses Ludmila Savelyeva and Irina Skobtseva, as well as Soviet ambassadors Anatoly Dobrynin and Yakov Malik. Tickets for the picture were later sold for $5.50–$7.50—the highest admission rate ever, breaking the previous $6 record of Funny Girl. On 23 January 1969, Kresel's edition opened in London's Curzon cinema.

The US television network ABC broadcast War and Peace over four days, 12–15 August 1972. The series was broadcast on BBC2 on Christmas Day 1976, split into two 4-hour sections with a 30-minute intermission.

=== Awards ===
In July 1965, War and Peace was awarded the Grand Prix at the 4th Moscow International Film Festival together with the Hungarian entry Twenty Hours. Ludmila Savelyeva was presented with an honorary diploma. The readers of Sovetskii Ekran, the official publication of the State Committee for Cinematography, chose Savelyeva and Vyacheslav Tikhonov for the best actress and actor of 1966, in recognition of their appearance in the picture. In the same year, War and Peace also received the Million Pearl Award of the Roei Association of Film Viewers in Japan.

In 1967, the film was entered into the 1967 Cannes Film Festival, out of competition. It was sent there instead of Andrei Tarkovsky's Andrei Rublev, which had been invited by the festival's organizers but was deemed inappropriate by the Soviet government.

In the United States, it won the Golden Globe Award for Best Foreign Language Film in the 26th Golden Globe Awards. The picture was the Soviet entry to the 41st Academy Awards, held on 14 April 1969. It received the Academy Award for Best Foreign Language Film and was nominated for Best Art Direction.

War and Peace was the first Soviet picture to win the Academy Award for Best Foreign Language Film, and was the longest film ever to receive an Academy Award until O.J.: Made in America won the Academy Award for Best Documentary Feature in 2017.

To this day, War and Peace is one of only four Russian films to have ever won the Academy Award for Best Foreign Language Film. The other three are Dersu Uzala (1975), Moscow Does Not Believe in Tears (1980) and Burnt by the Sun (1994).

It also won the National Board of Review Award for Best Foreign Language Film and the New York Film Critics Circle Award for Best Foreign Language Film for 1968.

In 1970, it was nominated for the BAFTA Award for Best Production Design in the 23rd British Academy Film Awards.

=== Critical response ===
Soviet film critic Rostislav Yurenev wrote that War and Peace was "the most ambitious and monumental adaptation of the greatest work of Russian literature […] set out to convey in tremendous scope the historical conception of Leo Tolstoy, his extraordinarily vivid and profound depiction of humanity". In a second review, he added: "the desire for ever greater depth of penetration into the human character, of every aspect of it […] led to Sergei Bondarchuk's adaptation of Tolstoy. The outcome is truly marvelous."

Frankfurter Allgemeine Zeitung reviewer Brigitte Jeremias stated the film presented history "with great meticulousness and choreographic quality […]. This is a conservative, romantic or perhaps even classical historical film […]. But it strives for authenticity, and is therefore incomparably better than Vidor's adaptation."

French critic Georges Sadoul commented: "more than in the sheer scale of the battle scenes", the film's "merit lies in its sense of the Russian landscape", to continue: "Though perhaps an impressive example of film-making on large scale", it was "ponderous by any standard" and "tediously faithful" to the novel, with "none of its narrative flair or spirit […]. Occasional bravura or touching episodes are not adequate for the dogged pedantry." Claude Mauriac wrote in Le Figaro littéraire that "we have already seen many Soviet films […]. But this is the most beautiful I have seen since, well, since when?" Peter Cowie noted that Bondarchuk brought to his adaptation "the epic sweep that had eluded King Vidor". Joseph Gelmis of Newsday agreed that the film was "superior [to Vidor's] as drama and spectacle. Bondartchouk isn't an innovator. Instead he uses virtually every movie technique extant ... an antiwar film that celebrates life, love, renewal".

Renata Adler of the New York Times wrote that "the characters—including Savelyeva […] who looks a little queasy, and Bondarchuk, too old to play Pierre—are dowdy automata". She added the film was "vulgar in the sense that it takes something great and makes it both pretentious and devoid of life […]. A failure in the sense that it is not even as enjoyable as any number of lesser films." Adler also disapproved of the English dubbing, opining that "although it is remarkable—an outer limit of what can be done—it was a mistake" and "proves once and for all the futility of dubbing". The New Yorker critic Penelope Gilliatt lambasted the process as well: "the decision to tack on alien voices seems madness". Judith Crist wrote in New York Magazine: "Those Russians…! And now, I bet they'll beat us to the moon! Chauvinism be damned—I'm putting Gone with the Wind into historic perspective and second place, for certainly War and Peace is not only […] the finest epic of our time, but also a great and noble translation of a literary masterpiece, surpassing our expectation and imagination."

The Time magazine reviewer wrote that the film "escapes greatness, except in cost and length […] the movie is awesome in war and pusillanimous in peace". In the novel, unlike in the picture, "the war is only the background […]. Pierre and Andrei are only shallow, literal representations of Tolstoy's characters […]. Moreover, the dubbing is disastrous." Richard Schickel of Life noted that the film's American distributors "have cut and dubbed it, ruining any merit it may have had" but the original "had its own deficiencies […]. Missing is Tolstoy's theory of history as well as his Christian message (neither fits Marxist theory very well), and without this underpinning the film lacks power and purpose." Roger Ebert commented that it was "a magnificently unique film […]. Bondarchuk, however, is able to balance the spectacular, the human, and the intellectual. Even in the longest, bloodiest, battle scenes there are vignettes that stand out […]. It is as spectacular as a movie can possibly be and yet it has a human fullness."

Review aggregator website Rotten Tomatoes reports that 100% of 19 reviews were positive, with an average rating of 8.97/10.

=== Analysis ===
Ian Aitken regarded War and Peace as "one of the most important" films produced during the 1964–68 transition from the Khrushchev Thaw to the Brezhnev Stagnation. In that period, the liberal atmosphere of the Thaw was still felt, although it was being marginalized as Soviet cinema became more restrained. The picture "departed from the officially sanctioned forms of Socialist realism" and rather, conformed to György Lukács' model of intensive totality in several aspects: it was based on a classic realist novel which itself influenced Lukács; had a complex plot structure, and portrayed the relations of individuals in a social context. Aitken added that at the same time, the picture employed several "overtly modernist" techniques: "symbolic, anti-realist use of color […] disembodied speech, rapid editing […] reflexive, hand-held camera". He believed the film's "chief importance" to lie in its demonstration of how "the Lukácsian model of intensive totality can be given a successful modernist inflection". He also noted that, while it was an example of critical realism rather than socialist realism and had modernist characteristics, War and Peace was "politically innocuous enough" to be celebrated by the Brezhnev government as a great achievement.

Lev Anninsky, on the contrary, viewed Bondarchuk's picture as a symbol of state-approved cinema, writing it was the "antithesis" of and a "total contrast" to Andrei Rublev, which he saw as representing the nonconformist approach in the field. Anninsky commented that War and Peace was imbued with patriotic motifs and "warm Russian tradition, which engulfs the viewer" while Tarkovsky had no such sense of "history as if it is a mother's womb".

Mira and Antonin Liehm considered it "foremost" among the early Brezhnevite films which received "official support" in order to bring "Russian classics […] and history to the screen in a manner in line with the official standards of taste". However, they added that "if measured by models and ambitions" it could "stand on its own merits".

David C. Gillespie noted orthodox Soviet messages in the film: "There are ideological touches […]. Russian and Austrian soldiers (but not their officers) show proletarian-like solidarity […]. There is no mention in the film of Pierre's early dalliance with freemasonry, as if contact with a foreign creed might erode some of his Russianness." He wrote that it "remains a paean to Russian military might and the strength of the Russian 'soul'".

=== Restoration ===
In 1986, Bondarchuk was requested to prepare War and Peace for a television broadcast. A 35mm copy of the series, which was filmed in parallel to the main version and had a 4:3 aspect ratio, rather than the 70-mm 2.20:1 was submitted, after being adapted by a team headed by Petritsky.

In 1999, as part of an initiative to restore its old classics, Mosfilm resolved to restore War and Peace. As the original 70mm reels were damaged beyond repair, the studio used the 1988 4:3 version and the original soundtrack to make a DVD edition, in a process that cost $80,000. This restoration was released by two separate Russian companies, those being Close-Up and the Russian Cinema Council (or RusCiCo for short). Close-Up's release was distributed domestically, being sold both as stand-alone releases for each part and a box set containing all four parts. By contrast, RusCiCo's 2003 release, which was sold as a five-disc box set, was aimed at the international market, with the release containing Reade's English dub and a French voice-over, subtitles in thirteen languages, and covers in Russian, English, and French; in addition to RusCiCo's own release, the contents of their disc were licensed out to various international distributors, including Image Entertainment in the United States, Artificial Eye in the United Kingdom, Njutafilm in Sweden, IVC in Japan, and Spectrum in South Korea.

In 2006 Karen Shakhnazarov, director of Mosfilm, announced that a new "frame by frame" restoration was being made. Which elements were being used is unclear, but the restoration would, claimed Shakhnazarov, probably be finished by the end of 2016. The completed restoration was first shown at the Film Society of Lincoln Center in New York City, then in Los Angeles and other major cities. The Criterion Collection released the restoration onto 3-disc DVD and 2-disc Blu-ray sets on 25 June 2019.

== See also ==
- Ah Vy, Seni, Moi Seni, Russian folk song
- Waterloo, a film about the Battle of Waterloo, also directed by Bondarchuk
- List of highest-grossing films in the Soviet Union
- List of Soviet submissions for the Academy Award for Best Foreign Language Film.
- List of submissions to the 41st Academy Awards for Best Foreign Language Film.
