= The Steppe (novella) =

1888 novella by Anton Chekhov

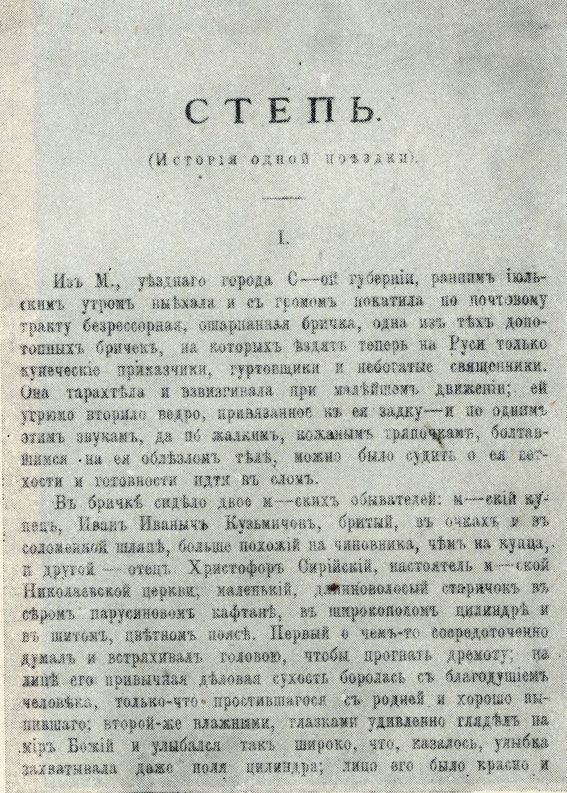
- First publication in Severny Vestnik
- Author: Anton Chekhov
- Original title: Степь
- Language: Russian
- Publisher: Severny Vestnik
- Publication date: 1888
- Publication place: Russia
- Text: The Steppe at Wikisource

The Steppe: The Story of a Journey (Russian: Степь. История одной поездки, romanized: Step'. Istoriya odnoy poyezdki) is a novella by Russian writer Anton Chekhov. In a narrative that drifts with the thought processes of the characters, Chekhov evokes a chaise journey across the steppe through the eyes of a young boy sent to live away from home, along with several companions, including his parish priest and his uncle, a merchant.

== Publication ==
The novella was first published in March 1888 by Severny Vestnik. With minor changes it was included in the Stories (Рассказы, 1888) to be reproduced unchanged in all its 13 editions (1889–1899). In a revised version it was included by Chekhov into Volume 4 of his Collected Works published in 1899–1901 by Adolf Marks.

== Background ==
In 1887, exhausted from overwork and ill health, Chekhov took a trip to Ukraine, which reawakened him to the beauty and vastness of the steppe. On his return, he began the novella-length short story, which he called "something rather odd and much too original", and which was eventually published in Severny Vestnik (The Northern Herald).

== Reception ==
Michael Finke has called The Steppe a "dictionary of Chekhov's poetics", suggesting that it represented a significant advance for Chekhov, exhibiting much of the quality of his mature fiction and winning him publication in a literary journal rather than a newspaper.

The novella was made into a Mosfilm movie in 1978, directed by Sergei Bondarchuk.
