= The Steppe (1977 film) =

1977 film by Sergei Bondarchuk

- Russian: Степь
- Directed by: Sergei Bondarchuk
- Written by: Sergei Bondarchuk
- Based on: The Steppe by Anton Chekhov
- Starring: Oleg Kuznetsov; Vladimir Sedov; Nikolay Trofimov; Sergei Bondarchuk; Ivan Lapikov
- Music by: Vyacheslav Ovchinnikov
- Production company: Mosfilm
- Release date: 1977
- Running time: 134 minutes
- Country: Soviet Union
- Language: Russian

The Steppe (Russian: Степь) is a 1977 Soviet historical drama film directed by Sergei Bondarchuk.

== Plot ==
The film is an adaptation of the eponymous novel by Anton Chekhov.

== Cast ==
- Oleg Kuznetsov as Yegorushka
- Vladimir Sedov as Kuzmichyov
- Nikolay Trofimov as Father Khristofor
- Sergei Bondarchuk as Yemelyan
- Ivan Lapikov as Pantelei
- Georgi Burkov as Vasya
- Stanislav Lyubshin as Konstantin Zvonyk
- Innokenty Smoktunovsky as Moisei Moiseyevich
- Anatoly Vasilyev as Dymov
- Valery Zakhariev as Styopka
- Igor Kvasha as Solomon Moiseyevich
- Lillian Malkina as Roza
- Irina Skobtseva as Countess Dranitskaya
- Natalya Andrejchenko as girl on sheaves
- Mikhail Gluzsky as Varlamov
- Mikhail Kokshenov as Kiryukha
- Vasily Livanov as Kazimir
