= Yelena Bondarchuk =

Soviet and Russian actress

- Елена Бондарчук
- Born: Yelena Sergeyevna Bondarchuk; 31 July 1962; Moscow, Russian SFSR, Soviet Union
- Died: 7 November 2009 (aged 47); Moscow, Russia
- Other names: Alyona Bondarchuk
- Occupation: Actress
- Years active: 1982–2009
- Spouse(s): Vitaly Kryukov (divorced; 1 child)

Yelena Sergeyevna Bondarchuk (Russian: Еле́на Серге́евна Бондарчу́к; 31 July 1962 – 7 November 2009) was a Soviet and Russian stage and film actress.

== Biography ==
She was one of three children born to actors Sergei Bondarchuk (1920–1994, died from heart attack) and Irina Skobtseva (1927–2020). Her half-sister is actress Natalya Bondarchuk and her younger brother is the actor Fyodor Bondarchuk (born 1967). She had one child, a son, by her marriage to Vitaly Kryukov, which ended in divorce.

== Death ==
She died of breast cancer on 7 November 2009, aged 47.

== Filmography ==
| Year | Title | Role | Notes |
|---|---|---|---|
| 1983 | Zhivaya raduga | | |
| 1984 | Parizhskaya drama | | |
| 1984 | Vremya i semya Konvey | | |
| 1984 | Prikhodi svobodnym | | |
| 1984 | Pokhishcheniye | | |
| 1986 | Boris Godunov | Tsarevna Kseniya | |
| 1986 | Karusel na bazarnoy ploshchadi | | |
| 2003 | Yantarnye krylya | Daughter | |
| 2007 | Ya ostayus | Anna | |
| 2010 | Odnoklassniki | | (final film role) |
