= Rostov College of Arts =

- Ростовский колледж искусств
- Established: 1900
- Director: Ishchenko, Irina Borisovna
- Location: Semashko Lane, 132/141b, Rostov-on-Don, Rostov Oblast, 344000, Russia; 47°14′07″N 39°42′26″E
- Website: rostartcollege.ru

The Rostov College of Arts (RCА) was founded in 1900, when the music classes of the Rostov branch of the Imperial Russian Musical Society governed by M. L. Presman (fellow student and friend of S. V. Rachmaninov) were transformed by the efforts of M. L. Presman into the Rostov Imperial Music School. In addition to educational activities, the new educational institution conducts performances of the orchestra, evenings of vocal and instrumental music.

== History ==
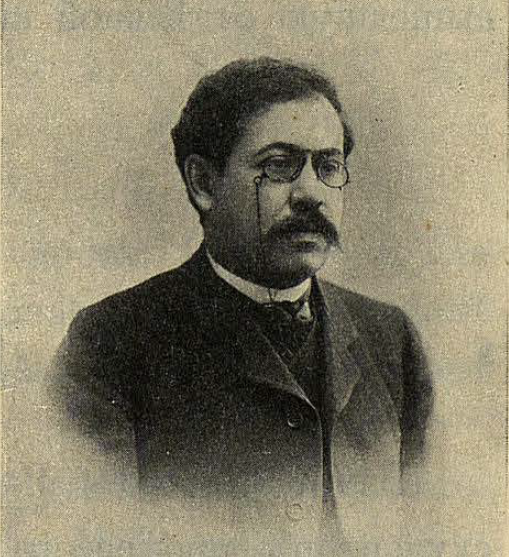
The first director: M. L. Presman

During the existence of the college, the names, the status of the institution and its location have been repeatedly changed. In the period of M. L. Presman's activity, the school for the first time moves from the old premises (Kazansky Lane – now the corner of the Moscowskaya Street and Gazetny Lane) with three small rooms and a hall for collective lessons in a new one – on Bolshaya Sadovaya Street, 83 with a good concert hall (formerly a women's room gymnasium); a large number of musical instruments are purchased and a music library is created. During the Second World War, the building was destroyed, a music library, tools, equipment and archives were lost. Since 1943 the school was located first on the street. Pushkinskaya, 95 on the basis of the music library named after Rimsky-Korsakov, and later in the house of the actor on the Gorky Street. In 1969 a new building was constructed (Semashko St., 132), in which the educational institution is located today.

1900 – the official date of the founding of the school, the founding of the four first departments – solo singing, pianoforte, strings and wind instruments;

1918 – thanks to the professionalism of the pedagogical collective and the high level of training of the graduates of the Musical College, the educational institution was given the status of the Conservatory.

1922 – reorganization of the Conservatory into the Musical-Practical Institute;

1927 – return to the status of secondary vocational education and renaming in the Musical College. A. V. Lunacharsky was due to the formation of a system of special education in the country;

1928 – the opening of four new branches in accordance with the curricula approved by the People's Commissariat for Education – the theoretical, composer, music-pedagogical, conductor-choral and folk instruments;

1936 – by the order of the Committee for Arts, the Musical College was renamed into the Musical College;

1959 – the opening of the musical comedy branch on the basis of the vocal department;

1961 – the opening of the correspondence department in connection with the huge need for teaching staff for the newly opened music schools in the 60's and 70's in the Rostov region;

1963 – renaming of the Musical College in the Rostov School of Arts due to unification with the theatrical school and the opening of the theater department;

1974 – the opening of the department "Musical variety art";

1990 – the opening of a new structural subdivision of the school – the School of Aesthetic Education for children aged 4–7;

1992 – the opening at the Rostov School of Art of the Experimental Children's Music School for gifted children;

2002 – opening of the department of choreography on the basis of the school and the Musical Theater;

2007 – assignment to the educational institution of college status and renaming to the Rostov College of Arts.

The college was headed by M. L. Presman (1900–1912), N. K. Avierino (1913–1919), M. F. Gnesin (1919–1921), N.Z. Kheifets (1921–1930), M.I. Golovenko (1930–1934), G. S. Dombaev (1934–1937), M. A. Mankovskaya (1937–1964), G. I. Bezrodny (1964–1976), A. I. Kusyakov (1979–1981) ), G. P. Vandenko (1981–1998), A. A. Usenko (1998–2002), I. B. Ischenko (2002-to-date).
