= Red Bells =

- Directed by: Sergei Bondarchuk
- Written by: Sergei Bondarchuk; Valentin Yezhov; Ricardo Garibay; Carlos Ortiz Tejeda
- Starring: Franco Nero; Ursula Andress
- Cinematography: Vadim Yusov
- Edited by: Mario Morra
- Music by: Jorge Eras
- Release date: 1982
- Countries: Soviet Union; Italy; Mexico

Red Bells (also known as Mexico in Flames, Insurgent Mexico and Red Bells Part I – Mexico on Fire) is a 1982 adventure-drama film directed by Sergei Bondarchuk. It was coproduced by Soviet Union (where it was released as Krasnye kolokola, film pervyy – Meksika v ogne), Italy (where is known as Messico in fiamme) and Mexico (where its title is Campanas rojas). It is the first of a two-part film centered on the life and career of John Reed, the revolutionary communist journalist that had already inspired Warren Beatty's Reds. This chapter focuses on Reed's reportage about the 1915 Mexican revolution. It was followed by Red Bells II.

== Plot ==
The plot is set in 1913 Mexico, during the height of the Mexican Revolution.

Two peasant armies, led by Emiliano Zapata in the south and Francisco "Pancho" Villa in the north, fight intense battles as they advance toward the capital, held by the forces of dictator General Victoriano Huerta. Amid the chaos of war, an American journalist, John Reed, arrives at the northern front to interview the revolutionary leader Pancho Villa.

== Cast ==
- Franco Nero as John Reed
- Ursula Andress as Mabel Dodge
- Jorge Luke as Emiliano Zapata
- Eraclio Zepeda as Pancho Villa
- Blanca Guerra as Isabel
- Sydne Rome as Louise Bryant

== See also ==
- Reed: Insurgent Mexico (1973)
- Reds (1981) an American film about Reed made around the same time.
