= They Fought for Their Country =

1975 film

- Original poster by Konstantin Antonov 1975
- Directed by: Sergei Bondarchuk
- Written by: Sergei Bondarchuk; Mikhail Sholokhov
- Starring: Vasily Shukshin; Vyacheslav Tikhonov; Sergei Bondarchuk; Georgi Burkov; Yuri Nikulin; Ivan Lapikov
- Cinematography: Vadim Yusov
- Music by: Vyacheslav Ovchinnikov
- Release date: 22 May 1975
- Running time: 137 minutes
- Country: Soviet Union
- Language: Russian

They Fought for Their Country (Russian: Они сражались за Родину, romanized: Oni srazhalis' za Rodinu) is a 1975 Soviet war film, directed by Sergei Bondarchuk and based on the eponymous novel written by Mikhail Sholokhov. It was entered into the 1975 Cannes Film Festival. The story centers around a Soviet platoon fighting a rearguard action during the German drive on Stalingrad. The film was selected as the Soviet entry for the Best Foreign Language Film at the 49th Academy Awards, but was not accepted as a nominee.

== Plot ==
The film takes place in July 1942. After suffering severe losses in battle, a Soviet rifle regiment retreats to Stalingrad. During a rest stop on the Don steppe, one of the regiment's soldiers, Pyotr Lopakhin, goes to a nearby village to get salt and a bucket for freshly caught crayfish. Relying on his conversationalism and charm, Lopakhin approaches an older Cossack woman, but is met with disdain as the soldiers retreat, leaving the locals to fend for themselves. After a difficult conversation, it is revealed that, despite his outward jovialness, he is deeply worried about the fate of the country, and the old woman fulfills his request.

Interrupting the cooking of their crayfish, an order arrives from command directing the regiment to occupy and hold the hill in the middle of the steppe. Digging trenches in the rocky ground, the regiment's men establish positions and repel the first tank attack with grenades and anti-tank rifles. Before the second wave, German aircraft bomb the regiment's positions, killing many soldiers, and Private Nikolai Streltsov, Lopakhin's friend, suffers a severe concussion. The second German tank attack nearly breaks through the regiment, but the arriving Soviet reinforcements drive the German forces back.

The regiment marches through a burning wheat field at night. Private Ivan Zvyagintsev, a former combine operator, is horrified by the extent of the damage caused by the war.

Having reached the next farmstead, the soldiers prepare for battle, and Lopakhin, flirting with a local woman, manages to obtain two jugs of cold milk for his unit. In the next battle, using a PTRD, he shoots down a German Junkers Ju 87 attack aircraft, which explodes upon crashing into a hill.

Later, after some time in another place, the regiment again engages in battle with enemy tanks. The tanks crush the positions of the defenders: the young corporal Kochetygov died, setting a German tank on fire with a Molotov cocktail. The remaining Soviet soldiers launch a counterattack, during which Private Zvyagintsev is severely wounded by artillery shrapnel. The Germans are forced into retreat, and a young nurse pulls Zvyagintsev from the battlefield. After having buried the last officer in the regiment, the regiment moves on again. During their break, Private Nekrasov amuses the soldiers with a story about how he accidentally startled an old woman at night who thought that he was trying to pester her. In the field hospital, Zvyagintsev is operated on without anesthesia as the surgeon extracts numerous fragments from his legs and back.

The remnants of the regiment are stationed in yet another village, but there have run out of food and the locals refuse to feed the retreating soldiers. Lopakhin attempts to charm a local villager, Natalya, and helps her with farmwork. That night, Lopakhin tries to seduce her, but she hits him in the eye in the dark. The next morning, Lopakhin finds a table full of food and concludes that his plan was a success after all. Natalya bitterly tells him that she has a husband who is now in the hospital and that she only prepared the food for them because the regiment’s sergeant had told the local kolkhoz chairman that they had recently prevailed in a fierce battle. Natalya adds that the locals are ready to give everything they have, if only the soldiers would protect them.

The regiment is withdrawn to the rear for rest and reinforcements. Lopakhin spots his old friend, Nikolai Streltsov, in the crowd. It turns out that he had escaped from the field hospital, and, despite being completely deaf and suffering from a concussion, has rejoined his comrades. A recently arrived colonel heartily thanks the fighters and kisses the banner of the regiment, which has been diligently guarded throughout the film. Large forces of Soviet troops continue moving toward Stalingrad.

== Cast ==
- Vasily Shukshin as Piotr Lopakhin
- Vyacheslav Tikhonov as private Nikolay Strel'tsov
- Sergei Bondarchuk as private Ivan Zvyagintsev
- Georgi Burkov as private Alexandr Kopytovskij
- Yuri Nikulin as private Nekrasov
- Ivan Lapikov as starshina Poprischenko
- Nikolai Gubenko as Lieutenant Goloshchekov
- Andrei Rostotsky as gefreiter Kochetygov
- Nikolai Volkov as private Nikiforov
- Nikolai Shutko as cook Lisichenko
- Yevgeni Samojlov as Colonel Marchenko
- Nonna Mordyukova as Natalya Stepanovna
- Lidiya Fedoseyeva-Shukshina as Glasha
- Innokenti Smoktunovsky as Doctor

== See also ==
- List of submissions to the 49th Academy Awards for Best Foreign Language Film
- List of Soviet submissions for the Academy Award for Best Foreign Language Film
