= Red Bells II =

- Directed by: Sergei Bondarchuk
- Starring: Franco Nero; Sydne Rome
- Cinematography: Vadim Yusov
- Edited by: Claudio M. Cutry
- Music by: Georgy Sviridov
- Release date: 1983
- Countries: Soviet Union; Italy; Mexico

Red Bells II (also known as 10 Days That Shook the World and Red Bells Part II – I Saw the Birth of the New World; released in the Philippines as Comrade in Arms) is a 1983 adventure-drama film directed by Sergei Bondarchuk. It was coproduced by Soviet Union (where it was released as Krasnye kolokola, film vtoroy – Ya videl rozhdenie novogo mira and Krasnye kolokola II), Italy (where it is known as I dieci giorni che sconvolsero il mondo) and Mexico (where its title is Campanas rojas II – Rusia 1917). It is the last of a two-part film centered on the life and career of John Reed, the revolutionary communist journalist that had already inspired Warren Beatty's Reds. This chapter focuses on Reed's book Ten Days That Shook the World.

== Plot ==
Set in 1913, a tumultuous and bloody year for the Mexican people, the story unfolds during the height of the Mexican Revolution.

American journalist John Reed travels to the northern border region to report on the unfolding conflict. Meanwhile, peasant armies led by Emiliano Zapata in the south and Francisco "Pancho" Villa in the north launch fierce campaigns to capture the capital, held by dictator Victoriano Huerta.

== Cast ==
- Franco Nero as John Reed
- Sydne Rome as Louise Bryant
- Olegar Fedoro as Colonel Polkovnikov
- Anatoli Ustyzhaninov as Vladimir Lenin
- Bohdan Stupka as Alexander Kerensky
- Valery Barinov as Nikolai Podvoisky

== Release ==
Red Bells II was released in the Soviet Union in 1983. In the Philippines, the film was released as Comrade in Arms by Movierama International on July 29, 1988.

== See also ==
- Red Bells
- Reds (1981) an American film about Reed made around the same time.
