= Sergei Bondarchuk =

Soviet and Russian actor and filmmaker (1920–1994)

- Сергей Бондарчук
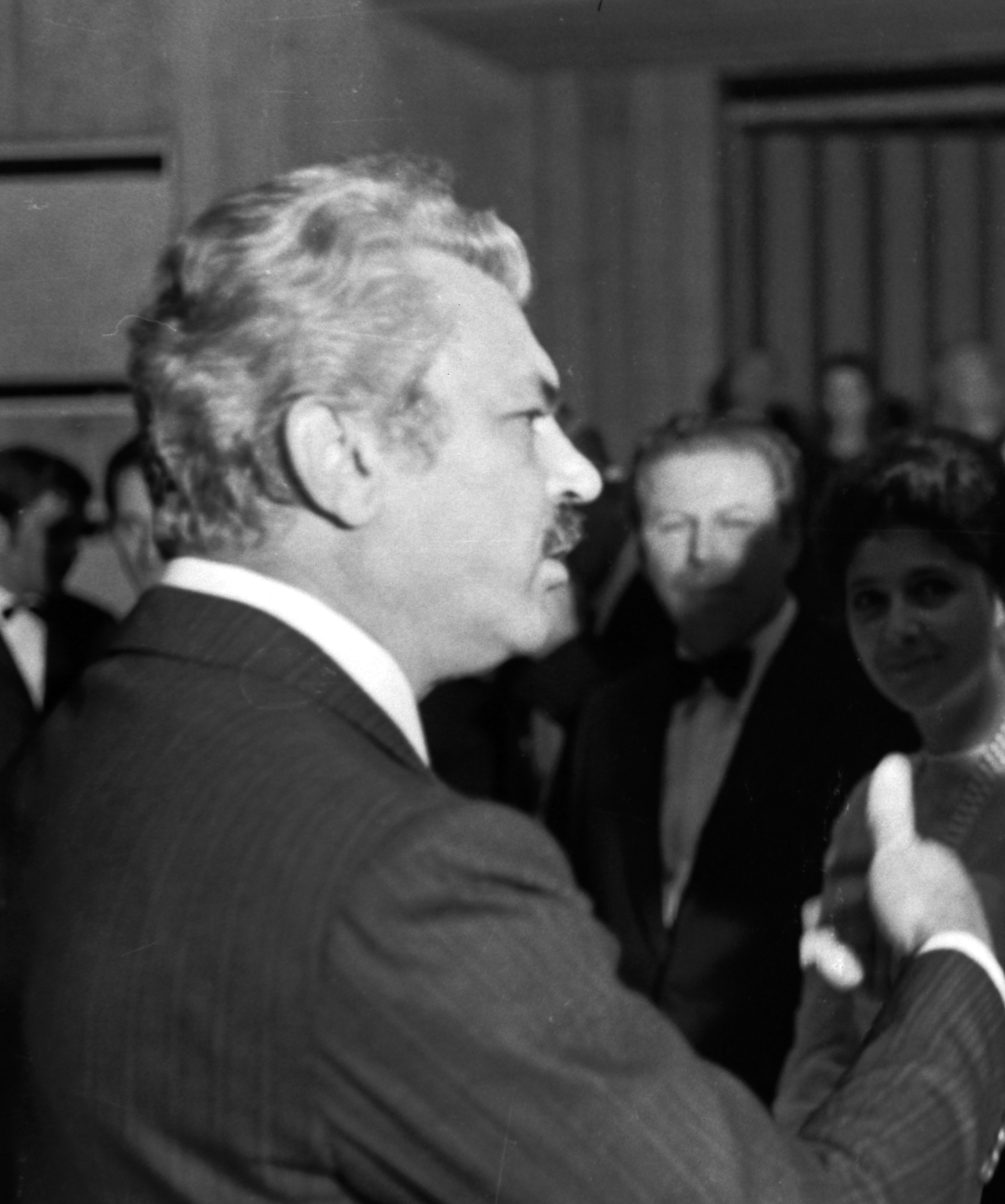
- Bondarchuk in 1969
- Born: 25 September 1920; Belozerka, Ukrainian SSR, USSR
- Died: 20 October 1994 (aged 74); Moscow, Russia
- Resting place: Novodevichy Cemetery, Moscow
- Citizenship: Soviet Union, Russia
- Education: Rostov College of Arts
- Occupations: Actor; film director; screenwriter
- Years active: 1948–1994
- Notable work: War and Peace (1965-67); Waterloo (1970)
- Title: Hero of Socialist Labour (1980); People's Artist of the USSR (1952)
- Spouses: Inna Makarova (m. 1949; div. 1956) Irina Skobtseva (m. 1959)
- Children: Natalya; Yelena; Fyodor
- Awards: Academy Awards (1969)

Sergei Fyodorovich Bondarchuk (Note: Russian: Сергей Фёдорович Бондарчук, romanized: Sergey Fyodorovich Bondarchuk, IPA: [sʲɪrˈɡʲej ˈfʲɵdərəvʲɪdʑ bəndɐrˈtɕuk]; Ukrainian: Сергій Федорович Бондарчук, romanized: Serhii Fedorovych Bondarchuk) (25 September 1920 – 20 October 1994) was a Soviet and Russian actor and filmmaker, born in Ukraine, who was one of the leading figures of Soviet cinema in the 1950s, 1960s and 1970s. He is known for his sweeping period dramas, including War and Peace (1966-67), his internationally acclaimed four-part film adaptation of Leo Tolstoy's novel, and for Waterloo (1970), a Napoleonic War epic.

Bondarchuk's work won him numerous international accolades. War and Peace won Bondarchuk, who both directed and acted in the leading role of Pierre Bezukhov, the Golden Globe Award for Best Foreign Language Film (1968), and the Academy Award for Best Foreign Language Film in 1968. He was made both a Hero of Socialist Labour and a People's Artist of the USSR.

== Early life and education ==
Sergei Fyodorovich Bondarchuk was born in the village of Belozerka (present-day Bilozerka, Ukraine) on September 25, 1920, in the family of Orthodox Christian peasants Fyodor Petrovich and Tatyana Vasilievna (nee Tokarenko). His paternal grandfather, Pyotr Konstantinovich Bondarchuk, was ethnically Bulgarian, the grandmother, Matryona Fyodorovna Sirvulya, was Serbian. At the time of his birth, his father was serving in the Red Army. His mother, being a deeply religious person, named her son in honor of Sergius of Radonezh and baptized him in the Annunciation Monastery near Kherson.

Bondarchuk spent his childhood in the cities of Yeysk and Taganrog, graduating from the Taganrog School Number 4 in 1938. His first performance as an actor was onstage of the Taganrog Theatre in 1937. He continued studies at the Rostov College of Arts (1938–1942).

After his studies, he was conscripted into the Red Army during World War II against Nazi Germany. Bondarchuk took part in the initial stage of the Battle of the Caucasus, then was reorganized into the Don Front. From October 19 to December 8, 1942, he fought at Stalingrad, took part in Operation Uranus. He was decorated for his courage in battle and was discharged with honors in 1946.

== Film career ==
In 1948, Bondarchuk made his film debut in The Young Guard directed by Sergei Gerasimov. In 1952, he was awarded the Stalin Prize for the leading role in the film Taras Shevchenko; that same year, at the age of 32, he became the youngest Soviet actor ever to receive the top dignity of People's Artist of the USSR. In 1955, he starred with his future wife Irina Skobtseva in Othello. In 1959, he made his directorial debut with Fate of a Man, based on Mikhail Sholokhov's short story of the same name. The film was internationally acclaimed upon its release.

Bondarchuk earned international fame with his epic production of Tolstoy's War and Peace, which on original release totaled more than seven hours of cinema, took six years to complete and won Bondarchuk, who both directed and acted in the role of Pierre Bezukhov, the Academy Award for Best Foreign Language Film in 1968. The year after his victory, in 1969, he starred as Martin with Yul Brynner and Orson Welles in the Yugoslav epic Battle of Neretva, directed by Veljko Bulajic.

His first English-language film was 1970's Waterloo, produced by Dino De Laurentiis. In Europe, the critics called it remarkable for the epic battle scenes and details in capturing the Napoleonic era. However, it failed at the box office. To prevent running into hurdles with the Soviet government, he joined the Communist Party in 1970. A year later, he was appointed president of the Union of Cinematographers, while he continued his directing career, steering toward political films, directing Boris Godunov before being dismissed from the semi-governmental post in 1986.

In 1973, he was the president of the Jury at the 8th Moscow International Film Festival.

In 1975, he directed They Fought for Their Country, which was entered into the 1975 Cannes Film Festival. In 1982 came Red Bells, based on John Reed's Ten Days That Shook the World (which serves as the film's alternative title). His 1986 film Boris Godunov was also screened at Cannes that year.

Bondarchuk's last feature film, and his second in English, was an epic TV version of Sholokhov's And Quiet Flows the Don, starring Rupert Everett. It was filmed in 1992–1993 but premiered on Channel One only in November 2006, as there were disputes concerning the Italian studio that was co-producing over unfavorable clauses in his contract, which left the tapes locked in a bank vault. After his death, the film remained locked for several years until it was recovered and released in 2006.

In 1995, he was posthumously awarded an honorable diploma for contribution to cinema at the 19th Moscow International Film Festival.

== Personal life ==
He first married Inna Makarova, mother to his oldest daughter, Natalya Bondarchuk (born 1950). Natalya is remembered for her role in Andrei Tarkovsky's 1972 film Solaris.

He met his second wife, Irina Skobtseva, when both were appearing in Othello, and they married in 1959. They had two children, actress Yelena Bondarchuk (1962–2009) and son Fyodor (born 1967), (who starred with Bondarchuk in Boris Godunov), a popular Russian film actor and director best known for his box-office hit The 9th Company (2005).

== Death ==
Bondarchuk died on October 20, 1994, at the age of 74 in Moscow from myocardial infarction. Before his death, he was confessed and given communion by Hieromonk Tikhon (Shevkunov). He is buried in the Novodevichy Cemetery, Moscow. In June 2007, his wife Irina Skobtseva unveiled a bronze statue of Bondarchuk in his native Yeysk.

== Honours and awards ==
- Stalin Prize, 1st class (1952) – for the main role in the film Taras Shevchenko and the role of Sergei Tutarinov in Knight of the Golden Star (1950)
- Lenin Prize (1960) – for the film The Destiny of Man (1959)
- Golden Globe Award for Best Foreign Language Film (1968) – for the film War and Peace
- Academy Award for Best Foreign Language Film (1968) – for the film War and Peace
- Vasilyev Brothers State Prize of the RSFSR (1977) – for the film They Fought for Their Country
- Hero of Socialist Labour (1980)
- Shevchenko National Prize (1982) – for his performance as Cardinal Montanelli in the film The Gadfly (1980)
- USSR State Prize (1984) – for the film Red Bells
- Order of Lenin, twice
- Order of the October Revolution
- Order of the Patriotic War, 2nd class
- Order of the Red Banner of Labour
- Honored Artist of the RSFSR (1951)
- People's Artist of the USSR (1952)

== Filmography ==
=== Acting credits ===
Year	Title	Role	Notes
1948	The Young Guard	Comrade Valko	
1948	Tale of a True Man	Gvozdev	Uncredited
1949	Michurin	Uralets	Uncredited
1949	Glorious Path	secretary of the city committee	Uncredited
1951	Dream of a Cossack	Sergei Tutarinov	
1951	Taras Shevchenko	Taras Shevchenko	
1953	Admiral Ushakov	Tikhon Alekseyevich Prokofiev	
1953	Attack from the Sea	Tikhon Alekseyevich Prokofiev	
1954	Least We Forget	writer Harmash	
1955	The Grasshopper	Dr. Osip Stepanovich Dymov	
1955	Unfinished Story	Yuri Sergeyevich Yershov	
1955	Othello	Othello	
1956	Ivan Franko	Ivan Franko	
1957	Two from the Same Block	Azis	
1958	Soldiers Went	Matvei Krylov	
1959	Fate of a Man	Andrei Sokolov	Grand Prix at the 1st Moscow International Film Festival
1960	Era notte a Roma	Fyodor Aleksandrovic Nazukov	
1960	Splendid Days	Korostelyov	
1966-67	War and Peace	Pierre Bezukhov	Grand Prix at the 4th Moscow International Film Festival
1969	Battle of Neretva	Martin	
1969	Golden Gates		background voice
1970	Uncle Vanya	Dr. Mikhail Lvovich Astrov	
1973	Silence of Doctor Evans	Martin Evans	
1974	Such tall mountains	Ivan Stepanov	
1975	They Fought for Their Country	Ivan Zvyagintsev	
1975	Take Aim	Igor Kurchatov	
1976	Vrhovi Zelengore	Professor	
1977	Poshekhon Oldie		
1977	The Steppe	Emelyan	background voice
1978	Velvet Season	Mister Bradbury	
1978	Father Sergius	Father Sergius	
1979	Profession: film actor		cameo
1979	Take off	Narrator	background voice
1980	The Gadfly	Cardinal Montanelli	TV movie
1985	Bambi's Childhood	Narrator	
1986	Boris Godunov	Boris Godunov	
1988	Incident in Airport	Major-General Tokarenko	
1990	Battle of Three Kings	Selim	
1992	Storm over Rus	Boyar Morozov	
2000	Sergei Bondarchuk	himself	Documentary

=== Filmmaking credits ===
Year	Title	Role	Notes
1959	Fate of a Man	Andrei Sokolov	
1966-67	War and Peace	Pierre Bezukhov	
1970	Waterloo		
1975	They Fought for Their Country	Zvyagintsev	
1973	Battle of Sutjeska		Writer
1977	The Steppe	Yemelian	
1982	Red Bells		
1983	Red Bells II		
1986	Boris Godunov	Boris Godunov	
2006	Quiet Flows the Don		Filmed between 1992 and 1993
