= Igor Talankin =

Soviet and Russian film director and screenwriter

- Игорь Таланкин
- Born: 3 October 1927; Bogorodsk, Moscow Governorate, Russian SFSR, Soviet Union
- Died: 24 July 2010 (aged 82); Moscow, Russia
- Occupations: Film director; screenwriter
- Years active: 1960–1992

Igor Vasilyevich Talankin (Russian: Игорь Васильевич Таланкин; 3 October 1927 – 24 July 2010) was a Soviet and Russian film director and screenwriter. His film Splendid Days (1960, co-directed with Georgiy Daneliya) won the Crystal Globe (the main award) at the Karlovy Vary International Film Festival, and Tchaikovsky (1969) was nominated for the Academy Award for Best Foreign Language Film.

== Selected filmography ==
- Splendid Days (1960)
- Introduction to Life (1962)
- Day Stars (1968)
- Tchaikovsky (1969)
- Take Aim (1974)
- Father Sergius (1978)
- Starfall (1981)
- Time for Rest from Saturday to Monday (1984)
