= Lermontov (film) =

- Russian: Лермонтов
- Directed by: Nikolay Burlyaev
- Written by: Vasiliy Solovyov; Vladimir Vozovikov
- Starring: Nikolay Burlyaev; Ivan Burlyaev; Vladimir Faibyshev; Galina Belyayeva; Natalya Bondarchuk
- Cinematography: Oleg Martynov
- Edited by: L. Kuznetsova
- Music by: Boris Petrov
- Production company: Mosfilm
- Release date: 1986
- Running time: 100 minute
- Country: Soviet Union
- Language: Russian

Lermontov (Russian: Лермонтов) is a 1986 Soviet biographical drama film directed by Nikolay Burlyaev.

== Plot ==
The film tells about the life and death of the great Russian poet Mikhail Lermontov.

== Cast ==
- Nikolay Burlyaev as Mikhail Yuryevich Lermontov
- Ivan Burlyaev as Mikhail Lermontov as a child (as Vanya Burlyayev)
- Vladimir Faibyshev as Mikhail Lermontov as a child (as Vova Faibyshev)
- Galina Belyayeva as Varvara Lopukhina
- Natalya Bondarchuk as Mariya Mikhailovna Lermontova, Mikhail's mother
- Boris Plotnikov as Yuri Petrovich Lermontov, Mikhail's father / Pushkin
- Inna Makarova as Elizaveta Alekseyevna Arsenyeva, Mikhail's grandmother
- Yury Moroz as Nikolai Martynov
- Sergei Smirnov as Svyatoslav Rayevskii
- Dmitriy Zolotukhin as Dmitriy Alekseyevich Stolypin, Mikhail's great-uncle
- Maris Liepa as Nicholas I
- Uldis Lieldigs as Alexander von Benckendorff
- Algimantas Masiulis as Pyotr Kleinmichel
- Katya Lycheva as Ekaterine Chavchavadze in childhood
- Tatyana Piletskaya as Princess Maria Nesselrode
