= Artem Yachmennikov =

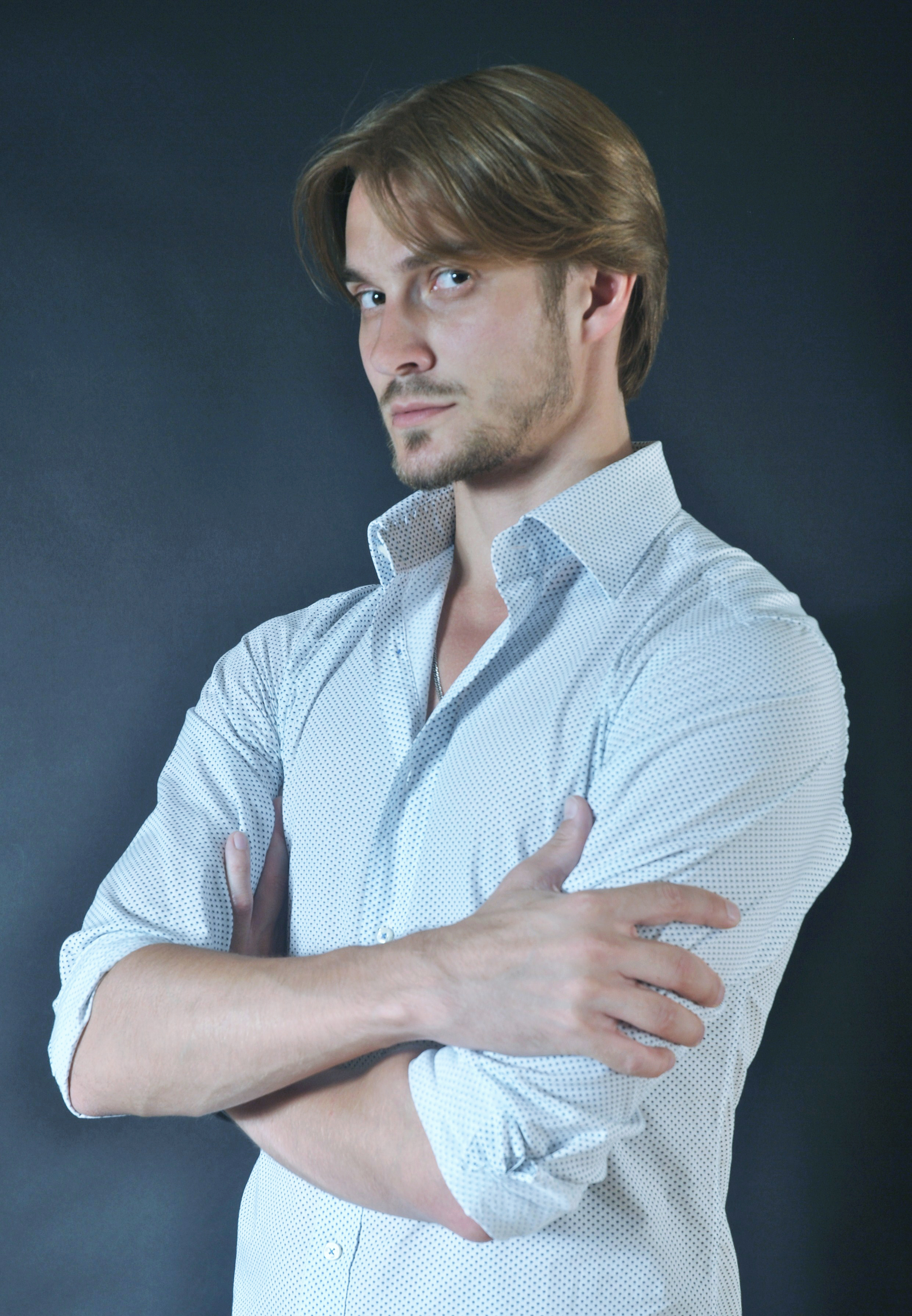
- Portrait by Allan Warren, 2013
- Born: February 25, 1983 (age 43); Astrakhan, Russia
- Occupation: ballet dancer
- Years active: 2001–present

Artem Nikolayevich Yachmennikov (born 25 February 1983) is a ballet artist, soloist and premier at leading theaters, including the Bolshoi Theatre and Mariinsky Theatre.

== Biography ==
Yachmennikov started dancing at age 6, with Russian folk dances in the choreographic ensemble "Mozaika" in Saint-Petersburg. In 1993, at age 10, he passed a 3-tour exam for the Vaganova Academy of Russian Ballet. He was known as a hardworking student. His main teachers at the Academy were L. Melnikova, P. Silkin, and A. Garbuz.

Yachmennikov graduated with high marks in 2001 and was immediately invited to join the troupe at the Mariinsky Theatre. His teacher at the time was Rejepmyrat Abdyyew. At 18 years old, Yachmennikov debuted in the ballet Don Quixote as Espada. During those years, he had many solo parts in the ballet repertoire, including Steptext (William Forsythe) and Le Corsaire (Birbanto).

In 2006, Yachmennikov accepted an invitation from the Dutch National Ballet and went to Amsterdam to perform as a principal dancer there. His teachers were Rinat Gizatulin and Guillaume Graffin. During that time, Russian ballet legend, Natalia Makarova, came to the Dutch National Ballet to rehearse with its dancers. When she saw Yachmennikov's rehearsal of Solor in the ballet La Bayadère, she recommended him as a soloist for this ballet. Yachmennikov debuted the role successfully and became a regular soloist for the next two years. He performed in leading parts in ballets such as La Bayadere (Solor), La Sylphide (James), The Sleeping Beauty (Prince Desire), Romeo and Juliet (Romeo), Coppelia (Franz), Sarcasmen, Adagio Hammerklavier (Hans Van Manen), and Black Cake. (Hans Van Manen)

In 2008, Yachmennikov went back to Russia. From 2008 until 2011, he performed as the first soloist at the Bolshoi Theatre in Moscow. His teacher during this time was an honored artist of Russia, Boris Akimov. At the Bolshoi, he performed in many classical and modern ballets: Les Sylphides (Poet), Symphony in C (George Balanchine), Serenade (George Balanchine), and Russian Seasons (Alexei Ratmansky).

In 2009, Yachmennikov participated in the Korea International Ballet Competition, winning a silver medal. He also performed as a guest-principal dancer in the ballet Swan Lake (Prince Siegfried) at the Lithuanian National Opera and Ballet Theatre.

Yachmennikov participated in many gala-concerts in Europe, Ukraine, China, South America and Japan.

In 2010, Yachmennikov accepted an invitation from the San Francisco Ballet and performed there as a principal dancer from 2010 until 2011.

Other ballets from his repertoire include: Giselle (Albrecht), The Nutcracker (Prince, Snow King) by Helgi Tomasson, and Symphony in C (George Balanchine). Unfortunately, his career was interrupted because of a serious injury to his ankle, suffered while rehearsing a new ballet. After undergoing surgery, he returned and danced as a guest artist in theaters around the world. He collaborated with the Charity Fund of Maris Liepa, led by Andris Liepa, and performed in a world tour with his project Russian Seasons, dancing in Scheherazade (Golden Slave), Cleopatra/Ida Rubinstein (Robert de Montesquiou), choreographed by Patrick de Bana, and The Firebird (Ivan-Tsarevich).

Yachmennikov was invited to perform at the premiere of the Primorsky Theatre of Ballet and Opera in Vladivostok and an author's ballet, 14 Symphony, was choreographed by A. Akhmetov especially for him.

Throughout his career, Yachmennikov worked with choreographers such as Natalia Makarova, Hans van Manen, Rudi van Dantzig, John Neumeier, Peter Wright, Alexei Ratmansky, William Forsythe, Patrick de Bana and Francesco Ventriglia. His partners included Svetlana Zakharova, Ilze Liepa, Sofiane Sylve, Yuanyuan Tan, Igone de Jongh, Larissa Lezhnina, Maria Alexandrova, and Maria Abashova.

In 2014, Yachmennikov performed on Italian TV in Ballando Con Le Stelle of Milly Carlucci on RAI UNO to the song of the famous Italian singer, Gigi D'Alessio

== Repertoire ==
- Nutcracker : Prince, Snow King
- Romeo and Juliet : Romeo
- La Sylphide : James
- Swan Lake : Prince Siegfried
- La Bayadère : Solor
- Giselle : Albrecht
- Serenade : Soloist
- The Firebird : Ivan-Tsarevich
- Scheherazade (Rimsky-Korsakov) Golden Slave
- The Sleeping Beauty (ballet) Prince Désiré

== Video ==
- Artem Yachmennikov - Sleeping Beauty on YouTube
- Artem Yachmennikov - Madame Bovary on YouTube
- Artem Yachmennikov - Sarcasmen on YouTube
- Artem Yachmennikov - Interview about ballet Swan Lake on YouTube
- Artem Yachmennikov - Premier of the ballet Swan Lake on YouTube
