= Nikolai Martynov =

Russian army officer who killed Mikhail Lermontov (1815-1875)

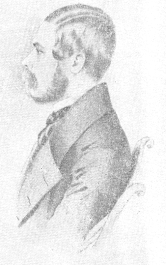
Nikolai Martynov, watercolor by Thomas Wright

Nikolai Solomonovich Martynov (Russian: Николай Соломонович Мартынов; 1815–1875) was the Russian army officer who fatally shot the poet Mikhail Lermontov in a cliff-edge duel on July 27, 1841, despite Lermontov's supposedly having made it known that he was going to shoot into the air. At the same time, the details of the clash and the duel were largely hidden and mystified by Martynov and the seconds of both duelists before the military court, and not all of its details have been reconstructed reliably enough to date.

== In popular culture ==
- 1943 — In the film "Lermontov" (directed by Albert Gendelstein), Martynov was played by Pavel Massalsky.
- 1986 — In the film "Lermontov" (directed by Nikolai Burlyaev), Martynov was played by Yuri Moroz.
- 2025 — In the film "Lermontov" (directed by Bakur Bakuradze), Martynov was played by Yevgeny Romantsov.
