= Tankers (film) =

2018 film by Konstantin Maksimov

Indestructible
- Film poster
- Directed by: Konstantin Maksimov
- Screenplay by: Valeriya Baikeyeva; Konstantin Maksimov
- Produced by: Aleksey Pimanov; Olga Pogodina; Denis Anisimov
- Starring: Andrey Chernyshov; Vladimir Epifantsev; Oleg Fomin; Olga Pogodina; Sergey Gorobchenko; Nikolai Dobrynin
- Cinematography: Elena Ivanova
- Edited by: Valeriya Baykeeva; Konstantin Mazur
- Music by: Oleg Volyando
- Production companies: Oda Film; Pimanov and partners Mosfilm
- Distributed by: 20th Century Fox CIS
- Release date: 25 October 2018
- Running time: 85 minutes
- Country: Russia
- Language: Russian
- Budget: 300 million RUB
- Box office: 258 620 279 RUB

Indestructible (Russian: Несокрушимый, romanized: Nesokrushimyy) is a 2018 Russian war film directed by Konstantin Maksimov. It was developed under the working title Tankers (Russian: Танкисты, romanized: Tankisty).

The film is based on the real story of the feat of the crew of a Soviet KV-1 tank under the command of Semyon Konovalov, which took part in an unequal battle on 13 July 1942, and destroyed 16 tanks, two armored vehicles and eight other vehicles from enemy forces in the area of the village of Nizhnemityakin, Tarasovsky District, Rostov Oblast.

On 9 September 2018, a special private screening of the film for military personnel of the Tamanskaya and Kantemirov Divisions took place on Tanker's Day.

The film was released in Russia on 25 October 2018 by 20th Century Fox CIS.

== Plot ==
The film opens with tank commander Semyon Konovalov's KV-1 hunting and destroying a German PzKpfw IV. He then goes on to rejoin a beached T-34, and berates the commander for straying away from the platoon. The commander of the other tank informs him of a lone Panzer he had gone after prior to getting stuck, but this reason only further angers Konovalov, and he asks them to get the tank out of the mud themselves, "to see what it's like to have no platoon support." Shortly, the lone Panzer ambushes Konovalov's tank, then goes on to eliminate the T-34. It is the second crew he has lost.

In a battle-ridden meadow, Soviet tankmen salvage for parts among the destroyed tanks. One of them, Gubkin, gossips about a miracle engineer who is known to bring dead tanks to life, which annoys his older comrades.

Konovalov, meanwhile, has healed now, and has returned to the camp. The Deputy Political Officer of the Battalion Major Vladimir Krotov, wants Konovalov to be court martialed. His tone gives a hint of his jealousy for Konovalov since army school. The commanding officer, however refuses to put him on trial, stating that Konovalov is one of his best men.

On the outskirts of the camp, an engineer from the Kirov tank factory arrives at the battalion with brand new tanks. She is Pavla Chumak, who turns out to be Konovalov's ex-wife. Krotov is unaware of this and tries to woo her. Captain Konovalov is given a new crew, consisting of gunner Siitov, loader Bogdan, driver Rykov and radio operator Gubkin, along with a battered KV-1.

That night, Konovalov goes out into the abandoned battlefield without permission or notice, taking Rykov and Siitov with him. There, they become aware of German soldiers doing the same. Konovalov and Seetov capture one of the Germans, and Rykov gives them a false clear to get them to leave. After returning, Krotov again tries to have Konovalov punished on the pretext of deserting. The commander however says he and his men have shown bravery in action, and congratulates them on the prisoner. Meanwhile, Pavla manages to temporarily start the damaged KV's engine, and tests the tank alongside Konovalov. Still unaware of their relation, Krotov gets jealous when he sees Konovalov and Pavla together, leading him to send Konovalov's tank on patrol with two T-34 tanks, knowing full well that the KV is not fit for action. Sure enough, the tank cannot keep up with the others and is ordered back. Instead, Konovalov decides to take up a defensive position and engages and destroys three German tanks. However, his platoon commander has to report him for disobedience, which leads to a fist fight between Konovalov and Krotov.

The crew are unable to repair the KV in time for the offensive, which means they have to go to the front as tank-borne infantry-men. With no experience outside a tank, their fate remains uncertain. Pavla tries to convince the commanding officer to let her fix their tank, which he sympathetically denies. After she's gone, he rebukes Krotov, informing him of Pavla's relation to Konovalov. Krotov, regretting his actions apologizes to Konovalov, and they reconcile. Pavla desperately tries to get Konovalov's tank ready for the battle, but fails. At dawn break, the battalion gets the call to move out. As Konovalov and his men leave, she breaks down crying. Cantor, the battalion translator, sees her crying, and tells her that the captured German blurted about a KV-1 the Germans had captured and hidden in the woods. It was operational, but lacked a type-24 relay.

Konovalov and his crew are fighting on foot. A mortar explosion causes Bogdan to lose his balance, and his weapon strap gets stuck in a tank passing by. Rykov rushes out of cover and frees him, but ends up getting fatally shot. Krotov stops by to pass Pavla's message about the hidden tank to Konovalov. Hesitant at first, his crew join him and they leave to go to the mentioned area. They find Pavla who, has managed to get the tank running. As they make their way back to the battlefield, they unexpectedly come across a Panzer formation, who have taken a detour to flank the Soviets from the rear. Konovalov's crew fights all day against the numerically superior Germans, until they're taken out by the last remaining Panzer. The crew survives except for Bogdan, who died earlier while repairing the track, and Gubkin, who refused to leave the burning tank to cover them. The Germans, unaware of the crew still being alive, disembark their tank. Konovalov and Siitov quickly eliminate them, capture their tank, and drive it back to their lines.

== Cast ==
- Andrey Chernyshov as Captain Semyon Konovalov, tank commander
- Vladimir Epifantsev as Sergeant Siitov, gunner
- Oleg Fomin as Junior lieutenant Rykov, Senior Military Technician
- Olga Pogodina as Pavla Pavla, a production engineer, Semyon Konovalov's wife
- Sergey Gorobchenko as Major Vladimir Krotov, Deputy Political Officer of the Battalion
- Nikolai Dobrynin as Basich, a legless surgeon
- Vasily Sedykh as Junior sergeant Bogdan Shinkevich, driver
- Vladimir Kochetkov as Gubkin, radio operator-machine gunner
- Vasily Stepanov as Cantor, translator
- Dmitry Zolotukhin as Sable
- Oleg Chudnitsov as Armen
- Markus Kunze
- Nikita Salopin
- Anton Eskin
- Evgeniy Zelenskiy as Drozdov, tank commander
- Lera Gorin
- Aleksandr Tuarminskiy
- Olga Kavalay-Aksonov
- Maria Arnaut as Galya
- Yaroslav Khimchenko
- Dmitriy Sokolov as Krotov, a radio operator
- Sergey Rublev
- Ivan Kozhevnikov
- Roman Senkov as Sergeant Cheryshev, tankman
- Yuriy Balitskiy as Ratnikov, tankman

== Production ==
Filming (under the working title Tankers) began on 15 September 2016 in Mozhaysky District, Moscow Oblast, and took place with the support of the Ministry of Culture of the Russian Federation and the Russian Military Historical Society.

The film actively used computer special effects. More than 150 shots with computer graphics were created by the Russian studio Carboncore-vfx.

== Box office ==
In Russia, Tankers was a box office success.

== Criticism ==
The film contains inconsistencies related to the true story of Konovalov's feat and other historical inaccuracies. Some military equipment shown in the film had not yet been developed at the time the film is set: props - layout tiered vehicles stylized as German tanks PzKpfw IVH, which appeared a year later than the action of the film - in 1943, and Soviet tanks T-34-85, which appeared only in 1944. The film received corresponding ratings from critics.

== See also ==
- Cinema of Russia
