= Family Happiness (film) =

- Russian poster
- Russian: Семейное счастье
- Directed by: Andrey Ladynin; Aleksandr Sheyn Sr.; Sergey Solovev
- Written by: Anton Chekhov; Andrey Ladynin; Sergey Solovev; Arkadi Stavitsky
- Based on: Novels: "From nothing to do", "Nerves", "The Avenger", "The Offer"
- Starring: Alisa Freyndlikh; Vyacheslav Tikhonov; Nikolay Burlyaev; Andrey Mironov; Valentin Gaft; Tatyana Vasileva
- Cinematography: Vladimir Chukhnov; Aleksandr Ryabov; Roman Veseler; Alfredo Álvarez
- Edited by: Klavdiya Moskvina
- Music by: Isaac Schwarts
- Production company: Mosfilm
- Release date: 1969
- Running time: 84 minute
- Country: Soviet Union
- Language: Russian

Family Happiness (Russian: Семейное счастье) is a 1969 Soviet comedy film-almanac directed by Andrey Ladynin, Aleksandr Sheyn Sr. and Sergey Solovev.

== Plot ==
The film consists of four short stories. The first short story tells about a bored mistress who falls in love with the tutor of her children. The second short story tells of a married man, frightened by stories of various mystical phenomena, who spends the night with a governess. In the third story, a man catches his wife with her lover and he decides to kill her for it. And suddenly he begins to guess about the possible punishment for this crime. The fourth short story shows the matchmaking of the landowner Lomov to the daughter of his neighbor.

== Cast ==
- Alisa Freindlikh as Anna Kapitonova
- Vyacheslav Tikhonov as Kapitonov
- Nikolay Burlyaev as grammar-school boy Schupaltsev
- Andrey Mironov as Fyodor Sigaev
- Valentin Gaft as Salesman
- Tatyana Vasileva as Chubakov's daughter
- Alla Budnitskaya as Sigaev's wife
- Georgy Burkov as landowner Lomov
- Nikolai Gritsenko as Vaksin
- Raisa Kurkina as Vaksin's wife
