= Kind Men =

- Russian: Добряки
- Directed by: Karen Shakhnazarov
- Written by: Leonid Zorin
- Produced by: Vladimir Klimenko
- Starring: Georgy Burkov; Tatyana Vasileva; Nikolay Volkov; Vladimir Zeldin; Viktor Sharlakhov
- Cinematography: Vladimir Shevtsik
- Edited by: Tamara Belyayeva
- Music by: Mark Minkov
- Production company: Mosfilm
- Release date: 1979
- Running time: 77 min.
- Country: Soviet Union
- Language: Russian

Kind Men (Russian: Добряки, romanized: Dobryaki) is a 1979 Soviet comedy film directed by Karen Shakhnazarov.

== Plot ==
The film tells about a swindler who went to the world of science and achieved success in it. Having settled in the Institute of Ancient Culture, he easily cheated all kinds of members of the academic council, defended his dissertation and became director.

== Cast ==
- Georgy Burkov as Gordey Petrovich Kabachkov
- Tatyana Vasileva as Iraida Yaroslavna
- Nikolay Volkov Sr. as Yaroslav Borisovich Grebeshkov
- Vladimir Zeldin as Yevgeny Vitaliev
- Viktor Sharlakhov as Arkady Anyutin
- Larisa Pashkova as Sychova
- Yuri Leonidov as Philip Kolesnitsyn
- Aleksandr Safronov as Lozhkin
- Valentina Telichkina as Nadezhda Pavlovna, Grebeshkov's secretary, Kabachkov's former lover
- Yuri Gusev as Mitrofan Tikhodonsky
- Veronika Izotova as Kabachkov's secretary
- Valentin Nikulin as Orest Ivanovich Muzhesky
