= Nikolai Burlyayev =

Russian film director and actor

Nikolai Burlyayev MP
- Николай Бурляев
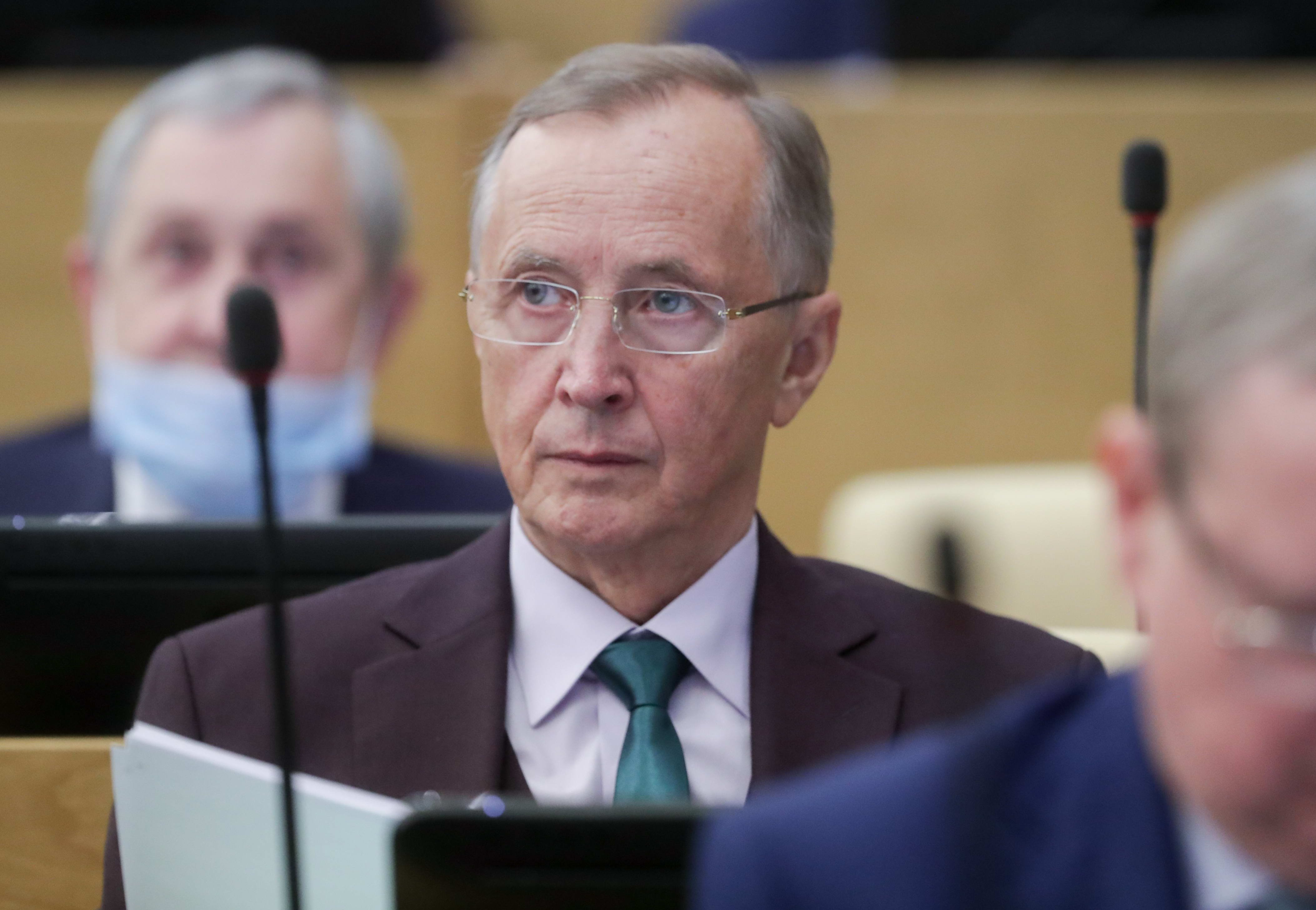
- Burlyayev in 2021

Member of the State Duma (Party List Seat)
- Incumbent
- Assumed office 12 October 2021

Personal details
- Born: 3 August 1946 (age 79) Moscow, RSFSR, USSR
- Party: A Just Russia - For Truth
- Spouses: Natalya Varley (divorced); Natalya Bondarchuk (divorced); Inga Shatova
- Children: 5 (Ivan; Maria; Georgy; Ilya; Daria)
- Parents: Pyotr Diomidovich Burlyayev (father); Tatyana Aleksandrovna Mikhailova (mother)
- Education: Boris Shchukin Theatre Institute; All-Union State Institute of Cinematography
- Occupation: actor; director
- Religion: Russian Orthodox
- Nikolay Burlayev's voice Recorded 20 October 2009

Nikolai Petrovich Burlyayev (Note: Also transliterated as Nikolay Burlyaev.) (Russian: Николай Петрович Бурляев; born 3 August 1946) is a Soviet and Russian actor, film director and politician from Moscow. Born into a family of actors, Burlyayev started his career in film and theatre when he was still a child. He is best known for his title role in Andrei Tarkovsky's Ivan's Childhood. He worked with Tarkovsky again four years later, as Boriska in Andrei Rublev.

He was elected to the State Duma in the 2021 parliamentary elections.

== Biography ==
Burlyayev majored in acting at the Shchukin theater school in Moscow, graduating in 1967. Burlyayev is a graduate of the Film Directors’ Faculty of VGIK, where he studied under Mikhail Romm and Lev Kulidzhanov. He graduated in 1975. Burlyayev's film acting debut was the lead in Andrei Konchalovsky's short film The Boy and the Dove (1960). Burliaev played the teacher with a gambling habit Aleksei Ivanovich in Aleksei Batalov's screen version of Dostoevsky's The Gambler (1972) and Evgeni in Mikhail Shveitser's Little Tragedies (1979, TV, from Aleksandr Pushkin). He also played supporting parts in Petr Todorovski's Frontline Romance (1983) and in Natalia Bondarchuk's dilogy Bambi's Childhood (1985) and Bambi’s Youth (1986). His later films include Wartime Romance (1983) and Lermontov (1986), where he played the lead.

Since 1991, Burlyayev has been the founder and director of the annual Zolotoi Vityaz (Golden Knight) Moscow Film Festival of Slavic and Orthodox Peoples, and since 1996 he has been the founder and chairman of the International Association of Cinematographers of Slavic and Orthodox Peoples.

In March 2014, he signed a letter in support of the position of the President of Russia Vladimir Putin on Russia's military intervention in Ukraine. Burlyayev emphasizes that he is Orthodox, repeatedly sharply expressed his negative attitude towards people with non-traditional sexual orientation, calls himself a homophobe.

He was married to Natalya Bondarchuk, and is thus the son-in-law of Sergei Bondarchuk and Inna Makarova.

=== Sanctions ===
He was sanctioned by the UK government in 2022 in relation to the Russo-Ukrainian War.

On 24 March 2022, the United States Treasury sanctioned him in response to the 2022 Russian invasion of Ukraine.

== Filmography ==
- 1961: The Boy and the Dove as Boy
- 1961: Judgment of the Mad as Sam Hagger
- 1962: Ivan's Childhood as Ivan
- 1962: No Fear, No Blame as Yura Sorokin
- 1963: Introduction to Life as Oleg
- 1964: The Blizzard as Lancer
- 1966: Hero of Our Time as Blind man
- 1966: Andrei Rublev as Boriska
- 1966: Boy & Girl as Boy
- 1968: Two Comrades Were Serving as Sergei Lukashevich
- 1969: Mama Married as Boris Golubev
- 1969: Family Happiness as Ivan Shchupaltsev
- 1969: Not Under the Jurisdiction as Seryozha's voice (role played by Vladimir Kuznetsov)
- 1971: Telegram as Gleb, Zina's son
- 1974: Under en steinhimmel as Lyosha Vasilyev
- 1974: Take Aim as Fedya
- 1974: Ivan and Marya as Marquis
- 1979: A Few Days from the Life of I. I. Oblomov as Olga's visitor
- 1979: Little Tragedies as Alber, young baron
- 1983: Wartime Romance as Aleksandr Netuzhilin
- 1984: Another Man's Wife and a Husband Under the Bed as Tvorogov
- 1985: Trial on the Road as Young policeman (filmed in 1970)
- 1985: Bambi's Childhood as Adolescent Bambi
- 1986: Lermontov as Mikhail Lermontov/Nikolai Gogol (also director)
- 1994: The Master and Margarita as Yeshua Ha-Notsri
- 1995: What a Wonderful Game as Mikhail Mikhailovich
- 2008: Admiral as Nicholas II of Russia
