= Air Crew =

1979 film by Alexander Mitta

- International poster from 1980
- Directed by: Alexander Mitta
- Written by: Yuli Dunsky; Valeri Frid; Alexander Mitta; Boris Urinovsky
- Produced by: Mosfilm
- Starring: Georgiy Zhzhonov; Leonid Filatov; Aleksandra Yakovleva; Yekaterina Vasilyeva; Anatoly Vasilyev
- Cinematography: Valeri Shuvalov
- Edited by: Nadezhda Veselyovskaya
- Music by: Alfred Schnittke
- Production company: Mosfilm
- Release date: May 12, 1980
- Running time: 144 minutes
- Country: Soviet Union
- Language: Russian

Air Crew (Russian: «Экипаж», romanized: Ekipazh, lit. 'crew') is a 1980 disaster film directed by Alexander Mitta. Inspired by the Airport film, it was the first disaster film shot in the Soviet Union.

== Plot ==
The first part of the film concentrates on the personal lives of the air crew, including their problems and relationships. For family reasons, one of the pilots has had to give up a promising career for a much less ambitious one. Despite this, his wife senses that he is not happy, which makes her a conflicted and angry spouse. Although both of them love their son, it is not enough to prevent them from divorcing. Subsequently, the pilot resumes his career piloting the large passenger planes he had been hankering after. One of his pilot colleagues does not believe in family at all – his flat is full of impressive self-constructed light effects and son et lumière equipment that he uses to impress the parade of women he has one-night stands with.

The action-filled second half of the film sees the Tu-154 Aeroflot airplane landing in the fictional foreign town of Bidri, which appears to be located somewhere in a mountain region of Asia. Soon after, an earthquake destroys the city, and the damaged runway is no longer suitable for normal take-offs (another plane – a Boeing – is shown crashing in the attempt). Still, there is no alternative to escaping by air, because the airport will soon be buried by an approaching mudflow. The experienced senior officer decides to take advantage of the fact that the airport was built on a mountain, so the plane will be able to descend rather than ascend as soon as it leaves the runway. Despite the "not ready for flight" warning lighting up on the dashboard, the plane successfully takes off at the last moment. The captain had first insisted on going through a speedy but complete take-off protocol, involving a check of the aircraft in accordance with the prescribed rules – perhaps in order to calm the crew by having them perform their normal tasks.

During its take-off run next to the mudflow, the plane receives some serious damage when a runway light gets jammed in the elevators and a crack appears near the tail section.

The two aforementioned pilots volunteer to repair the plane's tail and rudder. They come back inside the plane with severe injuries, and are covered with frost. This causes panic on board, but once again the captain manages to calm the situation, even asking one of the stewardesses to serve coffee as normal.

During their landing in Moscow, the crew discovers that the brakes are functioning too poorly to stop the plane in the heavy rain. The captain orders his crew to turn on the thrust reversal equipment, an action that rips off the tail and sends it up in flames. However, the rest of the plane stays intact, and all the people on board safely escape.

When he is examined ahead of his next medical certification, the superannuated captain is refused permission to fly because of some heart problems. He is greatly upset at this, and does not demonstrate the same coolness and self-control that he had exhibited when in charge of the plane in which he crash-landed. All three of the main protagonists (the captain and the other two pilots) are depicted as being capable of behaving much more maturely under the pressure of an emergency than in everyday life.

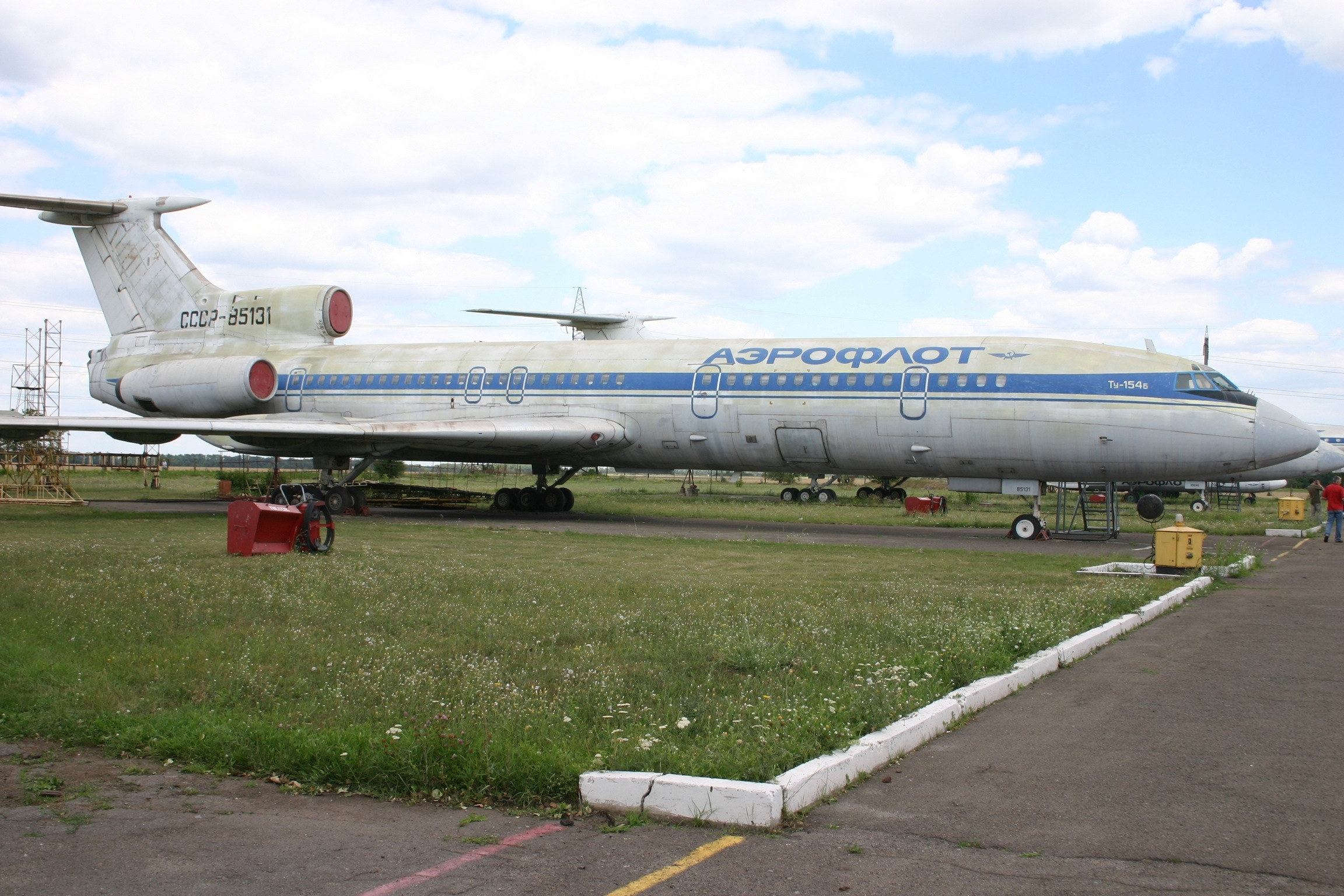
Tu-154B, registration CCCP-85131, which appeared in the film (photographed in 2007)

== Cast ==
- Georgiy Zhzhonov – Andrei Vasilyevich Timchenko, commander of the crew
- Anatoly Vasilyev – Valentin Georgievich Nenarokov, co-pilot
- Leonid Filatov – Igor Skvortsov, flight engineer
- Aleksandra Yakovleva – Tamara, stewardess, Skvortsov's fiancée
- Irina Akulova – Alevtina, wife of Nenarokov
- Yekaterina Vasilyeva – Anna, wife of Timchenko
- Yuri Gorobets – Misha, dispatcher (before decommissioning to the ground – co-pilot)
- Alexander Pavlov – navigator
- Galina Gladkova – Natasha, the daughter of Timchenko
- Roma Monin – Alik, son of Nenarokov (voiced by Klara Rumyanova)
- Komaki Kurihara – Kumiko Morimitsu, hostage from Boeing 727 of JAT airline
- Yelena Koreneva – Nona, Skovrtsov's former mistress
- Yuri Gusev – participant of the meeting on aircraft rescue
- Vladimir Ivanov – surgeon
- Gennady Matveyev – helicopter pilot, partner of Nenarokov
- Nikolay Smorchkov – policeman at the airport
- Alexey Yakubov – Kostya, father Natalia's child

== Reception ==
It was watched by more than 70 million viewers, mostly throughout the Eastern Bloc where it won several awards.

== See also ==
- Flight Crew – a Russian film remake of Air Crew
