= Semyon Vasilyevich Konovalov =

Soviet tank commander and WWII veteran (1921-1989)

- Семен Васильевич Коновалов

Personal details
- Born: February 15, 1921 Village of Yambulatovo (now Verkhneuslonsky District)
- Died: 4 April 1989 (68 years old) Kazan, Tatarstan (now part of Russia)
- Resting place: Arsk cemetery, Kazan
- Awards: Hero of the Soviet Union "Gold Star" (1943)[7]; Order of Lenin (1943); Patriotic Victory Medal, 1st class (in 1985); Order of the Defense of Stalingrad

Military service
- Years of service: 1939-1956
- Rank: Lieutenant Colonel
- Battles/wars: The Great Patriotic War

Semyon Vasilyevich Konovalov (Russian: Семен Васильевич Коновалов) (15 February 1921 – 4 April 1989) was a Soviet tank commander and WWII veteran. On 13 July 1942, during the Voronezh-Voroshilovgrad campaign, in a single battle, he commanded his KV-1 tank crew to destroy a total of 16 Nazi tanks and self-propelled guns.

== Biography ==
=== Origin ===
Semyon was born on 15 February 1921 into a peasant family in the village of Yambulatovo in the Sviyazhsky region of the Tatarstan Autonomous Soviet Republic. Before the war, Konovalov was educated in high school. He then worked at the post office before joining the Red Army in 1939.

According to some documents, he is Russian, others say he is a Chuvash. Many modern researchers favor the latter hypothesis.

=== Service ===
In the summer of 1941, after graduating from the Kuibyshev Infantry School with the rank of lieutenant, he was transferred to the front as a tank platoon commander in an independent tank company of the 125th Border Guard Rifle Division, stationed in Lithuania. His squadron was armed with high-speed BT-7 tanks, but was inferior to German tanks in both armor and armament. During the fierce battles, in August 1941, Konovalov was seriously wounded and taken to the rear hospital in Vologda. At the end of October, Konovalov recovered and was sent to a training center in Arkhangelsk to work as a trainer. Despite this, Konovalov regularly sent his achievements back to the front, saying that he did not belong there, and wanted to fight the Nazis. In April 1942, he received the permission to go to the front, and was transferred to the battlefield, this time serving as the commander of a platoon of the Kliment Voroshilov heavy tanks of the 5th Guards Tank Brigade. In June 1942, he was transferred to a similar position in the 15th Tank Brigade of the 9th Army.

=== Notable battles ===
==== Facing a Panzer division alone; 13th July 1942 ====
In mid-July 1942, the German 14th and 22nd Panzer Divisions completed a deep penetration breakthrough, encircling the 9th and 38th Armies and part of the Soviet 24th Army. The Germans attempted to destroy the encircled Soviet groups, and then developed an offensive in the direction of Stalingrad and the Caucasus. In those fierce battles, the 15th Tank Brigade had to constantly fight dense defensive battles. By 13 July, Lieutenant Konovalov's platoon was left with only one KV-1 tank under his own command, which itself had suffered extensive damage through the battles.

By the morning of 13 July, with the crew's combined efforts (including Commander Konovalov, main driver Kozyrentsev, co-pilot Cherevinsky, gunner Akinin, gunner Gerasimchuk and radio operator Dementyev) the tank was back in service condition. At that time, the 15th Tank Brigade received orders to move to a new defensive line to block the German advance. However, when it reached the area near the Nizhnemityakin farm in the Tarasovsky district of the Rostov region, the tank malfunctioned due to a faulty fuel supply system. The brigade commander Pushkin decided that it was impossible to wait for Konovalov's crew, as this jeopardized the completion of combat missions. The brigade continued to move, leaving the KV-1 tank to repair itself with the assistance of technician Serebryakov.

To the crew's relief, the tank was revived. However, as they prepared to move out, two German armored reconnaissance vehicles appeared. Neither side expected to see the other, and in the heat of the moment Konovalov's crew was able to fire first and destroy one of the vehicles. The second vehicle was able to escape, which meant the main German force would soon arrive. Konovalov decided to lay an ambush, he ordered the vehicle into a ravine in a position where majority of the hull was shielded. After a short wait, a column of 75 Panzers appeared, moving towards the village of Nizhnemityakin. Konovalov waited for the Panzers to approach within 500-600 meters range. Taken by surprise, the column quickly lost 4 Panzers.

Believing they were the victim of a large formation of Soviet tanks' ambush, the Germans quickly withdrew to reinforce, and shortly reappeared, this time with 55 tanks. The KV-1, still concealed, went on to take out another 6 tanks. The Germans, still unaware of the position of the Soviets, retreated once more. At the third attempt, the Germans realized they were being ambushed by a lone tank, and all firepower was focused on Konovalov's KV. Despite this, the Soviet crew managed to destroy 6 more tanks, an armored fighting vehicle and 8 troop trucks, before running out of ammunition and being shot down by anti-tank guns.

On 14 July, scouts ordered by the brigade commander Pushkin discovered the remains of the burnt KV-1, along with the bodies of several crew members and the destroyed German units. According to reconnaissance reports, in total, Konovalov's crew eliminated 16 tanks, 2 armored vehicles and 8 German troop trucks in the battle of 13 July 1942. Believing the crew to be dead and based on the achievements verified and reported by the scouts, Colonel Pushkin proposed to posthumously award Lieutenant Konovalov the title of Hero of the Soviet Union.

However, after the tank caught fire, Konovalov and his surviving comrades had managed to escape through the tank's bottom hatch. On their fourth day en route to the unit, they encountered a crew of Panzer IV tanks who were stopping to rest. The Soviets eliminated the German crew, captured the tank and returned to the Soviets without being mistakenly shot at by friendly forces. Having been separated too far from the formation of the 15th tank brigade, Konovalov and his comrades were enrolled in another tank unit.

==== Fighting aboard the captured Panzer ====
The German encirclement near Millerovo was quite thin, allowing the 9th Army to partially break through the encirclement. During the three-month battle to break through the encirclement, Lieutenant Konovalov's crew fought on the captured Panzer IV. To avoid confusion, a red star was painted on the turret. During this time, his crew is credited with eliminating four more German tanks, damaging many others and destroying five German anti-tank guns.

==== Return to the previous unit ====
It wasn't until 4 November 1942, that Konovalov was again wounded. At this time, his old unit received news that he was still alive. On 31 March 1943, according to the decree of the Presidium of the Supreme Soviet of the USSR, Semyon Vasilyevich Konovalov was awarded the title of Hero of the Soviet Union, the Order of Lenin and the Order of the Gold Star (No. 1019). After receiving the reward, Konovalov took a leave of absence to share his life with his mother. When he got home and knocked on the door, his mother burst into tears and said, "Go away! My Semyon has died, this is his death notice... ".

After returning home for a few days, he returned to the front.

Konovalov went through the battles of Stalingrad, Kursk, Donbass operation (1941), Rostov defensive (1941) and offensive (1942) operations, in the battle for the Caucasus (1942–43) and ended his service in the war in Germany as the commander of a tank battalion.

=== Post-war ===
In 1946, Konovalov was transferred to the reserve ranks, and in 1950 he was again commissioned into the Soviet Army. In 1952, he graduated from the Leningrad Senior Officers' Armored School. Since 1956, he has been a lieutenant colonel in the reserves, and later discharged. After his discharge, he lived in the city of Kazan and worked in an electronics factory.

He died on 4 April 1989 and was buried in Kazan, at the Arsk cemetery He was the last person alive in the crew of 13 July 1942. All remaining members were either killed in action or went missing throughout the war.

== Awards ==
- Hero of the Soviet Union Gold Star (1943)
- Order of Lenin (1943)
- Order of the Red Banner (1943)
- Order of the Patriotic War First-Class (1985)
- Defense of Stalingrad Medal

== Crew members ==
- Semyon Vasilyevich Konovalov, Lieutenant; tank commander, survived the battle of 13 July. Received Hero of the Soviet Union (1943), Order of Lenin (1943), Order of the Red Banner (1943), Order of the Patriotic War 1st Class (1985) and Medal "For the Defense of Stalingrad". Died in 1989.
- Pavel Ivanovich Kozyrentsev, Sergeant; lead driver. Survived the battle on 13 July, 1942. Awarded the Order of the Patriotic War 1st Class. Disappeared in November 1943.
- Ivan Adamovich Cherevinsky, Sergeant; co-driver. Died in battle on 13 July 1942. Posthumously awarded Order of the Red Star.
- Kirill Gavrilovich Akinin, Sergeant; machine gunner. Died in battle on 13 July 1942. Posthumously awarded Order of the Red Star.
- Yakov Antonovich Gerasimchuk, Sergeant; main gunner. Survived the battle on 13 July 1942. Awarded the Order of Lenin. Disappeared in June 1944.
- Dementyev (full name, rank and award unknown); radio operator. Died in battle on 13 July 1942.
- Mikhail Sergeyevich Serebryakov, Military Technician Class 2 (equivalent to Technical Lieutenant); technician. Survived the battle on 13 July 1942, died on 1 May 1943. Reward information is unknown.

== Memorials ==
- In 2005, the 2nd Vladimirskaya Street in Kazan was renamed in honor of tank hero Semyon Konovalov.
- In December 2019, a memorial plaque was installed on the façade of a house on Kirpichnikov Street, 15 in Kazan, where Semyon Konovalov lived from 1961 to 1989.
- In Kazan Victory Park, the nameplate of Semyon Vasilyevich Konovalov was installed.

== Pop culture and literature ==
- The main character of the movie Indestructible (Russian: Несокрушимый, romanized: Nesokrushimyy), often named as Tankers (Russian: Танкисты, romanized: Tankisty) is based on Semyon Konovalov.
- Герои Советского Союза: Краткий биографический словарь / Пред. ред. коллегии И. Н. Шкадов. — М.: Воениздат, 1987. — Т. 1 /Абаев — Любичев/. — 911 с. — 100 000 экз. — ISBN отс., Рег. No в РКП 87-95382.
- А. Докучаев. Танковые асы. Кто они? // Техника и оружие. — 1995. — No 03—04.
- http://www.raketchik.ru/geroi.php Саратовское высшее командно-инженерное Краснознаменное ордена Красной Звезды училище имени Героя Советского Союза генерал-майора А.И. Лизюкова.
- Андрей Сидорчик (2015-05-20). http://www.aif.ru/society/history/krepost_po_imeni_kv_kak_tankist_konovalov_ostanovil_nemeckuyu_armiyu. Аргументы и факты.
- Александра Дорфман. Забытый герой. Как боец выстоял против колонны врага и угнал немецкий танк // Аргументы и факты. — 2017. — No 7 от 14 февраля.
- Илья Щёголев (2015-03-30). https://rg.ru/2015/03/30/konovalov-site.html. Российская газета.
- https://zen.yandex.ru/media/dighistory/vosstavshii-iz-mertvyh-krasnoarmeec-ugnal-tank-i-poluchil-nagradu-geroia-sssr-5ab9e549fd96b184e20d3a32

== See also ==
- Zinoviy Gregoryevich Kolobanov
- Kliment Voroshilov
