= It Is Not Evening Yet =

- Russian: Ещё не вечер
- Directed by: Nikolai Rozantsev
- Written by: Maya Ganina
- Starring: Inna Makarova; Kirill Lavrov; Rita Gladunko; Galina Galchenko; Rimma Markova
- Cinematography: Aleksandr Chechulin
- Music by: Boris Tishchenko
- Release date: 1974
- Running time: 86 minute
- Country: Soviet Union
- Language: Russian

It Is Not Evening Yet (Russian: Ещё не вечер) is a 1974 Soviet drama film directed by Nikolai Rozantsev.

The film tells about a girl who went to the factory and worked there all her life.

== Plot ==
As a 15-year-old during the Great Patriotic War, Inna Kovalyova began working at a factory, which would become central to her life. Inna eventually agrees to take on the role of section foreman, facing the difficult task of building trust and cooperation within her team after issues with the previous foreman. Her challenges are compounded when one friend of 30 years is dismissed for alcoholism, and another transfers to a different section after a conflict. Inna’s direct supervisor, Andrey Pavlov—a widower with an adult daughter who once courted her in their youth—rekindles his interest, yet Inna feels no true connection to her husband, who spends his days playing dominoes and watching football. Through tremendous effort, Inna succeeds in creating a sense of shared purpose within her team, with former colleagues Tamara and Zinaida eventually returning.

Just as the team unites, management announces that they will be transferred early to a new workshop far from the main entrance. However, those who wish can remain in the old workshop, though they will be reassigned to work with different people. Now, each team member must decide whether to stay in the familiar space or join the team in the new location, facing the impact of their individual choices.

== Cast ==
- Inna Makarova as Inna Kovalyova
- Kirill Lavrov as Andrey Pavlov
- Rita Gladunko as Tamara Shevyakova
- Galina Galchenko as Sveta Pavlova
- Rimma Markova as Zinaida Voronina
- Olga Markina as Aleksandra Zhigalkina
- Lyubov Malinovskaya as Polya
- Anna Tveleneva as Lyuba (as Anna Tvelenyova)
- Larisa Burkova as Valya
- Liliya Gurova as Klava Semykina
