= You and Me (1971 film) =

- Russian: Ты и я
- Directed by: Larisa Shepitko
- Written by: Gennady Shpalikov; Larisa Shepitko
- Produced by: L. Kushelevich; Valentin Maslov
- Starring: Leonid Dyachkov; Yuri Vizbor; Alla Demidova; Natalya Bondarchuk; Leonid Markov; Vladimir Nosik
- Cinematography: Alexander Knyazhinsky
- Edited by: Valeriya Belova; L. Lysenkova
- Music by: Alfred Schnittke
- Production company: Mosfilm
- Release date: 1971
- Running time: 97 min.
- Country: Soviet Union
- Language: Russian

You and Me (Russian: Ты и я, romanized: Ty i ya) is a 1971 Soviet drama film directed by Larisa Shepitko.

The film tells about two doctors who have not abandoned their research work. One of them realized that he had done wrong and decided to change his life.

== Plot ==
Having come close to a groundbreaking discovery in neurosurgery, the protagonist, Pyotr, decides to abandon his scientific work, his colleague in the experiment, and his best friend, leaving to work as a doctor at an embassy in Sweden.

Several years later, dissatisfaction with his job drives him back to Moscow. However, he finds no warm welcome—he is not accepted back into the scientific community, and his best friend refuses to help him despite pleas of Pyotr's wife. Following this rejection, he moves to Siberia. Through various encounters with different people, he gains the courage to overcome his struggles and ultimately returns to his once-abandoned scientific work.

== Cast ==
- Leonid Dyachkov as Pyotr
- Yuri Vizbor as Sasha
- Alla Demidova as Katya
- Natalya Bondarchuk as Nadya
- Leonid Markov as Sergey
- Vladimir Nosik as Kolka
- Oleg Yefremov as Oleg Pavlovich
- Aleksandr Shirvindt as Sasha's friend
- Natalya Shvets as patient
- Aleksandr Yanvaryov as Valka
- Anatoli Firsov as cameo
