= Ladies' Tango =

- Russian: Дамское танго
- Directed by: Sulambek Mamilov
- Written by: Valeri Chikov
- Starring: Valentina Fedotova; Anatoly Vasilyev; Raisa Ryazanova; Leonid Nevedomsky; Nikolay Kryuchkov
- Cinematography: Gasan Tutunov
- Music by: Viktor Rafaelov
- Release date: 1983
- Running time: 83 minute
- Country: Soviet Union
- Language: Russian

Ladies' Tango (Russian: Дамское танго) is a 1983 Soviet romantic drama film directed by Sulambek Mamilov.

== Plot ==
The film tells about a woman named Valentina, who after her son's wedding went to the village and met there with the worker Fedor, whom she fell in love with. But Fedor, as it turned out, was married and had a daughter.

== Cast ==
- Valentina Fedotova
- Anatoly Vasilyev
- Raisa Ryazanova
- Leonid Nevedomsky
- Nikolay Kryuchkov
- Mariya Skvortsova as Vlasyevna
- Boris Novikov
- Sergey Fyodorov
- Sergey Rubeko
- Yana Drouz
