= Olga Pogodina =

Russian actress

- Ольга Погодина
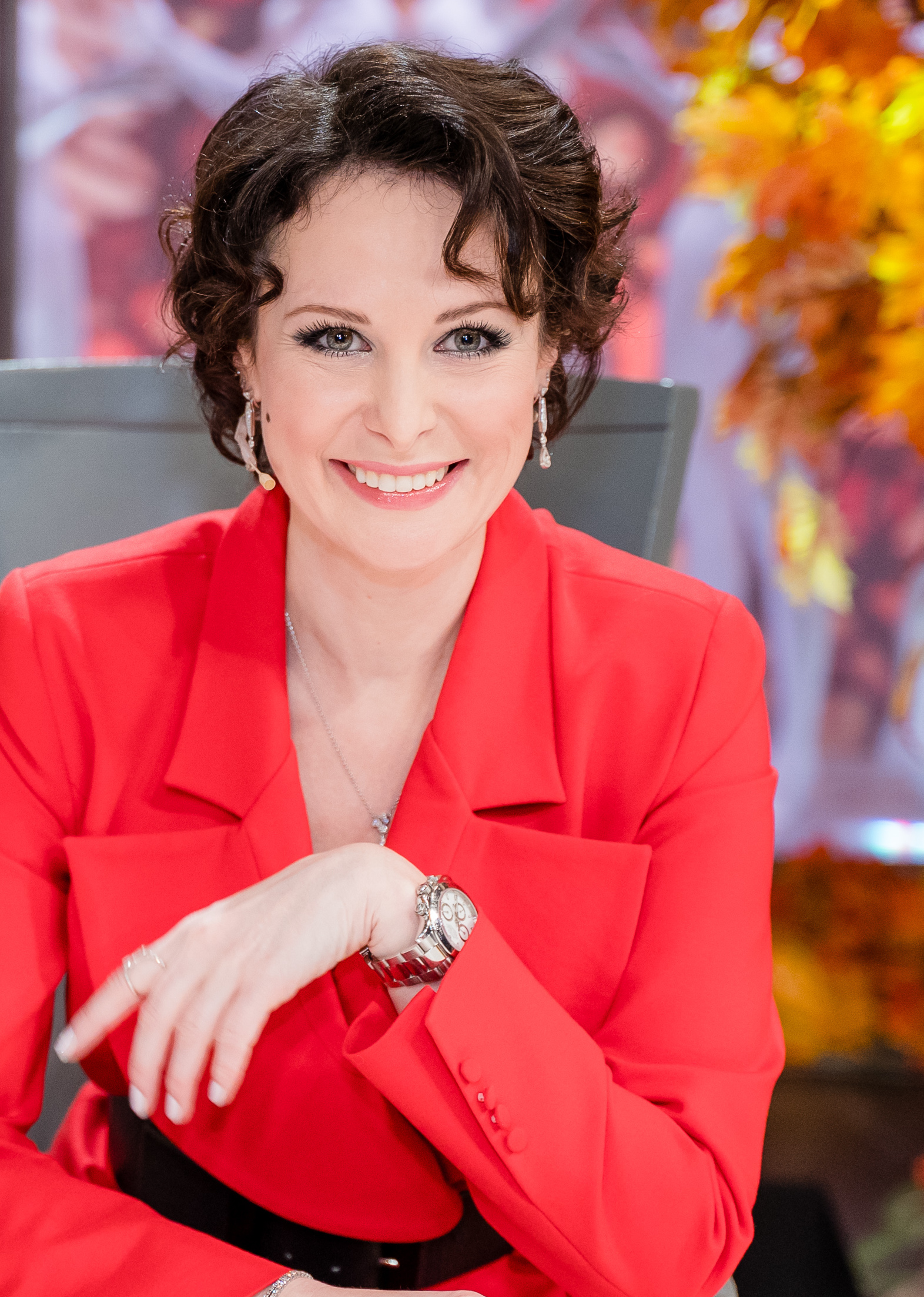
- Pogodina in 2018
- Born: Olga Stanislavovna Bobovich; 21 September 1976 (age 49); Moscow, Russian SFSR, Soviet Union
- Occupations: Actress; film producer; screenwriter; show host
- Years active: 1997–present
- Title: Merited Artist of Russia (2009), People's Artist of Russia (2017)
- Spouse: Aleksei Pimanov

Olga Stanislavovna Pogodina (Russian: О́льга Станисла́вовна Пого́дина; born 21 September 1976) is a Russian actress known for her work on several dozens of Russian TV series and movie pictures (including Russian-Italian films). She is also a film producer, screenwriter and show host.

She is a Merited Artist of the Russian Federation since 2009 and a People's Artist of Russia (highest Russian state title for artists) since 2017. Holds a number of Russian awards in Culture including Golden Eagle Award. Member of the Union of Cinematographers of the Russian Federation.

== Biography ==
Pogodina was born in Moscow, Soviet Union. Father is Stanislav Bobovich, a chief engineer at a factory, and the mother is Liya Pogodina, an actress.

Due to health problems in childhood, Olga could not attend secondary school normally, so her mother Liya had to give up actress career to maintain daughter's education at home for years. When finished, Olga received school graduation as external degree. At the age of 16, Olga decided to follow her mother's profession and went to Boris Shchukin Theatre Institute in Moscow.

The studies were hard for Olga: her leading teacher was set up against her considering her unsuitable for the profession. Every year the teacher, Marina Panteleeva, tried to drop her out of the institute, but the senior administration made her remain. Over the last year of studies, Panteleeva refused to involve Olga in graduation performances. Thus, as the only exception in the history of the Shchukin Institute, rehearsals with her were individually held by pro-rector Pyotr Popov and a teacher Vladimir Poglazov. Finally, in 1997 Olga successfully graduated with the highest marks.

Upon that, in 1998 she joined Moscow Theatre Center "Vishnevy Sad" headed by Honored Art-Worker of Russia Alexander Vilkin. For the role of Mariana in a play "Tartuffe" she was nominated to the award of the Union of Theatre Workers of the Russian Federation at the festival "Moscow's yearly debutes".

For many years, she collaborated with the theatre "Center for Drama and Directing" headed by Aleksei Kazantsev and Mikhail Roshchin. In 2006 she was a TV host at a social TV program called "Vremechko" at the channel TV Centre.

In 2007–2008 she also was a member of the Higher Council of the Russian political party "Civilian Power".

She is the creator, co-founder and the Director General of the JSC "ODA Film Production" in Moscow which produces cinematographic movies, TV movies and TV shows. As a film producer, Olga created more than 10 movies some of those earned Russia's main TEFI TV award and "Golden Eagle" movie award.

Olga Pogodina is a member of the professional Union of Cinematographers of the Russian Federation.

Since 2013 Olga is married to Aleksei Pimanov, a well-known Russian director, producer, TV host and a top manager at Russia's major TV company called Channel One Russia.

== Works ==
=== Theatre ===
Role of Mariana in "Tartuffe" at Moscow Theatre Center "Vishnevy Sad" (1998). At "Center for Drama and Directing": roles in "Set-2" (2001), "Polovoe Pokrytie" (2002), "Moscow is an open city" (2002), director Olga Subbotina.

=== TV series and movies ===
==== As actress ====
Over 80 roles (by 2020) at cinematographic movies, TV movies and TV series, including many leading roles. Among them are:

1. 2001 — movie "If your bride is a witch", dir. O. Fesenko — lead role Alisa Malkovich, Russia-1 (RTR)
2. 2001 — movie "Destiny crossroad", dir. S. Nikonenko — lead role Veronika, Channel One Russia (ORT)
3. 2001 — series "Beauty salon", dir. A. Polynnikov — lead role Zhenya, NTV
4. 2002 — series "Drongo", dir. Z. Roysman — secretary Lazareva, ORT
5. 2002 — series "Simple truths" — lead role Olga Borodina, chemistry teacher, RTR
6. 2002 — series "Line of defense", dir. L. Derbenev — role Clara, RTR
7. 2003 — movie "Golden age", dir. I. Hotinenko — role Countess Tolstaya, ORT
8. 2003 — series "Women's logic 2", dir. S. Ashkenazy — role Nina, the waitress, ORT
9. 2003 — series "Russian amazons", dir. I. Fridberg — role Elya, RTR
10. 2003 — movie "Ovid", dir. V. Lagunov — lead role Polina Astahova, the painter
11. 2003 — series "Taxi driver", dir. O. Muzaleva — role Ella, NTV
12. 2003 — movie "Woman's intuition", dir. O. Bayrak — lead role Dasha, Alexandr's beloved, Masha's nanny, RTR
13. 2003 — series "Five stars", dir. V. Konovalov — lead role Kristina Ignatova
14. 2003–2007 — series "My Prechistenka", dir. B. Tokarev — lead role Clara Duro, the actress, George Nadein's wife
15. 2004 — series "Road angel", dir. I. Ishmukhamedov — lead role Victoria, Sergei's mistress
16. 2004 — series "Firefighters", dir. I. Fridberg — lead role Elena, RTR
17. 2004 — series "Twins", dir. Z. Roysman — role Sonia Kadkova
18. 2004 — series "Jackpot for Cinderella", dir. N. Stambula — role Larisa
19. 2004 — series "Muhtar's Return" (episode 35 "Alibi"), dir. А. Polyshnikov — lead role Sasha and Lisa (twins), RTR
20. 2004 — movie "Kill me! Oh, please!", dir. O. Bayrak — lead role Valeria, Olympic champion in biathlon
21. 2004 — movie "Woman's intuition 2", dir. O. Bayrak — lead role Dasha, Alexandr's wife, Masha's stepmother
22. 2004 — series "The oddities of love", dir. М. Fatyanov — lead role Dunya, NTV
23. 2004 — movie "To you, real", dir. O. Bayrak — role Jessika, RTR
24. 2004 — movie "The bat", dir. O. Bayrak — role Ida, Adel's sister, Falk's beloved
25. 2004 — movie "Taxi driver. Greenwich New year", dir. О. Muzaleva — role Ella
26. 2005 — movie "Men's Season: The Velvet Revolution", dir. О. Stepchenko — role Office employee
27. 2005 — series "Echelon", dir. N. Adominayte — lead role Erna
28. 2005 — movie "A Girl from the North", dir. D. Mednov — Irena Bond-Bondareva
29. 2005 — series "Deadly Force 6" (episode 7 "Profitable groom"), dir. А. Karpilovskiy — role Zina Arkhipova
30. 2005 — series "To the rhythm of tango", dir. A.Pavlovskiy — lead role Olga Venevitova
31. 2005 — movie "Inner Circle - Bodyguard", dir. V. Furmanov — lead role Natalia Belkovskaya, businessman's widow
32. 2006 — movie "Make God laugh", dir. V. Kharchenko-Kulikovskiy — lead role Svetlana Golovanova, Stas's wife
33. 2006 — series "Good bye, doctor Chekhov!", dir. Е. Sokolov — lead role Olga Knipper
34. 2006 — series "Old-men crush, or Fantastic Four", dir. К. Smirnov — Violet, a journalist, lead role
35. 2006 — movie "Three days in Odessa", dir. А. Pimanov — lead role Lida Sheremetieva
36. 2006 — movie "Indigo children", dir. А. Mayorov, role Masha
37. 2006 — series "Angel escapee", dir. О.Subotina, role Masha
38. 2006 — series "Trap", dir. Vladimir Krasnopolsky — role Polina Krashevskaya
39. 2006 — series "Railworkers" (episode 7 "No coincidence meeting"), dir. G. Baysak — Zoya, lead role
40. 2006 — series "The limit of dreams", dir. V. Dmitrievskiy — role Elena Nesterenko
41. 2007–2011 — series "Alert the press!", dir. V. Opalev — lead role Victoria Danilova
42. 2008 — series "Legend of Olga", dir. К. Кapitca — lead role Olga Chekhova
43. 2008 — movie "Distance", dir. B. Tokarev — lead role Rita
44. 2009 — movie "A man in my head", dir. А. Pimanov — lead role Alyona
45. 2010 — series "Reflection", dir. А. Shurikhin — lead role Elisaveta Kruglova/Darya Eryomina
46. 2010 — movie "Marry a millionaire", dir. V. Uskov — role Irina
47. 2012 — movie "Entertainment", dir. R. Baltcer — lead role Nina
48. 2012 — movie "Night of the lone owl", dir. G. Salgarelly — lead role Anna
49. 2013 — series "Ludmila" dir. А. Pavlovskiy — role Anastassia
50. 2014 — Russian-Italian movie "Elementary love" / "Amori elementari", dir. S. Basso — lead role Vera
51. 2015 — series "Women's riot, or Novosyolkovo War", dir. U. Morozov — lead role Yulia
52. 2015 — Russian-Italian movie "Love prêt-à-porter" / "Di tutti e colori", dir. М. Nardari, — lead role Olga, a russian girl
53. 2015 — series "Vlasik. Stalin's shadow", dir. А. Muradov — lead role Asya Lemke
54. 2016 — series "Margarita Nazarova", dir. К. Maximov — lead role Margarita Nazarova
55. 2018 — movie "Tankers", dir. К. Maximov — lead role Paula, Semen Konovalov's wife
56. 2019 — series "The Legend Of Ferrari", dir. К. Maximov — Elena Ferrari

==== As producer ====
1. 2008 — series "Hate", dir. М. Shevchuk
2. 2008 — movie "Distance", dir. B. Tokarev
3. 2009 — movie "A man in my head", dir. А. Pimanov
4. 2012 — series "Reflection", dir. А. Shurikhin
5. 2012 — movie "Night of the lone owl", dir. G. Salgarelly
6. 2014 — series "Women's riot, or Novosyolkovo War", dir. U. Morozov
7. 2017 — Russian-Italian movie "Love prêt-à-porter" / "Di tutti e colori", dir. М. Nardari
8. 2016 — series "Margarita Nazarova", dir. К. Maximov
9. 2018 — movie "Tankers", dir. К. Maximov
10. 2019 — series "The Legend of Ferrari", dir. К. Maximov

=== Other ===
Olga has a record of hosting public events such as award ceremonies which include Nika Award, the main annual national film award in Russia, concerts of notable artists such as Yan Arlazorov. She also starred in over 20 television advertisements, which included an ad for Russian duty-free shop system.

== Awards and nominations ==
=== State titles ===
- 2009: Merited Artist of the Russian Federation (honorary title), for "merits in arts".
- 2017: People's Artist of Russia (honorary title), for "big merits in arts".

=== Cultural awards ===
- 1998: nomination to the award of the Union of Theatre Workers of the Russian Federation at the festival "Moscow's yearly debuts" for role in Tartuffe.
- 2005: Grand Prix of Eurasian Academy of Television and Radio's contest for the role in Echelon TV series.
- 2009: nomination at TEFI award for best actress for the role in "Legend of Olga".
- 2009: award for best actress for the role in "Goodbye, doctor Chekhov" at International Anton Chekhov Festival in Paris, France.
- 2010: insignia "Labor Valor" (Russia) from homonymous non-governmental organization.
- 2016: upon completion of the work on the role of Soviet circus artist Margarita Nazarova in the homonymous TV series, Olga Pogodina got a record in the "Book of Records of Russia". The achievement was: "for the shortest time of artist's preparation for a stunt of putting head into tiger's mouth" (4 days). The movie makers decided to re-create authentically the setting of Nazarova's circus performances, so the tigers had to get used to Olga personally, not stunt performers substituting her. Also the movie authors re-created water circus with tigers, which is especially dangerous as tigers in water may harm people unintentionally. Olga was working on her own there as well, and it was emphasized that there was the sole implementation of water circus with tigers since those times.
- 2017: Golden Eagle Award for Best Leading Actress on Television for the leading role of Margarita Nazarova in the homonymous 2016 TV series.

== Links ==
- Olga Pogodina at IMDb
