= Anatoly Vasilyev (actor) =

Soviet and Russian actor (born 1946)

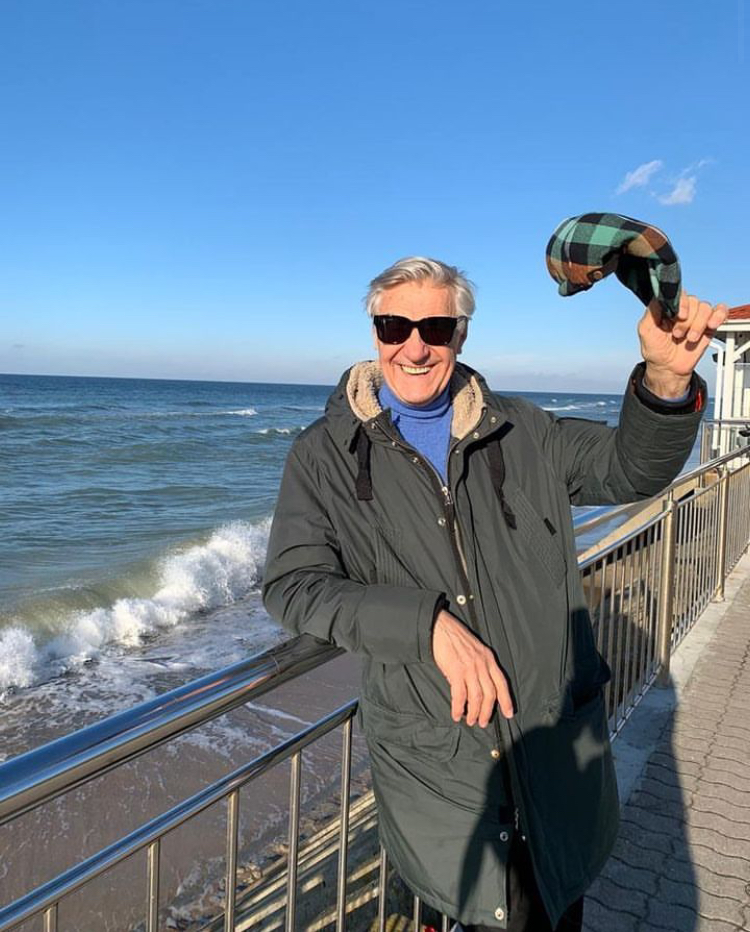
- Born: Anatoly Aleksandrovich Vasilyev; November 6, 1946 (age 79); Nizhny Tagil, RSFSR, USSR
- Education: Moscow Art Theatre School
- Occupation: Actor

Anatoly Aleksandrovich Vasilyev (Russian: Анато́лий Алекса́ндрович Васи́льев; born 1946) is a Soviet and Russian film and theater actor, People's Artist of Russia (1994).

== Biography ==
Anatoly Vasilyev was born November 6, 1946, in Nizhny Tagil. In 1969, Anatoly Vasilyev graduated from the Moscow Art Theatre School (course Vasily Markov). At the end of the school-studio has been accepted into the troupe Moscow Satire Theatre, where he served until 1973. In 1973 he moved to Russian Army Theatre. Since 1995 he has served as a Mossovet Theatre.

He acted in over 50 films (Scream Loons, The Case of General Shubnikov, Mikhailo Lomonosov, Waiting for Love, Ladie's Tango, I Want to — Fall in Love and others). The most famous roles — Air Crew and TV series Svaty.

== Personal life ==
- His first wife (1969–1983) — Tatyana Vasilyeva
  - Son of actor Philipp Vasilyev (1978)
  - Grandchildren Ivan and Grigory
- His second wife (1991) — Vera Vasilyeva
  - Daughter Varvara Vasileva (1992)

== Selected filmography ==
- 1978 — Ivantsov, Petrov, Sidorov as Vladik Yakovlev
- 1978 — Steppe as Dymov
- 1979 — Air Crew as Valentin Nenarokov, the co-pilot
- 1980 — The Сase of General Shubnikov as Major-General Nikolay Shubnikov
- 1981 — Waiting for Love as Slava, physician for the recruitment commission
- 1983 — Ladies' Tango as Fyodor
- 1986 — Boris Godunov as Pyotr Basmanov
- 1986 — Mikhailo Lomonosov as Vasily Dorofeyevich, Lomonosov's father
- 1997 — At the Dawn Misty Youth as Bashkirtsev
- 2001 — Lyubov.ru as Kalinin
- 2004 — Daddy as Ivan Kuzmich Chernyshov
- 2007 — Tatiana's Day as Oleg Barinov
- 2008 — Fathers and Sons as Nikolai Petrovich Kirsanov
- 2008-10 — Svaty as Yury Anatolievich Kovalev
- 2012 — The Military Prosecutor's Office as Sergey Smirnov
- 2013 — Owl Creek as Valentin Petrovich Bakur, The Count
