= No Fear, No Blame =

- Russian poster
- Russian: Без страха и упрёка
- Directed by: Aleksandr Mitta
- Written by: Semyon Lungin; Ilya Nusinov
- Starring: Alla Vitruk; Viktor Glazkov; Nikolay Burlyaev; Saveliy Kramarov; Nikolay Volkov
- Cinematography: German Shatrov
- Edited by: Esfir Tobak
- Music by: Nikita Bogoslovskiy
- Release date: 1962
- Country: Soviet Union
- Language: Russian

No Fear, No Blame (Russian: Без страха и упрёка) is a 1962 Soviet children's adventure film directed by Aleksandr Mitta.

== Plot ==
The film tells about the business trip Repnin, which is sent with the equipment to Moscow. Having shipped the equipment, he had to fly to the Bailout, but he lost all his money. Three kids find them and decide to go in search of the owner. The film uses the adventurous plot to espouse values like honesty and chivalry.

== Cast ==
- Alla Vitruk
- Viktor Glazkov
- Nikolay Burlyaev
- Saveliy Kramarov
- Nikolay Volkov
- Lev Zolotukhin
- Marina Strizhenova
- Lyudmila Marchenko
- Anatoli Yushko
- Yelena Maksimova
