= Pushkin: The Last Duel =

- Russian: Пушкин. Последняя дуэль
- Directed by: Natalya Bondarchuk
- Written by: Natalya Bondarchuk
- Produced by: Natalya Bondarchuk
- Starring: Sergey Bezrukov; Anna Snatkina; Yevgeny Stychkin
- Cinematography: Masha Solovyova
- Edited by: Alexander Hachko
- Music by: Ivan Burlyaev
- Production company: State Committee for Cinematography
- Release date: November 18, 2006
- Running time: 105 min.
- Country: Russia
- Language: Russian

Pushkin: The Last Duel (Russian: Пушкин. Последняя дуэль, romanized: Pushkin: Poslednyaya duel) is a 2006 Russian biographical drama film directed by Natalya Bondarchuk.

== Plot ==
January 27 at the Black River took place by Pushkin and d'Anthès, as a result of which Pushkin was killed. There was a conspiracy around the poet’s family, into which even his friends were drawn. Having learned about the contents of anonymous letters discrediting the name of Natalya Pushkina, the emperor saw in them slander against his family, and he instructs the head of the gendarmes of the secret search office Dubelt to figure this out.

== Cast ==
- Sergey Bezrukov as Alexander Pushkin
- Anna Snatkina as Natalia Pushkina
- Yevgeny Stychkin as Lermontov
- Andrey Ilyin as Konstantin Danzas
- Andrei Zibrov as Pyotr Vladimirovich Dolgorukov
- Yulian Makarov as Nicholas I of Russia
- Viktor Sukhorukov as Colonel Galakhov
- Boris Plotnikov as Leonty Dubelt
- Lyobov Povolotskaya as Mariya Nesselrode
- Natalya Bondarchuk as Ekaterina Andreevna Karamzina
- Roman Romantsov as Georges-Charles de Heeckeren d'Anthès
- Inna Makarova as Ekaterina Zagryazhskaya
- Sergey Nikonenko as Nikita Kozlov
- Svetlana Svirko as Vera Fyodorovna Vyazemskaya
