= Māris Liepa =

Latvian ballet dancer

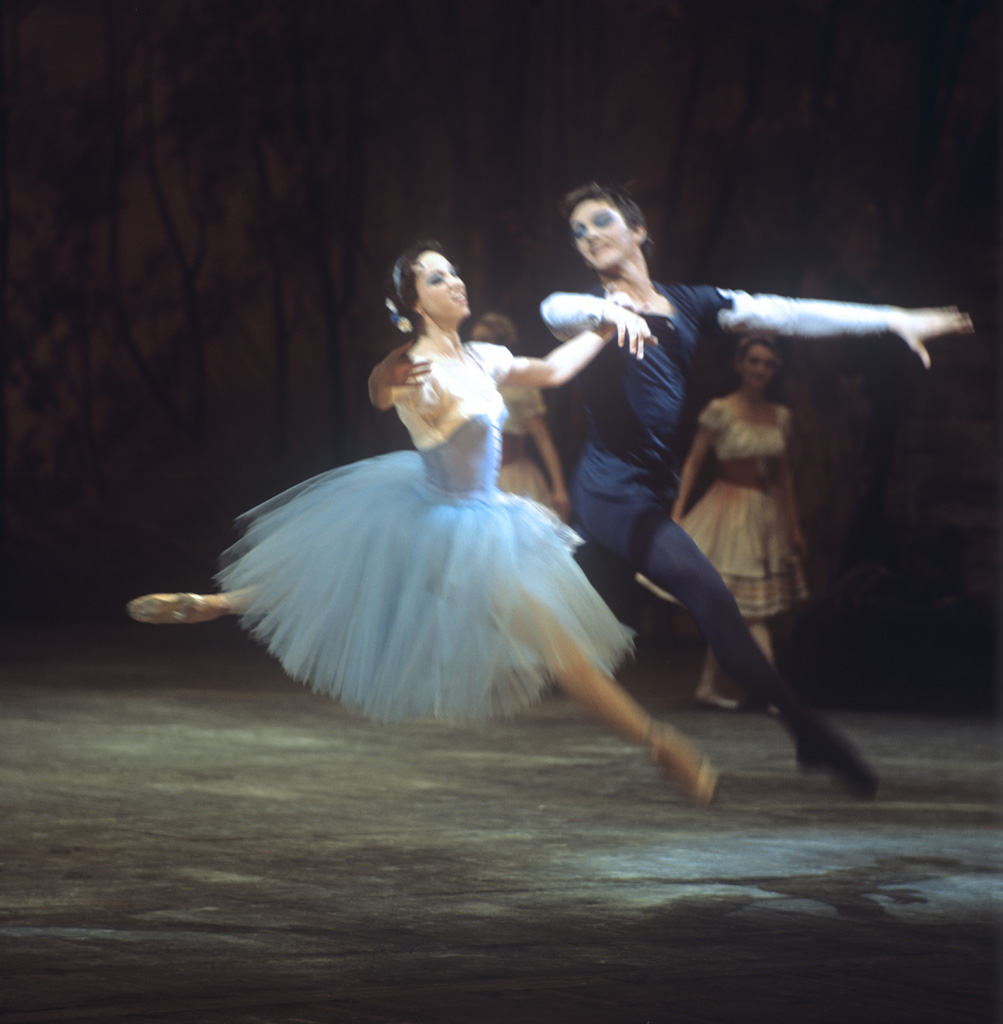
- Marina Kondratyeva as Giselle and Maris Liepa as Albrecht in a scene from Act 1 of Adolphe Charles Adam's ballet Giselle staged at the State Academic Bolshoi Theater of the USSR. 1 January 1972
- Born: Māris Rūdolfs Liepa; 27 July 1936; Riga, Latvia
- Died: 26 March 1989 (aged 52); Moscow, Soviet Union
- Resting place: Vagankovo Cemetery, Moscow
- Occupation: Dancer
- Employer(s): Latvian Opera and Ballet Theatre, Bolshoi Theatre
- Known for: Spartacus, Swan Lake
- Children: Andris Liepa and Ilze Liepa
- Awards: People's Artist of the USSR
- Website: http://liepa.ru/

Māris Rūdolfs Liepa (27 July 1936 – 26 March 1989) was a Soviet Latvian ballet dancer who was born in Riga and died in Moscow.

== Biography ==
He graduated from Riga Choreography School where he was taught by Valentin Blinov. He performed in Moscow for the first time in 1950. At the height of career, Liepa was considered one of the finest male dancers in the world and one of the most versatile, at home in a wide range of roles.

In 1953 Liepa began studies in Moscow Choreography School in a class taught by Nikolay Tarasov and initially was developing as character-role dancer, yet upon graduation transformed into a classic ballet dancer.

After graduation from Moscow Choreography School in 1955 he returned to Riga and the Latvian Opera and Ballet Theatre. The company of theatre went on road-show to Moscow during December of the same year, where Liepa was noticed by one of the Bolshoi's prima ballerinas, Maya Plisetskaya. She invited Liepa to join her ballet company on a tour in Budapest in 1956. He accepted the invitation to become a part of the Stanislavsky and Nemirovich-Danchenko Moscow Academic Music Theatre, and after four seasons he became one of the lead artists.

Liepa was invited to become a part of the Moscow State Academic Bolshoi Theatre troupe that toured Poland, and shortly after this tour Liepa was offered a place in the company by the Theatre's Ballet Master Leonid Lavrovsky. In his debut on the stage of the Moscow State Academic Bolshoi Theatre he performed Basil in Don Quixote, again with Maya Plisetskaya. In the early 1960s and shortly after he played the most crucial role of his career, Count Albert in a staging of Giselle. Collaboration with the new Ballet Master of the State Academic Bolshoi Theatre Yuri Grigorovich began in 1964. In 1966 Liepa had his first performance in a re-staging of Fokin's Le Spectre de la rose, and in 1968 he played a part in the new version of "Spartacus", and received the highest accolades for the role of Crassus in 1970.

The relationship of Liepa and the Ballet Master of the State Academic Bolshoi Theatre flattened during the 1970s and he remained off the list of performers of the new productions staged by Grigorovich. Liepa danced his last large role with the theater in 1977, in a staging of Chipollino. After leaving, he staged and organized several of his own creative performances and actively cooperated with the new ballet troupe of Boris Eifman.

Liepa resigned from the Bolshoi in 1982, but the end of his ballet and artistic career was to come much later. He worked as a ballet teacher and became the artistic director of Sofia National Opera between 1983 and 1985. In 1989 Liepa created his own ballet theatre in Moscow.

The repertoire of Liepa included many roles, from Swan Lake to Spartacus, and he performed on stages in both Europe and the United States. Liepa also played roles in movies and TV, in Hamlet and Spartacus. A book, I Want to Dance for a Hundred Years, written by Māris Liepa, was published in Riga in 1981. Liepa was a winner of many distinguished Soviet Union awards, prizes and bestowals, including the Konstsantin Stanislavski medal, Paris Ballet Academy Vaslav Nijinsky award and Marius Petipa Prize.

Latvian National Opera hosts the annual Māris Liepa memorial concerts that are organized by his children: his son Andris and daughters Ilze (ballet dancer) and Maria (actress and singer).

== Film and television ==
- 1977: Galatea
- 1985: Bambi's Childhood as Bambi's father
- 1986: Bambi's Youth as Bambi's father

== See also ==
- List of dancers
- List of Russian ballet dancers
