= Svaty =

Ukrainian television comedy series

- Poster of the seventh season
- Genre: Comedy
- Starring: Fyodor Dobronravov; Tatyana Kravchenko; Lyudmila Artemyeva; Anatoly Vasilyev (1–4 and musical); Aleksandr Feklistov (4–7); Ulyana Ivashchenko (1–2); Sofia Stetsenko (3–4 and musical); Anna Koshmal (5–7); Nikolai Dobrynin (3–7 and musical); Olesya Zheleznyak (4–7)
- Composers: Artyom Bobrovnik; Alexander Udovenko (1–3, 6 and the musical); Roman Dudchik (1–3); Dmitry Garbuz (5)
- Original language: Russian

Production
- Producers: Volodymyr Zelenskyy (1–6 and musical); Alexander Bogutsky (1); Boris Shephir (1–6 and musical); Sergey Shefir (1–6 and musical); Andrei Yakovlev (5–6 and musical); Sergey Sozanovsky (2–5)
- Running time: 50 minutes
- Production company: Kvartal 95 Studio

Original release
- Release: 28 December 2008 – 30 December 2021

Svaty (Ukrainian: «Свати»; Russian: «Сваты», lit. 'Matchmakers' or 'The In-Laws') is a Ukrainian, Russian-language comedy series from the production company Kvartal 95 Studio. In total, seven seasons were created, along with the musical Novogodniye Svaty ("New Year's In-Laws"). Also, a television program called Svaty u plity ("In-Laws at the Stove").

Premiere screenings of the series aired on the TV channels Russia-1 (Russia), ICTV (season 1), Inter (seasons 2–5), and 1+1 (seasons 6 and 7, Ukraine).

On 23 November 2017, featured actor Fyodor Dobronravov was banned from entering Ukraine for three years for publicly supporting the 2014 Russian annexation of Crimea. The series itself was banned for broadcast in Ukraine on 29 November 2017. In connection with the ban, the shooting of the seventh season was suspended. 1+1 filed a lawsuit against the Ministry of Culture over the ban on Svaty. The court suspended the ban. On 17 May 2018, the District Administrative Court of the city of Kyiv held the first court session, which began consideration of the case of Svaty. On 27 March 2019, this court revoked the ban.

In 2019, Svaty was criticised by the Experts' Commission of the Ukrainian State Film Agency (Derzhkino) for containing Ukrainophobic tropes and themes of "backwardness".

== Franchise of films and serials Svaty ==
=== Svaty (2008) ===
The young spouses Masha and Maxim Kovalev decide to go to Italy for a vacation and leave their five-year-old daughter Zhenya under the supervision of their parents, but they say they are too busy and refuse. As a result of confusion, both Masha's and Maxim's parents come to watch their granddaughter. Coming from absolutely opposite social sphere (Masha's parents – Valentina and Ivan Budko – are ordinary villagers, and Maxim's parents – Olga and Yuri Kovalyov – typical urban intellectuals with subtle manners), it turns out that they cannot stand each other. The four of them are in the same house, and they have a conflict of interests. Everyone has their own methods of upbringing. The battle for the attention of the granddaughter commences. The city-dwellers limit her in everything, and the rural couple allow many things. In-laws constantly fall into ridiculous situations, the way out of which they have to find together, which brings them closer. By the end, they nevertheless make peace with Zhenya's help.

=== Svaty 2 (2009) ===
The story takes place on the eve of 8 March. Masha is in the last month of pregnancy. She and Maxim have a crisis in their relationship, and their six-year-old daughter Zhenya begins to interfere. The girl finds an original solution – she calls her grandparents. In-laws are rushing to the rescue. They try to reconcile their children, but everyone does it in their own way, as a result of which in-laws do not just quarrel with children, but also bring the family to the brink of divorce. Only the alliance of the in-laws can save their marriage. Masha gives birth to twins.

=== Svaty 3 (2009) ===
Several months have passed since the events of the second part. Summer begins. Masha and Maxim leave for the Netherlands, and Zhenya is left in the village of Kuchugury under the supervision of Budko. The Kovalevs come to them to help look after their granddaughter and at the same time prepare her for entering a lyceum.

Since that moment, no less important character appears in the story – friend, cousin, neighbor and drinking buddy of Ivan Budko – Dmitry Bukhankin, who is called Mityai. In this season in-laws begin to get along. Together they have to lead a healthy lifestyle: do not drink, do not smoke and do not eat after 18:00. Ivan is fired from his job, but soon he returns to the bakery and becomes the manager of the garage.

=== Svaty 4 (2010) ===
The action takes place one year after the events of the third season, and again in the summer. The in-laws leave for Turkey to visit their children and grandchildren. Zhenya's parents send her to the children's camp "Artek". The grandparents go to Crimea, not so much to rest as to take care of their beloved granddaughter Zhenya. Grandparents never learn to live without a granddaughter; it is difficult for them to get along with each other. By happy circumstance they get a house, which they turn into a hotel, to show their gratitude for finding temporary housing all the money they have earned to Masha and Maxim. Olga and Yuri try to hide from all their divorce, but soon everyone learns about it, including Olga's parents.

=== Novogodniye Svaty (2010) ===
The main characters Ivan and Valentina decide to celebrate New Year modestly, without Christmas trees and festive delicacies, in the village of Kuchugury. Their city in-laws, Yuri and Olga Kovalev, arrive with their granddaughter Zhenya. Celebrities who are going to corporate parties nearby get stuck in the village because of heavy snowfall and drifts on the roads. The hotel does not have enough space, and the in-laws offer their services.

=== Svaty 5 (2011) ===
Since the last events eight years have passed. The young Kovalevs – Maxim and Masha – all this time have lived in the Netherlands. But now they decide to return to their homeland. The grandparents (Yuri Kovalev died three years ago before the events of the film from a heart attack) look forward to meeting with their grandchildren, but none of them expected to see a cheerful, fervent and sweet little Zhenechka in a new goth style with a bunch of problems and conflicts. But this is only part of the trouble for the grandparents. After all, there are also twins – Nikita and Vika, who turn out to be so modern and prudent that the black clothes and "black" humor of their older sister will be insignificant in comparison with their antics. For the whole summer, the three grandchildren get into the society of the spouses Budko and Olga Kovaleva. Alexandr Berkovich tries to win Olga's heart, and over time he succeeds. Zhenya finds a girlfriend who steals her boyfriend. Valentina has learned to drive a car and organized a food business, which she runs together with Larisa and Evgeniy Zhuk.

=== Svaty 6 (2012) ===
The story takes place six months after the events described in Svaty 5. In season 6, the plot covers almost the entire year, from March until the New Year. During this time in the life of the main characters a lot happens. The grandparents continue to re-educate the negligent twins and help solve problems to Genet. Olga Nikolaevna and Alexander Berkovich officially formulate their relations and marry. Ivan Budko takes up business, saves the country from bureaucracy, goes to work, is poisoned with mushrooms and celebrates an anniversary. Zhenya finishes school, goes to college to become a famous and meets her love of her life, an artist also named Zhenya. Zhenya's best friend and Alexander Berkovich's daughter, Katya Berkovich finds her true love Luaha and starts college along with Zhenya and starts off into many adventures. Nikita and Vika, Zhenya's younger twin siblings, start to become more mature but still causing mischief and having fun still. Larissa gives birth to a girl, and Mitya becomes a father for the third time (he already has two sons, an adult son Andrei from his first marriage, who lives separately, and a young Artem, their son and Larissa). The Budko family remains without a roof over their heads, and the mother-in-law goes to live at Bukhankin's. In-laws go to Euro-2012, a cruise along the Volga, a hike along the Carpathians, where they celebrate the New Year.

=== Svaty 7 (2021) ===
The granddaughter Zhenya has grown up and is about to marry a British man (Jack), and the restless grandparents want to help her make the right choice. A vacation in Belarus will result in an international scandal, a harmless trip to Georgia will turn into a series of incredible events, and even a trip to the 19th century will become family troubles.

== Production ==
In 2008, a two-part TV movie Svaty was shot in Kyiv. The project was not originally intended to continue, but after its success on television, it was extended for the second season (which was also filmed in a telefilm format), and then for subsequent seasons (shot in mini-series).

Svaty 6 was to be the final season. However, later the creators of the series said that it was possible to continue the series until the seventh season. Shooting of Svaty 7 was to begin in 2014, but because of the political situation in Ukraine it was postponed. In May 2015, Volodymyr Zelenskyy said that the scenario of the seventh season had already been written, but the shooting was still postponed. One of the reasons for this was the disagreement within the film crew: Zelenskyy, like the whole studio "Kvartal-95", supported the Ukrainian government's side in the matter of the Crimea and the armed conflict in the Donbas, while Russian actors, including Tatyana Kravchenko (born in Donetsk) and Fyodor Dobronravov, adhere to other views. In addition, Fyodor Dobronravov, Lyudmila Artemyeva and Nikolay Dobrynin were banned from entering Ukraine for their support of the Russian annexation of Crimea.

As a result, in 2017 it was decided to shoot Svaty 7 in Belarus, as well as in Georgia. As of the end of 2017, the filming was suspended.

The premiere of the seventh season took place on 20 December 2021 on 1+1, and on 27 December, on the Russia-1 TV channel.

== Spin-offs ==
On 10 December 2011, the premiere of the documentary project Svaty: zhizn bez grima (Life Without Make-up) was broadcast by Inter TV channel.

In 2012, came off the spin-off series Svaty – Baiki Mityaya (Mitiai's Tales). The series consists of twenty series, united by a common plot. Mitya tells about the "true" cases from his life to the inhabitants of the village of Kuchugury.

In 2012, Ukrainian television broadcast a culinary program Matchmaker at the Stove. The leading ones are Valentina's grandmother (Tatyana Kravchenko), great-grandmother Lyudmila Stepanovna (Olga Aroseva), granddaughter Zhenya (Sofia Stetsenko), neighbor Larissa (Olesya Zheleznyak) and Mitiai (Nikolay Dobrynin).

In 2016 the Kvartal 95 Studio released a cartoon Svatiki, which is an animated version of the selected moments from the series Svaty.

In 2019, the show of its own adaptation of Svaty began in Latvia as Radiņi (seriāls)

Also in 2019, the show of its own adaption of "Svaty" began in Lithuania as Uošvių nepasirinksi

== Cast ==
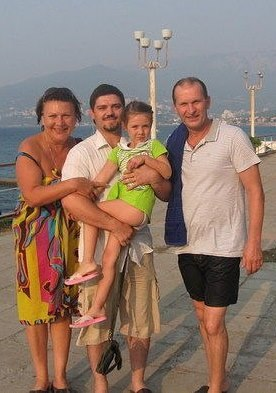
The main cast in Crimea during filming of the fourth season in 2010.

- Fyodor Dobronravov as Ivan Budko, Masha's father, husband of Valentina Petrovna; driver at the bakery, grandfather Zhenya, Vicki and Nikita (seasons 1–7, musical)
- Tatyana Kravchenko as Valentina Budko, mother of Masha, the wife of Ivan Stepanovich; junior technologist at the bakery, grandmother Zhenya, Vicki and Nikita (seasons 1–7, musical)
- Anatoly Vasilyev as Yuri Kovalev, Maxim's father, Olga's husband; professor of philosophy at the Berkovich Institute. Yuri Kovalev dies between the events of 4 and 5 seasons, grandfather of Zhenya, Vicki and Nikita (seasons 1–4, musical)
- Lyudmila Artemyeva as Olga Kovaleva (from the sixth season – Berkovich, born Koteeva), Maxim's mother, stepmother Katya Berkovich (seasons 5–6), in 1–4 seasons – Yuri's wife Anatolyevich, later – Alexander Berkovich; chief accountant of the Institute, grandmother Zhenya, Vicki and Nikita (seasons 1–7, musical)
- Aleksandr Feklistov as Aleksandr Berkovich, from season 6 – Olga's husband; Vice-Rector, later Rector of the Institute, from the sixth season – Corresponding Member of the Russian Academy of Sciences, Catherine's father, Yuri Anatolyevich's colleague (seasons 4–7)
- Ulyana Ivashchenko (1–2 seasons), Sofia Stetsenko (3–4 seasons, musical), Anna Koshmal (5–7 seasons) as Zhenya Kovaleva, granddaughter of matchmakers, daughter of Masha and Maxim (seasons 1–7, musical)
- Timofei Prots (4 season, 1 series), Kostya Chernokrylyuk (5–6 seasons) as Nikita Kovalev, grandson of matchmakers, son of Masha and Maxim (seasons 4–6)
- Lisa Prots (4 season, 1 series), Anya Polishchuk (5–6 seasons) as Victoria Kovaleva, granddaughter of matchmakers, the youngest daughter of Masha and Maxim (seasons 4–6)
- Marina Serdeshnyuk as Ekaterina Berkovich, daughter of San Sanych, girl Lesha (season 6), best friend of Evgenia Kovaleva (seasons 5–7)
- Denis Rodnyansky (1 season), Daniil Belykh (2–6 seasons) as Maxim Kovalev, son of Kovalev, Masha's husband, father of Zhenya and twins (seasons 1–7)
- Inna Koroleva as Maria Kovaleva (née Budko), the daughter of Budko, the wife of Maxim, the mother of Zhenya and the twins (seasons 1–2, 4–7)
- Nikolai Dobrynin as Dmitry Buchankin (Mitiai), the cousin of Ivan Budko, from the 5th season – husband of Larissa Viktorovna, father of Andrey, Artem and Nadia (seasons 3–7, musical)
- Dmitry Sova as Andrei Bukhankin, Mitya's son from his first marriage, the godson of Ivan Budko (season 3)
- Olesya Zheleznyak as Larisa Bukhankina, from the end of season 4 – the wife of Dmitry Alexandrovich, the mother of Artem and Nadia (seasons 4–7)
- Anton Pismenny as Artom Bukhankin, the son of Mitya and Larissa (seasons 5–6) (mentioned in season 7)
- Alexander Nevzorov (season 3), Yevgeniy Kaporin (5–7 seasons) as Aleksei Kirillovich Doldonov (Lyosha), a friend of Eugenia Kovaleva, Katerina Berkovich (6–7 season), son of Lyubov Georgievna and Kirill Doldonov (3, 5–7 seasons)
- Semyon Furman as Zhuk, rural oligarch (seasons 3, 5–6)
- Alexander Ignatusha as Aleksei Petrov (Alekseich), district in Kuchugury, husband of Lyubov Georgievna, stepfather of Lyosha (seasons 3, 5–7)
- Margarita Shubina as Lyubov Petrova, the mother of Lyosha, the wife of Alexei Alekseevich (seasons 3, 6–7)
- Alexei Kiryushchenko as Kirill Doldonov, the biological father of Lyosha (seasons 5–7)
- Denis Shepotinnik as Kirill Arsentiev, Evgenia Kovaleva's boyfriend (season 5)
- Alexander Gavrilyuk as Yevgeny Molchanov, Evgenia Kovaleva's boyfriend (season 6)
- Olga Aroseva as Lyudmila Koteeva, mother of Olga Nikolaevna, honored teacher (season 4–6)
- Vladimir Zeldin as Nikolai Koteev, father of Olga Nikolaevna, police general (seasons 4–5)
- Olesya Zhurakovskaya as Ksenia Pavlovna, business lady (seasons 4–6)
- Oleg Komarov as Valentin Podkopaev, brigadier of the drilling crew (seasons 4, 6)
- Emmanuil Vitorgan as Alexander Berkovich, the father of Berkovich Jr. (season 5)
- Tatyana Vasilyeva as Victoria Viktorovna, the mother of Larisa Bukhankina (season 6)
- Yelena Safonova as Eleonora Leonidovna, the second wife of Alexander Anatolyevich, stepmother Berkovich (season 5)

=== Celebrity cameos ===
- Vladimir Turchinsky as cameo in the store (Svaty 1)
- Philipp Kirkorov as cameo, guest of honor of Massandra Winery (Svaty 4, series 13, Novogodniye Svaty)
- Alexandra Savelyeva as cameo, singer (Novogodniye Svaty)
- Sergey Lazarev as cameo, singer (Novogodniye Svaty)
- Asiya Ahat as cameo, musician (Novogodniye Svaty)
- Jeanna Friske as cameo, singer (Novogodniye Svaty)
- Gorod 312 as cameo, band (Novogodniye Svaty)
- Avraam Russo as cameo, singer (Novogodniye Svaty)
- Soso Pavliashvili as cameo, singer (Novogodniye Svaty)
- Potap as cameo, singer (Novogodniye Svaty)
- Anastasia Stotskaya as cameo, singer (Novogodniye Svaty)
- Yuri Askarov as cameo, the host of the program (Novogodniye Svaty)
- Ani Lorak as cameo, singer (Novogodniye Svaty)
- Sergey Zverev as cameo, singer (Novogodniye Svaty)
- Oleg Mityaev as cameo (Svaty, season 7, episode 1)

== Ratings ==
The Svaty franchise of comedy films and series received very high ratings in Ukraine as well in Russia and Belarus.

The first episode of the fourth season on the TV channel Inter was watched by a third of TV viewers in Ukraine, thanks to which the series became the most successful program of the day, ahead of the television series Wedding Ring.

The sixth season was the most rated product of Ukrainian television in 2013 by an audience of 18 to 54 years in cities throughout Ukraine. The average rating of the series for this audience was 11.4%, the share of 29.2% of viewers. According to the audience of 18–54 in cities with a population of 50 thousand people and higher, the rating of the sixth season of Svaty was 9.3%, the share of 26.4% of the audience. On average, each episode of the series was watched by more than 4 million Ukrainian viewers.

According to polls by the Russian Public Opinion Research Center, Svaty became the most popular television series among Russians in 2011 – 12% of respondents named it the best series of the year. Svaty was also among the most popular series on the basis of 2009, 2010, 2013 years.
