= Alexander Mitta =

Soviet and Russian film director, screenwriter and actor (1933–2025)

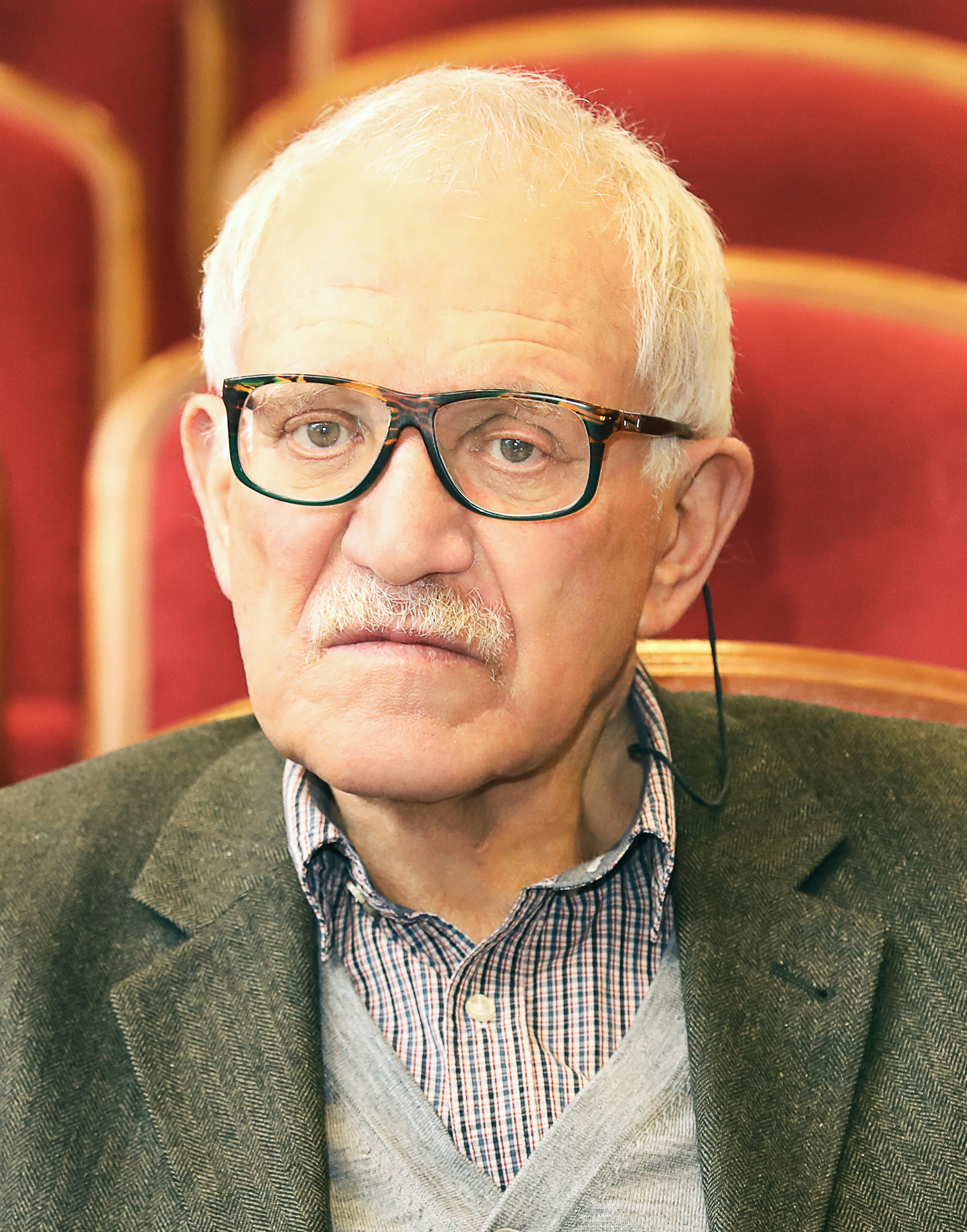
Mitta in 2017

Alexander Naumovich Mitta (Russian: Александр Наумович Митта; né Rabinovich; (Note: Russian: Рабинович) 28 March 1933 – 14 July 2025) was a Soviet and Russian film director, screenwriter and actor.

== Life and career ==
Alexander Naumovich Rabinovich was born on 28 March 1933. He studied engineering (graduated in 1955), then worked as a cartoonist in art and humour magazines. In 1960 Mitta graduated at the film directing faculty of the VGIK.

Mitta's career as film director and screenwriter spanned from the 1960s until the 2010s. Among the movies are Shine, Shine, My Star (1970) about actors trying to survive and work during the time of the Russian revolution or the high-budget catastrophe movie Air Crew (1979). For his work Mitta obtained numerous awards in the Soviet Union and Russia.

In 1980, Mitta was a member of the jury at the 30th Berlin International Film Festival.

Mitta supported the Russian annexation of Crimea in 2014, even though he also noted that he did not like that it served as a distraction for many from other problems Russia was facing.

Mitta died on 14 July 2025, at the age of 92.

== Filmography ==
=== Director ===
- 1961: My Friend, Kolka!
- 1962: No Fear, No Blame
- 1965: They're Calling, Open the Door
- 1969: Shine, Shine, My Star
- 1972: Dot, Dot, Comma...
- 1974: Moscow, My Love
- 1976: How Czar Peter the Great Married Off His Moor
- 1979: Air Crew
- 1982: The Story of Voyages
- 1988: A Step
- 1991: Lost in Siberia
- 2000: The Border. Taiga Romance
- 2002: Red-hot Saturday
- 2004: Swan Paradise
- 2013: Chagall — Malevich

=== Actor ===
- 1967: July Rain as Vladik
- 1998: Trial by Fire as Captain II
- 2010: The House of the Sun as exhibition visitor

== Film school ==
In the 2000s Mitta opened a film school.
