= The Boy and the Dove =

1961 film

- Russian: Мальчик и голубь
- Directed by: Andrey Konchalovsky
- Written by: Andrey Konchalovsky
- Starring: Nikolay Burlyaev
- Cinematography: Mikhail Kozhin
- Music by: Vyacheslav Ovchinnikov
- Release date: 1961
- Country: Soviet Union
- Language: Russian

The Boy and the Dove (Russian: Мальчик и голубь) is a 1961 Soviet short film directed by Andrey Konchalovsky.

== Plot ==
The film tells about a boy who dreams of acquiring a dove and depicting him on a wall. He can endlessly watch the birds flying in the sky. But the dove can't afford it. The guy decides to buy a dove for an album with stamps and sends a pigeon to the sky. But the dove returned to his former owner...

== Cast ==
- Nikolay Burlyaev
