= Bambi's Childhood =

1985 film

- Russian: Детство Бемби
- Directed by: Natalya Bondarchuk
- Written by: Natalya Bondarchuk; Yuriy Nagibin; Felix Salten
- Based on: Bambi a Life in the Woods by Felix Salten
- Starring: Ivan Burlyaev; Nikolai Burlyayev; Natalya Bondarchuk; Maris Liepa; Yekaterina Lychyova
- Cinematography: Aleksandr Filatov
- Music by: Boris Petrov
- Release date: 1985
- Country: Soviet Union
- Language: Russian

Bambi's Childhood (Russian: Детство Бемби) is a 1985 Soviet family film based on 1923 Austrian coming-of-age novel Bambi, a Life in the Woods by Felix Salten directed by Natalya Bondarchuk.

== Plot ==
The film tells about a deer named Bambi, who, from birth, learns to understand the mysterious forest world. Life seems beautiful to him, until suddenly his mother dies.

== Cast ==
- Ivan Burlyaev as Bambi (child)
- Nikolai Burlyayev as Bambi (adolescent)
- Natalya Bondarchuk as Agni, Bambi's mother
- Maris Liepa as Bambi's father
- Yekaterina Lychyova as Falina (child) (as Katya Lychyova)
- Galina Belyaeva as Falina (adolescent)
- Maksim Shalnov as Gobo
- Lev Durov as Eagle Owl
- Aivars Leimanis as Karus
- Inna Makarova as Netla
