= Nikolai Dobrynin =

Soviet and Russian actor

- Николай Добрынин
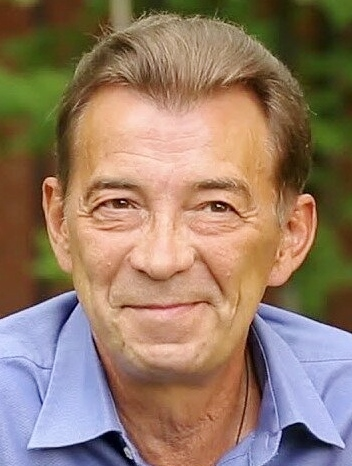
- Born: Nikolai Nikolaevich Dobrynin; August 17, 1963 (age 63); Taganrog, Rostov Oblast, Russian SFSR, Soviet Union
- Occupation: Actor
- Years active: 1985-presents

Nikolai Nikolaevich Dobrynin (Russian: Никола́й Никола́евич Добры́нин) is a Soviet and Russian stage and cinema actor, Meritorious Artist (2002).

== Biography ==
Nikolai Dobrynin was born in the city of Taganrog on August 17, 1963. In 1985 graduated from the GITIS. In 1985–1989 worked at Satyricon Theatre in Moscow under direction of Arkady Raikin. Since 1989 Nikolai Dobrynin has worked at the studio of Alla Sigalova and at Roman Viktyuk's theater.

His first film role was in the movie Nuzhnye lyudi (Necessary People) in 1986.

Due to previously visiting Russian-occupied Crimea, in November 2016 he was prevented from entering Ukraine by Ukrainian border guards.

== Selected filmography ==
- 1986 — Necessary People as builder Kolya
- 1987 — Farewell, Moscow Gang as Gavrosh
- 1993 — Russian Ragtime as Misha Raevsky
- 1997 — Everything is What We Dreamed of for So Long as Nikolai
- 2000 — The Black Room as Philipp
- 2010 — Liquidation as bandit
- 2010 — Gromozeka as Eduard Kaminsky, the surgeon
- 2013–2015 — The Junior Team as Nikolai Semenovich
- 2013 — Pyotr Leschenko. Everything That Was... as Konstantin
- 2014 — House with Lilies as Dementy Shulgin, 1st secretary of the Party Committee
- 2014 — Prisoner of the Caucasus! as Balbes
- 2015 — Rodina as General Maksimov
- 2015 — Orlova and Alexandrov as Leonid Utesov
- 2015 — The Alchemist. Elixir Faust as Grigory Rasputin
- 2018 — Tankers as Basich, a legless surgeon
- 2009–2021 — Svaty as Dmitri Bukhankin
