= Andris Liepa =

Russian ballet dancer, director and producer

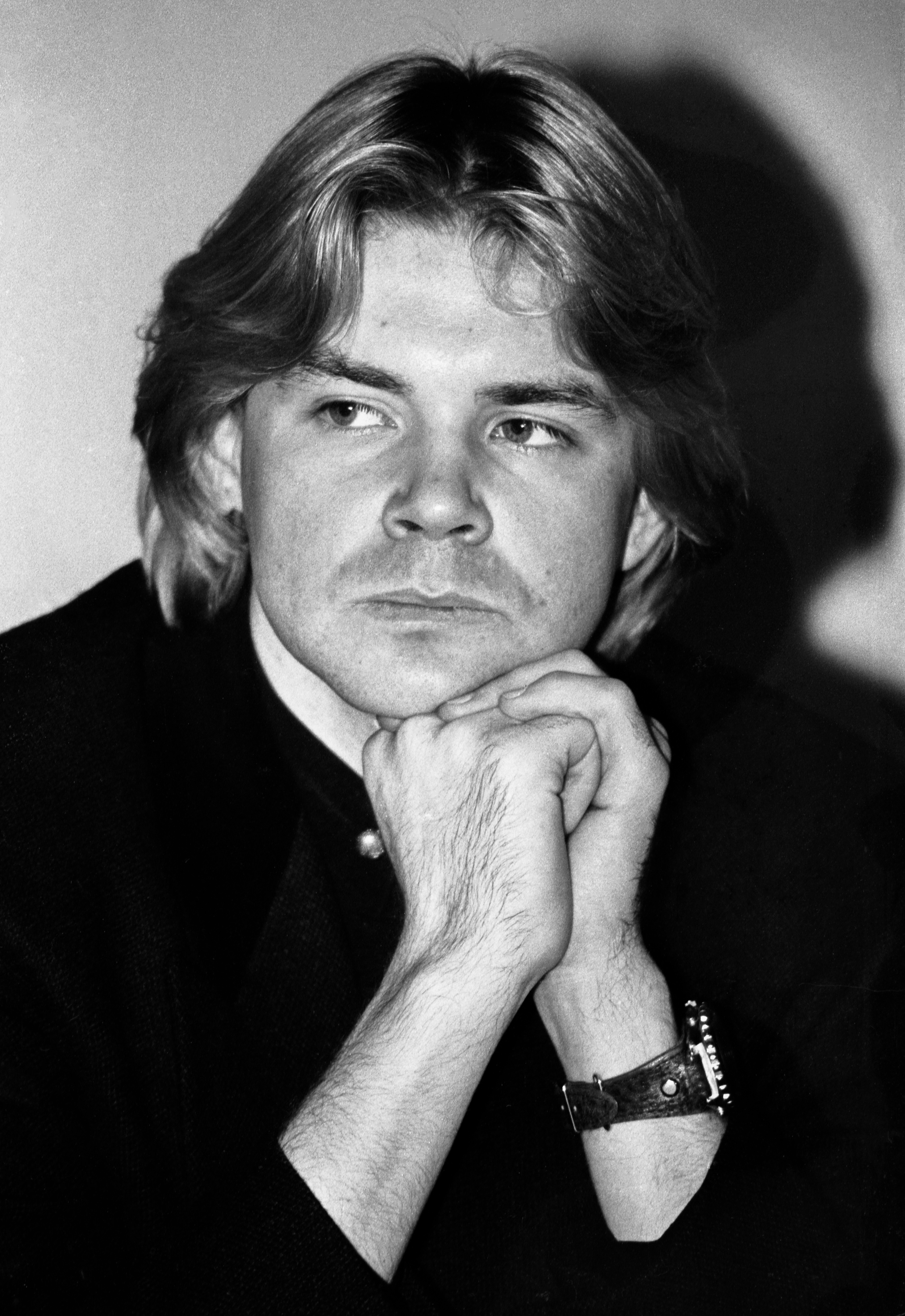
- Born: Andris Liepa; January 6, 1962 (age 64); Moscow, Russian SFSR, USSR
- Occupation: Dancer
- Employer: Bolshoi Theatre
- Adris Liepa's voice Liepao the Echo of Moscow program, 1 December 2009

Andris Liepa (Russian: Андрис Ма́рисович Лие́па; born Moscow, USSR, 6 January 1962) is a Russian ballet dancer, director and producer of Latvian ethnicity. He is the son of former Bolshoi Ballet dancer Māris Liepa.

== Biography ==
Andris Liepa was born on January 6, 1962, in Moscow in the family of the People's Artist of the USSR Māris Liepa and the actress of the Moscow Pushkin Drama Theatre Margarita Zhigunova and got his name in honor of his great-grandfather, Andrey Liepa. Sister - Ilze Liepa, ballet dancer, actress, People's Artist of Russia (2002), half-sister - Maria Liepa, opera singer.

In 1981 he became a laureate of the IV International Ballet Competition in the younger age group.

In 2007, he was awarded the highest award in Latvia - the Order of the Three Stars.

In 2018, he became a laureate of the Russian Rome International Cultural Festival, which was held in Rome at the Palazzo Poli.

Since January 16, 2019 - artistic director and chief choreographer of the State Academic Bolshoi Theater of Uzbekistan named after Alisher Navoi.
