= Terekhovo =

Terekhovo Терехово
- Selo
- Location within Belgorod Oblast Location within Russia
- Coordinates: 50°17′N 37°56′E
- Country: Russia
- Region: Belgorod Oblast
- District: Valuysky District
- Time zone: UTC+3:00

Terekhovo (Russian: Терехово) is a rural locality (a selo) in Valuysky District, Belgorod Oblast, Russia. The population was 71 as of 2010. There are 4 streets.

== Geography ==
Terekhovo is located 22 km northwest of Valuyki (the district's administrative centre) by road. Khokhlovo is the nearest rural locality.
