= Ilze Liepa =

Russian ballet dancer and actress

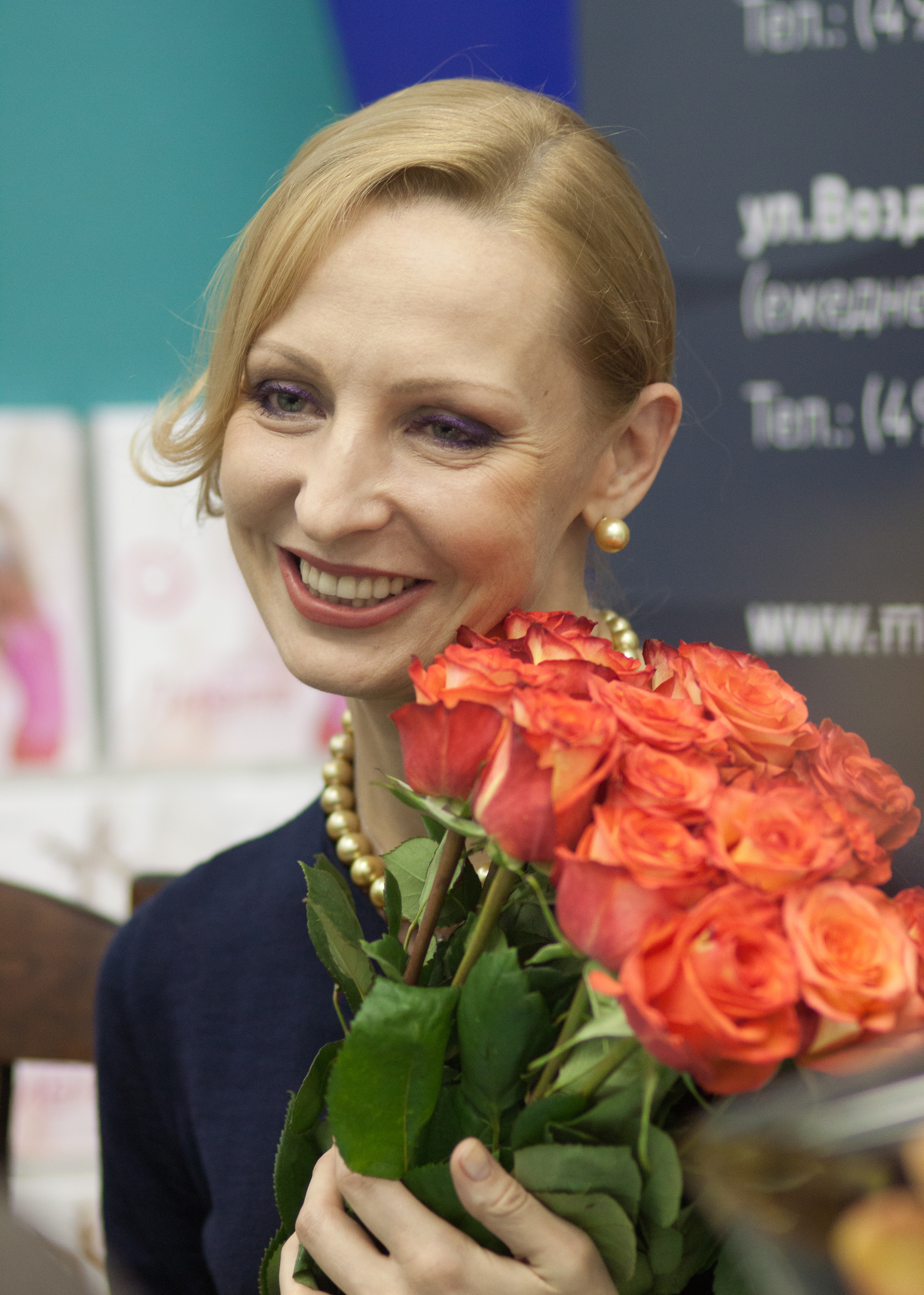

Ilze Marisovna Liepa (Russian: Илзе Марисовна Лиепа; born 22 November 1963 in Moscow) is a Russian ballet dancer and actress. She has been a soloist ballerina at the Bolshoi Theatre since 1981. She was invested with the title of Merited Artist of the Russian Federation in 1996, the People's Artist of Russia title in 2002, and was awarded the State Prize of the Russian Federation in 2003. She won a Golden Mask Award in 2003 for her performance in the ballet production Padaemand. She has also appeared in the films Bambi's Childhood (1985), Lermontov (1986), Parallel Voices (2005), and The Bottomless Bag (2017), and the miniseries Empire Under Attack (2000). She has further authored the books Liepa method. Philosophy of the body. (2012), and Theatrical Sculptures (2014).

Liepa held dual Lithuanian and Russian citizenship. After an interview where she expressed support for Vladimir Putin in the Russian invasion of Ukraine, Liepa was stripped of her Lithuanian citizenship in 2024 by presidential decree.
