= Katya Lycheva =

Russian child peace activist and child actress

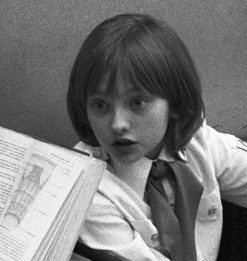
Katya Lycheva in the classroom, 1986

Yekaterina Alexandrovna Lycheva or Lychyova (Russian: Екатерина Александровна Лычёва) (born 10 June 1974), best known as Katya Lycheva (Russian: Катя Лычёва), (Note: "Katya" is a hypocoristic form of "Yekaterina".) is a Soviet-born Russian woman who served as a child "Goodwill ambassador" to the United States in 1986. She also acted in a number of Soviet films for children. She was born in Moscow.

== Goodwill visit to the United States ==
Lycheva's visit to the United States was a Soviet response to a highly publicised visit to the Soviet Union by 11-year-old Maine resident Samantha Smith in 1983. Together with Star Rowe, an 11-year-old American girl, Lycheva visited cities across the United States, including New York, Los Angeles, and Washington D.C. Lycheva met the mayors of the cities she visited and met with President Ronald Reagan in Washington. A book was published about her travels.

Two years after her visit, she moved with her mother to Paris, received economic and legal education in France, and returned to Russia only in 2000. Then she was an official in the Ministry of Labour and Social Protection and in 2005-2009 she was a vice-president of AvtoVAZ company

== Family and lineage ==
On her mother's side, Katya Lycheva is the great-granddaughter of Maria Ovsyannikova (1904–1985), who was close to Joseph Stalin functionary of Soviet special services with extensive personal connections in the midst of the Soviet nomenclature. She is also the granddaughter of the Soviet film actor Anatoly Ignatiev (1926–1986), who played Soviet WWII hero Alexander Matrosov in the same name film.

== Film career ==
Lycheva appeared in several children's films produced in the Soviet Union.

- 1982: Live Rainbow
- 1984: Сильная личность из 2 «А»
- 1985: Bambi's Childhood
- 1986: Lermontov (1986 film)
- 1987: ru:Как дома, как дела?
