= Natalya Bondarchuk =

Russian actress and director (born 1950)

- Наталья Бондарчук
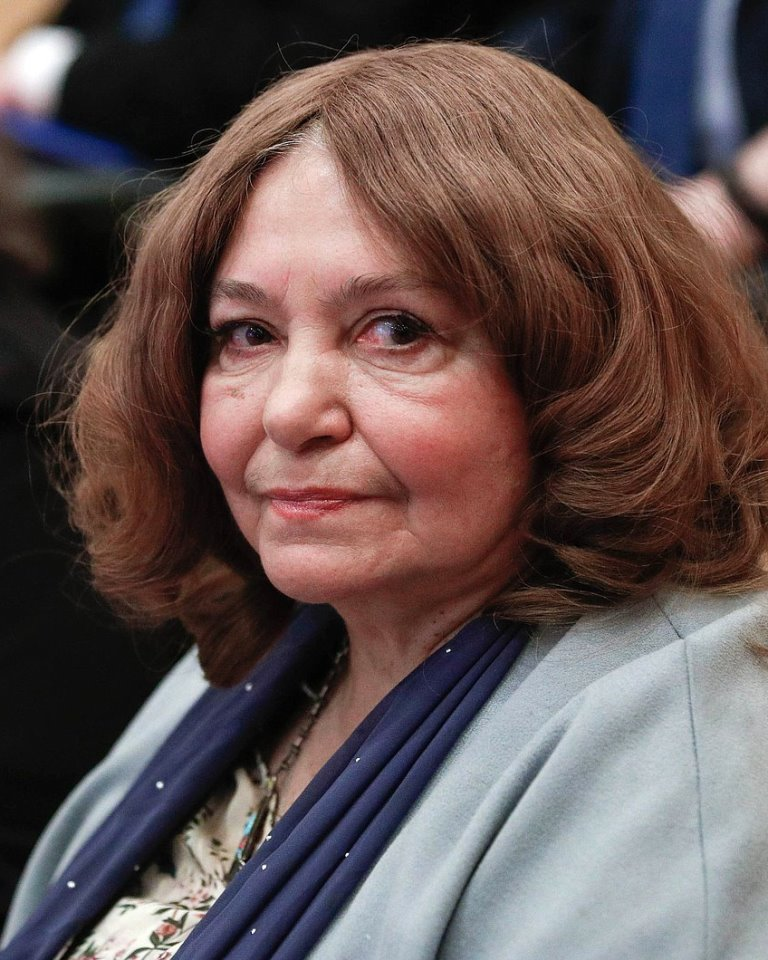
- Bondarchuk in 2023
- Born: 10 May 1950 (age 76); Moscow, Soviet Union
- Years active: 1969–present
- Spouse: Nikolai Burlyayev
- Children: Ivan Burlyayev
- Parent(s): Sergei Bondarchuk; Inna Makarova
- Awards: Merited Artist (1977)

Natalya Sergeyevna Bondarchuk (Russian: Наталья Серге́евна Бондарчук; born 10 May 1950) is a Soviet and Russian actress and film director, best known for her appearance in Andrei Tarkovsky's Solaris as "Hari". She is the daughter of Soviet director and actor Sergei Bondarchuk and Russian actress Inna Makarova. Her half-brother is film director and actor Fyodor Bondarchuk; her half-sister is actress Yelena Bondarchuk.

== Biography ==
Natalya Bondarchuk was born in Moscow to Soviet director and actor Sergei Bondarchuk and the Russian actress Inna Makarova. In 1971 she graduated from the acting school of the Gerasimov Institute of Cinematography and in 1975 from the directing school there.

She made her film debut in 1969 in Sergei Gerasimov's By the Lake, followed by the 1971 productions You and Me, by Larisa Shepitko, and A Soldier Came Back from the Front, by Nikolai Gubenko. She became internationally famous for her role as "Hari" in Andrei Tarkovsky's Solaris in 1972. It was her favorite role. She was also Tarkovsky's favorite of the film, as he wrote in his diary that "Natalya B. has outshone everybody".

In 1973 she met her future husband Nikolai Burlyayev on the set of the Nikolai Mashchenko film How the Steel Was Tempered. The two later withdrew from their participation in this film. In 1976 their son Ivan was born.

She played princess Mariya Volkonskaya in the 1975 historical film The Captivating Star of Happiness by Vladimir Motyl.

As a director, Bondarchuk debuted with the episode The Hapless Matrenka in Old Times in Poshekhonia (1975), an original adaptation of a novel by 19th-century satirist Mikhail Saltykov-Shchedrin, which was her diploma work. In 1982 she directed her first feature film, Zhivaya raduga (Living Rainbow). The film was produced in Yalta. In 1985 she directed the film Bambi's Childhood, and in 1986 the film Bambi's Youth. She also directed the Nikolai Leskov adaptation Lord, Hear My Prayer (1991). Bondarchuk has always acted in her own films, as have her longtime husband, Nikolai Burliaev, and their son, Ivan Burliaev. Bondarchuk has taught at VGIK since 1979.

Natalya Bondarchuk also leads a child opera theater on Krasnaya Presnya in Moscow. Her son Ivan Burlyayev sang in this theater during his childhood.

== Filmography ==
=== As actress ===
- 1969 : By the Lake as passenger on a train
- 1971 : You and Me as Nadya
- 1972 : Solaris as Hari
- 1975 : The Captivating Star of Happiness as Volkonskaya
- 1976 : Red and Black as Madame de Rênal
- 1980 : The Youth of Peter the Great as Sophia Alekseyevna of Russia
- 1982 : Living Rainbow as Mariya Sergeyevna
- 1985 : Bambi's Childhood as Agni, Bambi's mother
- 1986 : Lermontov as Mariya Mikhailovna Lermontova, Mikhail Lermontov's mother

=== As director ===
- 1982 : Living Rainbow
- 1985 : Bambi's Childhood
- 1986 : Bambi's Youth
- 1991 : God, hear my prayer
- 2006 : Pushkin: The Last Duel
- 2015 : Snow Queen
