= Tatyana Vasilyeva =

Russian actress

- Татьяна Васильева
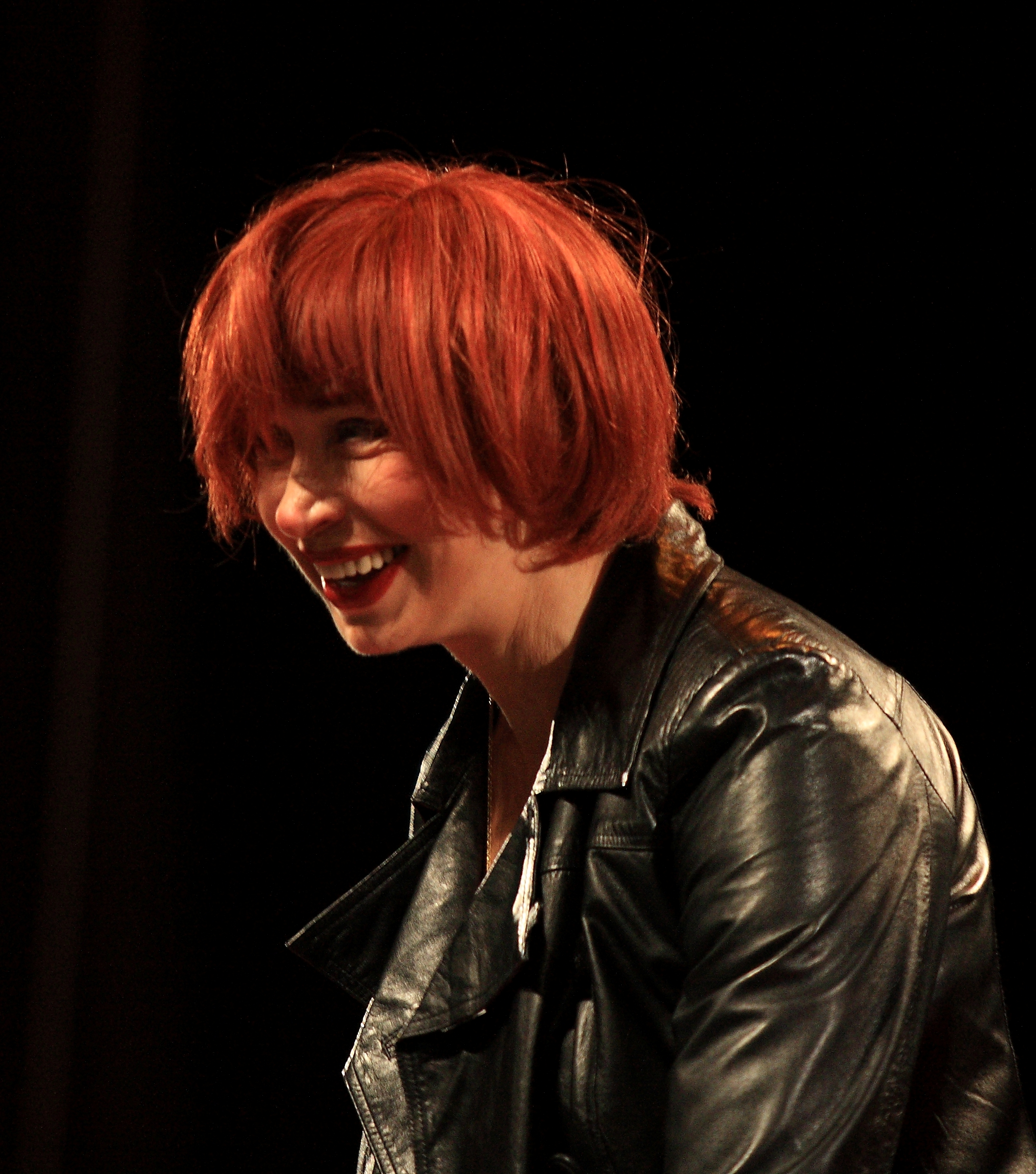
- Vasilyeva in 2010
- Born: Tatyana Grigoryevna Itsykovich; 28 February 1947 (age 79); Leningrad, Russian SFSR, Soviet Union
- Occupation: Actress
- Years active: 1969-present
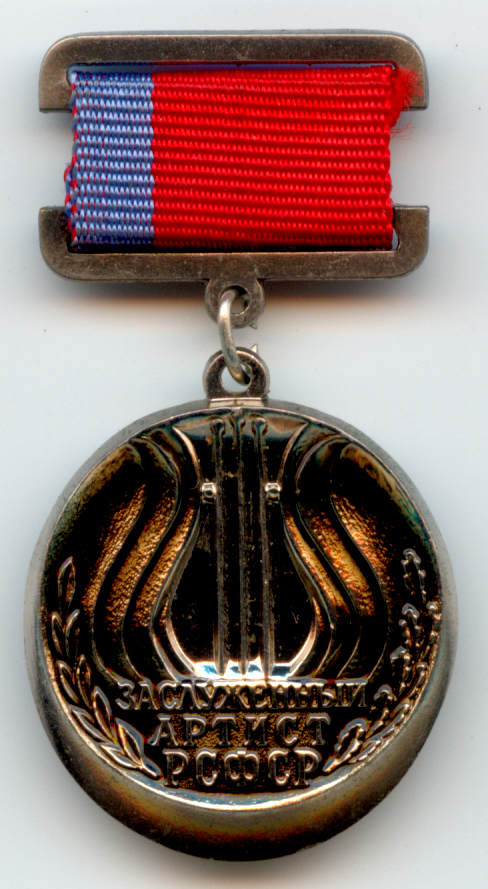
- Awards

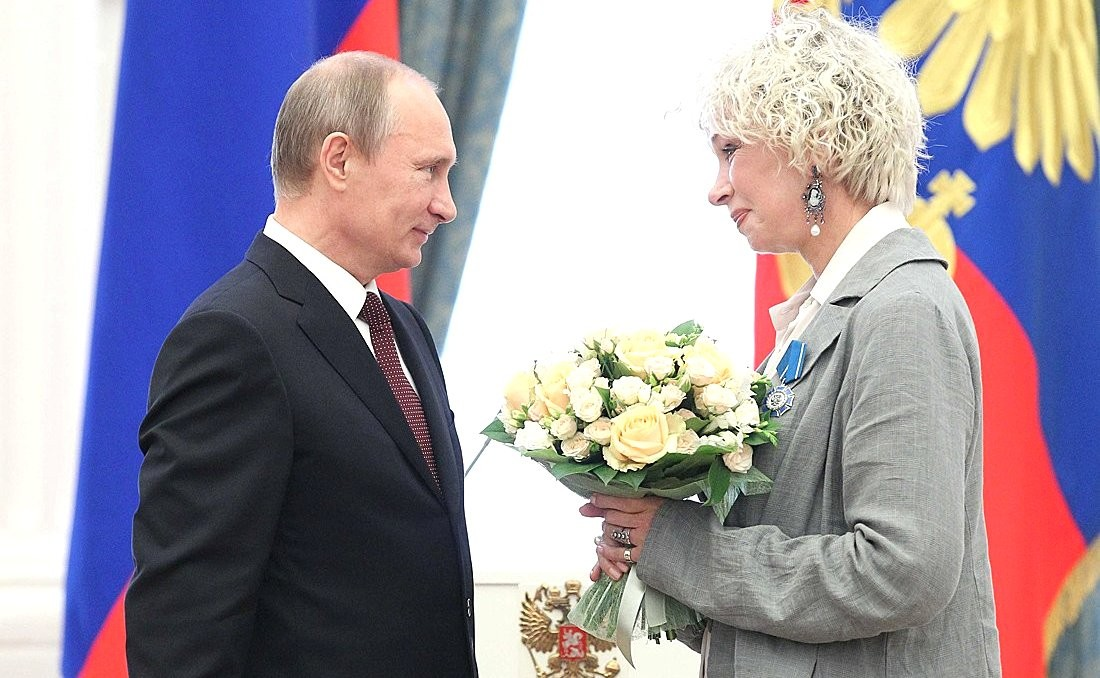
Receiving Medal of Honor, 3 July 2013

Tatyana Grigoryevna Vasilyeva (Russian: Татья́на Григо́рьевна Васи́льевa; born 28 February 1947) is a Soviet and Russian theater and film actress, and TV presenter. She has appeared in more than seventy films since 1969. She was named a People's Artist of the Russian Federation in 1992.

== Biography ==
She graduated from the Moscow Art Theatre School (course of Vasiliy Markov) in 1969. In 1969–1983, she acted at the Moscow Satire Theater. Her first theatre role was as the Commissioner in The Time in Captivity, based on a play by Alexander Stein.

From 1983 to 1992, she performed at the Moscow Academic Mayakovsky Theatre.

Since 1996, she has been acting at The School of Modern Play.

From June 4 to August 31, 2012, she led the program Between Us, Girls on Channel One, and, from April 1 to May 30, 2014, moderated Your case... on Channel One.

== Selected filmography ==
- 1975 — Hello, I'm Your Aunt! as Annie
- 1979 — Kind Men as Iraida Yaroslavna
- 1980 — The Evening Labyrinth as Eleonora
- 1985 — The Most Charming and Attractive as Susanna
- 1992 — White King, Red Queen as Yekaterina
- 1998 — The Circus Burned Down, and the Clowns Have Gone as Margarita
- 2005 — Popsa as Larisa Ivanovna
- 2007 — Waiting for a Miracle as Renata Genrikhovna
- 2012 — Svaty as Viktoria Viktorovna

== Personal life ==
Her first husband (1973-1983) was actor Anatoly Vasilyev (born 1946), People's Artist of the Russian Federation (1994). Their son, Philip (born July 30, 1978), is an actor. The second husband (1983-1995) was actor Georgy Martirosyan (born 1948), Honored Artist of the Russian Federation (2004). Their daughter is Elizaveta Martirosyan (born November 5, 1986).
