= Inna Makarova =

Soviet and Russian actress (1926–2020)

- Инна Макарова
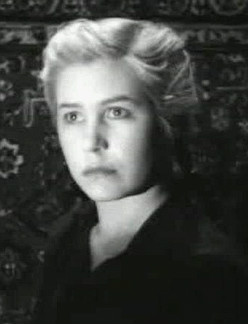
- Makarova in The Young Guard (1948)
- Born: Inna Vladimirovna Makarova; 28 July 1926; Tayga, Siberian Krai, RSFSR, Soviet Union
- Died: 25 March 2020 (aged 93); Moscow, Russia
- Occupation: Actress
- Years active: 1945–2015
- Spouse(s): Sergei Bondarchuk (m. 1949; div. 1956)
- Children: Natalya Bondarchuk

Inna Vladimirovna Makarova (Russian: И́нна Влади́мировна Мака́рова; 28 July 1926 – 25 March 2020) was a Soviet and Russian actress. She grew up in Novosibirsk. In 1948 she graduated from the Gerasimov Institute of Cinematography in Moscow and began to work as an actress at the National Film Actors' Theatre. In 1949, she was awarded the Stalin Prize for her role as Lyubov Shevtsova in Sergei Gerasimov's The Young Guard. In 1985, she was awarded the designation of People's Artist of the USSR. Inna Makarova was married to Sergei Bondarchuk and is the mother of Natalya Bondarchuk.

Makarova died in Moscow on 25 March 2020 at the age of 93.

== Selected filmography ==
Makarova on a 2026 postcard of Russia

- It Happened in the Donbass (1945)
- The Young Guard (1948)
- The Return of Vasili Bortnikov (1953)
- The Rumyantsev Case (1956)
- The Height (1957)
- My Beloved (1958)
- The Girls (1961)
- Balzaminov's Marriage (1964)
- The Big Ore (1964)
- Crime and Punishment (1970)
- Russian Field (1971)
- Incorrigible Liar (1973)
- It Is Not Evening Yet (1973)
- Dead Souls (1984)
- Strawberries (1996)
- Pushkin: The Last Duel (2006)
- The Mystery of the Snow Queen (2015)
