= List of recipients of the USSR State Prize =

The USSR State Prize was the Soviet Union's state honor. It was established on 9 September 1966. After the dissolution of the Soviet Union, the prize was followed up by the State Prize of the Russian Federation.

== Recipients of the State Prize in science and engineering by year ==
=== 1967 ===
- Vladimir Chelomei: missile design
- Vitaly Goryaev: for illustrations for Dostoevsky's Petersburg Tales

=== 1968 ===
- Pavel Solovyov: engines design
- Birutė Kasperavičienė, Bronislovas Krūminis, Vaclovas Zubras, Ṧmuelis Liubeckis: for the design of the residential microdistrict Žirmūnai
- Dmitri Lyudvigovich Tomashevich for the design of the 3M7 Drakon

=== 1969 ===
- Lev Korolyov: computer science
- Evgeny Abramyan: nuclear physics
- Nikolai Ryzhkov: future Soviet premier
- Alexander Yanshin

=== 1970 ===
- Dmitrii Evgenievich Okhotsimsky: space scientist
- Alexander Yakovlevich Bereznyak: for missile design (KSR-5 and Kh-28)
- Vladimir Polukhin: optics
- Ali Guliyev: chemistry

=== 1971 ===
- Alexander Yakovlevich Bereznyak: for missile design (Kh-22M)
- Sergey Ilyushin: aeronautical engineering

=== 1972 ===
- Andrey Kapitsa: geographer

=== 1973 ===
- The developer of the KT315 transistor
- Moshe Sneideris: medical xeroradiography

=== 1974 ===
- Olga Avilova: surgeon
- Boris Babaian
- Vladimir Chelomei: for missile design

=== 1975 ===
- Igor Sergeevich Seleznev: for missile design (Kh-22MA)
- Lev Aleksandrovich Shuvalov: for crystal chemistry of ferroelectrics
- Sergei Vonsovsky: physics

=== 1976 ===
- Arseny Mironov: for flight testing and introduction into service the Su-24 tactical bomber
- Igor Novozhilov: Russian-Karelian physicist and mathematician

=== 1977 ===
- Pavel Alekseyevich Cherenkov: physics
- Yuri Valentinovich Knorozov: linguistic research
- Igor Sergeevich Seleznev: for missile design (KSR-5P)
- Alexander Sergeyevich Yakovlev: aeronautical engineering
- Imamaliev Aydyn Salarovich: в области техники

=== 1979 ===
- Nikolai Ryzhkov, future Soviet premier
- Arkady Ostashev: scientist, participant in the launch of the first artificial Earth satellite and the first cosmonaut

=== 1980 ===
- Grigory Eisenberg
- Viktor Kremenuk, Institute for US and Canadian Studies (ISKRAN)

=== 1981 ===
- Valentin Panteleimonovich Smirnov
- Fedor Andreevich Kuznetsov: materials science
- Evgeny Michailovich Zemskov
- Vera Faddeeva: computational science
- Maksim Ovodenko: metallurgist

=== 1982 ===
- Alexei Abrikosov: physics
- Vladimir Chelomei: missile design
- Sergei Chudinov: physics
- Sergei Vonsovsky: physics
- Nicolai Brandt: physics
- Vladimir Ivanov-Omsky: physics
- Victor Ogorodnikov: physics
- Isaac Tsidilkovsky: physics
- Victor A. Brumberg: physics
- Saima Karimova: geology

=== 1983 ===
- Igor Spassky

=== 1984 ===
- Zhores Alferov: physics
- Nikolay Bogolyubov: physics
- Igor Sergeevich Seleznev: missile design (Kh-59)
- Ilia Vekua
- Yuri Yu. Gleba: biology
- ??? (for project 877 Varshavyanka submarine)
- Algis Petras Piskarskas: nonlinear optics
- Eugen Doga: composer

=== 1985 ===
- Anatoliy O. Morozov: for the "Ulianovsk" flexible manufacturing system
- Feodor Ivanovich Vilesov, Volodymyr Nemoshkalenko: for the development of the method of photoelectron spectroscopy and its application in science and technology

=== 1986 ===
- Ahliman Amiraslanov: oncologist
- Gennady Leonov: mathematics
- Alexei Bogdanov: chemist and molecular biologist

=== 1987 ===
- Nail H. Ibragimov: mathematics
- Alexander Nadiradze: missile design
- Dimitri Donskoy: for work on nonlinear acoustics
- Natalya Alexandrovna Smirnova chemical

=== 1988 ===
- Yury Kopaev: physics
- Gregory Pikus: physics
- Ruslan Stratonovich: mathematics
- Stepan Badalov: geology
- Vladimir Kondratiev

=== 1989 ===
- Nikolay Basov: physics
- Alexei Fridman, Nikolai Gor'kavyi: science and technology, for predicting of a system of new satellites of Uranus based on developed theory of collective and collisional processes in planetary rings.

== Recipients of the State Prize in literature and arts by year ==
=== 1967 ===
- Anatoly Polyansky, D.S.Vitukhin, Yu.V.Ratskevich, etc.: architecture, for "Pribrezhny" complex of Artek
- Sergei Yutkevich and Yevgeni Gabrilovich: for the film Lenin in Poland
- Vytautas Žalakevičius, Donatas Banionis, and Jonas Gricius: for the film Nobody Wanted to Die

=== 1968 ===
- Mark Donskoy: for the film A Mother's Heart
- Tahir Salahov: painter and draughtsman; for the portrait of composer Gara Garayev

=== 1970 ===
- Stanislav Rostotsky, Boris Dulenkov, Vyacheslav Shumsky, Nina Menshikova, Georgi Polonsky, and Vyacheslav Tikhonov: for the film We'll Live Till Monday

=== 1971 ===
- Aleksandr Tvardovsky: literature
- Sergei Gerasimov, Vladimir Rapoport, Pyotr Galadzhev, Oleg Zhakov, Vasily Shukshin, and Natalya Belokhvostikova: for the film By the Lake

=== 1974 ===
- Qaysin Quli: literature
- Boris Buneev: film

=== 1976 ===
- Sergey Mikaelyan: film
- Alexander Isaakovich Gelman: film
- Gevorg Emin: literature
- Dmitri Anosov: science
- Valentin Zorin: television documentaries

=== 1977 ===
- Mikael Tariverdiev

=== 1978 ===
- Andrey Voznenesensky
- Evgeny Belyaev: music, tenor soloist
- Tokay Mammadov: sculptor

=== 1979 ===
- Yuri Norstein: arts

=== 1980 ===
- Omar Eldarov: sculptor; for monument-ensemble to Sadriddin Ayni in Dushanbe

=== 1981 ===
- Vladimir Shainsky
- Boris Shtokolov
- Shafiga Mammadova: cinema and theatre actress; for Gulya's role in Interrogation film
- Rustam Ibragimbekov: screenwriter, dramatist and producer; for the screenplay Interrogation (1979)

=== 1982 ===
- Rostislav Grigor'yevich Boyko, composer

=== 1983 ===
- Yevgeni Gabrilovich, Sergei Yutkevich, Nikolai Nemolyayev, and Lyudmila Kusakova: for the film Lenin in Paris
- Valery Gavrilin: for the Choral Symphony

=== 1984 ===
- Bakhtiyar Vahabzadeh: literature

=== 1985 ===
- Arkady Khait (screenwriter), Anatoli Reznikov (director), Vyacheslav Nazaruk (artist): for animated cartoon series Leopold the Cat (category "Works of literature and arts for children")

=== 1986 ===
- Levonid Yakovlev
- Aleksei Losev: for his History of Classical Aesthetics

=== 1987 ===
- Vladimir Kobekin
- Yuriy Mushketyk (writer)
- Kostas Smoriginas: theatre

=== 1988 ===
- Vladimir Dudintsev
- Dmitri Pokrovsky

=== 1991 ===
- Bulat Okudzhava
