= Autobiographies of Maxim Gorky =

Autobiographical trilogy by Maxim Gorky

My Childhood. Amid Attendants. My Universities
- Cover of Penguin Classics edition (1991)
- Author: Maxim Gorky
- Original title: Детство. В людях. Мои университеты
- Translator: Gertrude M. Foakes
- Language: Russian
- Subject: Life
- Genre: Fictional autobiography
- Published: 1913–14/1915/1923
- Publication place: Russia
- English publication date: 1915/1916/1923

Maxim Gorky wrote three autobiographical works, namely My Childhood (Russian: Детство, romanized: Detstvo), Amid Attendants (Russian: В людях, romanized: V lyudyakh) and My Universities (Russian: Мои университеты, romanized: Moi universitety). These were often published under the title Autobiography of Maxim Gorky or simply as Autobiography and mentioned as "the autobiographical series" and My Childhood. Amid Attendants. My Universities.

The first part of Gorky's autobiography, My Childhood, was published in Russian in 1913–14, and in English in 1915. It was republished by Pocket Penguins in 2016.

The second part, Amid Attendants (also translated as In the World and as My Apprenticeship), was published in 1916.

The third part, My Universities, appeared in 1923.

In these works Gorky has abandoned the form of fiction and all (apparent) literary invention; he has also hidden himself and given up taking any part in his characters' "quest for truth." He is a realist, a great realist finally freed from all the scales of romance, tendency, or dogma. He has finally become an objective writer. This makes his autobiographical series one of the strangest autobiographies ever written. It is about everyone except himself. His person is only the pretext round which to gather a wonderful gallery of portraits. Gorky's most salient feature in these books is his wonderful visual convincingness... Gorky is not a pessimist... Gorky's autobiographical series represents the world as ugly but not unrelieved — the redeeming point, which may and must save humanity, are enlightenment, beauty, and sympathy.

— D. S. Mirsky

== Screen adaptation ==
- The Childhood of Maxim Gorky, Gorky 2: My Apprenticeship, Gorky 3: My Universities, films by Mark Donskoy.
