= Varvara Massalitinova =

Russian and Soviet actress

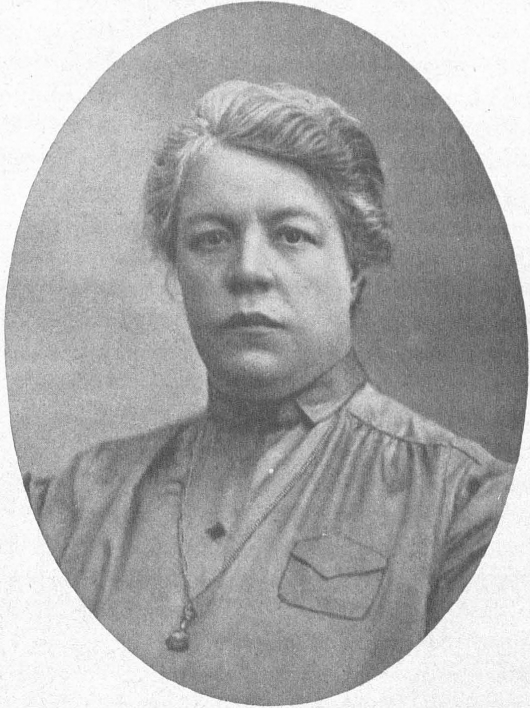
Varvara Massalitinova

Varvara Osipovna Massalitinova (Russian: Варвара Осиповна Массалитинова; July 29, 1878 – October 20, 1945) was a Russian and Soviet stage and film actress.

== Life and career ==
Born at Yelets in Oryol Governorate, she began acting at an amateur theatre club in the Siberian city of Tomsk. She then moved to Moscow and studied acting under Aleksandr Lensky at the Moscow Theatrical school, from which she graduated in 1901 as an actress.

From 1901 to 1945 Varvara Massalitinova was a permanent member of the troupe at Maly Academic Theatre in Moscow. There she worked on stage with such actors as Maria Yermolova, Elena Gogoleva, Aleksandra Yablochkina, Vera Pashennaya, Alexander Yuzhin, Alexander Ostuzhev, Vladimir Davydov, Konstantin Zubov, Stepan Kuznetsov, Nikolay Annenkov, Mikhail Tsaryov, Igor Ilyinsky and many other notable Russian actors. She became famous in 1902 after her powerful stage performances as Korobochka in Nikolai Gogol's classic drama Dead Souls. Among her best-known stage roles were such classic parts as the officer's widow in the 1903 staging of The Government Inspector, Merchutkina in Jubiley (1904), based on a play by Anton Chekhov, and Kukushkina in the 1911 staging of A Profitable Position. Over the course of her stage career Massalitinova established herself as one of the best performers in the classic plays by Alexander Ostrovsky.

In 1922 Massalitinova made her film debut in a small role in a silent movie Polikushka. Then she worked with director Yakov Protazanov in the first Russian sci-fi experiment, Aelita (1924), where she appeared alongside Mikhail Zharov and Igor Ilyinsky among other fellow actors from the Maly Theatre. In 1939 Massalitinova received a state award for her portrayal of the grandmother of writer Maxim Gorky in the 1938 classic film trilogy by director Mark Donskoy based on Gorky's autobiographical books. Her best-known role was the mother of the Russian folk hero Buslai in the acclaimed film Alexander Nevsky (1938) by director Sergei Eisenstein, starring Nikolay Cherkasov and Nikolay Okhlopkov.

Varvara Massalitinova was designated as a People's Artist of the RSFSR and was awarded for her performances on stage and in film (Stalin Prize, 1941). She died on October 20, 1945, in Moscow and was laid to rest in the Novodevichy Cemetery in Moscow.

== Filmography ==
- Gorky 2: My Apprenticeship (1939) .... Akulina Ivanovna Kashirina

... aka Gorky Trilogy II
... aka My Apprenticeship
... aka On His Own (USA)
... aka Out in the World

- Alexander Nevsky (1938) as Amelfa Timoferevna - Buslai's Mother
- The Childhood of Maxim Gorky (1938) as Akulina Ivanva Kashirin, grandmother
- Groza (1934) .... Marfa Ignatovna Kabanova, her mother-in-law

... aka Гроза (Soviet Union: Russian title)
... aka The Storm

- Aelita (1924)
- Morozko (1924)
