= The Dawns Here Are Quiet (1972 film) =

The Dawns Here Are Quiet (А зори здесь тихие)
- Directed by: Stanislav Rostotsky
- Written by: Stanislav Rostotsky, Boris Vasilyev
- Starring: Andrey Martynov; Yelena Drapeko; Yekaterina Markova; Olga Ostroumova; Irina Shevchuk; Irina Dolganova; Lyudmila Zaytseva
- Production company: Gorky Film Studio
- Release date: 1972
- Running time: 188 minutes
- Country: Soviet Union
- Language: Russian

The Dawns Here Are Quiet (Russian: А зори здесь тихие, romanized: A zori zdes tikhiye) is a 1972 Soviet war drama directed by Stanislav Rostotsky based on Boris Vasilyev's novel of the same name, The Dawns Here Are Quiet. The film deals with antiwar themes and focuses on a garrison of Russian female soldiers in World War II. It was nominated for an Oscar in the Best Foreign Language Film category. The film is set in Karelia (near Finland) and was filmed near Ruskeala.

== Plot ==
The film opens in color, with a girl taking off her motorcycle helmet—she is camping with her friends. It then shifts to summer 1942, in the same area, in the midst of World War II some ways behind the Soviet frontlines on the Eastern Front.

Having asked for soldiers who don't drink alcohol and fraternize with women, Company Sergeant Major Vaskov is unexpectedly assigned a group of young female anti-aircraft gunners in a railway station far from the front line. Vaskov is not used to commanding women and clashes with them over daily issues. During an air raid, one of the girls, junior sergeant Rita Osyanina, shoots down an enemy aircraft and is decorated for her deeds. Dialogue and flashbacks in color begin to reveal the backstories of the women. It is also shown that Rita regularly sneaks food back to her mother and baby, who are not far from the front.

One day, Rita, having secretly carried rations to her family during the night, comes across two German paratroopers on her way back to the garrison. Vaskov chooses five volunteers: Rita, Zhenya, Lisa, Galya and Sonia, to embark with him on a mission to eliminate them. They decide to cross the marshland to intercept the Germans but the going is slow and treacherous, causing Galya to lose a boot. When they finally reach the location that Vaskov knows that the German paratroopers will have to pass, they lie in wait—only to find that there are sixteen German paratroopers instead of two. His soldiers come up with the idea to bluff the paratroopers into thinking that there are a lot of civilians in their path, by cutting down trees and lighting fires, which will cause the Germans to change direction. Though the plan almost fails, Zhenya's last-minute audacity in jumping into the river convinces the paratroopers to take a detour through the forest. Vaskov sends Lisa back to base for reinforcements.

The group left in the forest prepare to reroute to avoid direct contact with the German troops. Backs against the wall, they engage in guerrilla warfare with the Germans. Sonia is killed by a knife and Galya is shot and dies immediately from her wounds. Vaskov, to create a diversion, leads the Germans away from the remaining two soldiers, firing at them with his Nagant revolver as they chase him through the forest. Vaskov is shot in the arm but manages to escape from the Germans—realizing that the reinforcements have not come, he hallucinates about Lisa, who tells him that she failed because she went too fast, drowning in the wet marshland.

He miraculously comes across Rita and Zhenya but after a tearful reunion realizes that they have disobeyed his orders to retreat. He searches in his bag for a grenade to mount a suicide attack with but finds that the girls have taken the detonator out. Although he threatens to court martial them for continuing to disobey orders, they refuse to leave and instead prepare to ambush the Germans. During a prolonged engagement, Rita is injured by shrapnel from a grenade and tells Zhenya to leave her. Realizing that they are cornered, Zhenya disobeys Vaskov's orders to cover them and instead taunts and lures the Germans away through the forest, as Vaskov did earlier and is killed. Vaskov stays with Rita against her wishes to treat her wounds and promises to take her back to base. She asks him to take care of her son in the neighboring village. After kissing her at her request, he leaves to find a way out, giving her the revolver but soon comes back to find that Rita has shot herself.

The desperate Vaskov, armed only with a knife, one shot in his revolver and a grenade without a fuze, returns to the cabin where the Germans are resting from their wounds. By stabbing a soldier, shooting another and bluffing with the grenade, he captures a submachine gun and forces the remaining Germans to drop their weapons. Vaskov threatens to kill them (Five girls... five young girls were here, only five, and you did not pass! You'll croak here, everyone will croak!.. I'll kill each of you with my own hands... with my own hands! And let them judge me...), but a Soviet radio communique calms him, and he eventually takes the three remaining Germans as prisoners back to Soviet lines. The rest of the women of the regiment, who have come to rescue the group, find Vaskov before he passes out from exhaustion.

Thirty years after the war ends, Vaskov visits the area of the battle again with an officer, implied to be Rita's son. The girl from the beginning arrives with a bouquet of flowers from her boyfriend, only to see that they are at a memorial for the five female soldiers that died there. She leaves the flowers at the memorial and the three of them pay their respects.

== Cast ==
- Andrey Martynov as Senior Sergeant Vaskov
- Yelena Drapeko as Lisa Britschkina
- Yekaterina Markova as Galya Chetvertak (as Ye. Markova)
- Olga Ostroumova as Zhenya Komelkova
- Irina Shevchuk as Rita Osyanina
- Irina Dolganova as Sonia Gurvich (as I. Dolganova)
- Lyudmila Zaytseva as Sergeant Kiryanova
- Alla Meshcheryakova as Maria Nikiforovna
- Igor Kostolevsky as Misha

== Production ==
Director Stanislav Rostotskiy promised himself to make a movie about women in the war after a tank ran over him on the battlefield, and an unknown soldier and a nurse Anna Chugunova saved his life. The novel ...And The Dawns Here Are Quiet by Boris Vasiliev, published in 1969 in the magazine Yunost, caused a great resonance among readers, becoming one of the most popular books about the Great Patriotic War. In 1971, the story was staged at Moscow's Taganka Theater.

Only Olga Ostroumova was quite famous, starring in the film We'll Live Till Monday. For the rest of the actors, the movie became a real debut on the big screen. According to the actors, "such roles fall out once in a lifetime." 26-year-old Andrey Martynov convincingly played the role of foreman Fedot Vaskov (who, according to the text of the book, was 32 years old) and looked much more mature on the screen than his age.

== Filming ==
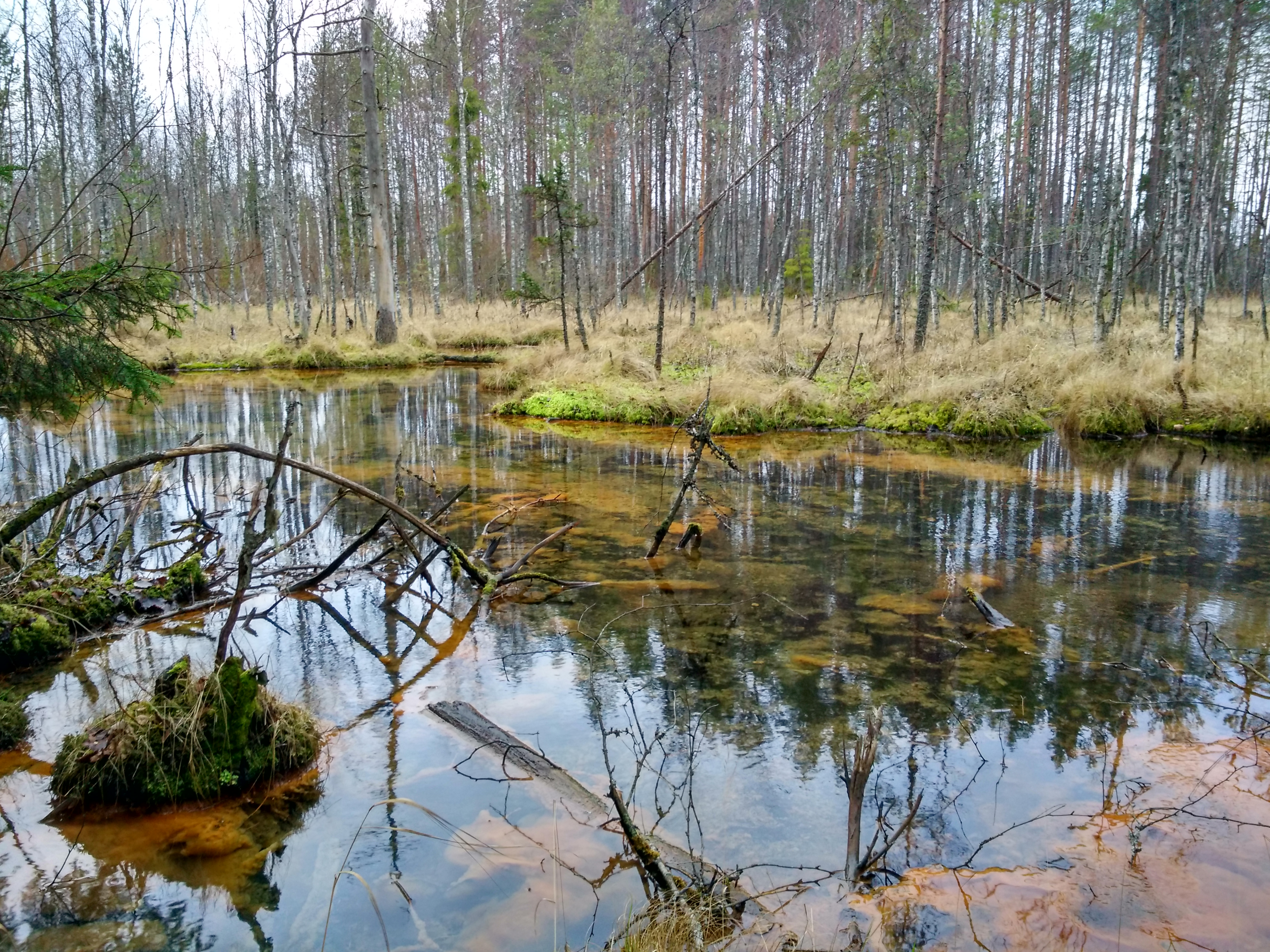
Pryazhinsky District, Karelia, Russia.

Filming began in May 1971 in Karelia and went on daily, from dawn to dusk, without interruption. Filming often took place in harsh conditions - in cold weather, in a real swamp, in deep forests. For Rostotsky, the location of the shooting was of a fundamental nature. The Karelian Isthmus is pitted with craters and showered with fragments of guns of all calibers and ranges, and decades later the war still echoed in these places. Elena Drapeko recalled: "When we played 'war' in my childhood, we played with what was left of it. Some of the finds exploded, and many children from my generation died like that. The war did not go anywhere from here, the whole earth was soaked in iron and blood." She added: "For everyone who shot this film, it was their personal memory. After all, everyone, the director, the cameraman, the artist, even the make–up artist - they were all participants in the Great Patriotic War."

The actors carried bricks in their backpacks so that they would not play fatigue, but actually experience it. Rostotskiy, being disabled on a prosthesis, climbed over rocks, made his way through thickets and sat in a swamp just like the others. Olga Ostroumova recalled how the director often told them: "Don't be sad, guys, we weren't sad in the war, we were young, we fell in love, we wanted to live, we laughed." And we understood him perfectly."

Rostotskiy persuaded the actresses to strip naked for the bathhouse scene. In Soviet cinema of that period, such explicit filming of a naked female body was very rarely allowed, but the director of the picture pursued certain artistic goals. He explained the essence of the scene to the actresses (who had to be persuaded to undress in front of the camera) this way: "Girls, I need to show where the bullets are gonna go. Not into men's bodies, but into women's bodies that are supposed to give birth." He promised that only he and a cameraman would stay in the bathhouse to shoot from a barrel from one point. However, as soon as the women undressed, the cameraman could not stand it and climbed out of the barrel.

The tourist's song was performed by Vladimir Ivashov.

== Awards ==
- The film was nominated for an Academy Award for Best Foreign Language Film in 1972.
- A commemorative prize at the Venice Film Festival (1972).
- The best film of 1972 according to the poll of the "Soviet Screen" magazine.
- The VI All-Union Film Festival in Alma-Ata - The First Prize (1973).
- Lenin Komsomol Prize (1974).
- USSR State Prize in (1975).

== Legacy ==
The film became a classic of Soviet cinema, one of the most beloved folk films dedicated to the theme of war. The film became one of the leaders of the Soviet film distribution in 1973 — it was watched by about 66 million people. In 2002, according to survey by Bashkirov and Partners, it was recognized as the most popular movie about the Great Patriotic War.

In Soviet Russia, the film was among those recommended for viewing as part of the school curriculum. It is included in the educational program of Russian universities specializing in journalism.

The Dawns Here Are Quiet along with How the Steel Was Tempered (1973) is one of the most popular Soviet films in the People's Republic of China. The film was highly appreciated by Deng Xiaoping.

== DVD release ==
The 2004 Ruscico release includes a documentary, "Women's War". Interviewed are actresses Irina Shevchuk, Yelena Drapeko, and Yekaterina Markova.

== Related media ==
- The film was remade in 2015 by director Renat Davletyarov.
- This film had been remade in Tamil as Peraanmai, starring Jayam Ravi.
- The book was filmed the Chinese TV series in 2005 directed by Mao Weining.

== See also ==
- List of submissions to the 45th Academy Awards for Best Foreign Language Film
- List of Soviet submissions for the Academy Award for Best Foreign Language Film
