= Olga Ostroumova =

Soviet and Russian actress

- Ольга Остроумова
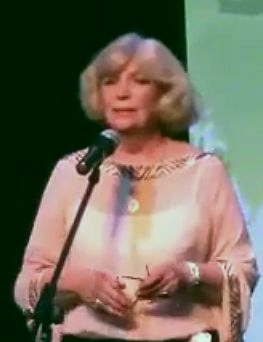
- Ostroumova in 2017
- Born: Olga Mikhailovna Ostroumova; September 21, 1947 (age 79); Buguruslan, Orenburg Oblast, RSFSR, USSR
- Occupation: Actress
- Years active: 1968–present
- Spouse(s): Boris Annaberdiyev (m.1969); Mikhail Levitin (m.1970-1993; 2 children); Valentin Gaft (m.1996-present)
- Children: Olga Levitina (b. 1975); Mikhail Levitin, Jr. (b. 1983)
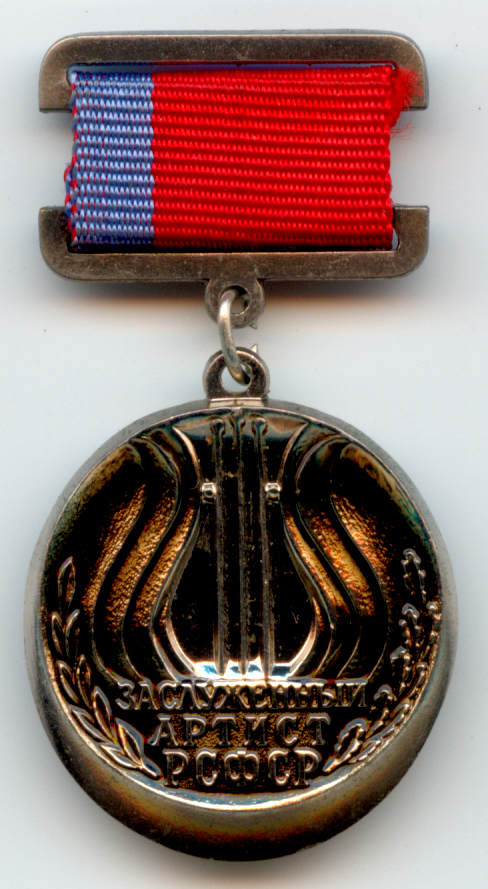
- Awards

Olga Mikhailovna Ostroumova (Russian: О́льга Миха́йловна Остроу́мова; born 21 September 1947) is a Soviet and Russian theater and film actress. She is best known for her roles in films We'll Live Till Monday (1968, her debut), The Dawns Here Are Quiet (1972, Italian Silver Nymph Award), Vasily and Vasilisa (1981).

In 1979 Olga Ostroumova was awarded the USSR State Prize; in 1993 - the title People's Artist of Russia.

== Biography ==
Olga Ostroumova was born in Buguruslan, Orenburg Oblast, Russian SFSR, Soviet Union. In 1970, she graduated from the Russian Academy of Theatre Arts in Moscow. Her film debut as a high school student in Monday Sure Will Come (Доживём до понедельника, 1968) brought her immediate fame among Soviet audiences.

From 1973 to 1983, she worked at the Moscow Theater on Malaya Bronnaya, then moved to Mossovet Theatre, continuing her stage work alongside film and later television roles. She was awarded the title of People's Artist of Russia in 1993. Ostroumova is married to Russian actor Valentin Gaft. She lives and works in Moscow.

== Select filmography ==
- 1968 We'll Live Till Monday as Rita Cherkasova, a pupil
- 1971 Sea on Fire as Yulia Prihodko
- 1972 The Dawns Here Are Quiet as Zhenya Komelkowa
- 1974 Earthly Love as Manya
- 1977 Destiny as Manya Polivanova
- 1979 The Garage as Marina
- 1981 Vasili and Vasilisa as Vasilisa
- 1983 Crazy Day of Engineer Barkasov as Sofochka
- 1987 Tower as Kara Semenovna
- 1987 Filer as Nina
- 1997 Don't Play the Fool as Polina
- 2003-2004 Poor Nastya (TV series) as Maria Alekseyevna Dolgorukaya
- 2004 Women in a game without rules (TV series) as Maria Petrovna Gromova
- 2005-2006 Don't Be Born Pretty (TV series) as Margarita Zhdanova
- 2008 Admiral as Daria Fedorovna Kamenskaya
- 2008 One Night of Love as Daria Matveevna Urusova
- 2012 Yefrosinya (TV series) as Olimpiada Zhuravskaya
- 2014 Pope to Sofia (Mini-series) as Marina
