= Vasili and Vasilisa =

- Russian poster
- Russian: Василий и Василиса
- Directed by: Irina Poplavskaya
- Written by: Irina Poplavskaya; Valentin Rasputin (novel); Vasiliy Solovyov
- Starring: Olga Ostroumova; Mikhail Kononov
- Cinematography: Kadyrzhan Kydrylaliyev; Boris Sutotsky
- Edited by: Vera Ostrinskaya
- Music by: Aleksey Muravlyov
- Production company: Mosfilm
- Release date: November 30, 1981
- Running time: 97 minutes
- Country: Soviet Union
- Language: Russian

Vasili and Vasilisa (Russian: Василий и Василиса, romanized: Vasiliy i Vasilisa) is a 1981 Soviet biographical drama film directed by Irina Poplavskaya.

== Plot ==
Vasily (Mikhail Kononov) and Vasilisa (Olga Ostroumova) had seven children and were a hardworking family, respected by their village. But one day, something changed: Vasily began drinking heavily and struck his devoted wife, causing her to suffer a miscarriage. In response, Vasilisa expelled him to the barn, just before the outbreak of World War II. During the war, two of their sons were killed, and Vasily returned as a decorated war hero with the Order of Glory, yet Vasilisa was unable to forgive him.

== Cast ==
- Olga Ostroumova as Vasilisa Vologzhina
- Mikhail Kononov as Vasili Vologzhin
- Natalya Bondarchuk as Aleksandra
- Maya Bulgakova as Avdotya
- Andrei Rostotsky as Pyotr
- Polina Kutepova as Vologzhin's daughter
- Kseniya Kutepova as Vologzhin's daughter
- Natalya Dikaryova as Tanya
- Tatyana Dogileva as Nastya
- Nikolay Volkov as neighbour
- Georgiy Burkov as narrator (voice)
- Gennadiy Frolov as Sanya
