= From the Life of Fyodor Kuzkin =

1989 Soviet film

- Russian: Из жизни Фёдора Кузькина
- Directed by: Stanislav Rostotsky
- Written by: Stanislav Rostotsky; Boris Mozhayev
- Starring: Aleksandr Susnin; Tatyana Bedova; Sergey Bystritskiy; Denis Borisov; Mikhail Zhigalov
- Cinematography: Vladislav Menshikov
- Edited by: Valentina Mironova
- Music by: Andrei Petrov
- Release date: 1989
- Running time: 182 minute
- Country: Soviet Union
- Language: Russian

From the Life of Fyodor Kuzkin (Russian: Из жизни Фёдора Кузькина) is a 1989 Soviet drama film directed by Stanislav Rostotsky.

== Plot ==
The film tells about the man Fyodor Kuzkin, who went through all the bad weather of the thirties and forties and decided to become the sole person.

== Cast ==
- Aleksandr Susnin as Fyodor Kuzkin
- Tatyana Bedova as Avdotya
- Sergey Bystritskiy
- Denis Borisov
- Mikhail Zhigalov
- Anatoli Borodin
- Pyotr Shcherbakov
- Mikhail Kokshenov
- Pavel Vinnik
- Nikolay Pogodin
- Pyotr Lyubeshkin
