= Tower (1987 film) =

- Russian: Башня
- Directed by: Viktor Tregubovich
- Written by: Aleksandr Aleksandrov
- Starring: Olga Ostroumova; Vadim Lobanov; Georgiy Burkov; Sergey Sazontev; Ivan Agafonov
- Cinematography: Valeri Myulgaut
- Music by: Igor Tsvetkov
- Release date: 1987
- Running time: 89 minute
- Country: Soviet Union
- Language: Russian

Tower (Russian: Башня) is a 1987 Soviet psychological drama film directed by Viktor Tregubovich.

== Plot ==
Near the suburban highway there is a water tower, behind the fence of which the mechanic and his family live. And suddenly they are visited by a Moscow family whose car broke down.

== Cast ==
- Olga Ostroumova as Kara Semenovna
- Vadim Lobanov as Ivan Vasilyevich
- Georgiy Burkov as Sanya
- Sergey Sazontev as Dima
- Ivan Agafonov as Ivan Filippovich
- Raisa Ryazanova as Talia
- Irina Apeksimova as Ksyusha
- Aleksey Yasulovich as Venya
- Svetlana Gaytan as Pasha
