= Badalov =

Badalov is a surname. Notable people with the surname include:

- Andrei Badalov (1962–2025), Russian engineer
- Babi Badalov (born 1959), Azerbaijani visual artist and poet
- Elvin Badalov (born 1995), Russian footballer
- Stepan Badalov (1919–2014), Soviet geologist
