= A Mother's Heart =

- Directed by: Mark Donskoy
- Written by: Irina Donskaya; Zoya Voskresenskaya
- Starring: Yelena Fadeyeva; Daniil Sagal; Nina Menshikova; Rodion Nakhapetov
- Cinematography: Mikhail Yakovich
- Production company: Gorky Film Studio
- Release date: 1965
- Running time: 103 minutes
- Country: Soviet Union
- Language: Russian

A Mother's Heart (Russian: Сердце матери, romanized: Serdtse materi) is a 1965 Soviet historical revolutionary film directed by Mark Donskoy. Donskoy was awarded USSR State Prize for the film in 1968.

The film follows the formative years (1884–1890) of Vladimir Ulyanov growing up in Simbirsk. The film was followed by the sequel, A Mother's Devotion in 1967.

== Plot ==
The film unfolds between 1886 and 1893, portraying the life of Maria Alexandrovna Ulyanova, the resilient mother of Vladimir Lenin, as she navigates the trials and sacrifices faced by her revolutionary family. A cultured and enlightened woman from a prosperous background, Maria Alexandrovna endures the loss of her husband, Ilya Nikolaevich, in 1886, and shoulders the burden of raising her children alone. Her strength is tested further when her eldest son, Alexander, is arrested and executed for his revolutionary activities. At his trial, she sits in the crowd, seeing only her son as he utters his final words, asking for her understanding and forgiveness, a moment that leaves an indelible mark on her.

Maria Alexandrovna continues to support her family through relentless adversity: her daughter Anna is arrested and exiled, her daughter Olga succumbs to illness, and Vladimir falls under police surveillance for participating in student protests. Despite her own pain, she moves with her children to Samara, working tirelessly as she witnesses their growing involvement in underground revolutionary circles. Haunted by Alexander's words about the sacrifices needed for the cause, she resolves to stand by her children as their unwavering supporter. By 1893, as the young Lenin moves to St. Petersburg to embrace the revolutionary struggle, Maria Alexandrovna remains, in his words, a "steadfast ally," embodying the spirit of commitment and love that sustains her family’s radical path.

== Cast ==
- Yelena Fadeyeva as Mariya Aleksandrovna Ulyanova, the Mother
- Daniil Sagal as Ilya Nikolayevich Ulyanov, the Father
- Nina Menshikova as Anna
- Gennadi Chertov as Aleksandr
- Rodion Nakhapetov as Vladimir Lenin
- Nina Vilkovskaya as Olga
- Svetlana Balashova as Mariya
- Vitaly Churkin as Fedka
- Victor Mizin as Gorchilin
- Fyodor Nikitin as Neklyudov
- Vsevolod Safonov as Ishchersky
- Victor Salin as Lionka
- Yuriy Solomin as Dmitri
- Georgi Yepifantsev as Yelizarov
