= A Hero of Our Time (disambiguation) =

A Hero of Our Time (Russian: Герой нашего времени, Geróy náshevo vrémeni) is an 1840 novel by Mikhail Lermontov.

It may also refer to:

- A Hero of Our Time (Pratolini novel) (Italian: Un eroe del nostro tempo), 1947 novel by Vasco Pratolini
- A Hero of Our Times (Italian: Un eroe dei nostri tempi), 1955 Italian comedy film by Mario Monicelli
- Un eroe del nostro tempo, 1960 Italian film by Sergio Capogna starring Marina Berti, adapted from the Pratolini novel
- Hero of Our Time (film) (Russian: Герой нашего времени), 1966 Soviet drama film directed by Stanislav Rostotsky, adapted from the Lermontov novel
- Hero of Our Time, 1996 album by Swedish punk rock band Satanic Surfers
- A Hero of Our Time (TV series), 2006 Russian 8-episode series by Alexander Kott, adapted from the Lermontov novel
- A Hero of Our Time (ballet), 2015 ballet by Ilya Demushkin and Kirill Serebrennikov, adapted from the Lermontov novel
