= The Childhood of Maxim Gorky =

- Original German film poster
- Directed by: Mark Donskoy
- Written by: Mark Donskoy; Maxim Gorky; Ilya Gruzdev
- Produced by: Ivan Stepanov; Soiuzdetfilm
- Starring: Aleksei Lyarsky; Varvara Massalitinova; Mikhail Troyanovsky; Yelizaveta Alekseyeva
- Cinematography: Pyotr Yermolov
- Music by: Lev Shvarts
- Release date: 18 June 1938 (Soviet Union)
- Running time: 98 minutes
- Country: Soviet Union
- Language: Russian

The Childhood of Maxim Gorky (Russian: Детство Горького, romanized: Detstvo Gorkogo, "Gorky's childhood") is a 1938 biopic based on the first part of Russian and Soviet writer Maxim Gorky's three-part autobiography, My Childhood (published 1913–1914). The film shows the earlier years of Alexei Peshkov, better known as Soviet's famous Maxim Gorky; it takes the audience through Alexei's experience at his maternal grandparent's home in the town of Nizhny Novgorod. Alexei interacts with family members, workers of his grandfather's dye factory and local orphan children, all of which impact him.

This film was in 1939 followed by two films covering the second and third parts of his autobiography: My Apprenticeship (based on In the World, published 1916) and My Universities (based on My Universities, published 1923).

== Plot ==
After his father dies, young Alexei (later Maxim Gorky) and his mother Varvara arrive on a boat to live with his mother's parents and brothers. Back at the house, the family celebrates Varvara's return and both Grandmother Akulina and Vanya the Gypsy apprentice who works in grandfather's clothing dye shop engage in lovely Russian folk dances. The party comes to an abrupt halt when Grandfather Vasili arrives. A fight breaks out when Alexei's uncles Mikhail and Yakov argue with their father over division of the dye shop. Alexei hides and watches as they overturn tables and punch each other.

As time passes, it becomes clear that Alexei's uncles resent Alexei because they believe their inheritance will be jeopardized by their sister's widowhood. They enlist Alexei's young cousin Sacha to play tricks on grandfather and Alexei. Luckily, Alexei forms a close bond with Vanya the gypsy. When grandfather loses his temper and beats Alexei, Vanya puts his hand between the whip and Alexei to soften the blows. Alexei sees Vanya as a father figure and is horrified when Vanya dies unexpectedly carrying a heavy stone cross up a hill. Alexei's uncles arranged for this to happen because they were jealous of Vanya's relationship with grandfather. Varvara eventually leaves Alexei in the care of Grandma Akulina so she can go make a new life for herself.

When the dye shop burns down, Alexei and his grandparents move to another town. Grandfather teaches him to read and he befriends a chemist who rents a room from grandfather. An avid reader, he encourages Alexei to learn to write so he can record his grandmother's stories which he describes as quintessentially Russian. He leaves town just before the police arrive to arrest him for incitement against the czar.

Alexei sees his grandfather's brother, Grigori begging on the streets in town. When he lost his eyesight, grandfather refused to support him since he couldn't work anymore. Alexei is beaten up by upper class boys who are picking on a poor man. He realizes that he believes strongly in helping those who have less than him. He makes friends with the poorer kids in town and also Alexei, a paralyzed boy who keeps pet insects to maintain a window to the outside world. Alexei is impressed at his namesake's positive attitude and gives him his pet mouse to add to his collection.

Varvara returns with a fiancé and tells Alexei that after she is married in Moscow, she will bring him to live with her for good so he can go to school. Unhappy with this arrangement, Alexei begins to realize he will have to work to support himself and possibly his mother. Grandfather again loses every thing and they are forced to move again. Alexei begins earning money by sifting through garbage dumps with his friends looking for metal and rags to sell. He earns just enough each day to pay for food for the family. He is disgusted with his grandfather's weakness and greed and impressed with his grandmother's strength. Sensing Alexei's disgust, grandfather kicks him out and tells him to make his own way in the world. He sees his old friend the chemist marching in a chain gang. It is unimplied that he was convicted of crimes against the state, perhaps an early Marxist. He reminds Alexei to learn and write as much as he can. The film ends with grandfather reduced to begging for cake on the street. He is ashamed to bump into his brother Grigori who is also a beggar. Alexei marches off into an open field and waves to friends as he leaves to start his own new life.

== Cast ==
- Aleksei Lyarsky: Aleksei Peshkov (later, Maxim Gorky) (as Alyosha Lyarsky)
- Varvara Massalitinova: Akulina Ivanva Kashirin, grandmother
- Mikhail Troyanovsky: Vasili Vasilyevich Kashirin, grandfather
- Elizaveta Alekseeva: Varvara Kashirina Peshkova, mother (as E. Alekseeva)
- Vyacheslav Novikov: Uncle Yakov Kashirin (as V. Novikov)
- Aleksandr Zhukov: Mikhail Kashirin, an uncle
- K. Zubkov: Old Grigori
- Daniil Sagal: Vanya, aka 'Gypsy'
- Sergey Tikhonravov: The Lodger (as S. Tikhonravov)
- Igor Smirnov: Alexei, aka 'Lenka' or 'Lex', a crippled boy
- E. Mamaev: Sacha Kashirin, nephew
- V. Korochentchikov: Mikhail's son, also named Sacha

== Writing ==
The film was made after Gorky's death in 1936. It takes into consideration that the autobiography was written by an adult and uses the children to help create “witness” which allows for the spectators to view the film with the Soviet interpretation.

Even with the tweaks that the producer made, the film is based on events that Maxim Gorky wrote about in his autobiography. This includes his family drama and other characters that he meets along the way.

== Production ==
Soyuzdetfilm is a film studio that was created specifically to create films for children. It was founded in 1936 inside Moscow in hopes for a “new stage in film entertainment for children (Field 1952, 135)”. Earlier adults would have acted as children in tragic scenes.

Donskoy worked well with the child actors as he did not push them into doing too much rehearsal. He believed that it is important to not overwork the child-actors and prevent having to teach the children too much. If the child is “overtrained” they often overact on camera.

To get the proper emotions, Donskoy would use personal memories to get the actors into the right mood to show strong emotions in the film.

It is said that he would record various scenes without the children realizing they were being filmed.

The film was shot in Nizhny Novgorod, where Gorky spent his childhood.

== Style ==
The film is presented with multiple mini storylines compared to a single story that describes Maxim's childhood. The different scenes are presented with many characters whether they are friends, family members, merchants, beggars, or clowns; the screen showing the different interactions these characters and others have through both dialogue and actions.

== Sound ==
The film uses a soundtrack by Lev Shvarts who worked on all three films of the trilogy among many other films.

This film uses mostly the actors dialogue for sound and even makes use of a guitar in a few scenes to add music to the film. In other words, the sound in the film is diegetic. This includes one of the first scenes where Alexei's grandmother, Akulina, is dancing.

Although the majority of sound in the film is diegetic, there are scenes that use external sound in order to make the transitions between scenes more fluid.

== Reception ==
According to The Times in 2003, “These movies [the Maxim Gorky trilogy] became the staple triple bills of the art-house repertoire until 1956"

The film was received well giving it positive reviews on 18 June 1938 and was a film that was still available three months later in Moscow. Even with the film being based domestically, it was well accepted abroad. This is known due to “the results of critics’ favorite film polls held by influential British film journal, Sight and Sound, where, after the first part was shown in 1943 (Anon. 1955), it figured in the top 12 consistently in the 1950s and 1960s (Anon. 1962), with the 1955 Edinburgh film festival presenting its inaugural “Richard Winnington Film Award” to Donskoi on the basis of his Gorky Trilogy, which was frequently described as “the high point of Russian cinema in the 1930s” (Anon. 1961)"

== Home media ==
An article in 2012 mentions the creation of the film along with Happiness and The Heir to Genghis Khan were made with annotations.

In 1977 a restored version of the film was made and in the new version there was a re-recorded soundtrack.

The idea of Hyperkino DVDs is to have a regular version of the film with subtitles in a number of languages and a second version that allows the audience to press on a number and view text in Russian or English along with images/photographs and videos that relate to the particular scene.

== Influence ==
The film was created after the death of one of Soviets most celebrated novelist Maxim Gorky and based on his autobiography.

This film was one of the first to use children actors the way they were allowing the production company Soiuzdetfilm to continue.

== Notes ==
The Guardian wrote an article in 2011 discussing the fourth Pirates of the Caribbean and lists a top 10 trilogy list with the Gorky Trilogy in 8th.
