= Irina Shevchuk =

Russian actress (1951–2026)

Irina Borisovna Shevchuk (Russian: Ирина Борисовна Шевчук; 6 October 1951 – 24 February 2026) was a Russian actress.

== Life and career ==
Shevchuk, the daughter of the Captain Boris Ivanovich Shevchuk, was born on 6 October 1951 in Murmansk. After graduating from VGIK in 1972, she became an actress at the Dovzhenko Film Studios. Since 1983, Shevchuk has been an actress at the Gorky Film Studio. Throughout her career, she was featured in a number of Soviet and Russian feature films, including The Dawns Here Are Quiet (1972), and White Bim Black Ear (1977).

She was the Vice President of the "Kinoshock" Open Film Festival of CIS and Baltic countries. Since 2000, she was the Vice President of the Russian Film Actors Guild.

Shevchuk died on 24 February 2026, at the age of 74. Brain lymphoma was the cause of death. She was buried at Troyekurovskoye Cemetery.

== Awards ==
- 1974: Honored Artist of the Ukrainian SSR
- 2019: Honored Artist of the Russian Federation
- 2019: Badge of Honor "For Merit in the Development of Culture and Art"
