= Stepan Badalov =

Stepan Tigranovich Badalov
- Born: 26 August 1919; Türkmenabat
- Died: 17 June 2014 (aged 94); Tashkent
- Education: Central Asian Industrial Institute
- Known for: Founder of isotope geochemistry
- Awards: Medal "For the Victory over Germany in the Great Patriotic War 1941–1945", Medal "For Labour Valour", Order of the Patriotic War, USSR State Prize
- Scientific career
- Fields: Mineralogy, Geochemistry
- Institutions: Institute of Geology and Geophysics, Academy of Sciences of the Republic of Uzbekistan; Tashkent State University

Stepan Tigranovich Badalov (26 August 1919 – 17 June 2014) was a Soviet and Uzbek mineralogist and geochemist, Doctor of Geological and Mineralogical Sciences (1962) and Professor (1968). He was a Meritorious Scientist of the Republic of Uzbekistan and an Honorary Member of the Russian Mineralogical Society. He is considered the founder of isotope geochemistry.

== Life ==
Badalov was born on 26 August 1919 in Chorjou city (now Türkmenabat) to a service worker family. His childhood was spent in Kogon and Qo‘qon cities.

In June 1941, he graduated from the Mining Faculty of the Central Asian Industrial Institute in Tashkent with a specialisation in geology and exploration of mineral resources.

From July 1941 to May 1945, he participated in the German-Soviet War (in 1942 as a technician-intendant 2nd rank) and fought at the Stalingrad, fourth Ukrainian and Baltic fronts.

From 1 June 1946, he worked at the Institute of Geology of the Academy of Sciences of the Uzbek SSR (later renamed the Institute of Geology and Geophysics of the Academy of Sciences of the Uzbek SSR; Institute of Geology and Geophysics named after Khabib Abdullaev of the Academy of Sciences of the Republic of Uzbekistan). He went through the path from a postgraduate student to the head of the laboratory of geochemical cycles and processes.

In 1950, he defended his candidate dissertation under the supervision of academician Alexander S. Uklonskiy on the topic "Mineralogy of the Uranium-Vanadium Deposit Temir-Kabuk (northern flank of the Nuratinskiy Mountains)". In 1962, he defended his doctoral dissertation on the topic "Mineralogy, Geochemistry and Genetic Features of Endogenous Deposits of the Almalyk Ore District".

For over 40 years, he taught geochemistry and mineralogy at the geological faculty of the Tashkent State University.

In 1969, he created the "Periodic System of Protoisotopes of Chemical Elements" with their alternation according to atomic weights. He identified about 540 isotopes for 81 stable chemical elements, of which 270 were stable. 3-award

He was the scientific supervisor of 4 doctoral and 42 candidate dissertations, including postgraduates from Vietnam, Mali and Afghanistan. He founded a scientific school in the field of mineralogy and geochemistry of deposits.

== Awards and honours ==
- Medal "For the Victory over Germany in the Great Patriotic War 1941–1945"
- Medal "For Labour Valour"
- Order of the Patriotic War
- USSR State Prize
- The minerals badalovit (IMA 2016–053) and manganobadalovite (IMA 2020–035) are named after him.

== Membership in organisations ==
- 1950 — Russian Mineralogical Society, honorary member of the Russian Mineralogical Society (1992)
- Honorary Chairman of the Mineralogical Society of Uzbekistan
