= Vladimir Kondratiev =

Russian mathematician (1935–2010)

Vladimir Aleksandrovich Kondratiev (Russian: Владимир Александрович Кондратьев; 2 July 1935 – 11 March 2010) was a Russian mathematician and professor. He worked particularly in the field of ordinary differential equations and partial differential equations.

== Prizes ==
- USSR State Prize (1988)
- Petrovsky Prize of the Russian Academy of Sciences (1998)
- Lomonosov Prize of Moscow State University (2009)

== Publications ==
=== Books ===
- Borsuk, Michail; Kondratiev, Vladimir (2006). Elliptic Boundary Value Problems of Second Order in Piecewise Smooth Domains. North-Holland Mathematical Library. Vol. 69. North Holland. ISBN 9780080461731.
