= Truth of Lieutenant Klimov =

Soviet Russian film

- Russian: Правда лейтенанта Климова
- Directed by: Oleg Dashkevich
- Written by: Leonid Krejn
- Starring: Andrei Rostotsky; Yuri Kamorny; Petr Shelokhonov
- Cinematography: Boris Timkovsky
- Music by: Vladlen Chistyakov
- Release date: 1982
- Running time: 90 minutes
- Country: Soviet Union
- Language: Russian

Truth of Lieutenant Klimov (Russian: Правда лейтенанта Климова) is a 1982 Soviet drama film directed by Oleg Dashkevich.

== Plot ==
The film is about Klimov, a naval officer who finds out that his wife has cheated on him with another officer. He publicly hits his rival, as a result of which he is demoted and transferred to the Northern Fleet, where he begins to restore his reputation.

== Cast ==
- Andrei Rostotsky as Lt. Pavel Sergeyevich Klimov
- Yuri Kamorny as Capt. Stepanov
- Pavel Ivanov as Capt. Zabelin
- Petr Shelokhonov as Nikolai Maksimovich Chervonenko (as Peter Shelokhonov)
- Igor Dobryakov
- Yelena Kondulainen as Lyusya, Pavel's wife/ex-wife
- Valeri Doronin
- Andrei Rakhmanov
- Aleksandr Lipov
- Ivan Krasko as Staff Officer
- Boris Khimichev as Admiral
