= Maksim Ovodenko =

Russian scientist (1930–2026)

- Максим Оводенко
- Born: 11 August 1930; Cherkasy, Ukrainian SSR, Soviet Union
- Died: 26 September 2026 (aged 96); Samara, Russia
- Occupations: Metallurgist; scientist
- Years active: 1954–2026
- Awards: Hero of Socialist Labour (1990); Order of Lenin (1981); Order of the October Revolution (1981); Order of the Red Banner of Labour (1981); USSR State Prize (1981); USSR Council of Ministers Prize (1985)

Maksim Borisovich Ovodenko (Russian: Максим Борисович Оводенко; 11 August 1930 – 26 September 2026) was a Russian metallurgist and technical scientist in aircraft engineering. He served as the Director of the Samara Metallurgical Plant from 1984 to 1996 and was also a professor at Samara University. He was awarded the Hero of Socialist Labour in 1990.

== Early life and career ==
Maksim Borisovich Ovodenko was born on 11 August 1930, in Cherkasy, Ukrainian SSR, Soviet Union. His father was killed in 1942 near Stalingrad during World War II. He studied high school at the Ural State Technical University in Yekaterinburg. He then graduated in 1955 with a degree in metallurgical engineering.

Ovodenko began his career in 1955 at the Kamensk-Uralsky Metallurgical Plant in Sverdlovsk Oblast, where he worked for seventeen years. In 1972, he became the Chief Engineer of the Lenin Krasnoyarsk Metallurgical Plant in Krasnoyarsk, where he spent twelve years in his term. In 1984, he became the Director of the Kuibyshev Metallurgical Plant. By 1988, the facility produced 600,000 metric tons of aluminium products. He then served as a professor at Samara University. He authored 27 scientific papers and 47 patents for industrial inventions.

== Personal life and death ==
Ovodenko was married to Angelina Nikolaevna Ovodenko, they had three children together. Angelina later died in 2006.

Ovodenko died on 26 September 2026, at the age of 96.

== Legacy ==
Vyacheslav Fedorishchev, governor of Samara Oblast, announced on his account in Max "I am deeply saddened to report the passing of Maksim Borisovich Ovodenko, Hero of Socialist Labour, Honorary Citizen of the Samara Region, and Honorary Citizen of the City of Samara. A legendary figure, a man of an era".
