= Ali Guliyev =

Azerbaijani scientist

Ali Musa oglu Guliyev (31 May 1912 in Yelizavetpol – 29 January 1989 in Baku) was a Soviet and Azerbaijani scientist.

== Early life ==
In 1943, he defended his Ph.D. thesis on “Obtaining Hexamethylenetetramine (urotropine) from Natural Gas”. In 1945, the Synthesis of Additives Laboratory was organized at the Azerbaijan Scientific-Research Institute of Oil-Processing. Guliyev headed this laboratory. As a result of experiments by him and his team, lubricating additives, Az.SRI depressor and Az.SRI -4 were applied in industry for the first time in the Soviet Union. In 1948 and 1951, Guliyev and his team were awarded two Stalin Prizes (later renamed to The USSR State Prize) for these developments.

== Career ==
Guliyev trained many other scientists. From 1951 to 1960, he was the Chair of Organic Chemistry at Baku State University. From 1960 to 1974, he chaired the department. In 1958, Guliyev was elected a correspondent member of Azerbaijan, and in 1959, an academician of AS of Azerbaijan.

== Recognition ==
Guliyev was elected as a member of the Supreme Soviet of Azerbaijan SSR in VIII and IX convocations. He received two Stalin Prizes and an Azerbaijan SSR State Prize. He was awarded two Orders of the Red Banner of Labour, three Orders of the Badge of Honour and medals, six honorary diplomas of the Supreme Soviet of Azerbaijan SSR, two golden and four silver medals of VDNKh of USSR. The Institute of Chemistry of Additives of AS of Azerbaijan was named after him.
