= KT315 =

Silicon low-power transistor

КТ315 А...И
- Structure: n-p-n
- U_{ce}: 15–60 V
- U_{be}: 6 V
- I_{c}: 50–100 mA
- I_{b}: 50 mA
- P: 100 mW
- P_{max}: 150 mW
- T_{max}, °C: up to 100 °C
- f_{T}: 250 MHz
- h_{21e}: 20–350

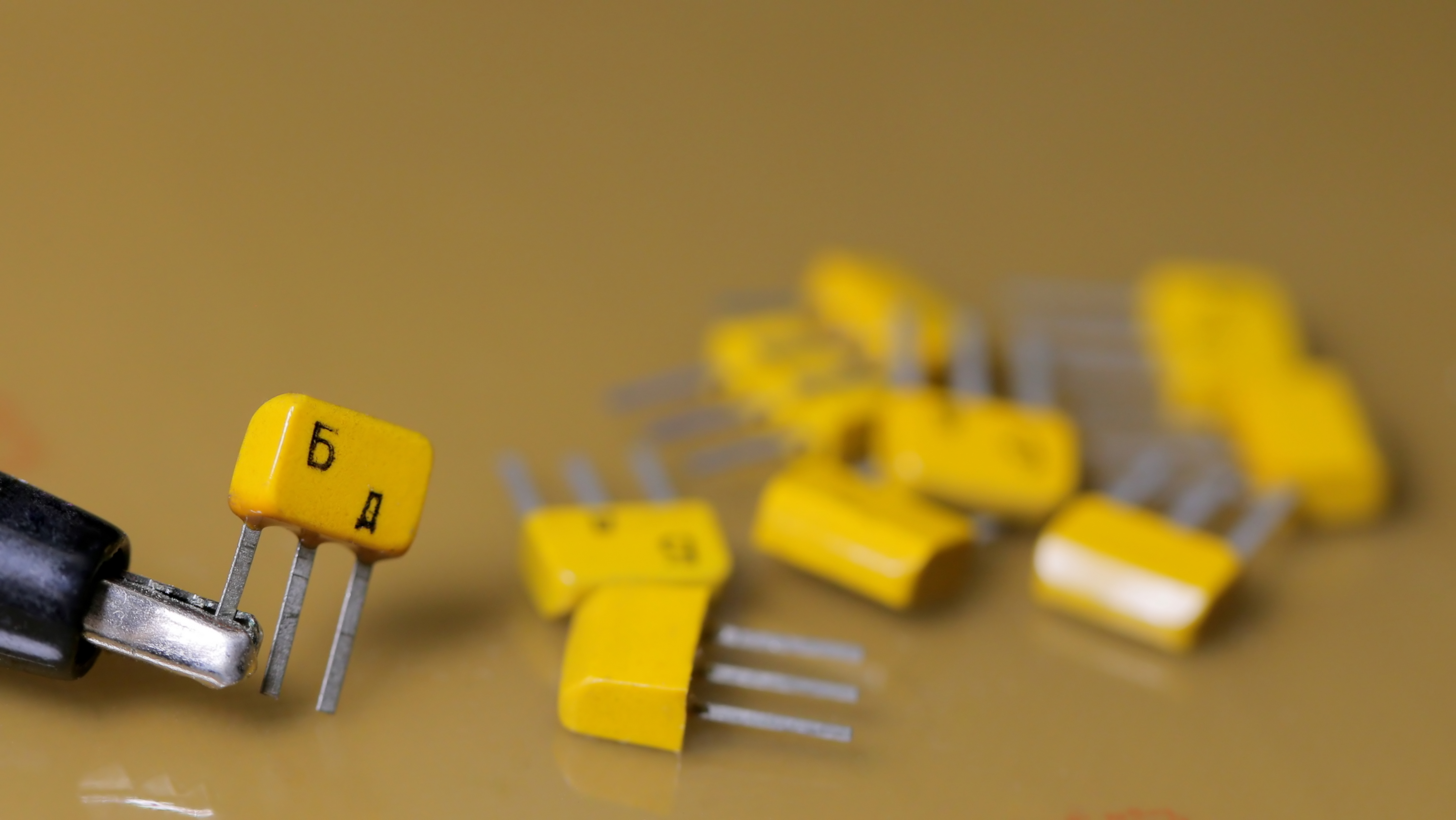
KT315b transistors

The KT315 is a Soviet silicon NPN bipolar junction transistor used for general-purpose low-power amplifying or switching applications, enclosed in the plastic KT-13 package. It was widely used in Soviet electronic equipment. The KT361 is a complementary (PNP) for the KT315 transistor, so it was often paired with it in push-pull stages.

KT315 and KT361 transistors became the first in the USSR, to be produced using planar technology. The characteristics achieved in the KT315 were groundbreaking in Soviet technology at that time. The process of manufacturing was much cheaper than the alloy-junction technology, and the parameters surpassed those of earlier transistor types, in particular, the unity-gain frequency was 250 MHz.

The people associated with the development and mass-production launch of the KT315 were awarded the USSR State Prize for it in 1973.

== Application ==
KT315 transistors were designed for use in high-, medium- and sound-frequency amplifying stages.

== See also ==
- 2N3904 — NPN transistor with slightly better specifications than KT315. Usually can be used as a replacement.
- 2N3906 — PNP transistor with slightly better specifications than KT361. Usually can be used as a replacement.
- Bipolar junction transistor
