= Stanislav Rostotsky =

Soviet film director and screenwriter

- Станислав Ростоцкий
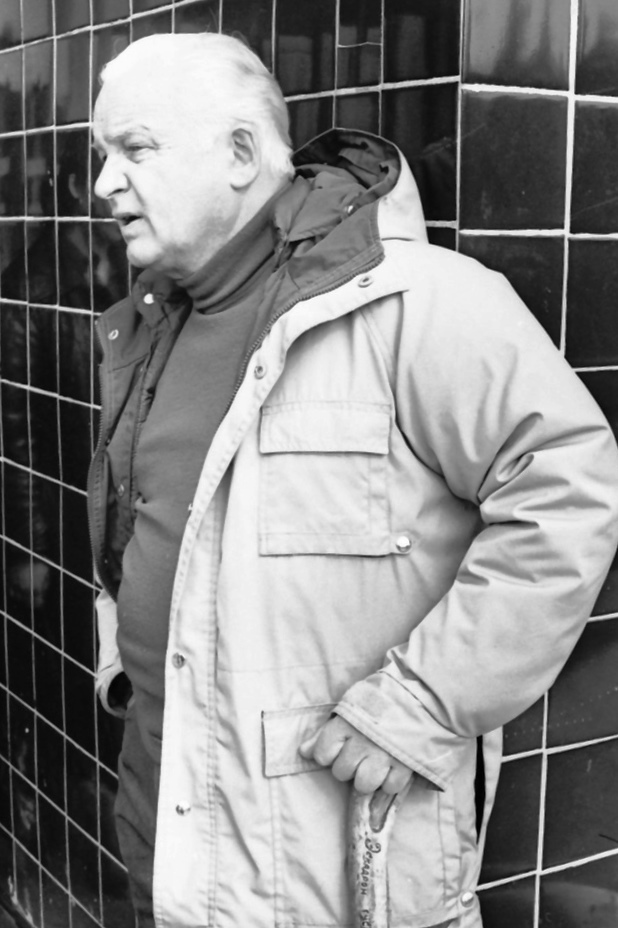
- Born: Stanislav Iosifovich Rostotsky; 21 April 1922; Rybinsk, Russian SFSR
- Died: 10 August 2001 (aged 79); Vyborgsky District, Leningrad Oblast, Russia
- Resting place: Vagankovo Cemetery, Moscow
- Notable work: The Dawns Here Are Quiet (1972); White Bim Black Ear (1977)
- Title: People's Artist of the USSR (1974)
- Spouse: Nina Menshikova
- Awards: USSR State Prize (1970,1975); Lenin Prize (1980)

Stanislav Iosifovich Rostotsky (Russian: Станислав Иосифович Ростоцкий; 21 April 1922 – 10 August 2001) was a Soviet film director, screenwriter and pedagogue. He was named People's Artist of the USSR in 1974.

== Early years ==
Stanislav Rostotsky was born in Rybinsk on 21 April 1922 into a Russian-Polish family. His grandfather Boleslaw Rostotsky served as a General in the Imperial Russian Army and a prosecutor on Emperor's personal order. His father Iosif Boleslawovich Rostotsky (1890—1965) was an acclaimed doctor, docent, author of 200 monographs, as well as a secretary of the Scientific Medical Council at the People's Commissariat for Health. His mother Lidia Karlovna Rostotskaya (1882—1964) was a milliner turned a housewife; she was half-French. His brother Boleslaw Norbert Iosifovich Rostotsky (1912–1981) was a famous theater historian.

At the age of five, Rostotsky watched Battleship Potemkin and became obsessed with cinema. In 1936 he met Sergei Eisenstein and took part in his unfinished film Bezhin Meadow as an actor. Eisenstein became his teacher and good friend later on. He convinced Rostotsky that only a well-read and educated person may become a film director. This influenced his decision to enter the Institute of Philosophy and Literature in 1940, with an intention to enter VGIK.

In 1942 he was enrolled in the Red Army. He left for the front line in a year. He served as a photojournalist in the 6th cavalry corps and traveled from Vyazma through Smolensk to Rivne. In 1944 Rostotsky was seriously injured during the fight near Dubno when he was driven over by a Nazi tank. He survived only due to a trench where his body was partly buried. According to Rostotsky, one of his legs was ruined, as well as his rib cage and his hand. "In addition, a shell fragment hurt me in the head... Good thing the mates took my gun away—otherwise I would've probably shot myself. Because I spent 22 hours lying in that swamp, losing my consciousness, so I had time to think".

He was saved by one of the passing soldiers and then—by a front nurse Anna Chugunova who carried him to the hospital. Rostotsky later dedicated his film The Dawns Here Are Quiet to her. As a result of gangrene he lost one of his legs (a below-knee amputation). He wore a prosthesis, yet never mentioned it and led an active life. Many people working with him didn't even realize he was disabled. He refused to use a walking stick despite the pain, especially during later years.

He was awarded the 1st class Order of the Patriotic War and the Order of the Red Star.

== Career ==
During September 1944, at the age of 22, Rostotsky joined VGIK to become a film director. His teacher was Grigori Kozintsev. He studied for seven years, simultaneously working as Kozintsev's assistant at the Lenfilm studio. In 1952 Rostotsky directed his graduation movie Ways-Roads. During the audition he met his future wife, an actress Nina Menshikova. Rostotsky received good recommendations and was sent to work at the Gorky Film Studio where he spent the next 35 years.

Between 1955 and 1989 Rostotsky directed and co-directed 12 motion pictures, one short film and one documentary Profession: Film Actor (1979) dedicated to his close friend Vyacheslav Tikhonov who started in five of his movies in the leading roles. Unlike many other directors, he cast his wife only once, in a supporting role in the film We'll Live Till Monday (1968). Their son—Andrei Rostotsky, a professional actor and stuntman—was also given only one role in the historical war picture Squadron of Flying Hussars (1980) co-directed by Rostotsky under a pseudonym of Stepan Stepanov. War was a running theme in most of his movies, referred to either directly or indirectly. He was named a People's Artist of the USSR in 1974.

He also served as a teacher at VGIK and the president of the jury at the 9th Moscow International Film Festival in 1975, the 10th Moscow International Film Festival in 1977, the 11th Moscow International Film Festival in 1979, the 12th Moscow International Film Festival in 1981 and the 13th Moscow International Film Festival in 1983. As a journalist he was a regular contributor to a number of film periodicals and biographical books, wrote about Sergei Eisenstein, Grigori Kozintsev, Andrei Moskvin and Leonid Bykov.

A long-time member of the Filmmakers' Union, he lost his place at the board during the infamous V Congress of the Soviet Filmmakers in 1986, being accused of "nepotism" and "political conformism" alongside Lev Kulidzhanov, Sergei Bondarchuk and other top directors. This led to a split, restructuring and further dramatic changes. Many critics and filmmakers consider it to be the start of the decline of the Soviet cinema. Rostotsky himself left the industry after finishing his final film From the Life of Fyodor Kuzkin in 1989. In his later interviews, he told that he had nothing left to say and that he was horrified by the current state of cinema. According to him, young people needed positive emotions, but instead the latest Soviet and Russian films and art in general relied primarily on vulgarity and instincts.

== Late years ==
During the 1990s Rostotsky spent a lot of time at his house near the Gulf of Finland, fishing, as this was his favorite hobby. He turned to cinema only once—to act in the 1998 TV mini-series At Daggers Drawn, an adaptation of the classic novel of the same name (director Aleksandr Orlov). He also took part in the Window on Europe film festival in Vyborg.

Rostotsky died on 10 August 2001 on his way to the festival. He felt a strong pain in the chest and managed to pull the car over. His wife called the ambulance, but the doctors were unable to save him. Stanislav Rostotsky was buried in Moscow in the Vagankovo Cemetery. In just a year his only son Andrei Rostotsky died as he fell down a cliff while making preparations for his new movie.

== Filmography ==
- It Happened in Penkovo (1958)
- May Stars (1959)
- On Seven Winds (1962)
- Hero of Our Time (1966)
- We'll Live Till Monday (1968)
- The Dawns Here Are Quiet (1972)
- White Bim Black Ear (1977)
- Squadron of Flying Hussars (1980)
- Trees Grow on the Stones Too (1985)
- From the Life of Fyodor Kuzkin (1989)

== Awards ==
His 1968 film We'll Live Till Monday won the Golden Prize at the 6th Moscow International Film Festival.

Rostotsky's films The Dawns Here Are Quiet (1972) and White Bim Black Ear (1977) were both nominated for the Academy Award for Best Foreign Language Film, with the latter also winning the Crystal Globe at the Karlovy Vary International Film Festival.
