= A Mother's Devotion =

- Russian: Верность матери
- Directed by: Mark Donskoy
- Written by: Irina Donskaya; Zoya Voskresenskaya
- Starring: Nina Menshikova; Rodion Nakhapetov; Gennadi Chertov; Yuriy Solomin; Tamara Loginova; Aleksandra Moskalyova; Yelmira Kapustina
- Cinematography: Mikhail Yakovich
- Edited by: Mariya Rodionova
- Music by: Rafail Khozak
- Release date: 1966
- Country: Soviet Union
- Language: Russian

A Mother's Devotion (Russian: Верность матери) is a 1966 Soviet biographical drama film directed by Mark Donskoy.

== Plot ==
The film takes place in 1900-1917. The film tells about a woman who begins to understand that her children will become her faithful followers, so she becomes stronger.

== Cast ==
- Nina Menshikova
- Rodion Nakhapetov
- Gennadi Chertov
- Yuriy Solomin
- Tamara Loginova
- Aleksandra Moskalyova
- Yelmira Kapustina
- Nadezhda Fedosova
- Viktor Shakhov
- Georgi Yepifantsev
