= Squadron of Flying Hussars =

1980 Soviet war film

- Russian: Эскадрон гусар летучих
- Directed by: Nikita Khubov; Stanislav Rostotsky
- Written by: Sergei Yermolinsky
- Starring: Andrei Rostotsky; Marina Shimanskaya; Yevgeni Lebedev; Nikolai Yeremenko Jr.; Lidiya Kuznetsova
- Cinematography: Mikhail Yakovich
- Edited by: Galina Shatrova
- Music by: Alexander Zhurbin
- Production company: Gorky Film Studio
- Release date: 1980
- Running time: 164 min.
- Country: Soviet Union
- Language: Russian

Squadron of Flying Hussars (Russian: Эскадрон гусар летучих, romanized: Eskadron gusar letuchikh) is a 1980 Soviet war film directed by Nikita Khubov and Stanislav Rostotsky.

== Plot ==
Denis Davydov, a poet and hero, a man who became a legend during his lifetime, literally conquered his generation. Pushkin, Vyazemsky, Zhukovsky, Baratynsky and many other poets sang in their poems the military and poetic talent, tremendous charm and straightforward nobility, desperate courage and energy of the hussar and partisan, the hero of a glorious and turbulent time for Russia.

== Cast ==
- Andrei Rostotsky as Denis Davydov
- Marina Shimanskaya as Catherine
- Lidiya Kuznetsova as Katerina, a peasant woman
- Yevgeni Lebedev as Mikhail Kutuzov
- Yuri Rychkov as Popov
- Nikolai Yeremenko Jr. as Prince Bolkhovsky
- Andrei Syomin as Mitya Beketov
- Aleksandr Karin as Mikhail Grigorievich Bedryaga
- Aleksandr Zimin as Budelyok
- Vladimir Mashchenko as Colonel Eichen
- Ivan Krasko as Colonel Ustimovich
- Igor Kashintsev as Khrapovitsky
- Boris Klyuyev as French officer
- Fyodor Odinokov as a partisan peasant
- Igor Yasulovich as French tailor
- Georgy Martirosyan as French officer (uncredited)

Songs to verses by Denis Davydov were performed by Alexander Khochinsky
