= Marigolds in Flower =

- Russian: Цветы календулы
- Directed by: Sergey Snezhkin
- Written by: Mikhail Konovalchuk; Sergey Snezhkin
- Produced by: Aleksandr Golutva; Grigori Nikulin; Viktor Sergeev
- Starring: Era Ziganshina; Marina Solopchenko; Kseniya Rappoport; Yulia Sharikova; Lyubov Malinovskaya
- Cinematography: Artyom Melkumyan; Aleksandr Ustinov
- Edited by: Yelena Karelina
- Music by: Aleksandr Knaifel
- Production company: Lenfilm
- Release date: 1998
- Running time: 100 min.
- Country: Russia
- Language: Russian

Marigolds in Flower (Russian: Цветы календулы, romanized: Tsvety kalenduly) is a 1998 Russian drama film directed by Sergey Snezhkin.

== Plot ==
The film tells about the "new Russians" who want to buy a cottage and find themselves in the house of a dead writer, whose family members meet the main characters in different ways.

== Cast ==
- Era Ziganshina as Seraphima
- Marina Solopchenko as Anna (as Marina Salopchenko)
- Kseniya Rappoport as Yelena
- Yulia Sharikova as Masha
- Lyubov Malinovskaya as Inessa Iosifovna
- German Orlov as Billi Bons
- Sergey Dreyden as Nikolai (as Sergey Dontsov)
- Nikolay Lavrov as Rusetsky
- Alexander Tyutryumov as Dzhigurda
- Ivan I. Krasko as Trofimych

== Production ==
The fictional Soviet nomenklatura poet Georgy Platonovich Protasov is a composite character, but the film includes quotes from real works by Soviet poets: an excerpt from Nikolai Tikhonov's poem "Sami" and songs based on the poems of Yevgeny Dolmatovsky "The Danube Wreath" and "Behind the Factory Outpost".

== Reception ==
=== Awards ===
Grand Prix and prize for best acting (acting ensemble: Era Ziganshina, Marina Solopchenko, Ksenia Rappoport, Yulia Sharikova, German Orlov, Sergey Dreyden, Nikolay Lavrov, Alexander Tyutryumov, Lyubov Malinovskaya) at the Russian Film Festival Window to Europe. The Nika Award’98 in the categories: Best Art Direction (Bella Manevich-Kaplan) and Best Costume Design (Larisa Konnikova).

=== Critical response ===
Dmitry Bykov noted: "Certainly, 'Marigolds in Flower' parodies the Chekhovian tradition—but with the significant difference that Snezhkin abandoned the most constructed character from 'The Cherry Orchard', namely Lopakhin, with his business acumen, the actor's slender fingers, his kind heart and his complete inability to understand others. Here, instead of Lopakhin, there are two new Russians". Vechernyaya Moskva newspaper critic Elena Golovanova wrote: "The setting of 'Marigolds in Flower' is awe-inspiring. A whole team of fashion designers and artists worked on the film's design. Hats made of blue wire with bells, dresses made of cobwebs and painted chiffon—the entire film is filled with a multitude of "gadgets" that create a refined, bohemian chic and—well, style. Admittedly, in some places it even goes overboard, but it's not a sin to get carried away".
