= Yuri Chernov =

Russian actor

- Юрий Чернов
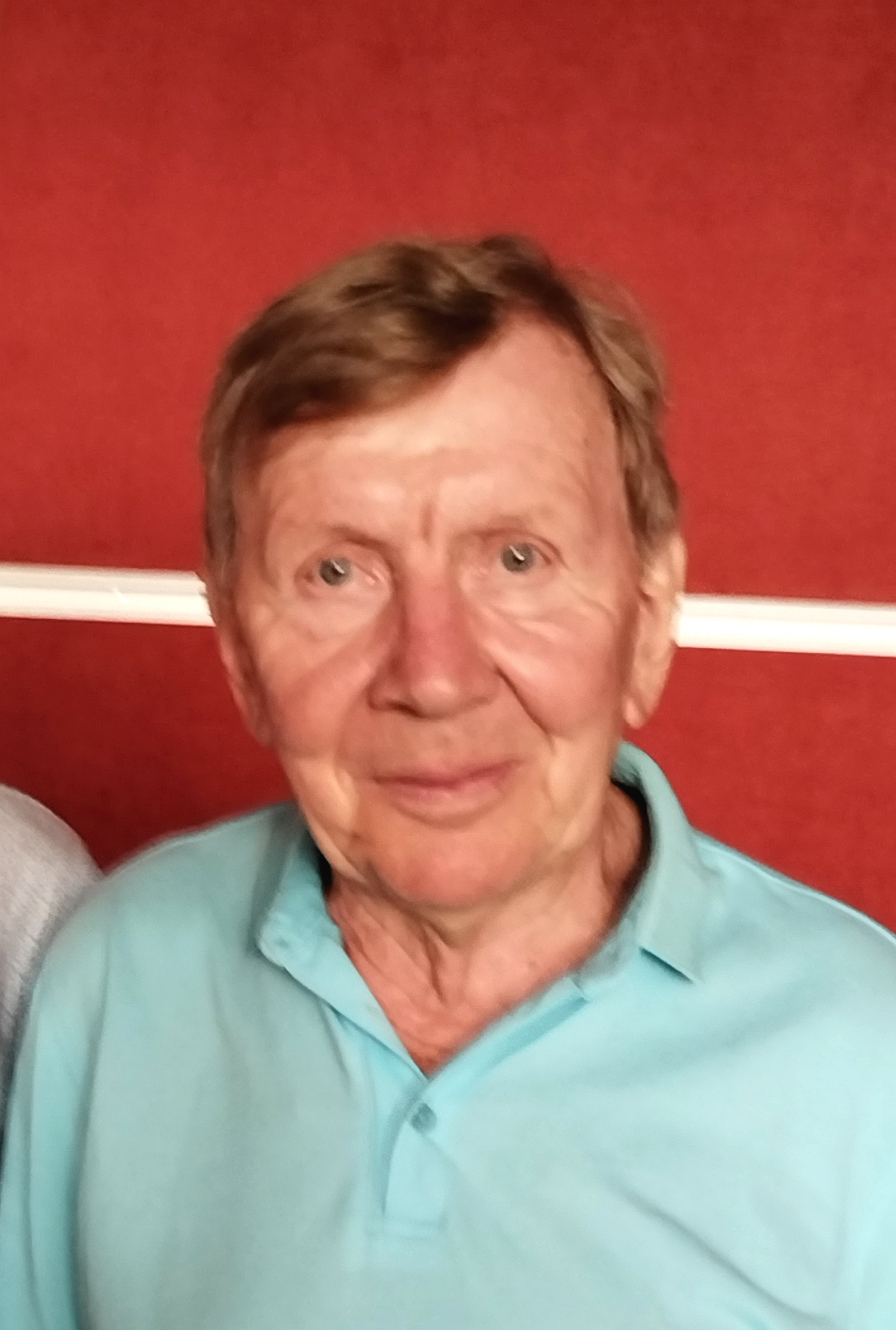
- Chernov in 2025
- Born: 24 April 1949 (age 77); Kuybishev, RSFSR, USSR
- Education: Russian Institute of Theatre Arts
- Occupations: actor; theatre teacher
- Years active: 1968–present
- Spouse: Valentina
- Children: 2
- Awards: People's Artist of Russia

Yury Nikolayevich Chernov (Russian: Юpий Никoлаeвич Чернов; born 24 April 1949) is a Soviet and Russian theatre and film actor, Honored Artist of Russia (1994), and People's Artist of Russia (2008).

== Biography ==
Chernov was born on 24 April 1949 in the city of Kuibyshev. He graduated from the Moscow Circus School and GITIS.

Chernov made his film debut in 1968 in the film We'll Live Till Monday, where he played a high school student, Syromyatnikov. He has acted in film since.

In 1969, he was already approved by the director Vladimir Motyl on the role Petrukha who later became a very popular Soviet action movie White Sun of the Desert, but Chernov chose the circus.

He played in the Moscow Theater of Miniatures, and since 1994, at the Theater of the Moon. Since 2004, he has been an actor of the theater "School of Modern Drama".

From 1995 to 2000, he was a co-host of the game show Wheel of History.

In 1999, together with other well-known artists Victor Merezhko and composer Yevgeny Bednenko, he participated in the project Sing the stars of theater and cinema, where he performed as a singer. The project resulted in concerts and music CDs, released in the United States and dubbed by the Radio MPS.

In addition to film, Chernov acted in the comic newsreels Fitil and Yeralash and was one of the hosts of the popular children's television program Spokoynoy nochi, malyshi!.

He works actively for the Society of the Disabled and is engaged in publishing. He teaches at the Institute of Folk Art (guitar, harmonica, vocals).

Since 2013, he is an actor at the Theater of Satire.

== Personal life ==
Chernov is married and has two children.

== Selected filmography ==
- We'll Live Till Monday (1968)
- Village Detective (1969)
- In the Zone of Special Attention (1978)
- Errors of Youth (1978)
- The Adventures of the Elektronic (1979)
- Along Unknown Paths (1982)
- After the Rain, on Thursday (1985)
- What a Mess! (1995)

== Awards ==
- 29 August 1994, Honored Artist of the Russian Federation for services in the field of cinema.
- 10 January 2008, People's Artist of the Russian Federation for great services in the field of cinema.
