= Bag of the Collector =

- Directed by: Augusto Baltrušaitis
- Written by: Yulia Nikolin
- Starring: Georgi Burkov; Donatas Banionis; Elena Naumkina
- Cinematography: Aleksandr Chechulin
- Edited by: I. Smirnova
- Music by: Edouard Balsis
- Production company: Lenfilm
- Release date: 1979
- Running time: 88 minutes
- Country: Soviet Union
- Language: Russian

Bag of the Collector (Russian: Сумка инкассатора, romanized: Sumka inkassatora) is a 1979 Soviet detective film directed by Augusto Baltrušaitis.

== Plot ==
The investigation group of the Prosecutor's Office of the USSR is charged with the case of the collectors who were burned in a car transporting airport proceeds. It is discovered that the money did not burn in the car but was removed prior to the fire. Traces of a homemade pyrotechnic device are also found at the scene. Additionally, forensic examination reveals that nerve gas was used against the occupants of the vehicle.

The team intensifies its investigation, eventually identifying the culprit as a person previously accused of creating a similar pyrotechnic device. This suspect had orchestrated a car accident involving one of the couriers in the past and used the incident as leverage for blackmail, leading to the fatal crime.

== Cast ==
- Georgi Burkov - Alexander Alexandrovich Sanin
- Donatas Banionis - Alexei Petrovich Tulyakov (voiced by Igor Efimov)
- Elena Naumkina - Margarita Ivanovna Ustinova
- Vytautas Tomkus - Yury Petrovich Borisov
- Natalya Fateyeva - Ksenia Nikolaevna Kovaleva
- Anatoly Solonitsyn - Ivan Timofeevich
- Igor Erelt - Igor Andreevich Peshekhonov
- Mikhail Svetin- Chebotaryov
- Gia Kobakhidze - Norakidze
- M. Sizov - expert
