= Ivan Krasko (actor) =

Russian actor (1930–2025)

- Иван Краско
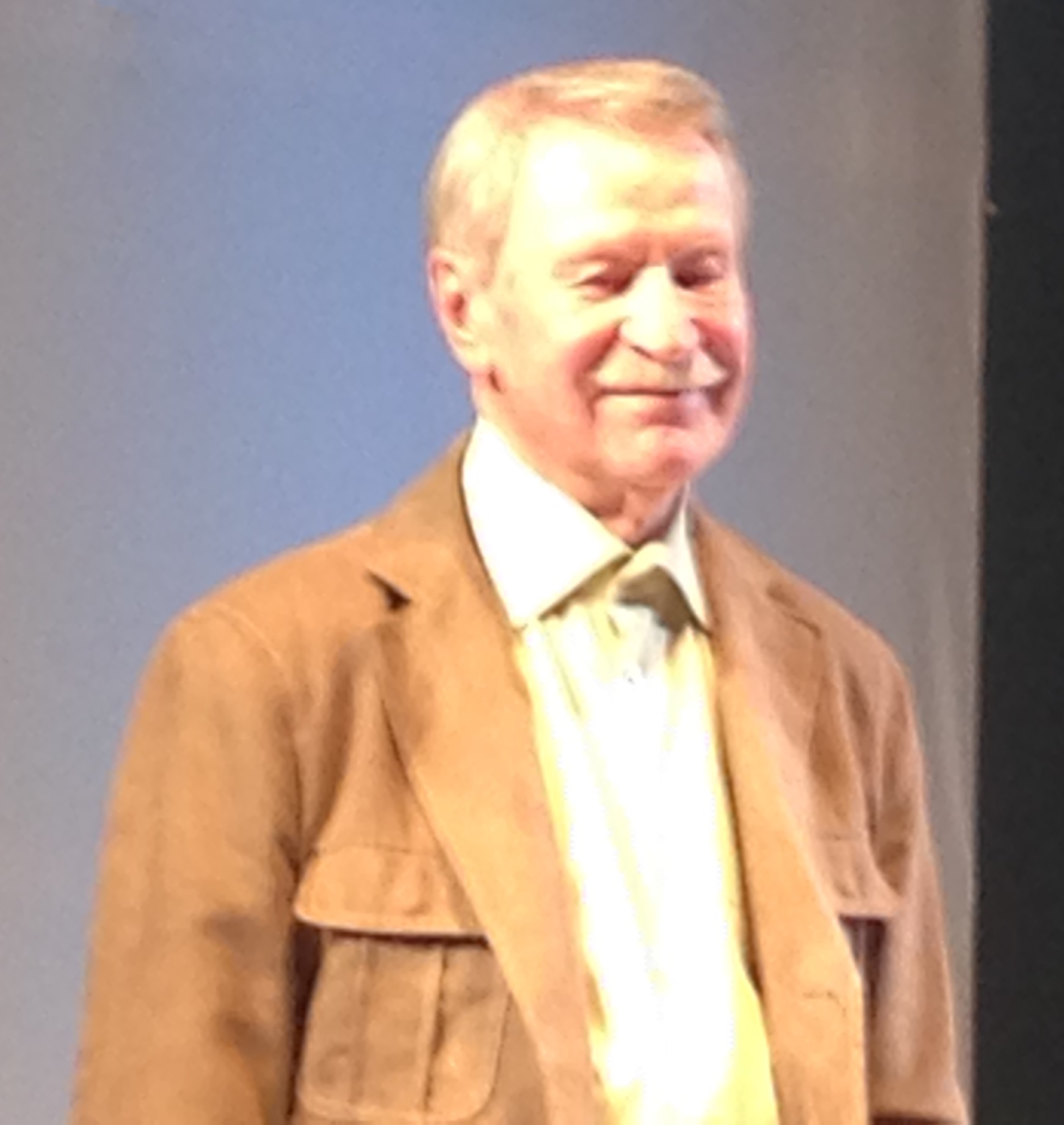
- Krasko in 2015
- Born: Ivan Ivanovich Bakhvalov; 23 September 1930; Vartemyagi, Finnish National Rayon, Leningrad Oblast, Russian SFSR, USSR
- Died: 9 August 2025 (aged 94); Saint Petersburg, Russia
- Occupations: Actor, writer
- Years active: 1961–2020
- Spouses: Yekaterina Ivanova (m. 1951–1955) Kira Petrova (m. 1956–1997) Natalia Vyal (m. 2001–2011) Natalia Shevel (m. 2015–2020)
- Children: 5, including Andrey Krasko

Ivan Ivanovich Krasko (Russian: Иван Иванович Краско; 23 September 1930 – 9 August 2025) was a Soviet and Russian stage and film actor and writer. He was named a People's Artist of Russia (1992).

== Early life and career ==
Krasko was born in an agricultural suburb of Leningrad. His mother, Anastasia Krasko was of Ukrainian and Polish descent, she suddenly died when Ivan was only a ten-month old baby. When Ivan Krasko was five, his father, Ivan Bakhvalov, died of alcoholism. After losing both of his parents at an early age, he was raised by his grandmother who changed his last name from Bakhvalov to Krasko. As a teenager, he survived the Siege of Leningrad during Second World War. In 1953, Ivan Krasko graduated from Leningrad Navy College and served as captain of a patrol boat on the river Danube for one year. From 1954 to 1956 he studied literature and history at the Leningrad State University. From 1957 to 1961 he studied acting at Russian State Institute of Performing Arts, graduating in 1961.

From 1961 to 1965 he was a member of the troupe at Tovstonogov Bolshoi Drama Theater in Leningrad. From 1965 until his death he was a member of the troupe at Komissarzhevskaya Theatre where Ivan Krasko played leading and supporting roles under the leadership of a notable director Ruben Agamirzyan and other directors. Among his stage partners were such actors as Galina Korotkevich, Georgi Korolchuk, Stanislav Landgraf, Mikhail Khrabrov, Yelena Safonova, and Petr Shelokhonov.

His son, Andrey Krasko was also a notable Russian actor.

In 2009, Ivan Krasko co-authored a book of memoirs titled My Вest Friend Petr Shelokhonov, in which he wrote about his best friend Petr Shelokhonov and their partnership on stage, in films, and in life.

== Personal life and death ==
- First wife (1951–1955) — Yekaterina Ivanova. One daughter Galina
- Second wife (1956–1997) — Kira Petrova. Two children: son — actor Andrey Krasko, daughter Julia Svekrovskaya-Krasko (born 1966)
- Third wife (2001–2011) — Natalia Vyal. Two sons: Ivan and Fyodor
- Fourth wife (2015–2018) — Natalia Shevel (born 1990)

In 2022, Krasko said in an interview that he would not oppose the mobilization of his own sons after Russia's military invasion of Ukraine.

Krasko died on 9 August 2025, at the age of 94, after suffering his fourth stroke.

== Filmography ==
- In S. City (1966) – writer
- The Prince and the Pauper (1972) – Miles Hendon
- Squadron of Flying Hussars (1980) – colonel Ustimovich
- Truth of Lieutenant Klimov (1981) – staff officer
- Semyon Dezhnev (1983) – merchant Guselnikov
- The Hobbit (1985) – Gandalf
- The Last Road (1986) – captain Rakeyev
- Mister Designer (1988) – servant
- Afghan Breakdown (1991) – colonel Viktor Nikolayevich
- A Beautiful Stranger (1992) – Grigori Rasputin
- The White Horse (1993) – American
- You Exist... (1993) – traditional healer
- Marigolds in Flower (1998) – bum
- Streets of Broken Lights 2 (1999) – Pavel "Contrabass" Levitin
- Empire Under Attack (2000) – elder Kondraty
- Peculiarities of the National Hunt in Winter Season (2000) – Vladimir Lenin the rescuer
- Little Longnose (2003) – the King (voice)
- Alyosha Popovich and Tugarin Zmey (2004) – Svyatogor (voice)
- Streets of Broken Lights 6 (2004) – Ivan Ivanovich
- Brezhnev (2005) – collective farm chairman
- Female Novel (2005) – Vladislav Petrovich
- The Master and Margarita (2005) – taxi driver
- Taras Bulba (2009) – Kasyan Bovdyug
- Fortress of War (2010) – narrator
- Peter the Great: The Testament (2011) – old man
- The Admirer (2012) – Leo Tolstoy
- The White Guard (2012) – Maksim

== Awards and honours ==
- Honored Artist of the RSFSR (20 December 1976)
- People's Artist of Russia (21 February 1992; first artist to receive that title)
- Order of Honour (2010)
- Jubilee Medal "70 Years of Victory in the Great Patriotic War 1941–1945"
- Golden Mask (2018)
