= Nina Menshikova =

Soviet actress

- Born: 8 August 1928; Moscow, Soviet Union
- Died: 26 December 2007 (aged 79); Moscow, Russia
- Occupation: Actress

Nina Yevgenyevna Menshikova (Russian: Ни́на Евге́ньевна Ме́ньшикова; 8 August 1928 – 26 December 2007) was a Soviet actress.

== Life and career ==
She was the wife of Stanislav Rostotsky and the mother of Andrei Rostotsky.

Nina Menshikova was awarded the title of People's Artist of the RSFSR in 1977 and also received USSR State Prize in 1970 for her performance in We'll Live Till Monday. Her other awards included the Medal "For Valiant Labour in the Great Patriotic War 1941-1945", the Medal "Veteran of Labour" and the Jubilee Medal "50 Years of Victory in the Great Patriotic War 1941-1945".

== Selected filmography ==
- Early Joys (Первые радости, 1956) as Ksana Ragozina
- Ballad of a Soldier (Баллада о солдате, 1959) as telegraph operator
- The Girls (Девчата, 1961) as Vera
- A Mother's Heart (Сердце матери, 1965) as Anna
- A Mother's Devotion (Верность матери, 1966)
- We'll Live Till Monday (Доживём до понедельника, 1968) as Svetlana Mikhailovna
- One Hundred Days After Childhood (Сто дней после детства, 1974) as Ksenia Lvovna
- School Waltz (Школьный вальс, 1978) as Dina's mother
- Visit to Minotaur (Визит к Минотавру, 1987) as Anna Yablonskaya
