= Zoya Voskresenskaya =

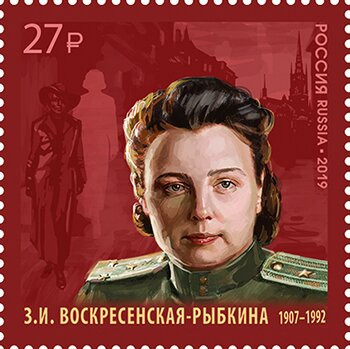
- Voskresenskaya on a 2019 stamp of Russia
- Born: Zoya Ivanovna Voskresenskaya; 28 April 1907; Uzlovaya, Tula Governorate, Russian Empire
- Died: 8 January 1992 (aged 84); Moscow, Russian Federation
- Occupation(s): diplomat NKVD foreign agent author
- Years active: 1930s – 1992
- Spouse: Boris Rybkin
- Awards: Order of Lenin; Order of the Red Banner of Labour; USSR State Prize (1968)

Zoya Ivanovna Voskresenskaya (Russian: Зоя Ивановна Воскресенская; in marriage – Rybkina, Рыбкина; 28 April 1907 – 8 January 1992) was a Soviet diplomat, NKVD foreign office secret agent and, in the 1960s and 70s, a popular author of books for children. A USSR State Prize laureate (1968), Voskresenskaya was best known for her novels Skvoz Ledyanuyu Mglu (Through Icy Haze, 1962) and Serdtse Materi (A Mother's Heart, 1965). Between 1962 and 1980 more than 21 million of her books were sold in the USSR.

In the late 1980s, as Perestroika incited a wave of declassifications, Zoya Voskresenskaya's story was made public. It transpired that a popular children's writer was for 25 years a leading figure in the Soviet intelligence service's foreign department. Voskresenskaya's war-time memoirs Now I Can Tell the Truth came out in 1992, 11 months after the author's death.

== Biography ==
Zoya Voskresenskaya was born in Uzlovaya, Tula Governorate, into the family of a railway station master's deputy, and spent her early years in Aleksin. Her father died when she was ten and mother with her three children moved to Smolensk. At 14 Zoya started working as a librarian at the 48th Cheka battalion of the Smolensk Governorate. Two years later, in 1923, she was commissioned as a tutor and politruk to a local corrective labor colony for young offenders, then got transferred to a regional CP office in Smolensk. In 1928 Voskresenskaya moved to Moscow and in August 1929 joined the OGPU foreign office. Her first post, in 1930, was Harbin in Manchuria; after two years of reconnaissance work she was moved to Riga, Latvia, then Germany and Austria.

In 1935, Voskresenskaya started working in Helsinki, under the guise of 'Irina', an Intourist official, as a Soviet secret agent, in a tandem with an Embassy councilor (and NKVD Colonel) Boris Rybkin, whom she soon married. As the Winter War broke out, Zoya Voskresenskaya returned to Moscow where in the course of the next several years she became one of the Soviet Intelligence service's leading analysts, coordinating the work of several residential groups, including Rote Kapelle in Germany. In 1940, in a secret report she informed Joseph Stalin of the impending invasion by Nazi Germany.

As the Great Patriotic War broke out, Voskresenskaya joined the Pavel Sudoplatov-led group preparing saboteurs and partisan war leaders to be sent to the occupied territories. The first ever reconnaissance unit launched to the USSR Western border was trained by her. Voskresenskaya was preparing to be sent to the occupied territories, under the guise of a railway station guard, when in late 1941, she and Rybkin were sent to Sweden where (as 'Madam Yartseva') she joined the Soviet embassy as Alexandra Kollontai's press attaché.

As a secret agent she continued to coordinate various reconnaissance groups and individual agents, collecting data concerning Nazi Germany's transport maneuvering next to the Swedish border. Both women, working in close co-operation, were later credited for the fact the Sweden remained neutral throughout the war while Finland quit the coalition and in September 1944, signed a peace treaty with the USSR.

After the war, Voskresenskaya continued working in Moscow and in the late 1940s became the head of the Soviet Intelligence's German department. In 1947 her husband Boris Rybkin died, allegedly in a car crash near Prague. Voskresenskaya refused to accept the official version, but failed to get the permission to investigate the case personally.

After Stalin's death in 1953, wide-scale purges of the NKVD ranks started. Outraged with the arrest of Pavel Sudoplatov, Voskresenskaya spoke out openly to defend her former boss. Almost instantly, she received retirement orders but asked for the special privilege of remaining an NKVD officer and was sent to a Vorkuta labour camp as a head of a minor department, in the rank of lieutenant.

=== Literary career ===
In 1955, Voskresenskaya, with the rank of Interior Ministry colonel, retired from service and embarked upon a literary career. Writing for children, she made herself quite a name in the 1960s with novels Skvoz Ledyanuyu Mgly (Through the Icy Haze, 1962), Vstretcha (The Encounter, 1963), Serdtse Materi (A Mother's Heart, 1965, about Maria Ulyanova, which has been adapted for the big screen in 1965), Devochka v Burnom More (Girl in the Stormy Sea, 1969), Dorogoye Imya (The Dear Name, 1970). With 21.6 million copies of her books published in 1962–1980, Zoya Voskresenskaya became one of the leading figures in Soviet children's literature, with several of her books featured in the school lists for extracurricular reading.

In the late 1980s, with most of the Stalin era's Intelligence documents declassified, the story of Voskresenskaya was made public. Already terminally ill, she started writing her memoirs. Teper Ya Mogu Skazat Pravdu (Now I Can Tell the Truth) came out in 1992, 11 months after the author's death on 8 January of that year. She was buried at the Novodevichy Cemetery.

== In popular culture ==
- The Rosa Klebb character in Ian Fleming's From Russia with Love was partly based on Voskresenskaya, about whom he had written an article for The Sunday Times.
