= Foma Gordeyev (film) =

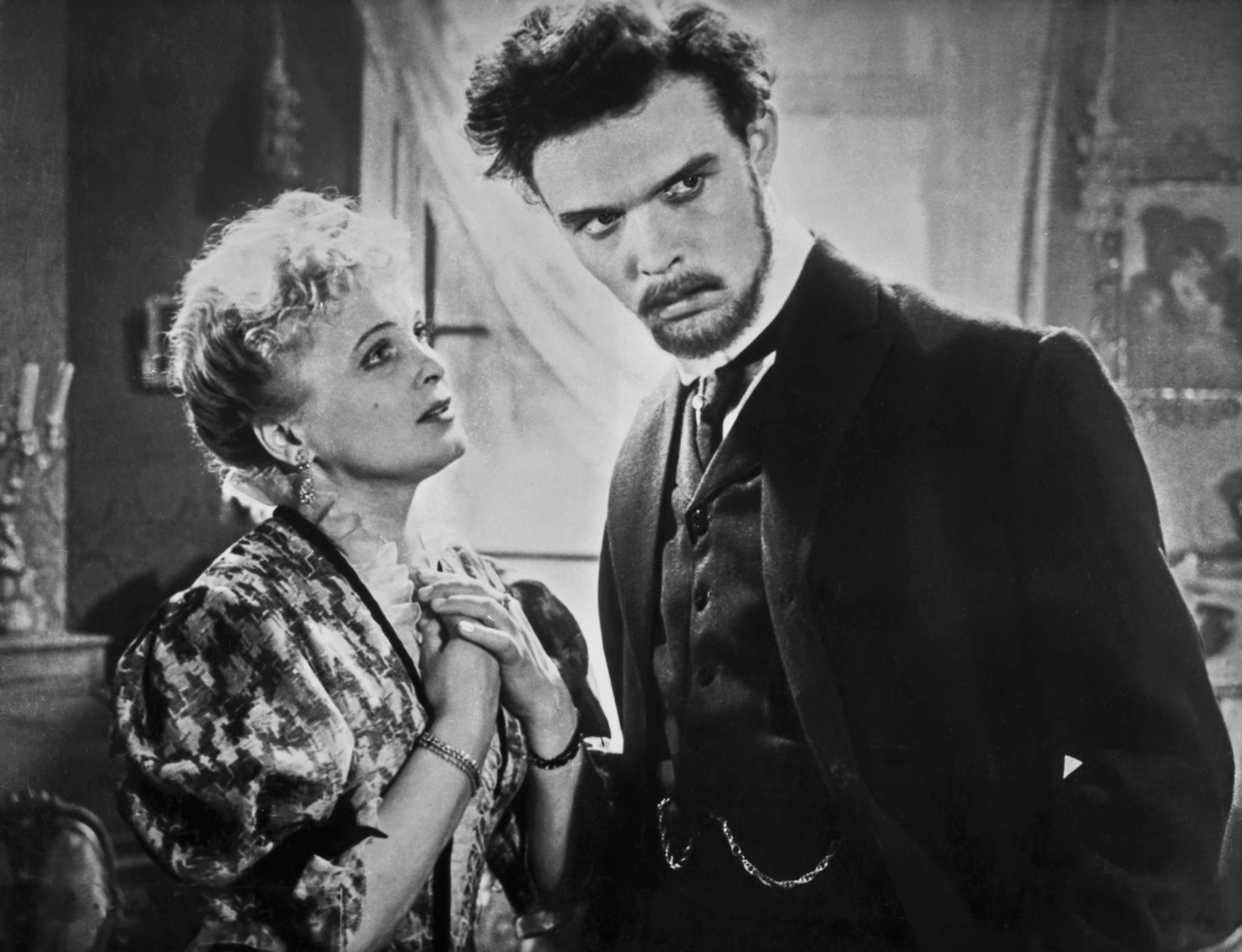
- A still from Foma Gordeyev
- Russian: Фома Гордеев
- Directed by: Mark Donskoy
- Written by: Boris Byalik; Mark Donskoy; Maxim Gorky
- Starring: Sergei Lukyanov; Georgi Yepifantsev; Pavel Tarasov; Alla Labetskaya; Marina Strizhenova
- Cinematography: Margarita Pilikhina
- Edited by: A. Klebanov
- Music by: Lev Shvarts
- Release date: 1959
- Running time: 94 minute
- Country: Soviet Union
- Language: Russian

Foma Gordeyev (Russian: Фома Гордеев) is a 1959 Soviet drama film directed by Mark Donskoy.

The film tells about the son of a rich merchant Foma Gordeyev, who with the help of alcohol tries to come to terms with the injustice of our world.

== Plot ==
The wealthy Volga merchant Ignat Gordeyev celebrates the birth of his son and heir, Foma, but his joy is overshadowed by the death of his wife during childbirth. Foma is sent to be raised by his godfather, Yakov Mayakin.

Six years later, Ignat takes his son back, determined to shape him into a strong, cunning master of life. At school, Foma befriends Kolya Yezhov, a poor but brilliant classmate, and Afrikan Smolin, the son of a tannery owner. However, from a young age, Foma struggles to find his place in the world of his family and peers. After a wild night, his father dies, leaving Foma a great fortune, which fails to bring him happiness or peace. Dissatisfied with the injustice surrounding him, Foma engages in a bitter but futile rebellion against his social class.

Mayakin has him declared legally incompetent, and Foma’s reckless behavior leads to his downfall. Reduced to a vagrant, he ends up in a soup line at a charity home built with his father’s money, a broken man at the bottom of society.

== Cast ==
- Sergei Lukyanov as Ignat Gordeyev
- Georgi Yepifantsev as Foma Gordeyev
- Pavel Tarasov as Yakov Mayakin
- Alla Labetskaya as Lyuba
- Marina Strizhenova as Sasha
- Mariya Milkova as Sofya Pavlovna Medynskaya
- Igor Sretensky as Yezhov
- Gennadiy Sergeev as Smolin
