= Trees Grow on the Stones Too =

- Russian: И на камнях растут деревья
- Directed by: Stanislav Rostotsky; Knut Andersen
- Written by: Aleksandr Aleksandrov; Stanislav Rostotsky; Gennadiy Shumskiy; Yuri Vronsky
- Starring: Aleksandr Timoshkin; Petronella Barker; Tor Stokke; Torgeir Fonnlid; Jon Andresen
- Cinematography: Vyacheslav Shumskiy
- Edited by: L. Korosteleva; Valentina Mironova
- Music by: Egil Monn-Iversen
- Release date: 1985
- Countries: Soviet Union; Norway
- Language: Russian

Trees Grow on the Stones Too (Russian: И на камнях растут деревья) is a 1985 Soviet adventure drama film directed by Knut Andersen and Stanislav Rostotsky.

The film is set in the violent world of 9th-century Viking raids, where a captured Slavic boy must navigate battles, betrayal, and forbidden love as he seeks to reclaim his freedom and identity.

== Plot ==
The film takes place during the Viking raids of the 9th century, around 860 AD. A band of Norwegian Vikings, led by Thorir and Einar, attacks a Slavic village where all the men have perished fighting Danish invaders. The village is impoverished, offering little plunder except for a moose hunted by a young Slavic boy, Kuksha. Although inexperienced, Kuksha bravely challenges the Vikings and fights the formidable berserker Sigurd. While Sigurd dismisses Kuksha as a mere thrall (slave), Thorir recognizes the boy’s potential as a warrior and decides to take him captive. On their journey back to Norway, the Vikings are ambushed by Danish forces led by rival kings Atli and Atsur. In the ensuing battle, Kuksha's ingenuity helps turn the tide by setting one of the Danish ships ablaze, allowing the Norwegians to triumph. Einar dies in combat, and Thorir, grieving the loss of his nephew, adopts Kuksha, renaming him Einar the Lucky.

The Vikings spend the winter in a settlement ruled by King Olav, whose daughter, Signe, falls in love with Kuksha. However, Signe is promised to Sigurd, the most skilled warrior in Thorir's band. Sigurd, a fierce and independent berserker, is ill-suited to the ambitions of Signe's mother, Tyra, who prefers the clever and fortunate Kuksha as a match for her daughter. Tyra and Signe’s brother, Harald, conspire against Sigurd, even resorting to poison and ambush, but Kuksha, valuing honor, thwarts these schemes. Despite Kuksha’s efforts, tensions escalate when Sigurd kills one of his attackers in self-defense, forcing Thorir’s company to flee the settlement. As Harald attempts to hold Kuksha captive, Signe, with the help of a Byzantine scholar named Levius, aids Kuksha in escaping. Tragedy strikes when Harald kills Levius in pursuit, and Signe, torn between love and loyalty, bids Kuksha a tearful farewell.

In the forest, Signe encounters Sigurd and confesses her love for Kuksha, leading to a heated confrontation. In a moment of despair, Signe deliberately throws herself onto Sigurd’s blade, resulting in her death. Grief-stricken, Sigurd is discovered by Harald and his men, setting the stage for further vengeance. Meanwhile, Thorir and Kuksha sail eastward to Gardarike (modern-day Russia), where Thorir plans to leave behind his life as a raider and turn to trade. Kuksha, however, harbors a deep desire to escape and return to his homeland, determined to reclaim his freedom and identity amid the chaos of a war-torn era.

== Cast ==
- Aleksandr Timoshkin as Kuksja
- Petronella Barker as Signy
- Tor Stokke as Torir
- Torgeir Fonnlid as Sigurd
- Jon Andresen as Harald
- Lise Fjeldstad as Tyra
- Viktor Shulgin as Olav (as Viktor Sjulgin)
- Mikhail Gluzskiy as 'Fleinskallen'
- Per Sunderland as Guttorm
- Valentina Titova as Kuksjas mor
