= We'll Live Till Monday =

1968 film

- Film poster
- Directed by: Stanislav Rostotsky
- Written by: Georgi Polonsky
- Produced by: Grigoriy Rimalis
- Starring: Vyacheslav Tikhonov; Irina Pechernikova; Nina Menshikova
- Cinematography: Vyacheslav Shumsky
- Edited by: Valentina Mironova
- Music by: Kirill Molchanov
- Production company: Gorky Film Studio
- Release date: 28 November 1968
- Running time: 106 minutes
- Country: Soviet Union
- Language: Russian

We'll Live Till Monday (Russian: Доживём до понедельника, translit. Dozhivyom do ponedelnika) is a 1968 Soviet romantic drama film directed by Stanislav Rostotsky. It was entered into the 6th Moscow International Film Festival where it won the Golden Prize. The film is about the life of an ordinary Moscow school with all its joys, problems and difficult choices in their lives of students and teachers.

History teacher Ilya Melnikov is familiar with both doubts and feelings of dissatisfaction. Though he is not always right, he fights, loves, and overcomes difficulties and doubts.

== Plot ==
The story spans three days in the life of a ninth-grade class in a typical Soviet high school located in a residential area of Moscow. Natasha Gorelova, a recent graduate, returns to her old school as an English teacher, now known as Natalia Sergeevna. She is joined by her former history teacher, Ilya Semyonovich Melnikov, a respected yet strict educator and former frontline officer. While he is well-regarded by students, his rigid principles lead to frequent conflicts with colleagues and even students’ families. Melnikov’s sternness and inner struggles—disillusionment with societal values, a sense of inadequacy, and unspoken feelings for Natalia—cause him deep personal turmoil. Meanwhile, the head teacher, Svetlana Mikhailovna, is a seasoned and somewhat dry educator who privately resents her unfulfilled life and harbors jealousy towards both Melnikov’s rapport with students and his connection with Natalia. In the classroom, the dynamics between students mirror their teachers’ conflicts: Gena Shestopal’s unrequited love for Rita Cherkasova leads to clashes with the class's charismatic yet cynical leader, Kostya Batishchev.

Over the three days, various interactions expose tensions and hidden feelings. On Thursday, a playful incident with a crow escalates, leading the students to boycott Natalia’s class, only to resolve it later with apologies on both sides. On Friday, sees Melnikov in a difficult confrontation with the school administration, expressing his frustrations about the growing indifference and lack of principles he perceives in society. His devotion to honesty and ideals leaves him isolated from those who find his standards too harsh. Meanwhile, Gena Shestopal, driven by his frustration over unspoken emotions, sneaks into the school after hours to steal and burn his classmates' essays, leaving a poetic note behind. On Saturday, as the incident comes to light, Gena faces possible expulsion, but Melnikov defends him, seeing the act as an expression of youthful rebellion rather than malice. The film culminates in Melnikov’s conflicted farewell at the end of the lesson, where he hints at leaving but then reassures the students it’s only “until Monday,” leaving them to ponder his true meaning.

== Cast ==
- Vyacheslav Tikhonov as Ilya Semyonovich Melnikov — History Teacher
- Irina Pechernikova as Natalya Sergeevna Gorelova — English Language Teacher, former Melnikov's student
- Nina Menshikova as Svetlana Mikhailovna — Russian Language and Literature Teacher
- Mikhail Zimin as Nikolai Borisovich — School Principal
- Nadir Malishevsky as TV Show Host
- Dalvin Shcherbakov as Borya Rudnitsky, former Melnikov's student
- Olga Zhiznyeva as Melnikov's Mother
- Lyudmila Arkharova as Nadya Ogarysheva, pupil
- Valeriy Zubarev as Genka Shestopal, pupil
- Olga Ostroumova as Rita Cherkasova, pupil
- Igor Starygin as Kostya Batishchev, pupil
- Roza Grigoryeva as Sveta Demidova, pupil
- Yuri Chernov as Syromyatnikov, pupil
- Lyubov Sokolova as Levikova
- Arkadi Listarov as Vova Levikov, pupil

== Awards ==
- Soviet Screen Magazine Best 1968 film
- Golden Prize of 6th Moscow International Film Festival, 1969
- USSR State Prize, 1970
