= Almalyk, Republic of Bashkortostan =

Almalyk Алмалык
- Village
- Location within Bashkortostan Location within Russia
- Coordinates: 54°15′N 55°44′E
- Country: Russia
- Region: Bashkortostan
- District: Karmaskalinsky District
- Time zone: UTC+5:00

Almalyk (Russian: Алмалык; Bashkir: Алмалыҡ, Almalıq) is a rural locality (a village) in Buzovyazovsky Selsoviet, Karmaskalinsky District, Bashkortostan, Russia. The population was 236 as of 2010. There are 3 streets.

== Geography ==
Almalyk is located 33 km southwest of Karmaskaly (the district's administrative centre) by road. Buzovyazbash is the nearest rural locality.
