= Gorky 3: My Universities =

1940 Soviet drama film by Mark Donskoy

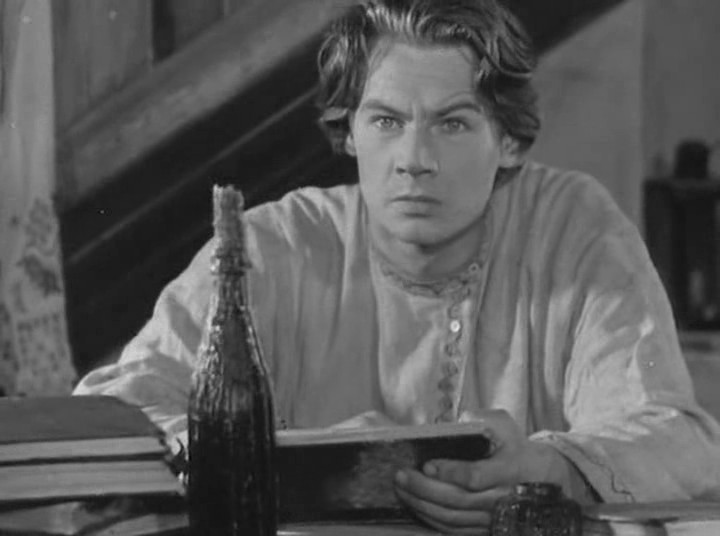
- Screenshot from the movie
- Russian: Мои университеты
- Directed by: Mark Donskoy
- Written by: Mark Donskoy; Maxim Gorky (book); Ilya Gruzdev
- Starring: Nikolai Valbert; Stepan Kayukov; Nikolai Dorokhin; Nikolai Plotnikov; Lev Sverdlin
- Cinematography: Pyotr Yermolov
- Music by: Lev Shvarts
- Release date: 1940
- Country: Soviet Union
- Language: Russian

Gorky 3: My Universities (Russian: Мои университеты) is a 1940 Soviet biographical drama film directed by Mark Donskoy.

== Plot ==
The third part of the trilogy of the life and fate of M. Gorky, based on the autobiographical novel of the same name by the writer. Alyosha Peshkov comes to Kazan to study. The university turns out to be an impossible dream for him, and so he begins to look for a job, and has to live without a shelter. Young Peshkov's thoughts about life are no less difficult than life itself. In a moment of despair, he decides to commit suicide.

== Cast ==
- Nikolai Valbert as Aleksei Pechkov (Gorky) (as N. Valbert)
- Stepan Kayukov as Semenov
- Nikolai Dorokhin as Chatunov
- Nikolai Plotnikov as Nikiforytch
- Lev Sverdlin as The Guardian
- Daniil Sagal as Pletnev
- Mikhail Povolotsky as The Student
- Pavel Shpringfeld as Gratchik
- Vladimir Maruta as Romas
- K. Zubkov as The Beard Baker
- A. Smolko as Pacha the gipsy
- Valentina Dancheva as The Woman (as V. Dancheva)
- Irina Fedotova as Macha
- Pavel Dozhdev as Yacha (as Pavlik Dozhdev)

== See also ==
- The Childhood of Maxim Gorky (first part of trilogy)
