= Georgi Burkov =

Soviet actor

- Георгий Бурков
- Born: Georgi Ivanovich Burkov; 31 May 1933; Perm, Soviet Union
- Died: 19 July 1990 (aged 57); Moscow, Soviet Union
- Occupation: Actor
- Years active: 1965–1990

Georgi Ivanovich Burkov (Russian: Гео́ргий Ива́нович Бурко́в; 31 May 1933 – 19 July 1990) was a Soviet and Russian film actor. He appeared in 70 films between 1967 and 1988. He died on 19 July 1990, at the age of 57 due to thrombosis.

== Selected filmography ==
- Zigzag of Success (Russian: Зигзаг удачи, 1968) as Pyotr
- Liberation (Освобождение, 1970) as sergeant
- Grandads-Robbers (Старики-разбойники, 1971) as Fyodor Fedyaev
- They Fought for Their Country (Они сражались за Родину, 1975) as Alexandr Kopytovskij
- The Irony of Fate (Ирония судьбы, или С лёгким паром!, 1975) as Misha
- Wounded Game (Подранки, 1977) as Sergei Pogartsev
- Office Romance (Служебный роман, 1977) as logistical manager
- The Nose (Нос, 1977) as quarterly warden
- Father Sergius (Отец Сергий, 1978) as merchant
- The Garage (Гараж, 1979) as Vitaly Fetisov
- Takeoff (Взлёт, 1979) as Rokotov
- Kind Men (Добряки, 1979) as Kabachkov
- Bag of the Collector (Сумка инкассатора, 1979) as Alexander Sanin
- The Old New Year (Старый Новый год, 1980) as Pyotr Sebeykin's father-in-law
- Say a Word for the Poor Hussar (О бедном гусаре замолвите слово…, 1981) as Artyuhov
- Vasili and Vasilisa (Василий и Василиса, 1981) as narrator
- Once Upon a Dog (Жил-был пёс, 1982) as dog
- We Weren't Married in Church (Нас венчали не в церкви, 1982) as a man on a cart
- Guest from the Future (Гостья из будущего, 1985) as doctor Alik Borisovich
- Boris Godunov (Борис Годунов, 1986) as Varlaam
- Yolki-palki (Ёлки-палки!, 1988) as chief of the police station
- The Cat Who Walked by Herself (Кошка, которая гуляла сама по себе, 1988) as man, dog
