= Hero of Our Time (film) =

- Russian: Герой нашего времени
- Directed by: Stanislav Rostotsky
- Written by: Stanislav Rostotsky; Mikhail Lermontov
- Produced by: Victor Frejlich
- Starring: Vladimir Ivashov; Aleksey Chernov; Silvia Berova; Svetlana Svetlichnaya; Aleksandr Orlov; Nikolay Burlyaev
- Cinematography: Yuri Postnikov; Vyacheslav Shumskiy
- Edited by: Valentina Mironova
- Music by: Kirill Molchanov
- Production company: Gorky Film Studio
- Release date: 1966
- Running time: 185 min.
- Country: Soviet Union
- Language: Russian

Hero of Our Time (Russian: Герой нашего времени, romanized: Geroy nashego vremeni) is a 1966 Soviet drama film directed by Stanislav Rostotsky.

The film is an adaptation of the eponymous novel by Mikhail Lermontov.

== Plot ==
=== "Bela" ===
The first film of the dilogy takes place in the early 19th century. Pechorin, a Russian officer serving in the Caucasus, falls in love with Bela, the daughter of a local prince. He persuades her brother, Azamat, to help abduct her, offering in return to help Azamat steal a horse from the daring horseman Kazbich. After bringing Bela to his fortress, Pechorin gradually wins her love through persistent courtship.

However, over time, Pechorin grows bored with Bela...

=== "Maxim Maximych. Taman" ===
The second part of the dilogy follows Pechorin’s experiences during his stay on the Taman Peninsula and his service at a Caucasian fortress, where he is accompanied by the kind and loyal old officer Maxim Maximych.

== Cast ==
- Vladimir Ivashov as Pechorin (voiced by Vyacheslav Tikhonov)
- Aleksey Chernov as Maksim Maksimovich
- Silvia Berova as Bela
- Svetlana Svetlichnaya as Undine
- Aleksandr Orlov as Young Officer
- Nikolay Burlyaev as Blind man
- Sofiya Pilyavskaya as Old Woman
- Stanislav Khitrov as Pechorin's Servant
- Boris Savchenko as Yanko

== Critical response ==
Film critic Mikhail Bleiman in Iskusstvo Kino observed:

On the screen, there are simply illustrations for individual episodes of the novel, sometimes simplified, sometimes cinematically embellished. We did not see dramas of a strong character in an insignificant time.
