= Andrei Rostotsky =

Soviet-Russian actor, stunt performer, film director, screenwriter and TV host

- Андрей Ростоцкий
- Born: January 25, 1957; Moscow, USSR
- Died: May 5, 2002 (aged 45); Sochi, Russia
- Occupation: Actor
- Years active: 1975–2002

Andrei Stanislavovich Rostotsky (Russian: Андрей Станиславович Ростоцкий, January 25, 1957 – May 5, 2002) was a Soviet Russian film and theatre actor and stunt performer, film director and screenwriter, and also TV host.

== Biography ==
He was the son of Stanislav Rostotsky and Nina Menshikova. He received his training at the Gerasimov Institute of Cinematography under the direction of Sergei Bondarchuk. He served in the Soviet Army in the Separate Cavalry Regiment (1978-1980). During his service in the army, Rostotsky starred in the film A Squadron of Hussars Volatile. His popularity continues to grow after the role of Anatoly Kharlampiyev - the father of sambo - in the film Invincible shot by Yuri Boretsky in the early 1980s. In 1990, Rostotski signs his first film as a director with the adaptation of the novel by James Fenimore Cooper, The Deerslayer, or The First Warpath where he also plays the main role.

Rostotsky was killed on May 5, 2002, in a climbing accident next to the Maiden Tears Waterfall, where he was looking for the platform for the shooting of his new film My Frontier. He is buried in the Vagankovo Cemetery.

== Selected filmography ==
- 1975 — On the Edge of the World (На край света) as Palchikov
- 1975 — They Fought for Their Country (Они сражались за Родину) as Kochetygov
- 1976 — The Days of the Turbins (Дни Турбиных) as Nikolai Turbin
- 1980 — Late Emperor of Taiga (Конец императора тайги) as Arkady Petrovich Golikov
- 1980 — Squadron of Flying Hussars (Эскадрон гусар летучих) as Denis Davydov
- 1981 — True of Lieutenant Klimov (Правда лейтенанта Климова) as Lieutenant Klimov
- 1983 — Invincible (Непобедимый) as Andrei Khromov
- 1984 — 1st Cavalry Army (Первая конная) as Aleksa Dundić
- 1986 — Breakthrough (Прорыв) as Martynov, head of the mine
- 1989 — Mother (Мать) as Nicholas II of Russia
- 1993 — Dreams (Сны) as Nicholas II of Russia
- 1996 — Whoever Softer (Тот, кто нежнее) as Ramazan
- 2002 — Drongo (Дронго) as Heron

== Awards and honours ==
- Honored Artist of the RSFSR (1991)
