= Sergey Bystritskiy =

Soviet and Russian actor and director (1963–2026)

Sergei Bystritsky
- Сергей Быстрицкий
- Born: Sergei Veniaminovich Bystritsky; 12 June 1963; Moscow, Russian SFSR, USSR
- Died: 1 April 2026 (aged 62); Moscow, Russia
- Citizenship: Russian
- Occupations: Actor; film director; dubbing director; translator

Sergei Veniaminovich Bystritsky (12 June 1963 – 1 April 2026) was a Soviet and Russian film and dubbing actor, director and translator.

== Early life and career ==
Bystritskiy was born in Moscow on 12 June 1963. As a child, he was fond of equestrian sports and graduated from a school with a mathematical bias. He studied at the VTUZ under ZiL (later the Moscow State Industrial University).

His film debut occurred at the age of 13 in an episodic role in the film "Blue Portrait", and he played one of the main roles in the film "Unfinished Lesson" at the age of 16.

In 1986, he graduated from the acting department of VGIK (workshop of Sergei Gerasimov and Tamara Makarova). From 1986, he began working at the Gorky Film Studio.

In total, he appeared in more than 40 films and television series. In 2006, he made his debut as a film director.

He was well known as a dubbing actor and director. He voiced foreign actors such as Matt Damon, Tom Cruise, and Mark Wahlberg. In total, as a dubbing actor, he took part in 225 films and series, and in 21 works, he served as a dubbing director.

Bystritskiy was a member of the Union of Cinematographers of the Russian Federation.

== Personal life and death ==
- Wife — Tatyana Yuryevna Bystritskaya, actress (born 11 March 1967). She starred in the films "Old Women", "With Love, Lily", "Cherub" and "Death by Will".
- Daughter — Polina Sergeyevna Bystritskaya, actress, producer (born 5 October 1992). In 2014, she graduated from the production department of VGIK.

Bystritskiy died from an oncological disease in Moscow, on 1 April 2026, at the age of 62. He was buried at the Alabushevo Cemetery in Zelenograd, on 4 April.
