= Gorky 2: My Apprenticeship =

1939 Soviet film by Mark Donskoy

My Apprenticeship
- Russian: В людях
- Directed by: Mark Donskoy
- Written by: Mark Donskoy; Maxim Gorky (book); Ilya Gruzdev
- Starring: Aleksei Lyarsky; Irina Zarubina; Varvara Massalitinova; Ye. Lilina; Ivan Kudryavtsev
- Cinematography: Pyotr Yermolov
- Music by: Lev Shvarts
- Release date: 1939
- Country: Soviet Union
- Language: Russian

Gorky 2: My Apprenticeship (Russian: В людях, romanized: V lyudyakh) is a 1939 Soviet biographical drama film directed by Mark Donskoy.

== Plot ==
The family is left with no money, and Alexei (Alyosha) Peshkov, kind and honest by nature, is sent by his grandmother to learn the drafting trade with his uncle. However, he is only given menial household tasks and, unable to endure the surrounding injustice, seeks other opportunities. After a failed attempt to join a group of barge haulers due to his frailty, he becomes a dishwasher on the steamboat "Dobry." Despite the cook's support, he is dismissed following false accusations by a thieving waiter.

Alexei then takes up work in an icon-painting workshop, where he grinds pigments and assists in the shop. However, when the clerk suggests he spy on the craftsmen and report back, Alexei's sense of dignity leads him to quit. Homeless and disillusioned, he decides to leave Nizhny Novgorod, seeking his fortune across the vast country, carrying only the small portrait of Mikhail Lermontov's Demon gifted to him by his colleagues.

== Cast ==
- Aleksei Lyarsky as Aleksei Peshkov (later, Maxim Gorky)
- Irina Zarubina as Natalya, the washer-woman
- Varvara Massalitinova as Akulina Ivanovna Kashirina
- Ye. Lilina as Matriona Ivanovna
- Ivan Kudryavtsev as Sergeyev, the son-in-law (as I. Kudryavtsev)
- Nadezhda Berezovskaya as Ivanovna-Sergeyeva, daughter (as N. Berezovskaya)
- Ye. Seleznyov as Viktor Ivanov, son
- Darya Zerkalova as The Rich Woman With Books (segment "like Queen Margo") (as D. Zerkalova)
- Aleksandr Timontayev as Smury, the cook (as A. Timontayev)
- Mikhail Povolotsky as Sergei, the ship's waiter
