= Mark Donskoy =

Soviet film director (1901–1981)

- Марк Донской
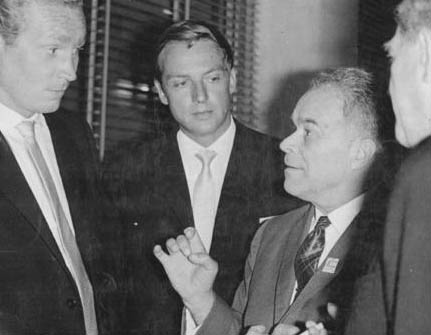
- Donskoy (center) in 1963
- Born: March 6, 1901; Odessa, Russian Empire
- Died: March 21, 1981 (aged 80); Moscow, Russian SFSR, Soviet Union
- Occupations: Film director; screenwriter
- Years active: 1926–1981

Mark Semyonovich Donskoy (Note: Russian: Марк Семёнович Донской, romanized: Mark Semyonovich Donskoy) (6 March [O.S. 21 February] 1901 – 21 March 1981) was a Soviet film director, screenwriter, and studio administrative head.

== Biography ==
Mark Donskoy was born in Odessa in a Jewish family. During the Civil War, he served in the Red Army (1921–1923), and was held captive by the White Russians for ten months. After he was freed, he was discharged from military service.

He studied psychology and psychiatry at the Crimean Medical School. In 1925, he graduated from the legal department of the Faculty of Social Sciences of the Crimean M.V. Frunze University in Simferopol. He worked in investigative bodies, in the Supreme Court of the Ukrainian SSR, and the bar association. He published a collection of short stories drawn from his life called Prisoners (1925).

Donskoy began his career in film in 1926. He worked in the script department, but soon advanced as an assistant director in Moscow. Later, he worked in Leningrad as an editing assistant. In 1935, he became the first Soviet dubbing director; he dubbed the American film The Invisible Man.

Following this, he directed numerous films. He also worked from time to time as a studio administrator: in 1938–1941, and in 1945-1955 he was the administrative director of Soyuzdetfilm's film studio in Moscow; in 1942-1945 and in 1955-1957 he was director of the Kiev film studio; after 1957, he was director and art director of the Maxim Gorky film studio where he mentored Ousmane Sembène.

His wife was the screenwriter Irina Borisovna Donskaya (1918–1983).

== Selected filmography ==
- The Childhood of Maxim Gorky (1938)
- Gorky 2: My Apprenticeship (1939)
- Gorky 3: My Universities (1940)
- How the Steel Was Tempered (1942)
- Fighting Film Album 9 (1942) (aka Diary of a Nazi)
- Rainbow (1944)
- The Taras Family (1945)
- The Village Teacher (1947)
- Alitet Leaves for the Hills (1949)
- Mother (1955)
- At Great Cost/The Horse That Cried (1957)
- Foma Gordeyev (1959)
- Hello, Children! (1962)
- A Mother's Heart (1965)
- A Mother's Devotion (1966)

== Honours and awards ==
- Stalin Prizes:
  - second degree (1941) – for The Childhood of Maxim Gorky (1938) and People (1939)
  - first degree (1946) – for Rainbow (1943)
  - first degree (1948) – for Village Teacher (1947)
- USSR State Prize (1968) – for Heart Mother (1966)
- People's Artist of the USSR (1966)
- Hero of Socialist Labour (1971)
- Order of Lenin (14 April 1944)
- Order of the October Revolution (18 March 1981)
- Order of the Red Banner of Labour (1 February 1939)
- Highest Award of the American Film Critics Association 1944 – for Rainbow
- Award of Daily News – for best foreign film shown in the U.S. in 1944 (Rainbow)
- Grand Prize at the Venice Film Festival 1946 – for The Unvanquished
- Special prize of the Italian journalists Venice IFF 1948 – for My Universities
- Award for Best Director, Film Festival in Paris 1949 – for The Country Teacher
- First Prize in Stockholm International Film Festival 1949 – for My Universities
- Prize R. Unningtona Edinburgh International Film Festival in 1955 – for The Childhood of Maxim Gorky, The People and My Universities
- Prize for best director at the Locarno Film Festival 1960 – for Foma Gordeyev
- Special Diploma in Karlovy Vary International Film Festival 1970 – for Rainbow
