= USSR State Prize =

Soviet Union state award

- Badge of the USSR State Prize
- Awarded for: Outstanding achievements in science, literature, arts, and architecture
- Country: Soviet Union
- Formerly called: State Stalin Prize (1941–1956)
- Reward: 5,000 Soviet rubles (from 1967)
- Established: 9 September 1966; 60 years ago
- Final award: 1991; 35 years ago

Precedence
- Next (higher): Lenin Prize
- Equivalent: Prize of the Council of Ministers of the USSR; State Prize of the Russian Federation
- Next (lower): Lenin Komsomol Prize

The USSR State Prize (Russian: Государственная премия СССР) was one of the Soviet Union's highest civilian honours, awarded from its establishment in September 1966 until the dissolution of the USSR in 1991. It recognised outstanding contributions in the fields of science, mathematics, literature, the arts, and architecture.

== History ==
=== State Stalin Prize (1941–1956) ===
The award traces its origins to the State Stalin Prize (Государственная Сталинская премия), commonly known as the Stalin Prize, which was established in 1941. It honoured achievements in science, technology, literature, and the arts deemed vital to the Soviet war effort and postwar reconstruction. Ceremonies were suspended during 1944–45 and then held twice in 1946 (January for works from 1943–44; June for 1945 works).

=== USSR State Prize (1966–1991) ===
By 1966, the Stalin Prize had fallen out of favour with leadership's de-Stalinization policies. On 9 September 1966 the Supreme Soviet established the USSR State Prize as its direct successor. Recipients of the earlier Stalin Prize had their diplomas and badges reissued under the new name.

From 1967 onward, each annual award carried a cash prize of 5,000 rubles. It was conferred in three degrees (1st, 2nd, 3rd), with higher degrees reflecting greater significance of the contribution.

== Selection process ==
Nominations originated from professional unions or party bodies in each Soviet republic. They were reviewed by the Stalin Prize Committee (later State Prize Committee), followed by screenings in relevant ministries, the Agitprop Department, and finally by the Politburo Commission. Although Soviet leaders retained the theoretical right to override committee decisions, most awards were ratified through this multi-stage process.

== See also ==
- List of recipients of the USSR State Prize
- List of recipients of the Stalin Prize
