= Vadim Yusov =

Soviet and Russian cinematographer and professor (1929-2013)

- Born: Vadim Ivanovich Yusov; 20 April 1929; Klavdino, Leningrad Oblast, Russian SFSR, Soviet Union
- Died: 23 August 2013 (aged 84); Moscow, Russia
- Occupation: Cinematographer
- Years active: 1957—2010
- Spouse: Inna Zelentsova

Vadim Ivanovich Yusov (Russian: Вадим Иванович Юсов; 20 April 1929 – 23 August 2013) was a Soviet and Russian cinematographer and professor at the Gerasimov Institute of Cinematography. He was known for his collaborations with Andrei Tarkovsky on The Steamroller and the Violin, Ivan's Childhood, Andrei Rublev and Solaris, and with Georgiy Daneliya on Walking the Streets of Moscow, Don't Grieve, Hopelessly Lost and Passport. He won a number of Nika Awards and Golden Osella for Ivan Dykhovichny's The Black Monk at the Venice International Film Festival in 1988.

He was a member of the jury at the 1984 Cannes Film Festival and the 45th Berlin International Film Festival in 1995.

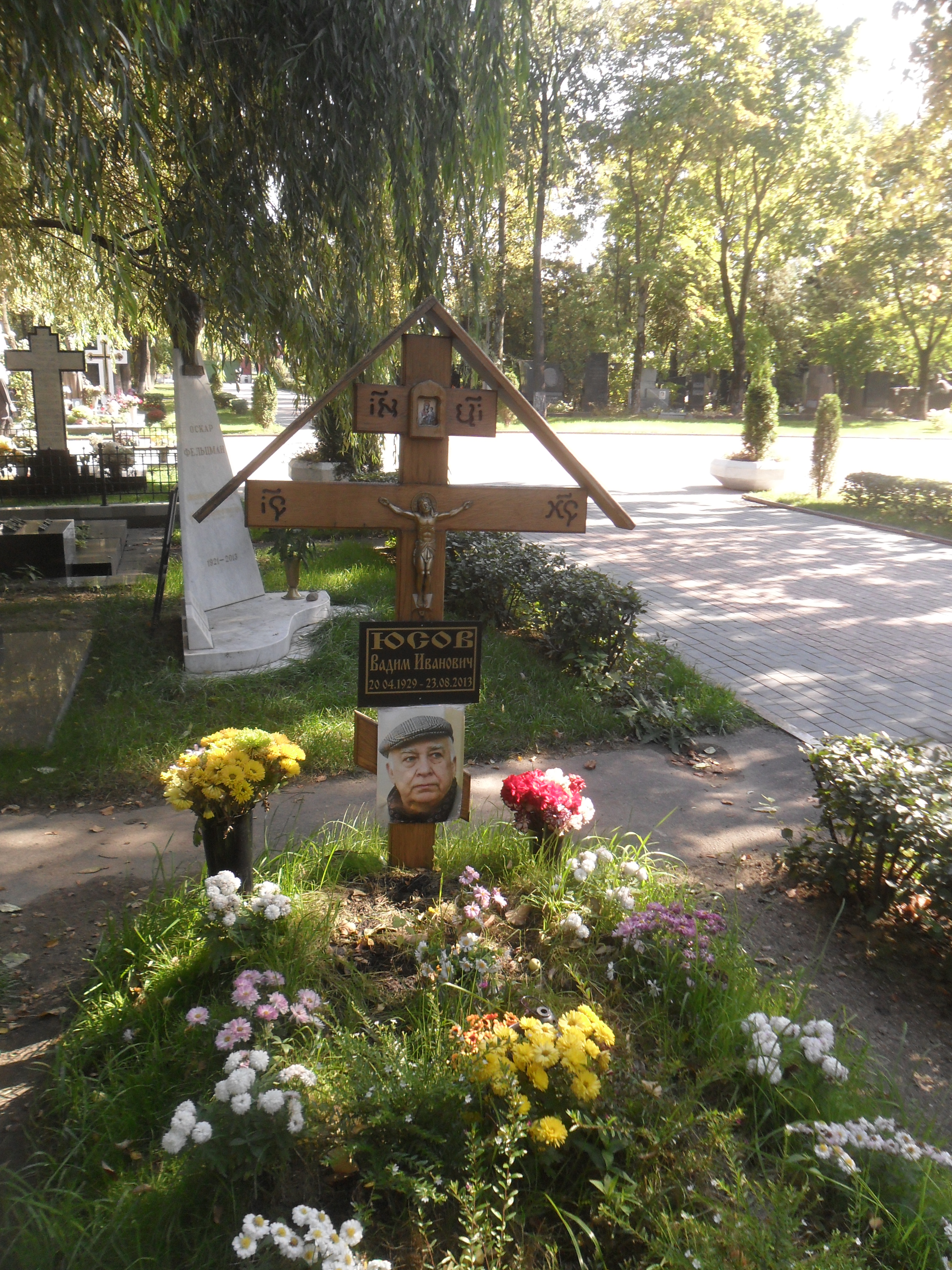
Vadim Yusov's grave on Novodevichy Cemetery

As a cameraman, I deal with the atmosphere, but the reason for this is always the plot, the drama [...] These concepts cannot be opposed, cannot be separated, since one simply does not exist without the other.

== Filmography ==
Cinematographer

- The Steamroller and the Violin (1960); directed by Andrei Tarkovsky
- Ivan's Childhood (1962); directed by Andrei Tarkovsky
- Walking the Streets of Moscow (1963); directed by Georgiy Daneliya
- Andrei Rublev (1966); directed by Andrei Tarkovsky
- Don't Grieve (1969); directed by Georgiy Daneliya
- Solaris (1972); directed by Andrei Tarkovsky
- Hopelessly Lost (1973); directed by Georgiy Daneliya
- They Fought for Their Country (1975); directed by Sergei Bondarchuk
- Yuliya Vrevskaya (1977); directed by Nikola Korabov
- Red Bells (1982); directed by Sergei Bondarchuk
- Red Bells II (1983); directed by Sergei Bondarchuk
- Boris Godunov (1986); directed by Sergei Bondarchuk
- The Black Monk (1988); directed by Ivan Dykhovichny
- Passport (1990); directed by Georgiy Daneliya
- Anna: 6 - 18 (1993); directed by Nikita Mikhalkov
- Out of the Present (1995); directed by Andrei Ujică
- The Kopeck (2002); directed by Ivan Dykhovichny
- Orange Juice (2010); directed by Andrei Proshkin

Screenwriter

- A Very English Murder (1974); directed by Samson Samsonov (together with Edgar Smirnov)
