= Veselin Stoyanov =

Bulgarian composer (1902–1969)

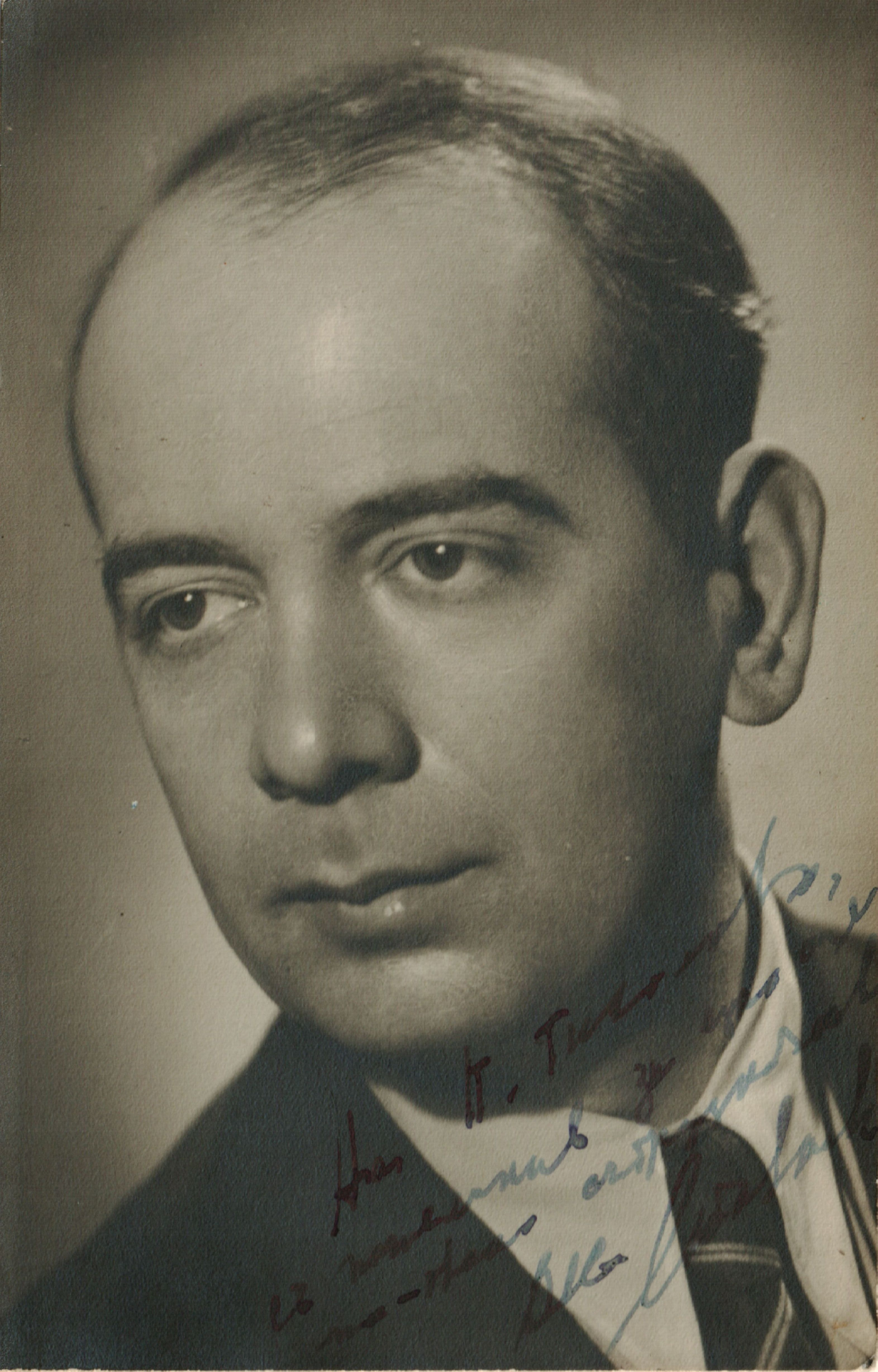
Veselin Stoyanov

Veselin Anastasov Stoyanov (Веселин Анастасов Стоянов) (20 April 1902 in Shumen – 29 June 1969 in Sofia) was a Bulgarian composer.

In 1937, he began teaching and later became professor of music theory courses at the National Academy of Music (Bulgaria). Stoyanov raised the level of music theory teaching in Bulgaria. His students included Todor Popov, Dimitar Petkov, Stefan Remenkov, Alexander Tekeliev, Ivan Marinov and others.

== Works ==
- Three concertos for piano and orchestra (1942, 1953, 1966); Concerto for Violin and Orchestra; Concerto for Cello and Orchestra; Concertino for violin
- Two symphonies; symphonic suite grotesque Bai Ganyo; Festival Overture; symphonic poem Song of Blood; Rhapsody for symphony orchestra
- Operas:
  - Kingdom of Women,
  - Salambo
  - Sly Peter 1958
- Ballet Pope Joanna
- Cantatas
- Songs

== Recordings ==
- Aria from opera Cunning Peter (хитър Петър) on the story of the folk hero Hitar Petar. Krassimira Stoyanova Orfeo
