= Tobacco (film) =

1962 Bulgarian drama film

- Theatrical release poster
- Directed by: Nikola Korabov
- Written by: Nikola Korabov; Dimitar Dimov
- Based on: Tobacco by Dimitar Dimov
- Starring: Nevena Kokanova; Yordan Matev
- Cinematography: Vulo Radev
- Music by: Vassil Kazandjiev
- Distributed by: Boyana Film
- Release date: 5 November 1962
- Running time: 150 minutes
- Country: Bulgaria
- Language: Bulgarian

Tobacco (Bulgarian: Тютюн) is a 1962 Bulgarian drama film written and directed by Nikola Korabov, and based on Dimitar Dimov's 1951 novel of the same name. The film deals with the conflicts and contradictions in Bulgarian society during a period stretching from the early thirties to the end of World War II, and stars Nevena Kokanova as Irina, an aspiring medicine student, and Yordan Matev as Boris, an ambitious man from a working class background. It was selected to compete for the Palme d'Or at the 1963 Cannes Film Festival.

== Background ==
"Dimitar Dimov was called an "erotic" and a "Freudian". He was crushed by criticism. And what did I feel when I had to turn 1500 pages of this novel into a screenplay of 150? It was no less dramatic. I perceived this as a challenge and a kind of adventure that was like "playing with fire"."

— Korabov on working on Tobacco's film adaptation

In August 1951, the publishing house Narodna Kultura received an internal review of Dimitar Dimov's novel Tobacco from the literary critic Pantelei Zarev. In his review, Zarev made recommendations for corrections in the novel, so that it could be accurate to the principles of socialist realism. However, the novel was printed without the recommended corrections.

In the late autumn of the same year, the book was already on the market. Reader interest in Dimov's work exceeded expectations and the book was sold out within days. In January 1952, Dimov was personally congratulated with a letter from Prime Minister Valko Chervenkov. This did not become public knowledge, but word of mouth spread in literary circles, and in the same month, the Union of Bulgarian Writers nominated Tobacco for the Dimitrov Prize.

Other writers were envious and proposed a discussion of the novel's nomination. At the forum itself, Dimov was criticized for "bending" the party doctrine, and in February of the same year, the Literature Front newspaper published several reviews in a row that criticised the novel. Chervenkov attempted to protect Dimov and his work through articles in the Worker's Deed, but literary critics were almost unanimous in their insistence on corrections in the novel. According to some of them, Dimov professed a bourgeois philosophy. Forced by the circumstances, Dimov revised his novel and added 260 new pages, in which he explained the principles of the story from a Marxist point of view.

In 1962, Nikola Korabov began working on a film adaptation of the novel alongside Dimov. Korabov wrote the characters' plot lines, as well as the film's episodes and composition, while Dimov worked on the dialogues. The film's production, however, was also surrounded by controversy.

When word spread around that Nevena Kokanova would play Irina, the Arts Council expressed its disapproval. At that time, she was a trainee actress at the Yambol Theatre, with one or two small roles. Some described Korabov's decision to cast her as "crazy", while Kokanova herself was described as "unprepossessing". Kokanova ultimately portrayed the character which was her breakout role.

== Plot ==
Boris, Pavel and Stefan are the sons of a poor Latin teacher in the countryside. Boris is ambitious and dreams of money and power, while his younger brothers are communists, devoted to the cause and the party. Boris meets Irina at a grape harvest and falls in love with her, while Pavel falls in love with her friend Lila, who is also a member of the Communist Party. Irina's father is a senior guard from the district administration. When she leaves the countryside to study medicine in Sofia, Boris marries Maria, the daughter of the owner of the Nicotiana tobacco factory.

After Maria's father dies, Boris inherits the factory and becomes rich. However, his wife's health is gradually deteriorating, she is mentally ill and cannot recognise the people around her. Irina and Boris became lovers, and after Maria's death, they get married. Shortly before that, Irina's father is killed during a strike at the factory.

Boris makes deals with German entrepreneurs, while Sofia is bombed by the Allies, and Irina becomes increasingly aware of his true nature. World War II is coming to an end and Boris plans a big deal with a Greek merchant. Its success depends on von Geyer, the general director of a German tobacco concern. Boris asks Irina to seduce him. Attracted by the Nietzschean philosophy and von Geyer's aristocracy, Irina becomes his lover. The three go to Greece where Boris arranges the biggest deal of his life. Exhausted by alcohol, he contracts malaria and dies.

As the English army advances, the partisans go into open combat actions. On 9 September 1944, Irina buries Boris in the place where they first met. A shot rings out.

== Cast ==
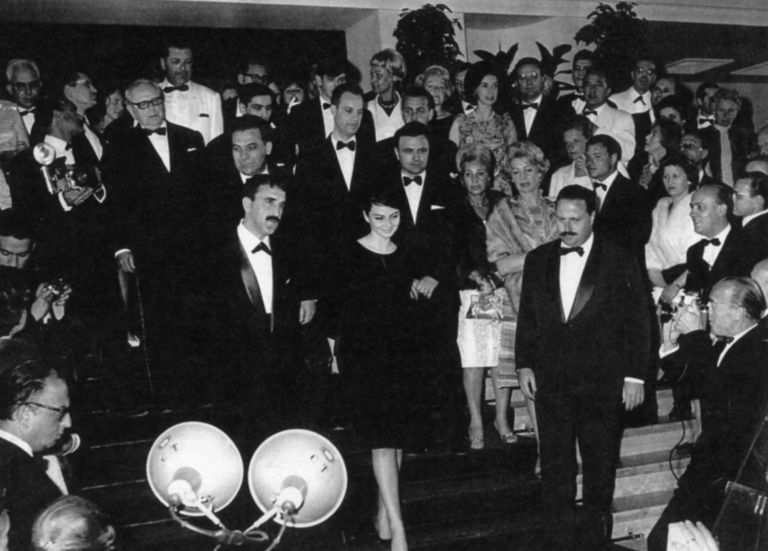
Korabov and Kokanova on the red carpet at the 1963 Cannes Film Festival before the screening of Tobacco

- Nevena Kokanova as Irina
- Yordan Matev as Boris Morev
- Miroslava Stoyanova as Lila
- Ivan Kasabov as Pavel Morev
- Nikola Popov as Shishko
- Stefan Pejchev as Kostov
- Peter Slabakov as Dinko
- Luna Davidova as Varvara
- Wolfgang Langhoff as von Geyer
- Georgi Stamatov as Father Pier
- Ivan Dimov as Barutchiev
- Magda Kolchakova as Spasuna
- Tzvetana Ostrovska as Maria
- Georgi Kaloyanchev as a partisan
- Stefan Petrov
- Grigor Vachkov
- Gencho Dimitrov
- Nikola Dadov
- Konstantin Dimchev
- Georgi Radinevski
- Nikolai Doychev

== Accolades ==
Award	Date of ceremony	Category	Recipient(s)	Result	Ref(s)
Cannes Film Festival	23 May 1963	Palme d'Or	Tobacco	Nominated	
Golden Rose Film Festival	14 August 1963	Best Actress	Nevena Kokanova	Won	
Golden Rose Film Festival	14 August 1963	Special Jury Award	Nikola Korabov, Vulo Radev	Won	
