= Trapeznikov =

Trapeznikov, feminine: Trapeznikova is a Russian surname. Notable people with the surname include:

- Alena Trapeznikova
- Dmitry Trapeznikov (born 1981), Russian politician
- Margarita Trapeznikova (1929–2013), Russian urologist and professor
- Tatyana Trapeznikova
- Vladimir Trapeznikov (born 1956), Russian cinematographer
