= Tobacco (novel) =

1951 novel by Dimitar Dimov

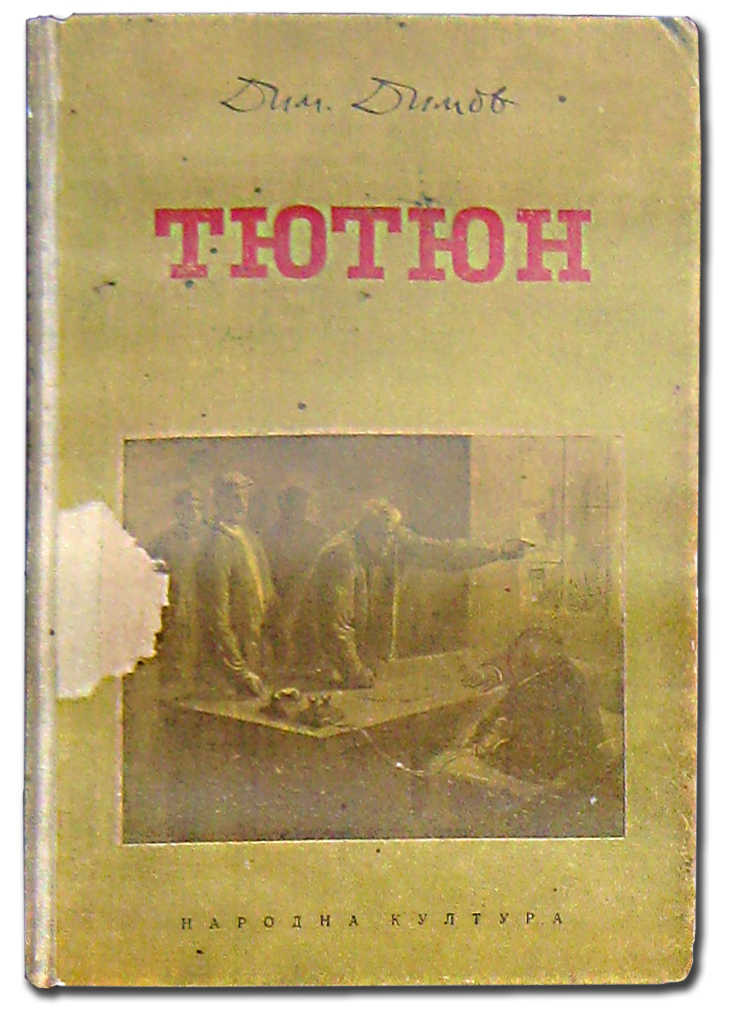
- Author: Dimitar Dimov
- Original title: Тютюн
- Language: Bulgarian
- Genre: Novel
- Set in: Bulgaria
- Publication date: 1951
- Publication place: Bulgaria
- Media type: Print
- Preceded by: Lieutenant Benz; Damned Souls

Tobacco (Bulgarian: Тютюн) is a 20th-century novel written by Dimitar Dimov, a Bulgarian novelist and veterinary surgeon. It was written between 1946 and 1949, and published for the first time in 1951. Much of the inspiration for the novel came from the author's time in Plovdiv, where he spoke with workers, managers, and merchants working in tobacco warehouses.

Only a few copies of the novel survive today. Just 4,000 copies of the first edition were printed, and currently, only a handful of second-hand copies remain on the market. In fact, the novel holds the record for the most expensive second-hand book in Bulgaria. A copy of the first edition today costs up to 1,200 leva.

== Synopsis ==
Tobacco is set in the early 20th century. It explores the lives of several characters in the tobacco industry. The novel delves into the characters’ personal lives against the backdrop of political unrest and turmoil. The themes of class struggles, corruption, and social upheavals are also a major part of the narrative. The book is often interpreted as a metaphor of how greed and ambition can destroy happiness, love, and relationships.

== Plot summary ==
Dimov's Tobacco follows the complex lives of several characters connected to a major tobacco factory in pre-Socialist Bulgaria. The central figure is Boris, a young man from a poor background with big ambitions to rise above his station. He leaves his first love, Irina, to marry Maria, a wealthy heiress of the tobacco factory. His ambition drives him to take control of the business after the death of Maria's father, and he becomes ruthless and misguided in his pursuit of wealth and power.

Boris's marriage to Maria begins to crumble as her mental health deteriorates under the pressure of their loveless union. Despite her struggles, Boris remains focused on his business ambitions. Maria eventually descends into insanity and passes away.

With her death, Boris is free to marry and goes back to his first love. By this time, Irina is a doctor and an independent woman dedicated to her profession. However, she's soon tempted by the luxurious life Boris presents. Their marriage soon begins to suffer as Irina becomes increasingly aware of Boris's true nature when he asks her to seduce the director of a German tobacco business. She eventually becomes his lover, and Boris dies after closing one of the biggest deals in his career.

== Themes ==
=== Love ===
Love is a central theme in the novel, portrayed through tumultuous relationships, love affairs, and loveless marriages.

When Boris returns to his first love, Irina, the relationship quickly sours due to Boris's selfishness and greed.

=== Ambition and Betrayal ===
Ambition, betrayal, and greed are key themes that run throughout the novel. The main character's ambition to escape poverty and become a powerful tycoon in the tobacco industry ultimately leads to the ruin of his relationship with Irina. As he reaches the peak of his career he develops alcoholism, eventually contracting malaria and dying. Ultimately, his ambition causes him to become ruthless to his loved ones. On his path to success, Boris becomes void of a moral compass and sacrifices everything for power and success.

== Reception ==
The author was made to rewrite Tobacco twice, under the instructions of the Communist Party. Parts of his novel were published in periodicals as he was writing it, and the publishing house initially rejected it. Later, it was accepted by the publishing house ‘Narodna Kultura’.

When the novel was first published in 1951 it made a turbulent appearance on the literary scene, initially facing harsh criticism. The novel was criticised for its bourgeois thinking, decadent traits of capitalist literature, and erotic influences.

== Film Adaptations ==
The novel was adapted into a Bulgarian drama film, Tobacco, in 1962. The film, written and directed by Nikola Korabov, is based on the story, starring Nevena Kokanova as Irina and Yordan Matev as Boris.
