= Wolfgang Langhoff =

German theatre, film and television actor and theatre director (1901–1966)

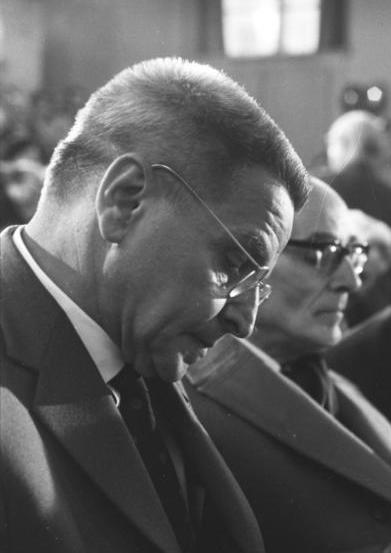
Langhoff in 1962

Wolfgang Langhoff (6 October 1901 in Berlin, German Empire – 26 August 1966 in Berlin, German Democratic Republic) was a German theatre, film and television actor and theatre director.

== Early career ==
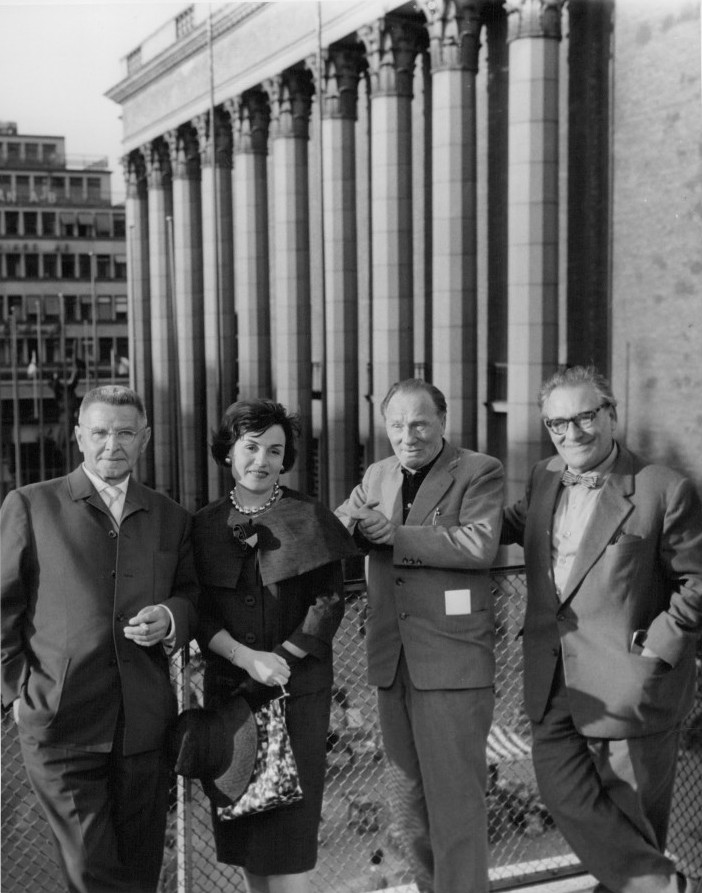
From left: Langhoff, Gisela May, Ernst Busch and Wolfgang Heinz of the Deutsches Theater in Stockholm in 1960

From 1923 Langhoff worked at the Thalia Theater in Hamburg, and in Wiesbaden. In 1926 he married the actress Renate Edwina Malacrida, who bore him two children, Thomas (1938–2012) and Matthias (1942). From 1928 to 1932 he played at the Schauspielhaus in Düsseldorf and then from 1932 to 1933 at the Grand Theatre in Düsseldorf. Langhoff was involved at this time with the German Communist Party and was the artistic director of the agitprop troupe "ran northwest," founded in 1930, which performed at union events. The dancer Hilarius Gilges was one of its members.

Langhoff was arrested by the Gestapo in February 1933 and initially detained in the Düsseldorf jail, where he was subjected to severe torture by the SA. A few days later he was transferred to the "Ulmer Höh" prison. In July 1933 he was taken to concentration camp Börgermoor, in Emsland. While there he revised a song lyric written by Johann Esser, creating what was later to become the famous protest song Peat Bog Soldiers (Moorsoldaten). The melody was composed by another prisoner, Rudi Goguel. After the transfer to the Lichtenburg concentration camp, Langhoff was released as part of the so-called Easter amnesty in 1934. Overall, Langhoff spent 13 months in prisons and concentration camps.

Three months later – in June of that year – he fled to Switzerland, just before the closure of the border. At the Schauspielhaus in Zürich, he found shelter and work as a director and actor. In 1935, he published the autobiographical memoir Rubber truncheon. Being an account of thirteen months spent in a concentration camp. After it was translated into English by Lilo Linke into English it became one of the first internationally known eyewitness accounts of brutality in the Nazi concentration camps. Langhoff was a founding member of the Free-Germany Movement in Switzerland.

== As an actor ==
Langhoff played Eilif in the first production of Bertolt Brecht's Mother Courage and Her Children, which opened at the Schauspielhaus Zürich on 19 April 1941. He also performed in the first production of Brecht's Life of Galileo, which also opened at the Schauspielhaus Zürich, on 9 September 1943.

He played Ernst Mehlin in Konrad Wolf's film Genesung (1956), von Geir in Nikola Korabov's Tyutyun (1962), and Professor Holt in Joachim Kunert's Die Abenteuer des Werner Holt (1965); he also appeared in Kurt Maetzig and Günter Reisch's Das Lied der Matrosen (1958). On television, he appeared in Hans-Joachim Kasprzik's mini-series Wolf Among Wolves (1965).

== As a director ==
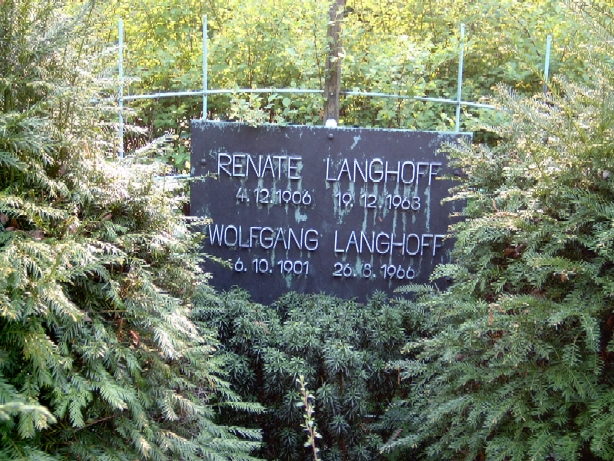
Grave of Renate and Wolfgang Langhoff in the cemetery of the congregations of Dorotheenstadt und Friedrichswerder in Berlin

It is on the strength of his productions of classical texts at the Deutsches Theater in Berlin, a theatre which he led from 1946 to 1963, that Langhoff's fame as a director rests. His notable productions there include: Goethe's Faust (1949 and 1954, productions in which he also played Mephisto) and Egmont (1951), Schiller's Don Carlos (1952), Shakespeare's King Lear (1957) and Lessing's Minna of Barnhelm (1960).

== Place of burial ==
Langhoff and his wife are buried in the 'Zentralfriedhof', made famous by Wolf Biermann's song 'Der Hugenottenfriedhof'. Biermann's song refers to Langhoff, as well as to Hanns Eisler, who arranged the music of 'Peat Bog Soldiers' (Moorsoldaten)', and is also buried there.

== See also ==
- The German-language Wikipedia Article on Wolfgang Langhoff
