= Dimitrovgradtsy =

Dimitrovgradtsy Димитровградци
- Directed by: Nikola Korabov; Ducho Mundrov
- Written by: Buryan Enchev
- Starring: Georgi Kaloyanchev; Maria Rusalieva; Ivan Dimov; Boris Chirakov
- Cinematography: Vulo Radev
- Music by: Stefan Remenkov
- Release date: 30 April 1956
- Running time: 109 minutes
- Country: Bulgaria
- Language: Bulgarian

Dimitrovgradtsy (Bulgarian: Димитровгрдци, English: People of Dimitrovgrad) is a Bulgarian drama film from 1956 directed by Nikola Korabov and Ducho Mundrov. It is based on a screenplay by Buryan Enchev, with cinematography by Vulo Radev. The music was composed by Stefan Remenkov. Georgi Kaloyanchev, Maria Rusalieva, Ivan Dimov, and Boris Chirakov appear in the lead roles.

== Plot ==
The film describes in socialist realism style the construction of the city of Dimitrovgrad few years after the end of World War II. It shows the enthusiasm of the young people sent there in brigades by the state, the so-called brigadiers, who worked for free to create a "city of dreams" for young people, where everything would be wonderful.

== Cast ==
- Georgi Kaloyanchev - Shteryo Barabata
- Maria Rusalieva - Nevena
- Ivan Dimov - Enev
- Boris Chirakov - Sobelev
- Inna Makarova - Lyudmila
- Nikola Dadov - Bogdan
- Sofia Karakasheva - Penka
- Veli Chaushev - Nuri
- Petko Karlukovski - Shopa
- Vladimir Trendafilov - Danailov
- Yordan Spasov - Dochev
- Ivan Tonev - Misho
- Dinko Dinev - Zhelyasko
- Elena Hranova - Baba Nona
- Georgi Asenov - Dyado Nedyo
- Ivan Bratanov - Savata
- Hristo Dinev - Bay Rayko
- Kosta Tsonev
- Rangel Valchanov
- Lyubomir Kabakchiev
- Dimitar Bochev
- Angel Gerov
- Ani Damyanova
- Kuncho Boshnakov
