= Dimitar Dimov =

Bulgarian author, vet, and dramatist (1909–1966)

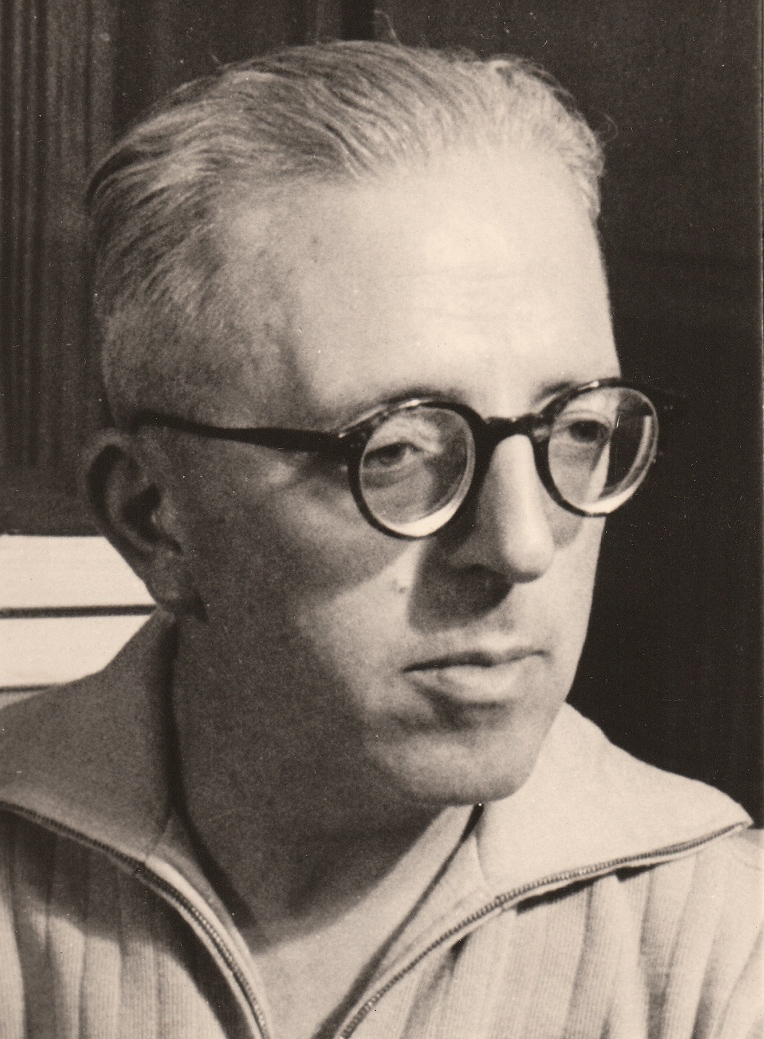
- Born: Димитър Тодоров Димов; 25 June 1909; Lovech, Bulgaria
- Died: 1 April 1966 (aged 56); Bucharest, Romania
- Occupations: Dramatist, novelist, and veterinary surgeon

Dimitar Todorov Dimov (Bulgarian: Димитър Тодоров Димов, 25 June 1909 – 1 April 1966) was a Bulgarian dramatist, novelist and veterinary surgeon.

== Biography ==
Born in Lovech, Dimov is best known for his best-selling novel Tobacco (Bulgarian: Тютюн, translit. Tyutyun, 1951) which was made into the 1962 film Tobacco directed by Nikola Korabov.

Other novels authored by Dimov are Lieutenant Benz (1938), a story of fatal love between flawed characters during World War I; and Damned Souls (1945), a tragic tale of a dissolute young Englishwoman's passionate obsession with a fanatical and reactionary Jesuit set in Spain during the civil war. His plays included Holiday in Arko Iris and Women with a Past.

Dimov died in Bucharest on 1 April 1966, at the age of 56. There is a bust of Dimov in the Borisova gradina park behind the Vasil Levski National Stadium in Sofia. His daughter Theodora Dimova is also a writer. In addition, a number of elementary schools across Bulgaria are named in his honor (particularly in his hometown of Lovech and in Plovdiv).

== Bibliography ==
- Димитър Веселинов. Френската лексика в романа "Тютюн" [The French words in the novel Tobacco], София, Сиела, 2009, 304 с.
