= Larisa Zhukovskaya =

Russian actress (1937–2026)

Larisa Aleksandrovna Zhukovskaya (Russian: Лариса Александровна Жуковская; 13 June 1937 – 1 June 2026) was a Russian actress.

== Life and career ==
Zhukovskaya was born in Moscow on 13 June 1937. In 1956, she made her film debut, playing a cameo role in They Were the First. Later she starred in such films as "War and Peace" (1967) by Sergei Bondarchuk, "Anna Karenina" (1967) by Alexander Zarkhi, and "Black Monk" (1988) by Ivan Dykhovichny.

Zhukovskaya died on 1 June 2026, at the age of 88.

== Awards ==
- Honored Artist of the Russian Federation (October 24, 2003)
- Medal "In Commemoration of the 850th Anniversary of Moscow"
