= Vula (name) =

Vula is both a given name and a surname. It may refer to:

- Josateki Vula, Fijian politician
- Lala Meredith-Vula (born 1966), Kosovan artist and photographer
- Ledri Vula (born 1986), Kosovar-Albanian rapper
- Samuela Vula (born 1984), Fijian footballer
- Vula Malinga (born 1980), American singer
- Vula, a 1965 Bulgarian film
