= Ivan Marinov =

Ivan Marinov may refer to:

- Ivan Marinov (politician) (1896–1979), Bulgarian general and politician
- Ivan Marinov (composer) (1928–2003), Bulgarian composer
- Ivan Marinov (canoeist) (born 1968), Bulgarian sprint canoer
