= The Undefeated (2000 film) =

- Directed by: Oles Yanchuk
- Written by: Vasyl Portiak
- Produced by: Oles Yanchuk
- Cinematography: Oleksiy Zolotarov; Vitaliy Zymovets
- Music by: Volodymyr Hronsky
- Distributed by: Dovzhenko Film Studios
- Release date: 2000
- Running time: 104 minutes
- Country: Ukraine
- Languages: Ukrainian; Russian; Polish; German
- Budget: $1 million

The Undefeated (Ukrainian: «Нескорений», romanized: Neskorenyi) is a 2000 Ukrainian film by Oles Yanchuk, a producer and director previously praised by The New York Times and Time magazine for his 1991 film Famine-33.

== Plot ==
In 1950, long after World War II has ended, a fight continues behind the newly drawn Iron Curtain: as the Ukrainians keep fighting Soviet forces, General Roman Shukhevych (Hryhoriy Hladiy) is forced by brutal circumstances to lead a guerrilla war as part of the Ukrainian Insurgent Army (UPA).

The film explores Shukhevych, both as a military leader and a family man. In the end, Shukhevych was unable to defeat the Soviet forces and was killed in a targeted assassination by the MGB, but the UPA re-enforce Ukrainian nationalism as an underground force until the end of the Cold War.

== Cast ==
- Hryhoriy Hladiy as Roman Shukhevych
- Victoria Malektorovych as Halyna Dydyk
- Serhiy Romaniuk as Soloviov
- Viktor Stepanov as NKVD major
- Svitlana Vatamaniuk as Natalka Shukhevych
- Dmytro Myrhorodskyi as Yosyp Shukhevych
- Volodymyr Horianskyi as agent Pashkevych
- Yaroslav Muka as Stepan Bandera

== Production notes ==
The Undefeated was filmed at the "Studio Oles-film" with the monetary assistance from the Ukrainian Congress Committee of America (UCCA), with the National Cinema Studio of feature films named after O. Dovzhenko. The film's chief advisor was Ukrainian American specialist Askold Lozynsky. It was filmed on location in the Carpathian Mountains of Ukraine, and such remarkable cities of Ukraine as Odesa, Kyiv and Lviv,
