= Music for December =

1995 film

- Directed by: Ivan Dykhovichny
- Written by: Ivan Dykhovichny; Marina Sheptunova
- Produced by: Leonid Lebedev
- Starring: Gregory Hlady; Yelena Safonova
- Cinematography: Sergei Kozlov
- Edited by: Eleonora Belova
- Music by: Anton Batagov
- Release date: 1995
- Running time: 95 minutes
- Country: Russia
- Language: Russian

Music for December (Russian: Музыка для декабря, romanized: Muzyka dlya dekabrya) is a 1995 Russian drama film directed by Ivan Dykhovichny. The film was screened in the Un Certain Regard section at the 1995 Cannes Film Festival.

== Plot ==
Alexander Larin, a successful Leningrad artist, an emigrant of the last wave, returns to his homeland and meets his former lover Anna and her daughter Masha. What will end the journey to a country that no longer exists? And love, and the former itself, too. The past overtakes the hero as retribution.

== Cast ==
- Gregory Hlady as Larin
- Viktor Bychkov as cyclist
- Nikolai Chindyajkin as Samoilov
- Dmitry Dykhovichny as Dima
- Sergei Kalvarsky as advertising director
- Andrei Kostyukevich as Rastorguev
- Irina Osnovina as pedicurist
- Irina Piganova as Lera
- Margarita Romanova as Secretary
- Yelena Safonova as Anna Bersenyova
- Vadim Stepantsov as Plotnikov
- Natalya Zhukova as Masha

== Awards ==
- Nika Award for the best sound engineer's work (Ekaterina Popova)
