= Wrathful Journey =

1971 film

- Directed by: Nikola Korabov
- Written by: Diko Fuchedzhiev
- Produced by: Nikola Vulchev
- Starring: Iossif Surchadzhiev
- Cinematography: Boris Yanakiev
- Release date: 23 April 1971
- Running time: 90 minutes
- Country: Bulgaria
- Language: Bulgarian

Wrathful Journey (Bulgarian: Гневно пътуване, translit. Gnevno patuvane) is a 1971 Bulgarian drama film directed by Nikola Korabov. It was entered into the 7th Moscow International Film Festival.

== Cast ==
- Iossif Surchadzhiev as Chavdar
- Dorotea Toncheva as Vanya
- Severina Teneva as Yuliya
- Nikola Todev as Bay Stoyan
- Georgi Kaloyanchev as Bashtata na Chavdar
