= They Were the First =

- Movie poster
- Directed by: Yuri Egorov
- Written by: Yuri Egorov; Jozef Printsev
- Produced by: Yakov Svetozarov
- Starring: Georgi Yumatov; Mark Bernes; Mikhail Ulyanov
- Cinematography: Igor Shatrov
- Music by: Mark Fradkin
- Production company: Gorky Film Studio
- Release date: 1956
- Running time: 95 min
- Country: USSR
- Language: Russian

They Were the First (Russian: Они были первыми) is a Soviet full-length black-and-white film, staged at the Moscow Gorky Film Studio in 1956, directed by Yuri Yegorov. At the heart of the script is the play by Józef Printsev.

The film premiered in the USSR on May 15, 1956.

== Plot ==
1918. Troubled in Petrograd. The enemy ring is already tightening around the revolutionary city. Work shelves are leaving for the front. The struggle against the enemies of Soviet power goes not only on the outskirts of the city, but also in the rear. Komsomol organizations are being created at this harsh and difficult time for the revolution at the behest of the Bolshevik Party on the workers' outskirts. The first young workers join the Young Communist League – Stepan Barabash, Sanya Chizhik, Glasha, Kuzma. After some hesitation and meditation, the peasant boy Fyodor, who came from a remote village to work in St. Petersburg, and the gymnast Zhenya Gorovsky become peasants. In days of intense battles, young patriots, together with detachments of the Workers' Guards, go to defend Petrograd.

About the first Komsomol members Petrograd, who rose to defend the Soviet power.

== Cast ==
- Georgi Yumatov as Stepan Barabash
- Liliana Alyoshnikova as Glasha
- Mark Bernes as Rodionov
- Mikhail Ulyanov as Alexey Kolyvanov
- Mikhail Derzhavin as Yevgeny Gorovskoy, student and poet
- Nina Krachkovskaya as Yelena
- Mikhail Kondratiev as Lenin
- Larisa Zhukovskaya

== Literature ==
Neya Zorkaya, Soviet historical and revolutionary film, Moscow: Academy of Sciences of the USSR, 1962, 217 pages.
