= Moscow, My Love =

- Directed by: Aleksandr Mitta; Kenji Yoshida
- Written by: Tasiuki Kasikura; Aleksandr Mitta; Edvard Radzinsky
- Starring: Komaki Kurihara; Oleg Vidov; Makoto Satō; Ivan Dykhovichny; Valentin Gaft; Oleg Yefremov
- Cinematography: Vladimir Nakhabtsev
- Edited by: N. Veselovskaya
- Music by: Boris Chaikovsky
- Production companies: Mosfilm; Toho
- Release date: 1974
- Running time: 95 minutes
- Countries: Soviet Union, Japan
- Languages: Russian, Japanese

Moscow, My Love (Russian: Москва, любовь моя, romanized: Moskva, lyubov moya, Japanese: モスクワわが愛) is a 1974 Soviet-Japanese romantic drama directed by Aleksandr Mitta and Kenji Yoshida. The film tells the story of Yuriko, a girl from Hiroshima who comes to Moscow to study ballet. The film's title is a reference to the Alain Resnais film Hiroshima My Love.

== Plot ==
Yuriko Ono is a young promising dancer in Japan. Yuriko's opportunity to become a professional dancer comes when she is invited to Moscow to study ballet at the Bolshoi Theatre.

Yuriko finds happiness when she falls in love with a Muscovite sculptor Volodya and wins the competition of the Bolshoi Theatre graduates. But her happiness is short; a diagnosis of blood cancer abruptly impedes her path of dedication to art and seems to plunge her life into a storm ...

The unfortunate girl was born in the capital city of Hiroshima - which suffered one of the two atomic bombs from the US Army in 1945. After days of struggling with the terrible legacy of the war Yuriko dies in Volodya's arms in a hospital in the city of Moscow.

== Cast ==
- Komaki Kurihara - Yuriko
- Oleg Vidov - Volodya
- Valentin Gaft - choreographer
- Tatyana Golikova - Tanya
- Elena Dobronravova - Elena Nikolaevna
- Ivan Dykhovichny - tutor
- Oleg Yefremov - doctor
- Alex Varlamov - ballet teacher
- Makoto Satō - Yuriko's uncle
- Lyudmila Zaytseva - nurse
- Lyubov Sokolova - costume designer
- Aleksandr Abdulov - groom
