= Vladimir Trapeznikov =

- Born: Vladimir Konstantinovich Trapeznikov; 13 September 1956 (age 69); Chișinău, Moldavian SSR, USSR
- Occupations: Art director Production design
- Awards: Golden Eagle Award (2023); Nika Award (2024)
- Website: vladimirtrapeznikov.name

Vladimir Konstantinovich Trapeznikov (Russian: Влади́мир Константи́нович Трапе́зников; born 13 September 1956) is an artistic director and production designer, and a member of the Union of Cinematographers of the Russian Federation since 1988.

== Biography ==
- 1976—1981 Faculty of Drawing and Graphics (Kazakhstan Pedagogical Institute, Almaty)
- 1987—1993 Faculty of Art, All Russian State University for Cinematography (VGIK), Moscow.
- Student of Soviet artist, graphic artist and writer, Pavel Yakovlevich Zaltsman

== Selected filmography ==
- 2023 Land of Legends (Director: A. Megerdichev)
- 2021 Nebesnaya komanda (Director: V. Alenikov)
- 2008 Roses for Elsa (Director: Ye. Konchalovsky)
- 2008 Moscow, I Love You! A series of short, multi-genre films about Moscow:
  - Etude in Bright Colors (Director: V. Chiginsky),
  - Queen (Director: A. Surikova),
  - Well, What Should I Tell You Muscovites... (Director: Ye. Konchalovsky),
  - Concert Suite (Director: G. Nathanson),
  - Real Life (Director: I. Okhlobystin),
  - Melody of a Summer Night (Director: Ye. Kalinina),
  - Elevation (Director: M. Ibragimbyekov),
  - Shabolovka (Director: I. Kvirikadzye),
  - High-rise (Director: N. Jorjadze).
- 2007 Father, 8 episodes (Director V. K. Mischenko)
- 2006 One Love in a Million (Director: V. Schegolkov)
- 2005 Vanechka (Director: Ye. Nikolaeva)
- 2004 Mirror Wars: First Reflection (Director: V. Chiginsky)
- 2004 The Narrow Bridge, 4 episodes (Director: O. Basilov)
- 2004 Countdown (Director: Ye. Lavrentyev)
- 2003 The Golden Age (Director: I. Khotinyenko)
- 2003 Dasha Vasileva. Amateur Private Investigator, 15 episodes (Director: A. Matyeshko)
- 2003 Money, 30 episodes (Director: I. Dykhovichny)
- 2002 On the Corner of Patriarshye 3, 12 episodes (Director: V. Derbenev)
- 2002 The Impact of the Lotus (Director: A. Porokhovschikov)
- 2001 The Kopeck (Director: I. Dykhovichny)
- 2001 Sabina Shpilryan (Director: R. Fayentso)
- 2000 Temporary Insanity Affect (Director F. Kubiyda)
- 2000 On the Corner of Patriarshye 2, 12 episodes (Director: V. Derbenev)
- 1999 Work Russian Style (Director R. Kopelli)
- 1997 New Year’s Story (Director: A. Baranov)
- 1996 Shanghai (Director: A. Baranov)
- 1995 Dead Body (Directors: B. Mirza and V. Filimonov)
- 1994 A Weak Heart (Director: Ye. Shinarbaev)
- 1993 The Place on the Gray Cocked Hat (Director: E. Shinarbaev)
- 1992 The Inventor of Pharaoh, 2 episodes (Director: G. Zemel)
- 1991 Celebrities on Tudor Street (Director: M. Zimin)
- 1991 Kozi Korpesh I Bayan Sulu, 2 episodes (Director: A. Ashimov)
- 1990 Kaisar (Director: V. Pusurmanov)
- 1989 Galoshes (Director: M. Vasilyev)
- 1988 A Wolf-Cub Among the People (Director: T. Temyonov)
- 1987 Strange World of Desires and Hopes (Director: B. Mustafin)
- 1986 The Tale of the Beautiful Aysulu, 2 episodes (Directors: V. Chugunov and R. Tazhibaev)
- 1985 Non-professionals (Director: S. Bodrov)
- 1984 My Sister Lucy (Director: Ye. Shinarbaev)

== Author’s work ==
- 2008 The Beast from the Bottomless Pit (Director: A. Ivankin)
- 2007 Hidden Costs or Visitor to a Fairytale (Director: G. Constantinopolsky)
- 2007 A New Moscow (Producer: I. R. Bondaryenko)
- 2005 Quarantine
- 2004 Garpastum (Director A. Hamroyev)
- 2004 Evilenko (Director: David Grieco)
- 2000 Martian Chronicles (Director: Anton Molok)
- 1993 The Man Departing (Director: Ye. Shinarbaev)
- 1989 Vengeance (Director: Ye. Shinarbaev)
- 1988 Oderzhimiye Tyenyu (Director: S. Babayan)
