= Moral Code X =

Russian rock band

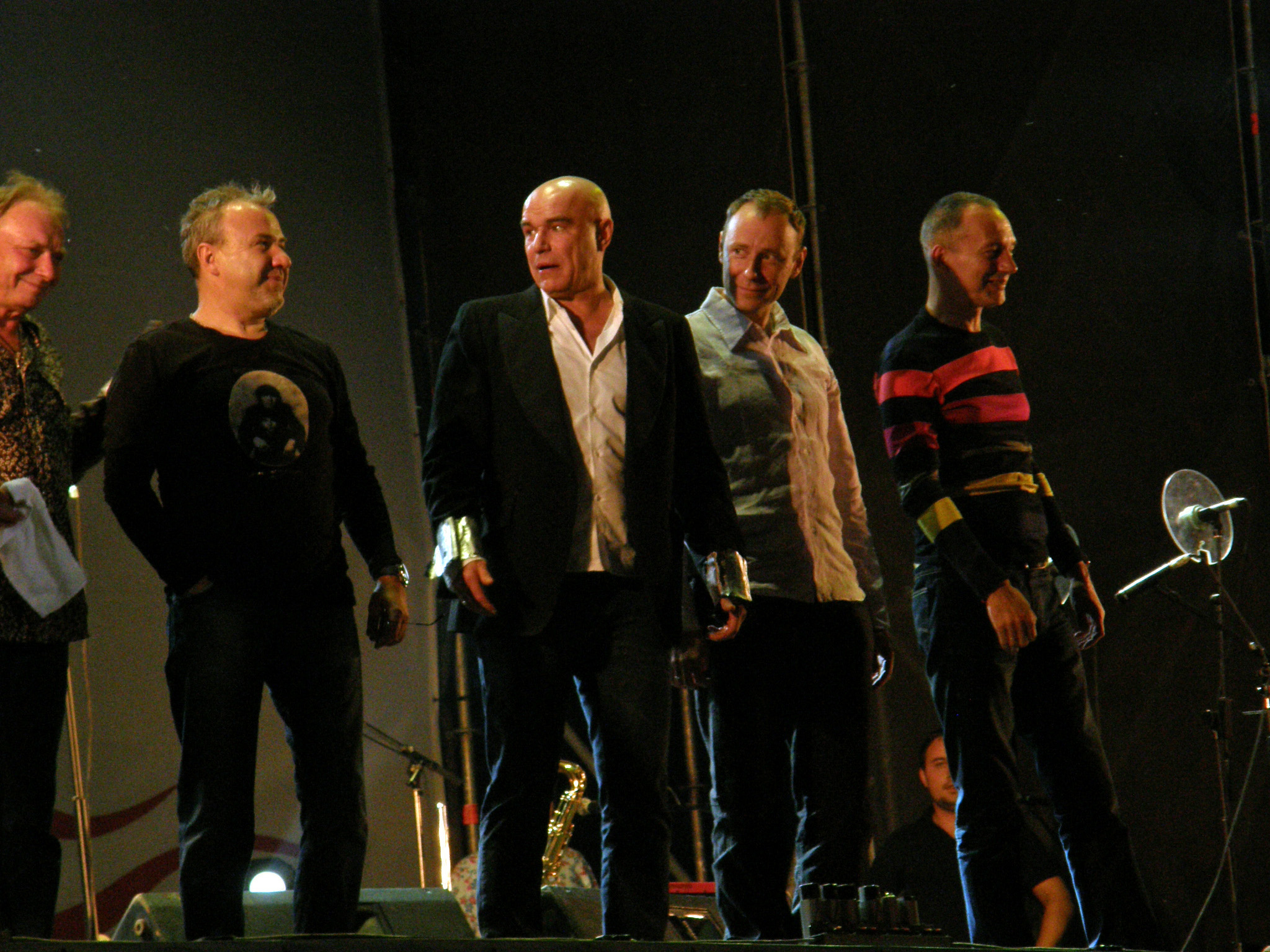
- Donetsk 2010

Background information
- Origin: Moscow, Russia
- Genres: Rock, Rock and Roll, Big beat, Jazz, Blues
- Years active: 1989 — present
- Label: Mazay Communications
- Members: Sergey Mazayev; Nikolay Devlet-Kildeev; Alexandr Solich; Konstantin Smirnov; Yury Kistenev
- Website: http://www.moralcodex.ru

"Moral Code X" or "Moralny Kodex" (Russian: Моральный кодекс) is a Russian rock band founded in 1989 by Moscow producer and poet Pavel Zhagun and saxophonist Sergey Mazayev to play reactive big beat.

The debut album by Moralny Kodex was called Sotryasenie Mozga (Russian for brain concussion).

In the early 1990s, Moralny Kodex was recognized as the most promising and popular rock band in Russia but their second album Gibkij Stan (here Slender Body) wasn't very successful. Some in-band disagreements appeared after this release, due to frontman Sergey Mazayev's problems with alcohol. The band temporarily left the Russian mainstream scene.

Their third album was entitled I Choose You. In 1997 Moralny Kodex started recording their fourth album, Good News, which was finally released in 2000. In 2004 drummer Yuriy Kistenev left the band, and Mazaev invited new drummer Zack Sullivan from New York City. After a while the band made some new recordings.

In February 2014, released sixth studio album, Winter.

== Members ==
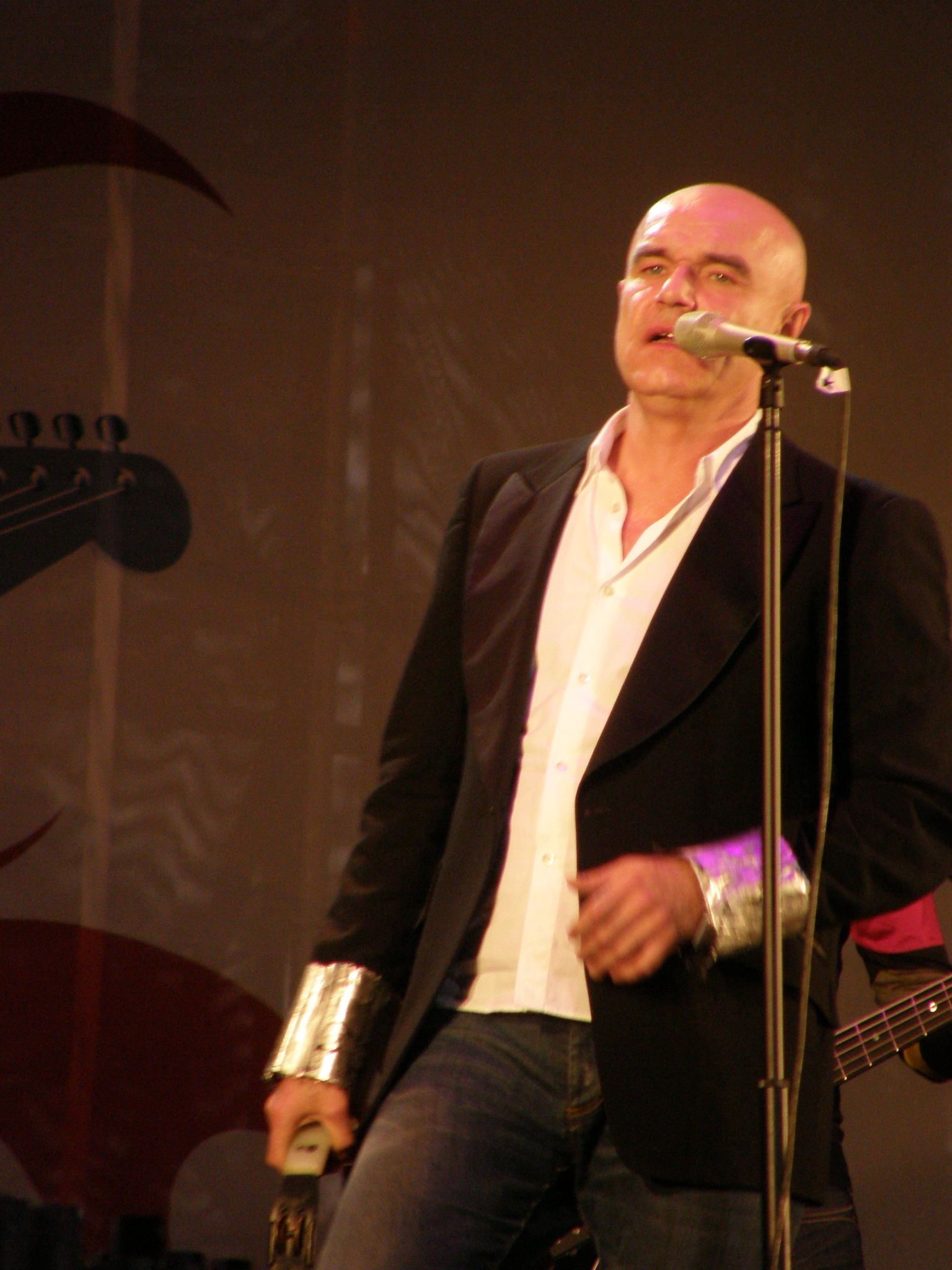
Sergey Mazayev

- Sergey Mazayev — Vocals, Sax, Flute
- Nikolay Devlet-Kildeyev — Guitar
- Alexander Solich — Bass guitar
- Konstantin Smirnov — Keyboard, percussion
- Yuriy Kistenyov — Drums
- Pavel Zhagun — Poet, musician and media artist, creative art producer

== See also ==
- Rock music in Russia
