= The Peach Thief =

Крадецът на праскови
- English: The Peach Thief
- Directed by: Vulo Radev
- Written by: Emilian Stanev (story); Vulo Radev
- Produced by: Atanas Papadopulos
- Starring: Nevena Kokanova; Rade Marković; Mikhail Mikhajlov
- Cinematography: Todor Stoyanov
- Edited by: Ana Manolova-Pipeva
- Music by: Simeon Pironkov
- Production company: Boyana Film
- Release date: 1964
- Running time: 105 minutes
- Language: Bulgarian

The Peach Thief (Bulgarian: Крадецът на праскови) is a 1964 Bulgarian film, directed by Vulo Radev and based on a story by Emilian Stanev. Set towards the end of World War I, it tells the story of a whirlwind love affair between a Serbian prisoner of war, Ivo Obrenovich (played by Rade Markovic), and a colonel's wife, Elisaveta, played by Nevena Kokanova.

The title refers to an incident in the plot in which Ivo Obrenovich is caught by Elisaveta in her private garden stealing peaches. Her lonely life with her cold husband leads to her reliance on their frequent meetings in the peach garden. They form a mutual deep and affectionate love for one another.

The Peach Thief won three awards at the Bulgarian Film Festival 1964: Best Actor, Best Actress, and the Special Jury Award.
