= Ivan Dimov =

Bulgarian actor

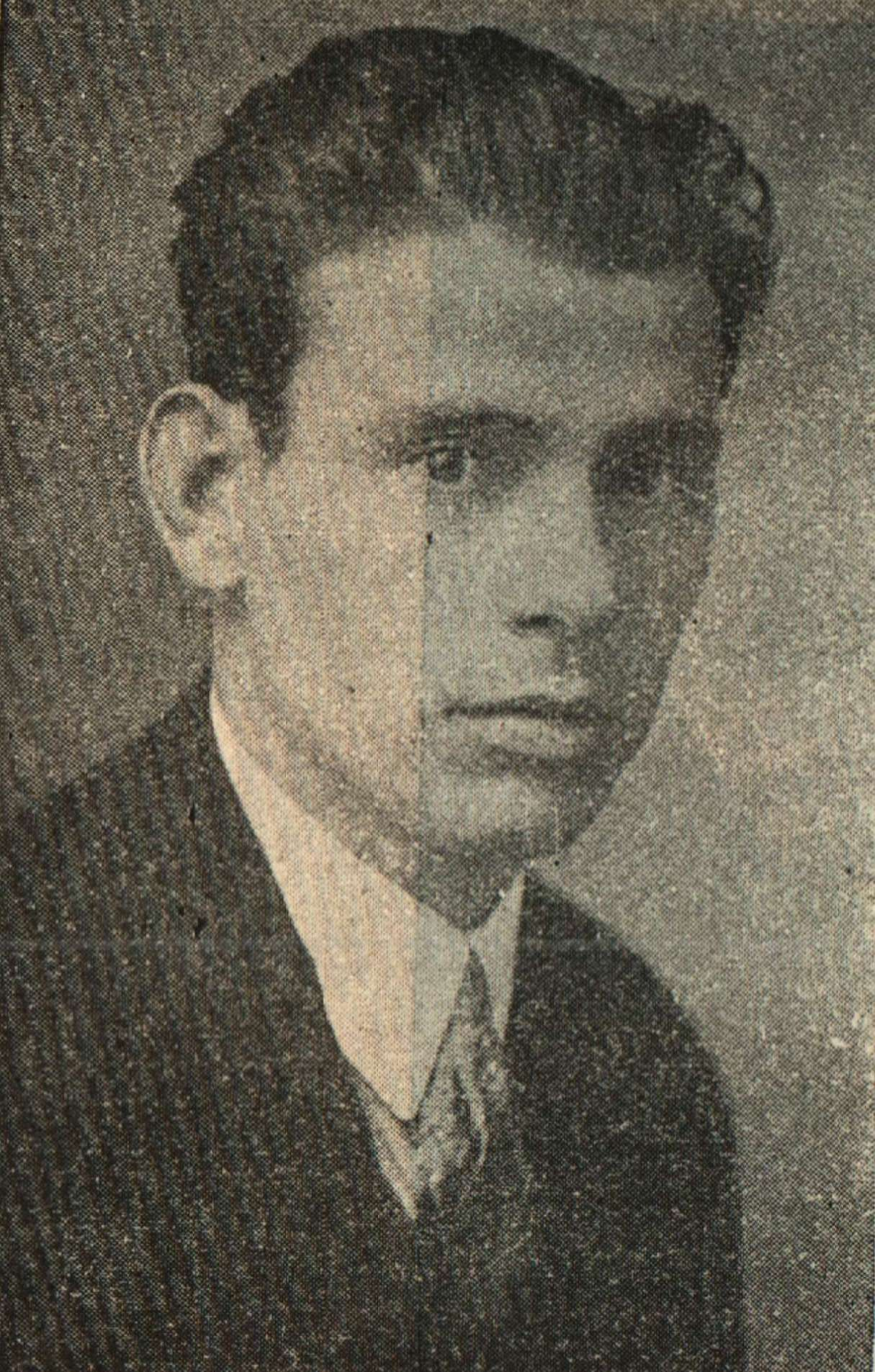
- Born: 14 January 1897; Chirpan, Principality of Bulgaria
- Died: 1 April 1965 (aged 68); Sofia, People's Republic of Bulgaria

Ivan Dimov (Bulgarian: Иван Димов) was a Bulgarian actor.

== Biography ==
He studied acting at the Ivan Vazov National Theatre and spent the next 39 years playing on the stage. Meanwhile he managed to star in some of the most prominent Bulgarian films of the 1950s and 1960s like "Kalin Orelat" and "Tyutyun". For his contribution to the cinema Dimov was awarded the title People's artist (very popular in the People's Republic of Bulgaria).

== Full filmography ==
- Tyutyun (1962) as Barutchiev
- Tzarska milost (1962) as Doychin Radionov
- Komandirat na otryada (1959) as Bay Nikola
- Malkata (1959) as Yatakat
- Siromashka radost (1958) as Dyado Mateyko
- Geratzite (1958) as Margalaka
- Dimitrovgradtsy (1956) as Enev
- Pod igoto (1952) as Marin vaglishtarya
- Kalin orela' (1950) as Kalin
- Izpitanie (1942) as Alexander Kamenov, eng.
- Strahil voyvoda (1938) as Strahil voyvoda
- Bezkrustni grobove (1931) as Kocho
