= Jan Englert =

Polish actor (born 1943)

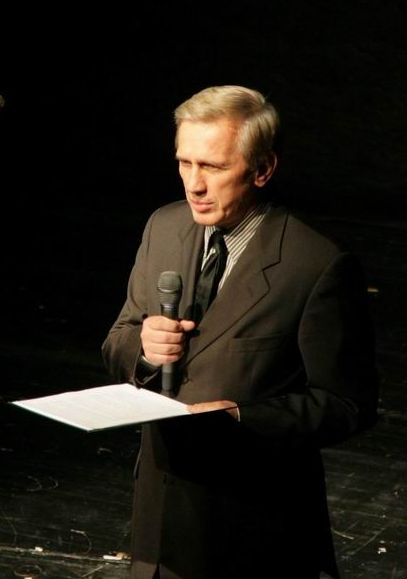
- Englert in 2008
- Born: 11 May 1943 (age 83); Warsaw, Poland
- Education: Aleksander Zelwerowicz National Academy of Dramatic Art
- Occupations: Actor, director
- Years active: 1957–present
- Children: 4, including Helena
- Relatives: Maciej Englert (brother); Michał Englert (nephew)

Jan Aleksander Englert (born 11 May 1943) is a Polish film actor. He has appeared in more than 60 films since 1957. Since 2003 he has served as Artistic Director of the National Theatre in Warsaw.

== Biography ==
Jan was born on 11 May 1943. In 1957 at the age of 14 he made his film debut in Andrzej Wajda's Kanał.

In 1964, Englert graduated from the Aleksander Zelwerowicz National Academy of Dramatic Art in Warsaw and started working in the Polish Theatre, where at first he mostly played supporting roles. A breakthrough came in 1968 with the international success of Notes, produced by the Television Theatre, where he was noticed by Kazimierz Kutz and offered work in film. To his frustration, Englert found himself being type-cast into roles of friendly, straightforward, honorable and unambiguous lovers.

I would like to stop being treated as a confectionary actor, that is, unable to experience deeper screen experiences.

In 1969 he left the Polish Theatre to begin working at the Contemporary Theatre in Warsaw, but returned back to his original stage in 1981, where he stayed till 1994. In 1997 he started acting for the National Theatre in Warsaw and became its artistic director in 2003, a function which he has been fulfilling to this day.

Despite his success and popularity in film, Englert has said that he most values his work in the theatre and it is there that he experiences the biggest satisfaction.

His work has been recognised internationally. In May 2001, he was awarded the title of honorary professor of the Russian Academy of Theater Arts in Moscow. He was awarded the Order of Polonia Restituta in 2001 by president Aleksander Kwaśniewski.

Englert has a brother, Maciej Englert, who is also an actor.

== Selected filmography ==
- Kanał (1956) as "Zefir"
- Liberation (1969–71)
- Salt of the Black Earth (1970)
- Kolumbowie (1970)
- Pearl in the Crown (1972) as Erwin Maliniok
- Trzeba zabić tę miłość (1972) as Andrzej's boss, the owner of a car repair shop
- Osadeni Dushi (1975)
- Nights and Days (Noce i Dnie) (1975)
- Magnat (1987)
- Katyń (2007)
- Tatarak (2009)
- Tajemnica Westerplatte (2013)
- The Defence (2021–22)
