= The Kopeck =

- Russian: Копейка
- Directed by: Ivan Dykhovichny
- Written by: Ivan Dykhovichny; Vladimir Sorokin
- Produced by: Ivan Dykhovichny; Erik Waisberg; Vitaliy Yuzhilin
- Starring: Sergey Mazaev; Andrey Krasko; Yury Tsurilo; Roman Madyanov; Aleksandra Kulikova
- Cinematography: Aleksandr Ilkhovskiy; Vadim Yusov
- Edited by: Elena Afanaseva
- Music by: Anton Batagov
- Production company: Volya
- Release date: 2002
- Running time: 100 min.
- Country: Russia
- Language: Russian

The Kopeck (Russian: Копейка, romanized: Kopeyka) is a 2002 Russian comedy film directed by Ivan Dykhovichny. The production design was by Vladimir Trapeznikov. The name refers to the soviet car VAZ-2101, popularly nicknamed a kopeck.

== Plot ==
The film shows the adventures of the legendary VAZ-2101, resuscitated by the hands of the master Bubuka.

== Cast ==
- Sergey Mazaev as Bubuka
- Andrey Krasko as narrator
- Yury Tsurilo as Viktor
- Roman Madyanov as former KGB; militiaman; visa and registration for Foreigners Office employee
- Aleksandra Kulikova as Anton's wife
- Oleg Kovalov as Anton Borisovich
- Sergey Shnurov as man in window
- Olga Dihovichnaya as Tanya
- Alyona Babenko as Sonya
- Igor Artashonov as Vladimir Vysotsky
- Fyodor Dobronravov as driver
- Sergei Frolov as painter
- Ivan Dykhovichny as assistant director
