= Osadeni Dushi =

Osadeni Dushi (Doomed Souls)
- (Bulgarian: Осъдени Души)
- Directed by: Vulo Radev
- Written by: Vulo Radev
- Based on: Osadeni Dushi (novel) by Dimitar Dimov
- Produced by: Konstantin Dzhidrov
- Starring: Jan Englert; Rousy Chanev; Mariana Dimitrova; Edit Szalay
- Cinematography: Hristo Totev
- Music by: Mitko Shterev
- Production companies: Boyana Film; Bulgarofilm
- Distributed by: Bulgarofilm
- Release date: 17 October 1975 (Bulgaria)
- Running time: 141 minutes
- Country: Bulgaria
- Language: Bulgarian

Osadeni Dushi (Bulgarian: Осъдени Души) is a 1975 Bulgarian epic film, written and directed by Vulo Radev based on the 1945 novel by Dimitar Dimov, and starring Jan Englert, Rousy Chanev, Mariana Dimitrova, and Edit Szalay.

== Plot outline ==
The film tells the tragic story of British noblewoman Fanny Horn (Edit Szalay) and Jesuit priest Heredia (Jan Englert) against the backdrop of the Spanish Civil War. A rich young aristocrat who has spent her preceding years in a decadent lifestyle, Fanny falls in love with Heredia; however, although the priest feels the same, he places his fanatical devotion to his faith above their attraction. Fanny follows Heredia to a typhus outbreak at a camp near Pena Ronda and volunteers to work as a nurse under his command and to finance the camp. Nevertheless, the conditions at the camp are appalling and deteriorate sharply as the civil war begins. Fanny gradually becomes increasingly desperate with the fanatic and inhumane behaviour of Heredia, who turns out to be deeply involved in the plotting of the anti-republican side in the civil war. As Heredia continues to reject her love, and as she eventually witnesses his fanaticism take several human victims, Fanny shoots him. Her psychological breakdown has led her to begin taking morphine, which will eventually lead to her own demise.

== Cast ==
- Jan Englert as Father Heredia
  - Kosta Conew as Father Heredia (voice)
- Rousy Chanev as Jacques Muriet
- Mariana Dimitrova as Carmen
- Edit Szalay as Fanny Horn
- Valcho Kamarashev as Father Olivares
- Silvija Rangelova as Clara

== Reception ==
Speaking toward Minister Vezhdi Rashidov's visit to Poland to present actor Jan Englert with a lifetime achievement award, Fakti called the film a "Bulgarian classic", and Dnevnik marked the film as among the top 10 most beloved films of Bulgaria.
