= Stefan Remenkov =

Bulgarian composer and pianist

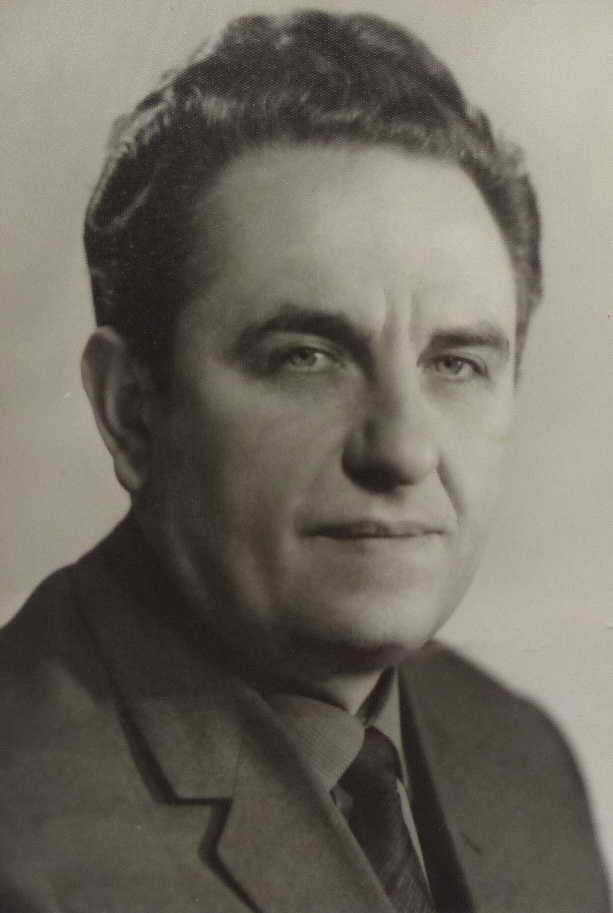
- Born: 30 April 1923; Silistra, Bulgaria
- Died: 30 October 1988 (aged 65); Sofia, Bulgaria
- Occupation: composer

Stefan Nikolov Remenkov (Bulgarian: Стефан Николов Ременков) (born 30 April 1923, Silistra - 30 October 1988, Sofia) was a Bulgarian composer and pianist.

== Biography ==
Remenkov comes from a family of teachers. His father Nikolay Remenkov taught history and philosophy, and was a headteacher. His mother Angelina was a chemistry teacher. He received piano lessons from an early age and began composing already in school. He completed his high school education in Constanta, Romania where the family lived at the time. During World War II he served as a soldier on the front with the Bulgarian army. After the war he studied music graduating in 1950 from the Bulgarian State Conservatoire majoring in composition under Prof. Pancho Vladigerov and Prof. Veselin Stoyanov; and piano under Prof. Dimitar Nenov. He taught Musical Forms at the Bulgarian State Conservatoire from 1950 - 1955 as assistant-lecturer to Prof. Veselin Stoyanov, then specialised for a year at the Moscow Conservatory under Aram Khachaturian.

After that he lived and worked as a composer in Sofia, writing more than 86 compositions. Some of these received awards, for instance "Prelude and Dance" (1957). Most were published and many of Bulgaria's top musicians, orchestras, and choirs performed them. Balkanton released over the years three long playing vinyl records (LP's) with music by Stefan Remenkov, the last one in 1980. Further recordings are in the archives of the Bulgarian National Radio, which broadcast them. Among his works are one opera, one operetta, a musical, a ballet; many instrumental works - symphonies, concertos for piano and orchestra, for violoncello and orchestra, for violin and orchestra, sonatas for piano, for violin and piano, for flute, oboe, and piano, suites, preludes, divertimento, rhapsody, piano quintet, string quintet, string quartets, trios, film music; as well as solo, choral, and children's songs.

Characteristic for his music is the melodic brightness "rhythmic inventiveness, emotional immediacy and clear formal procedure. His orchestral works are notable for their dynamic vitality and complex combinations of folk rhythms.

== Works ==
Stage Works

- Opera "Ганем" (Ganem), 1967
- Operetta "Грешките са наши" (Greshkite sa nashi - The errors are ours), libretto by Radoy Ralin, 1966
- Musical "Принцът и просякът" (The Prince and the Pauper), libretto based on Mark Twain's novel "The Prince and the Pauper", 1973
- Ballet "Непокорените" (Nepokorenite - The Untamed), 1971

Instrumental works

- Symphony in the Classical Style (Симфония в класически стил), 1960
- Sinfonietta, 1960
- Children's Symphony (Детска симфония), 1961
- Symphony No.3, 1965
- Phaeton symphonic poem (Симфонична поема Фаетон), 1966
- Symphony No.4, 1968
- Symphony No.5, 1971
- Suites (1952, 1970)
- Suite "From Distant Lands" (От далечни страни), 1958
- Suite for flute and piano, 1976
- Divertimento, 1962
- Concerto for piano and orchestra No.1, 1953
- Concerto for piano No.2, 1969
- Concertino for piano and chamber orchestra, 1980
- Concerto for violoncello and orchestra, 1964
- Concerto for violin and orchestra, 1980
- Concert-rhapsody for piano and orchestra, 1981
- Rhapsody for clarinet, 1975
- Ten preludes for piano, 1956
- Prelude and Dance, 1957
- Three pieces for piano - Panorama (Панорама), Butterfly (Пеперуда), Hay Wagon (Колата със сено), 1966
- Piano quintet
- String quintet
- String quartets (1959, 1960)
- Trio for flute, oboe, and bassoon, op. 54
- Sonata for violin and piano, 1955
- Sonatina for violin and piano, 1972
- Sonatina for piano No. 4, 1984
- Sonata for flute, oboe and piano, 1979
- Watercolour and Humoresque for violin (or viola) and piano, 1950
- Six sonatas for piano (1944, 1948, 1949, 1958, 1959–62, 1980)

Film music

- Димитровградци (Dimitrovgradtsy) (1956)
- Н.Й. Вапцаров (N. J. Vapzarov) (1954), documentary
- Ропотамо (Ropotamo) (1958), documentary

Vocal

- Hyperion chorus and orchestra 1966, poem Mihai Eminescu
- Solo songs
- Choral songs
- Children's songs (1968)

== Awards ==
- Orden Cyril and Methodij - Орден Кирил и Методий, 2-ра степен

== Bibliography ==
- Bakers Biographical Dictionary of Musicians, Eight Edition, Schirmer Books, New York 1992
- British Library. Remenkov (Stefan) Соната за цигулка и пиано. Sonate pour violon et piano. (Score and part.) 2 pt. Държавно издателство "Наука и изкуство": София, 1955. g.896.b.(4)
- British Library's Sound Collection. Prelude And Dance/Remenkov Sofia State Philharmonic Orchestra/Vladi Simeonov (recording)
- Frank, Paul; Altman, Wilhelm. Kurzgefasstes Tonkünstler Lexikon, Bd. 2, Ausgabe 15, Wilhelmshaven 1978
- Hollfelder, Peter. Das Grosse Handbuch der Klaviermusik, Hamburg 1996
- The New Grove Dictionary of Music and Musicians, Second Edition, Vol. 21, Macmillan Publishers, London 2001
- Radev, Valcho (Радев, Вълчо). Бележити Силистренци (Belezhiti Silistrenzi - Notable People from Silistra), Silistra 2006
- Schönewolf, Karl. Konzertbuch, Bd. 2, Leipzig 1967
