= The Black Monk (film) =

- Russian: Чёрный монах
- Directed by: Ivan Dykhovichny
- Written by: Ivan Dykhovichny; Sergey Solovev
- Based on: The Black Monk by Anton Chekhov
- Starring: Stanislav Lyubshin; Tatyana Drubich; Pyotr Fomenko; Lyubov Selyutina; Viktor Shternberg; Yelena Boguslavskaya
- Cinematography: Vadim Yusov
- Edited by: Eleonora Praksina
- Music by: Temur Bakuradze
- Release date: 1988
- Running time: 88 minute
- Countries: Soviet Union; West Germany
- Language: Russian

The Black Monk (Russian: Чёрный монах) is a 1988 Soviet musical drama film directed by Ivan Dykhovichny.

The film tells about a philosopher named Andrei Kovrin, who goes to a village where he meets Tatyana, who will immediately fall in love.

== Plot ==
The story follows Andrey Kovrin, a young doctor of philosophy, who visits the estate of his former guardian, Yegor Pesotsky, in hopes of restoring his mental health. Yegor is a well-known amateur horticulturist, having devoted his life and resources to cultivating a vast orchard of valuable cherry, pear, and apple trees. At the estate, Kovrin reconnects with Yegor’s daughter, Tanya, who has grown into a beautiful young woman. Captivated by her, he proposes, and Yegor, eager to see Kovrin as the estate's future heir, supports their engagement. During a walk in the garden, Kovrin encounters a mysterious vision: a black monk materializing from a whirlwind, a figure he vaguely recalls from an old legend. The monk reappears, telling Kovrin he is uniquely gifted and destined for greatness. Flattered and energized, Kovrin becomes happier, delighting the Pesotsky family. However, Tanya grows alarmed when she catches him speaking to an empty chair and insists he seek treatment for his mental health, fearing his hallucinations indicate illness. Kovrin, now under strict care that includes routine milk consumption and daily walks, resents the loss of his visionary experiences and greatness. He blames Tanya and her father for stripping him of his inspiration and, feeling stifled, ultimately leaves Tanya and the estate.

Years later, Kovrin, now gravely ill with tuberculosis, lives in Crimea with an older woman. One day, he receives a bitter letter from Tanya, who informs him of her father's death, the sale of their estate, and the decline of the cherished orchard, blaming him for its ruin and wishing him an early death. Disturbed by her words, Kovrin’s physical and mental state deteriorates, leading to a severe coughing fit and a hallucinatory episode. From the horizon over the Black Sea, the vision of the black monk returns to him one last time. As Kovrin succumbs in agony, he envisions himself back at the Pesotsky estate, chased by a massive whirlwind. Collapsing at the doorstep of the manor, he dies as the whirlwind overtakes him and the estate, symbolically consuming his life and ambitions.

== Cast ==
- Stanislav Lyubshin as Korvin
- Tatyana Drubich as Tania
- Pyotr Fomenko as Tania's Father
- Lyubov Selyutina
- Viktor Shternberg
- Larisa Zhukovskaya
- Yelena Boguslavskaya as Yelena Boguslavskaya
