= Hilarius Gilges =

German actor, dancer and activist

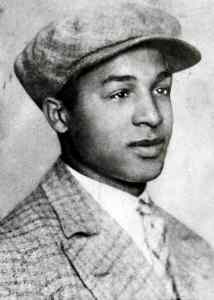
- Hilarius Gilges
- Born: 28 April 1909; Germany
- Died: 20 June 1933 (aged 24); Germany
- Other name: Hilarius "Lari" Gilges
- Occupations: Actor, dancer, political activist
- Political party: German Communist Youth
- Spouse: Katharina Hubertine Laatsch
- Children: 2
- Parent(s): Maria Stüttgen; Franz Peter Gilges

Hilarius Gilges (28 April 1909 – 20 June 1933) was a black German actor, dancer and communist political activist. He was murdered at the age of 24 by the Nazi party.

== Life ==
Hilarius Gilges was one of the few black Germans born in the country before the First World War. His mother Maria Stüttgen was a white German textile worker in Düsseldorf; the origin of his biological father is not known for certain. Maria married Franz Peter Gilges in 1915, giving the boy the family name Gilges.

Gilges grew up in the working class milieu of Düsseldorf and joined German Communist Youth in about 1925 or 1926. He became an amateur actor with the communist agitprop theatre group "Nordwest ran" directed by Wolfgang Langhoff. His radical politics led in 1931 to his arrest and sentencing to one year in prison. After his release in 1932 he continued as an active communist agitator.

Gilges married Katharina Hubertine Laatsch (born Vogels) and fathered two children.

== Death ==
In early 1933, after the Nazis seized power, he attempted to go into hiding, but his visibility due to his skin color made this difficult. In June 1933, he was arrested in his apartment in the city's Altstadt district (Old Town) district of Düsseldorf. His body was found under a bridge the next day. The perpetrators are believed to have been six members of the Gestapo and SS, but even after the end of Nazi rule, were not tried in court.

His widow and two children survived the Nazi period, probably because they were helped by neighbors in the Altstadt. In 1949 they were given a lump sum compensation of 12,000 Deutschmark as restitution.

== Commemorations ==
On 23 December 2003 the city of Düsseldorf named a plaza after Hilarius Gilges, in the vicinity of the Düsseldorf Academy of Arts. In 1988 a plaque had been already placed at the approximate site of the murder. The plaque was commissioned by the Düsseldorf city museum and designed by the local artist Hannelore Köhler. It shows a relief profile of Gilges.
