= Sergey Mazayev =

Russian singer (born 1959)

Sergey Mazayev Серге́й Владимирович Маза́ев
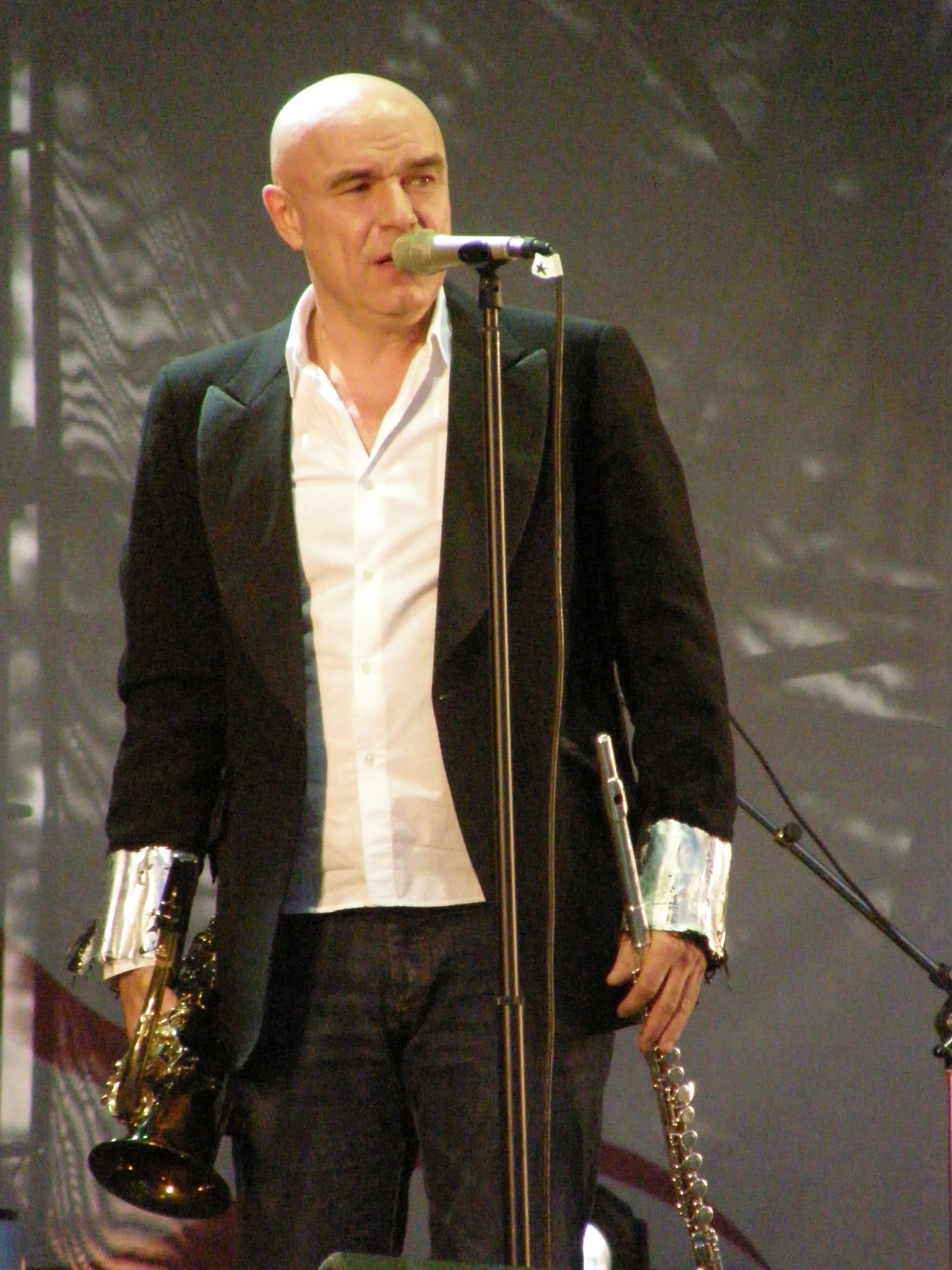

Background information
- Born: December 7, 1959 (age 66); Moscow, Russia
- Genres: rock, jazz, classical
- Occupations: Instrumentalist, singer, songwriter
- Instruments: Saxophone, clarinet, guitar
- Years active: 1977-present
- Label: Mazay Communications
- Website: http://mazay.tv

Sergey Vladimirovich Mazayev (Russian: Серге́й Влади́мирович Маза́ев), also known as Mazay, is a musician, singer, songwriter and lead singer of the rock band "Moral Codex". He heads his own production, sound and publishing label Mazay Communications. Honored Artist of Russia. (2010).

== Early life ==
Sergey Mazayev was born in 1959 Moscow, USSR (now Russian Federation).

== Projects ==
- Moral Codex (Moralny Kodex) (Russian: Моральный кодекс means Moral code) is a legendary Russian rock band founded in 1989. The band gained popularity and has successfully retained a large following, with a musical blend for various preferences. Incorporating big beat, rock’n’roll and jazz/blues along with the lead singer's characteristic and recognisable voice this band is a unique phenomenon on the rock stage. The band performs on a regular basis in the CIS countries. It also participates in festivals i.e. Live 8 in 2005 and has collaborated with big international names such as record producer Chris Kimsey, who worked with Rolling Stones.Sergey Mazayev's Queentet is a quintet established in 2013. The title of the group is a play on words; Queentet / quintet referencing to the majority of its members being women.
- Sergey Mazayev's dance orchestra founded in 2011 is a unique gathering of different musicians on one stage.

== Career ==
=== Music ===
- 2005 — founded production centre Mazay Communications.

==== Bands ====
- 1977 — 1989 Zdrastvuy, pesnia (ru)
- 1979 — 1990 Autograph formed in Moscow and was one of the most popular rock performers on the Soviet stage
- 1989–present Moral Codex

==== Collaboration ====
1996 — Duet with Natalya Vetlitskaya

1999 — Started performing with the jazz musician Igor Butman

2004 — Participated in the making of Singing Together's (Russian: «Поющие вместе») music video, which went viral due to its humorous nature

2013 — featured in the "GQ" song along with famous Russian rappers Timati and L'One.

2015 — Another humorous video that Mazaev took part of was a project in the frameworks of "Evening Urgant" show (similar to the Jimmy Fallon show in America). The song "Эх, лук-лучок" was created after an interview with Oleg Oparin. The show's creative team were so impressed by the interviewee's ability to improvise, that they decided to turn his simple tune into a hit. Among those who took part in the creation of this are Timati, Ilya Lagutenko (frontman of Mummiy Troll), Vera Brezhnev, Valeriya and Philipp Kirkorov. The project resembles the 1985 "We are the World" song produced by over 20 famous musicians.

=== Acting ===
- 1979 — The Meeting Place Cannot Be Changed as saxophonist in the restaurant
- 2002 — The Kopeck as Bubuka
- 2008 — Dark Planet as Voldyr
- 2008 — Radio Day as cameo

=== Awards ===
- 2010 — Awarded with the title of Merited Artist of Russian Federation by then president Dmitry Medvedev
- 2010 — Received Musician of the Year award at the yearly ceremony of "GQ people"

== Personal life ==
Mazayev is married to Senior Lifestyle Editor of GQ Russia (Conde Nast) Galina Mazaeva. Mazayev has a son from his first marriage; Ilya Mazaev, who after graduating from Moscow State University (Russian: МГУ) studied in the prestigious Berklee College of Music, Boston, USA.
