= Gregory Hlady =

Ukrainian actor (born 1954)

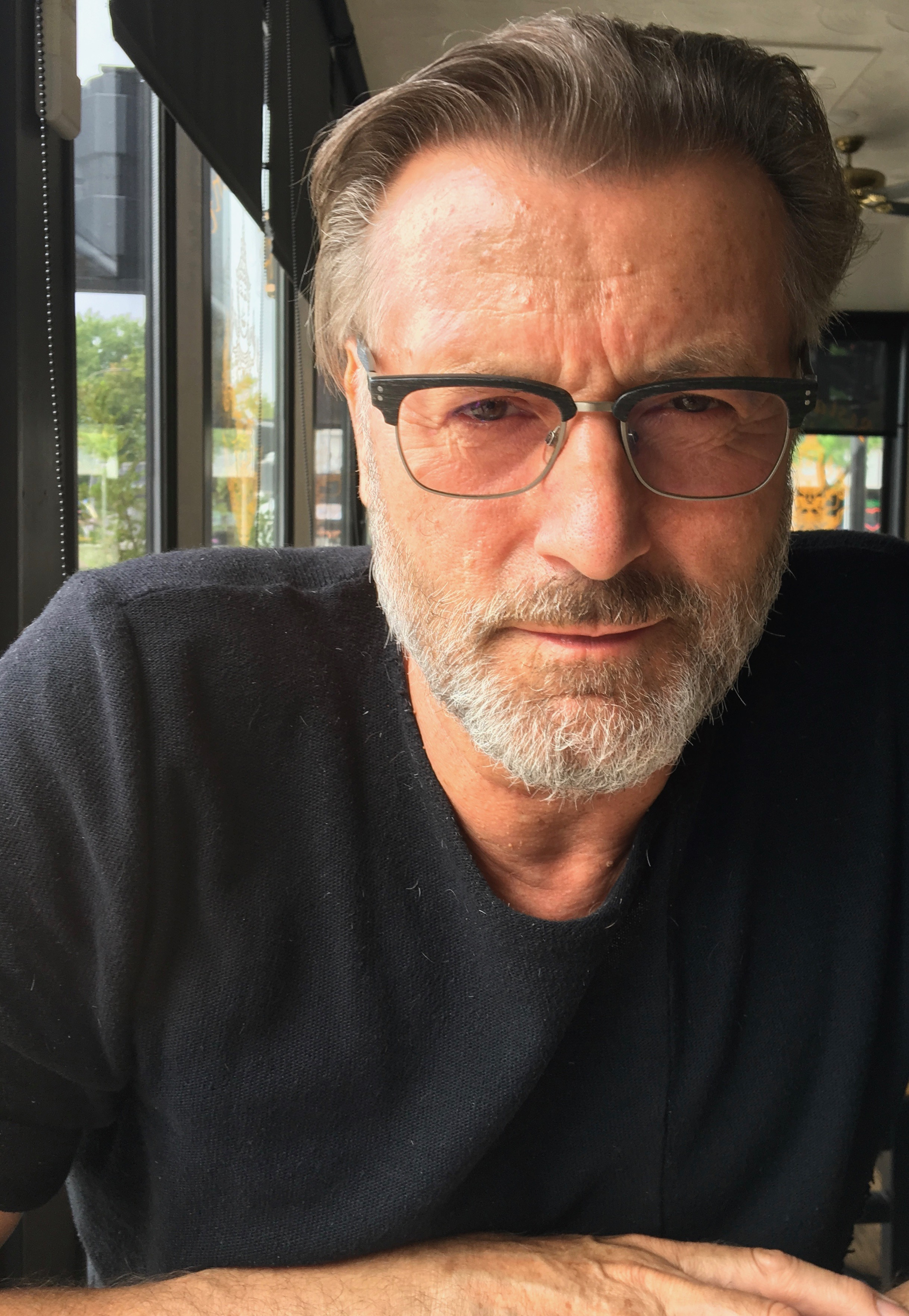
- Gregory Hlady in 2019
- Born: Hryhoriy Stepanovych Hladiy; 4 December 1954 (age 71); Khorostkiv, Ternopil Oblast, Ukrainian SSR (now Ukraine)
- Occupation: Actor
- Years active: 1973-present

Gregory Stepanovych Hlady (Ukrainian: Григорій Степанович Гладій, Hryhoriy Stepanovych Hladiy; born 4 December 1954) is a Ukrainian and Canadian actor. He has appeared in more than 80 films and television shows since 1973. He starred in Music for December, which was screened in the Un Certain Regard section at the 1995 Cannes Film Festival.

== Selected filmography ==
- 1974 Only Old Men Are Going to Battle as Fighter Pilot of 1st Squadron
- 1980 Dudaryky
- 1981 Such Late, Such Warm Autumn
- 1982 Preodoleniye as Valentin Sergeyevich Osintsev
- 1984 Stolen Happiness
- 1985 Vozvrashchenie Batterflyay
- 1986 Obvinyaetsya svadba
- 1986 Mama, rodnaya, lyubimaya...
- 1987 Otstupnik as Miller
- 1988 Voydite, strazhdushchie! - Avenir Avdeyev
- 1988 Fantasticheskaya istoriya
- 1989 Sirano de Berzherak as Cyrano De Bergerac
- 1990 Leningrad. Noyabr
- 1990 Vospominanie bez daty
- 1991 Paths of Death and Angels as Schrevek István
- 1991 Anna Karamazoff
- 1991 Slomannyy svet as Mark Yevdokimov
- 1991 Prosti nas, machekha-Rossiya as Guban
- 1992 La bête de foire as Borkine
- 1994 Desire in Motion (Mouvements du désir) as Homme Au Téléphone
- 1994 Mrs. Parker and the Vicious Circle as Russian Director
- 1994 Agnes Dei
- 1995 Music for December as Aleksandr Larin
- 1995 Bullet to Beijing (TV Movie) as Police Captain
- 1996 The Ideal Man (L'homme idéal) as Lazslo
- 1997 Hysteria as Syd Meeker
- 1997 Strip Search as Helmut Wicks
- 1997 Les mille merveilles de l'univers as Un Officer D'élite
- 1997 The Assignment as KGB Aide
- 1998 The Red Violin as Coat Attendant (Montréal)
- 1998 Quelque chose d'organique
- 1998 Musketeers Forever as Lead Russian Mobster
- 1999 Running Home as Truba
- 1999 Laura Cadieux II (Laura Cadieux... la suite)
- 2000 The Undefeated as Roman Shukhevych
- 2002 The Sum of All Fears as Milinov
- 2002 The Marsh (Le Marais) as Alexandre
- 2003 Far Side of the Moon as L'interpréte
- 2003 Spinning Boris as Andrei Lugov
- 2004 Jack Paradise: Montreal by Night (Jack Paradise : Les nuits de Montréal) as Gino O'Connor
- 2004 Manners of Dying as The Cook
- 2005 The Iris Effect as Ivan
- 2006 Deliver Me (Délivrez-moi) as Milan
- 2006 The Ugly Swans as Viktor Banev
- 2006 The Point as Grey Car Guy
- 2006 Pourquoi le dire?
- 2008 Akme
- 2010 The Bait (L'Appât) as Poutine
- 2011 Noch na zakate leta as Pater Lukas
- 2013 Diego Star as Kopeïkine
- 2013 Jappeloup as Speaker Concours
- 2014 X-Men: Days of Future Past as General Petrov
- 2015 The Forbidden Room as Jarvis / Dr. Deane / A Husband
- 2015 Occupation (TV Series)
- 2015 The Name You Carry
- 2016 Seances
- 2017 Zradnyk as Osavul
- 2017 Gear as Roman

== Theater ==
=== Actor ===
- Eugène Onéguine Jonas Vaitkus / Dramatic russian art theatre of Lituanie / (2013 to 2014)
- Un tramway nommé Désir Alexandre Marine / Th. du Rideau Vert / (2009)
- Mozart et Salieri Anatoly Vassiliev / Tour : Amsterdam and Avignon / (2006)
- L'Autre Paula De Vasconcellos / Pigeons International / Usine C / Tour: Portugal, Germany, Vancouver / (2001 to 2002)

=== Director ===
- The Gambler Fyodor Dostoyevsky/ Prospero, Montréal, Canada (2016)
- The Dance of Death August Strindberg/ Prospero Montréal, Canada (2012)
- The Wedding Bertolt Brecht / Prospero Montréal, Canada (2011)
- Heart of a Dog Mikhail Bulgakov / Prospero Montréal, Canada (2008)
- Le Roi se Meurt Eugène Ionesco / La Veillée Montréal, Canada (1994)
- Le Retour Harold Pinter / La Veillée Montréal, Canada (1992)
- Amerika Franz Kafka / La Veillée Montréal, Canada (1992)
