= Hitar Petar =

Character in Bulgarian folklore

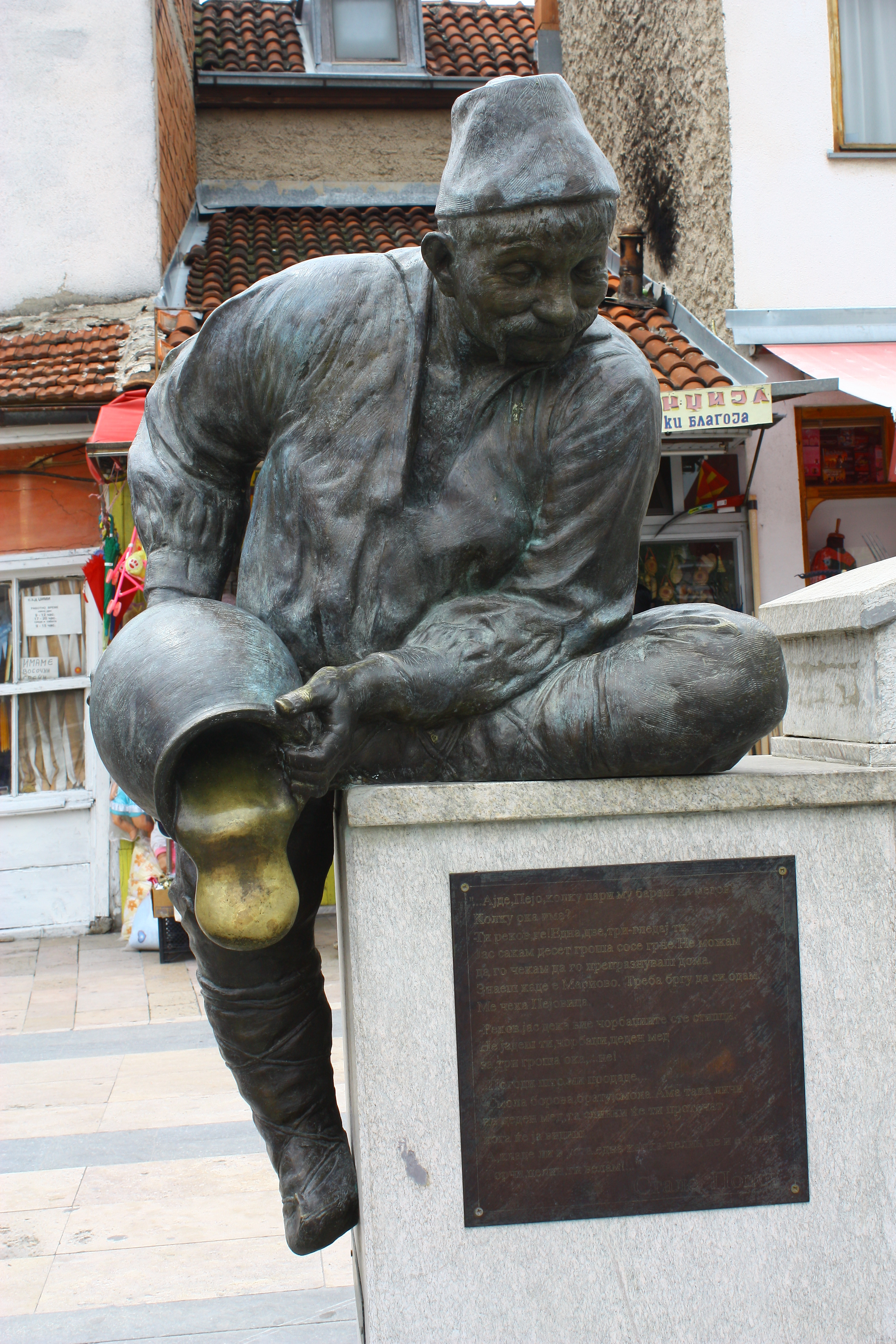
Monument of Itar Pejo that was set up in the old town of Prilep, North Macedonia, in 2008.

Monument of Hitar Petar in front of the House of Humour and Satire in Gabrovo, Bulgaria, which was built in 1981.

Hitar Petar or Itar Pejo (Itar Petar) (Bulgarian: Хитър Петър, Macedonian: Итар Пејо or Итар Петар), meaning "Sly Peter" or "Clever Peter", is a character of Bulgarian and Macedonian folklore.

He is a poor village farmhand, but possesses remarkable slyness, wit and wiles. He is often presented as the "typical Bulgarian" in Bulgaria and the "typical Macedonian" in North Macedonia. He is the perpetual antagonist of either the rich nobles, clerics and money lenders or the "typical Ottoman" — Nasreddin, whom he always manages to outwit. He is therefore regarded as a strictly positive figure and a hero of the common folk. According to different folklore narratives, he is either from Rousse, Haskovo, Gabrovo or Prilep, but in general, he is simply an imagined folk hero.

As a character, Hitar Petar first appeared in the 16th–17th century, when most of the Balkans were still under Ottoman rule. Tales on his deeds are present in the folklore of many regions. His name appeared for the first time in written records in the late 1850s. Petko Slaveikov wrote in 1858 about Hitar Petar. In 1862 Kuzman Shapkarev recorded from Metodi Kusev a long tale about Itar Petar. In 1869 Dobri Voynikov used his name as own nickname, and between 1870 and 1874 Dimitar Panichkov published the newspaper "Hitar Petar". Marko Cepenkov sent in 1870 to Petko Slaveykov a lot of proverbs about Itar Pejo. In 1873 Iliya Blaskov published in Ruse a small booklet with the anecdotes about Hitar Petar. Slaveykov, Vasil Cholakov and Dimitar Manchov also recorded folk tales about Hitar Peter at that time. Veselin Stoyanov's opera Clever Petar premiered in Sofia in 1958. He has been also featured in two comedy films, Nastradin Hodzha i Hitar Petar of 1939 and Hitar Petar of 1960.

In 1977, Macedonian Radio Television recorded a TV series, according to the script by Mile Nedelkovski. A collection of short stories titled "Itar Pejo" was published by the writer Stale Popov. In 1966, Slavko Janevski published the poetry collection "The Gospel of Itar Pejo".

Hitar Petar is similar to other characters of European and Oriental folklore, most notably Nasreddin of Islamic folklore, the German Till Eulenspiegel, the Flemish Thyl Ulenspiegel, the Hungarian Csalóka Péter and the Jewish Hershele Ostropoler.

In North Macedonia, it is thought that Itar Pejo is a native of the region of Mariovo, and a monument to the character was built in Prilep.

Hitar Petar Nunatak on Trinity Peninsula in Antarctica is named after the folklore character.
