= Yulia Petrovna Vrevskaya =

Russian nurse (1838–1878)

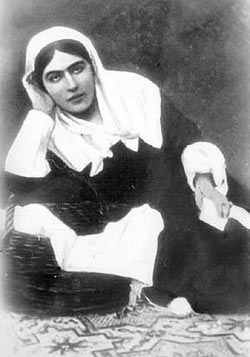
Yulia Petrovna Vrevskaya

Yulia Petrovna Vrevskaya (Russian: Юлия Петровна Вревская; née Varpakhovskaya (Russian: Варпаховская); 25 January 1838 – 24 January 1878) was a Russian nurse and baroness. She served as a wartime nurse during the 1877–1878 Russo-Turkish War, where she died of a typhus infection.

== Biography ==
Yulia Petrovna Varpakhovskaya was born in Lubny on 25 January 1838. Her father was a general in the Imperial Russian Army. She attended the Odessa Institute for Noble Maidens before moving with her family to Stavropol. She married general and baron I.A. Vrevsky in 1856, but her husband was killed by injuries sustained in battle in 1858. Vrevskaya and her family moved to Saint Petersburg later that year, where she was appointed maid of honour to Empress Maria Alexandrovna. Vrevsky often traveled during these years, and she came into contact with several notable figures. She was a friend of writer Ivan Turgenev, and he may have had romantic interest in her. She was also friends with poet Alexander Pushkin, who is said to have treated her as his own sister.

During the 1877–1878 Russo-Turkish War, Vrevskaya volunteered as a nurse with the Holy Trinity Community. She trained with the Red Cross for several months, and then she joined several nurses in Iași to treat the wounded in an evacuation barracks. She sold her aristocratic family's estate and used the funds to support wartime nursing, and she traveled to field hospitals throughout the war to treat soldiers in combat zones. While on the battlefield, Vrevskaya suffered from a typhus infection, falling ill on 5 January 1878. She died on 24 January 1878 near Byala, Ruse Province, Bulgaria, where she was buried.

After Vrevskaya's death, several authors dedicated writings to her memory, including Turgenev, Pushkin, and Victor Hugo. A statue was built in her honor in Byala. Vrevskaya was portrayed by Ludmila Savelyeva in the Bulgarian–Soviet film Yuliya Vrevska, directed by Nikola Korabov in 1978. The film did not receive widespread attention until it was reintroduced at the Moscow International Film Festival in 2013.
