= Bull (1965 film) =

1965 film

- Directed by: Nikola Korabov
- Written by: Nikola Korabov
- Produced by: Doncho Todorov
- Starring: Nadezhda Randzheva
- Cinematography: Konstantin Dzhidrov
- Release date: 30 August 1965
- Running time: 69 minutes
- Country: Bulgaria
- Language: Bulgarian

Bull (Bulgarian: Вула, translit. Vula) is a 1965 Bulgarian drama film written and directed by Nikola Korabov. It was entered into the 4th Moscow International Film Festival.

== Cast ==
- Nadezhda Randzheva as Nadezhda
- Ivan Manov as Osadeniyat na smart
- Lyuben Boyadzhiev
- Dimitar Hadzhiyanev
- Ivan Bratanov
- Mikhail Mikhajlov as Sveshtenikat
- Boris Arabow
- Stoycho Mazgalov
- Zharko Pavlovich as Nemski ofitzer
