= Emiliyan Stanev =

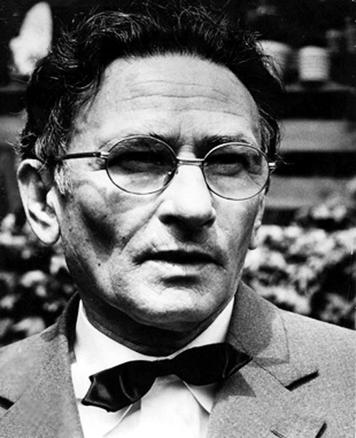

Emiliyan Stanev (Bulgarian: Емилиян Станев) was the pseudonym of Nikola Stoyanov Stanev (Никола Стоянов Станев, 28 February 1907 – 15 March 1979), a 20th-century Bulgarian prose writer.

Stanev was born in Veliko Tarnovo in 1907 and spent his childhood in Tarnovo and Elena, where he long lived with his family. From an early age, his father would take him to his hunting outings in the open, which influenced Stanev's later work, where nature is often described. In 1928, he finished the Elena high school as a private student and moved to Sofia, where he studied painting under Tseno Todorov. In the 1930s, he enrolled in Finances and Credit in Free University of Political and Economic Sciences, (today University of National end World Economy in Sofia). In 1932–1944, he was an office worker of the Capital Municipality and in 1945 he was the director of the hunting reserve in the village of BukovetsStanev published his first works in 1931. He was active in a number of magazines and newspapers: he headed the fiction department of the

Literary Front newspaper and published in Fate, Testaments, Art and Critic, Goldhorn, Wreath, Bulgarian Speech, etc. Stanev wrote tales involving animals, social and philosophical prose, historical novels and novelettes. During his stay in Sofia he was an acquaintance of the city's leading intellectuals who had a strong influence on his later works. Stanev's first book was a collection of short stories named Tempting Glitters issued in 1938. His next book was the collection Alone from 1940, which set forth a series of works devoted to the relations between man and nature. The books to follow were Wolfish Nights (1943), Workdays and Holidays (1945), Wild Bird (1946), In a Silent Night (1948). One of his last and best-known works, The Peach Thief, was published in 1948 and filmed in 1964. After 1950, he worked for 14 years on his novel Ivan Kondarev describing the events surrounding the September Uprising of 1923. Stanev also authored many books for children and teenagers, such as Through Forests and Waters (1943), The Greedy Bear Cub (1944), Tale of a Forest (1948), When the Frost Melts (1950) and Chernishka (1950).

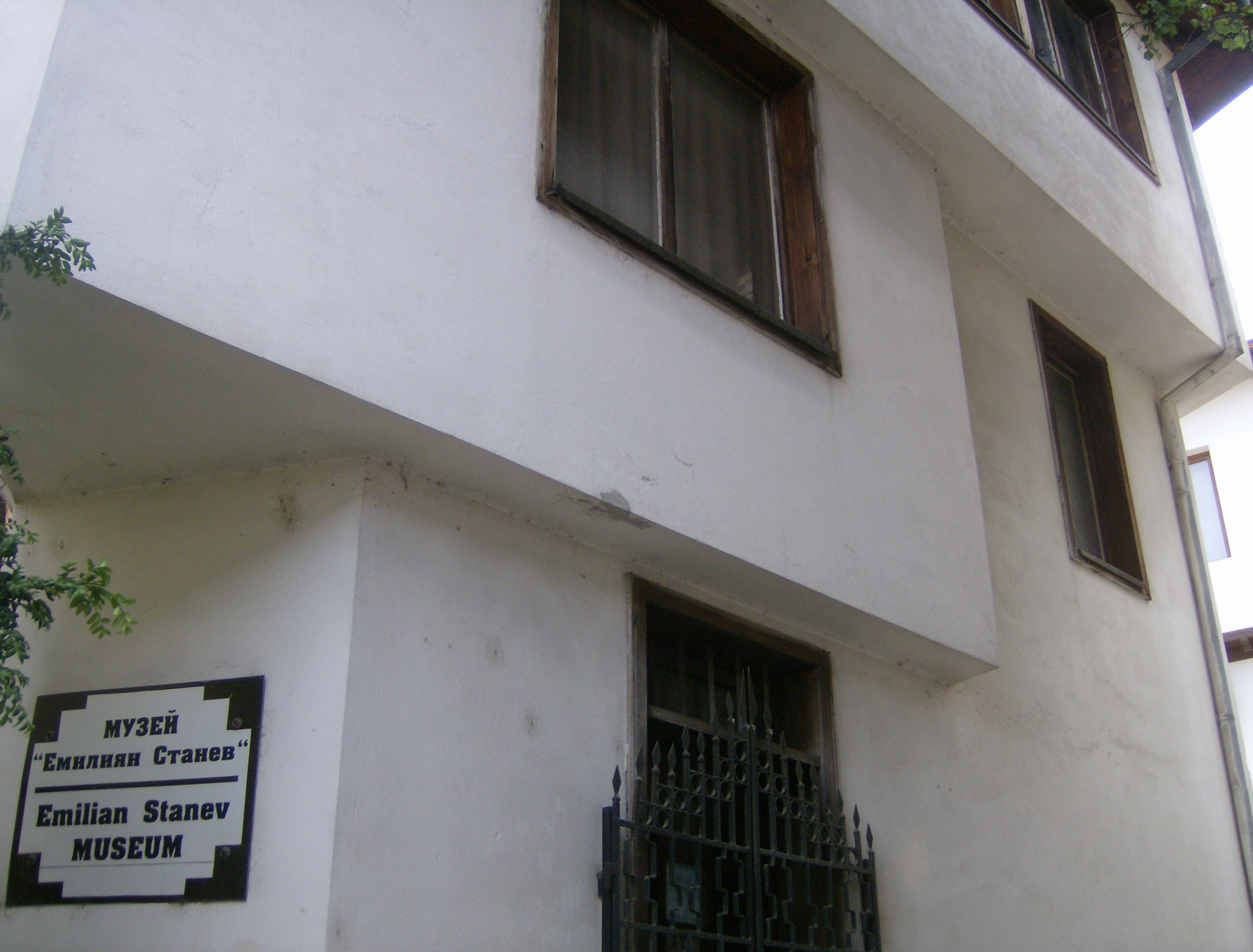
Emiliyan Stanev Museum

The later works of Emiliyan Stanev had more philosophical themes; in those works, he also employed his in-depth knowledge of the history of Bulgaria. The novels Legend of Sibin, the Prince of Preslav (1968), Tihik and Naziriy, Antichrist (1970), The Queen of Tarnovo (1974), etc., all date to this period. Stanev died in Sofia in 1979.
