= Vulo Radev =

- Въло Радев
- Born: 1 January 1923; Lesidren, Bulgaria
- Died: 28 March 2001 (aged 78); Sofia, Bulgaria
- Occupations: Cinematographer; film director; writer

Vulo Radev (Bulgarian: Въло Радев) (Lesidren, 1 January 1923 – Sofia, 28 March 2001) was a Bulgarian film director, writer, and cinematographer, who also did some script editing.

Within the context of Bulgarian cinema, his films Цар и генерал (Tsar and General) and The Peach Thief have been praised for their "montage within the frame".

== Filmography ==
=== Filmography (director) ===
- 9 November 1964: The Peach Thief ((in Bulgarian): Крадецът на праскови / Kradetzat na praskovi / Kradezat na praskowi)

A film adaptation of a novel about World War I by Emilian Stanev. A location shooting in Veliko Tarnovo. Central characters are "Lisa" (a wife of commanders in Tarnovo), and a prisoner "Ivo" with whom she starts a love relationship. The style of narrative is "epic".

- 17 January 1966: Tsar and General ((in Bulgarian): Цар и генерал / Tsar i general / Zar i General)

Explores the moral and psychological duel between the two main characters: the historical persons tsar Boris III and General Vladimir Stoyanov Zaimov. The latter receives the death penalty and gets shot for collaborating with the Soviet Union during World War II. The tsar is depicted tragically, as a man whose attitude is not suited for his time; yet he survives in the movie. Many scenes are not directly connected to the central event; side-events display the protagonists and their arguments.

- 4 September 1970: The Black Angels ((in Bulgarian): Черните ангели / Chernite angeli / Tschernite Angeli)

The title of the film refers to a group of 20-year old communists who received the task of executing dangerous Bulgarian fascists in 1942 and 1943. The youngsters use language and attitudes as if they were living in the current time [read: ± in 1970, the year when the movie was released]. The movie explores the difficulty for "normal" youngsters to kill, even if they understand the necessity and importance of their task. This culminates in some of their suicides.

- 17 October 1975: Doomed Souls ((in Bulgarian): Осъдени души / Osadeni dushi / Osadenie duschi)

A young, rich English woman meets a Spanish Jesuit during the Spanish Civil War in 1936. The film has been praised for capturing the societal dimension of the history.

- 22 June 1981: (Note: The date is specified as "1980" in a certain source.) Adaptation ((in Bulgarian): Адаптация / Adaptatziya / Adapzia)

About a group set up by a mental health professional, addressing issues of insanity.
