= Ivan Marinov (composer) =

Bulgarian composer and conductor

Ivan Marinov (Bulgarian: Иван Маринов) (17 October 1928 – 26 February 2003) was a Bulgarian composer and conductor. He was born in Sofia, Bulgaria. His work as a conductor has been recorded together with the Sofia Opera Orchestra, and the Radio Sofia Philharmonic.
