= Nikola Korabov =

Bulgarian film director

- Born: 7 December 1928; Ruse, Bulgaria
- Died: 10 November 2016 (aged 87)
- Occupations: Film director Screenwriter
- Years active: 1956 - 1999

Nikola Korabov (Bulgarian: Никола Корабов, 7 December 1928 – 10 November 2016) was a Bulgarian film director and screenwriter.

== Career ==
He directed thirteen films between 1956 and 1999. His 1962 film Tyutyun was entered into the 1963 Cannes Film Festival. His 1965 film Bull was entered into the 4th Moscow International Film Festival. His 1971 film Wrathful Journey was entered into the 7th Moscow International Film Festival.

== Death ==
He died on 10 November 2016.

== Filmography ==
- Dimitrovgradtsy (1956)
- Malkata (1959)
- Tyutyun (1962)
- Bull (1965)
- Svoboda ili smart (1969)
- Gnevno patuvane (1971)
- Ivan Kondarev (1974)
- Yuliya Vrevskaya (1978)
- Az ne zhiveya edin zhivot (1981)
- Orisiya (1983)
- Kopnezhi po beliya pat (1987)
- Poverie za beliya vyatar (1990)
- Magia (1999)
