= Ivan Dykhovichny =

Russian film director

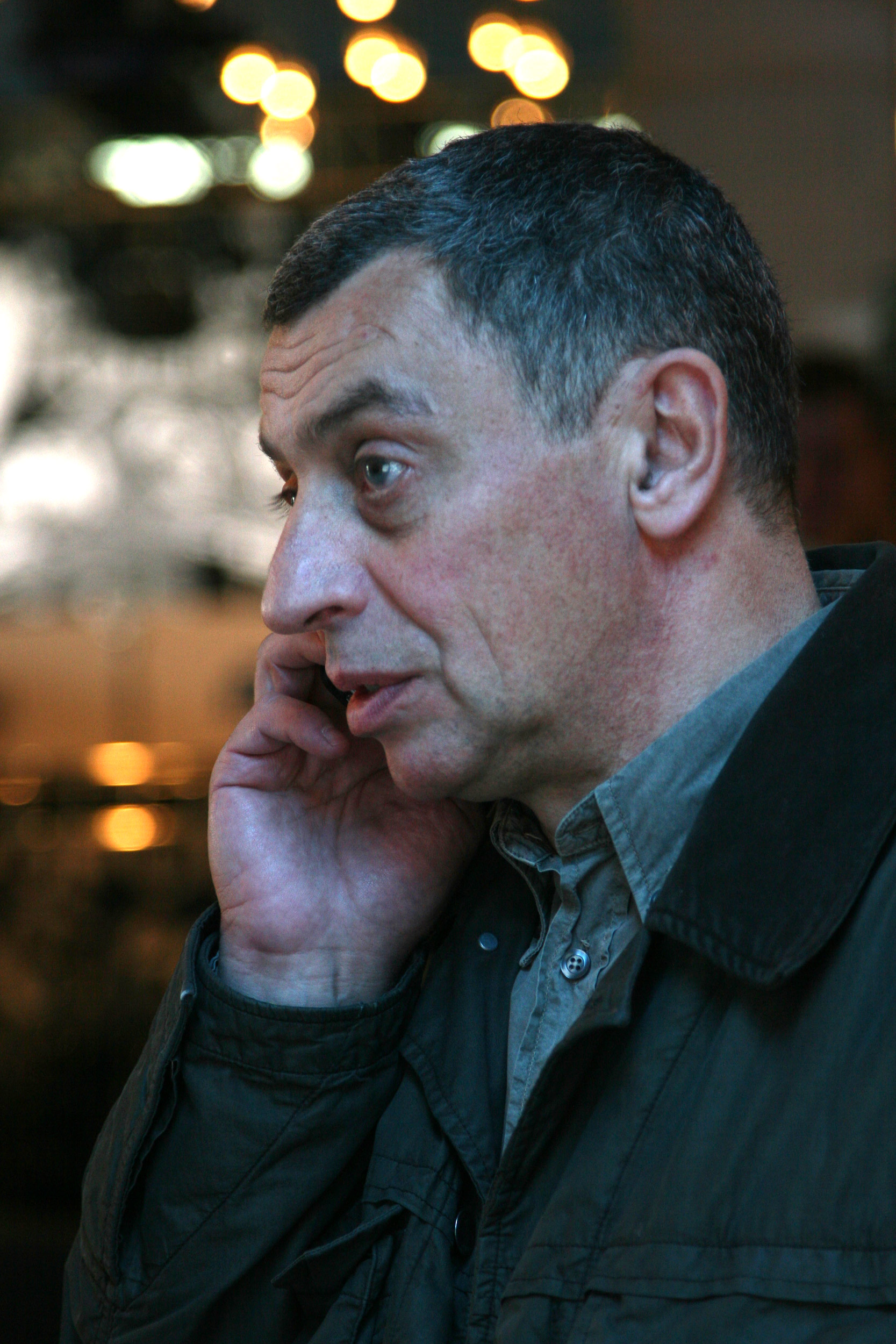
- Born: 16 October 1947; Moscow, Soviet Union
- Died: 27 September 2009 (aged 61); Moscow, Russia
- Occupations: Film director Screenwriter
- Years active: 1970—2009

Ivan Vladimirovich Dykhovichny (Russian: Иван Владимирович Дыховичный, 16 October 1947 – 27 September 2009) was a Russian film director and screenwriter.

He directed ten films between 1984 and 2009. His film Music for December was screened in the Un Certain Regard section at the 1995 Cannes Film Festival.

His father Vladimir Abramovich Dykhovichny (1911–1963) was a well-known Soviet song writer, mother Alexandra Iosifovna Sinani was a ballerina. Dykhovichny was a close friend of Vladimir Vysotsky, who dedicated a long poem to him.

He died at 5:00 a.m. on September 27, 2009, at the age of 61, from lymphoma.

== Filmography ==
- Moscow, My Love (1974) — actor
- Sunday Walks (1984) — actor
- Ispytatel (1985) — director
- The Black Monk (1988) — director, screenwriter
- Prorva (1992) — director, screenwriter
- Women's Role (1994) — director, screenwriter
- Music for December (1995) — director, screenwriter
- Krestonosets 2 (1997) — director, actor
- The Kopeck (2002) — director, screenwriter
- Inhalation-Exhalation (2006) — director
- Europe-Asia (2009) — director
