= Skopje =

Capital and largest city of North Macedonia

Skopje Скопје (Macedonian) Shkup / Shkupi (Albanian)
- Capital city
- Град Скопје; Qyteti i Shkupit; City of Skopje
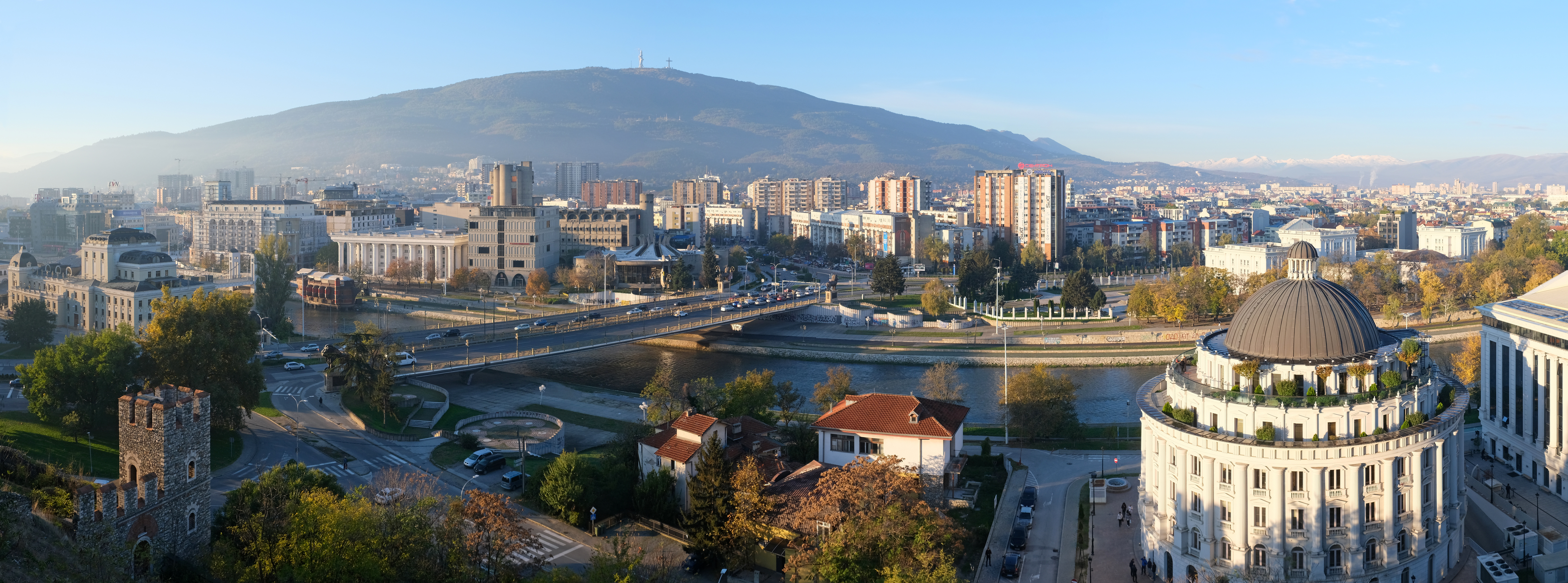
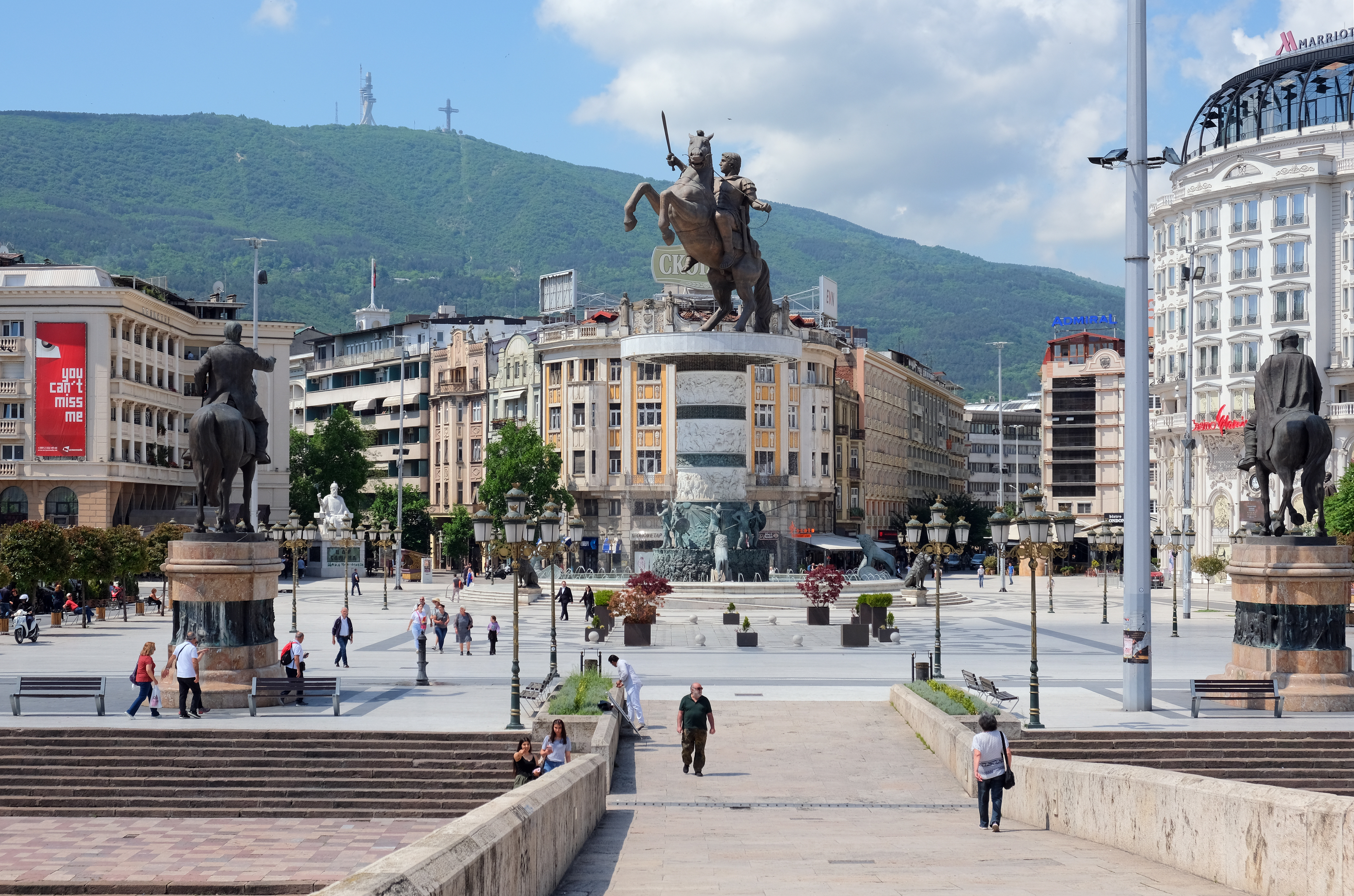
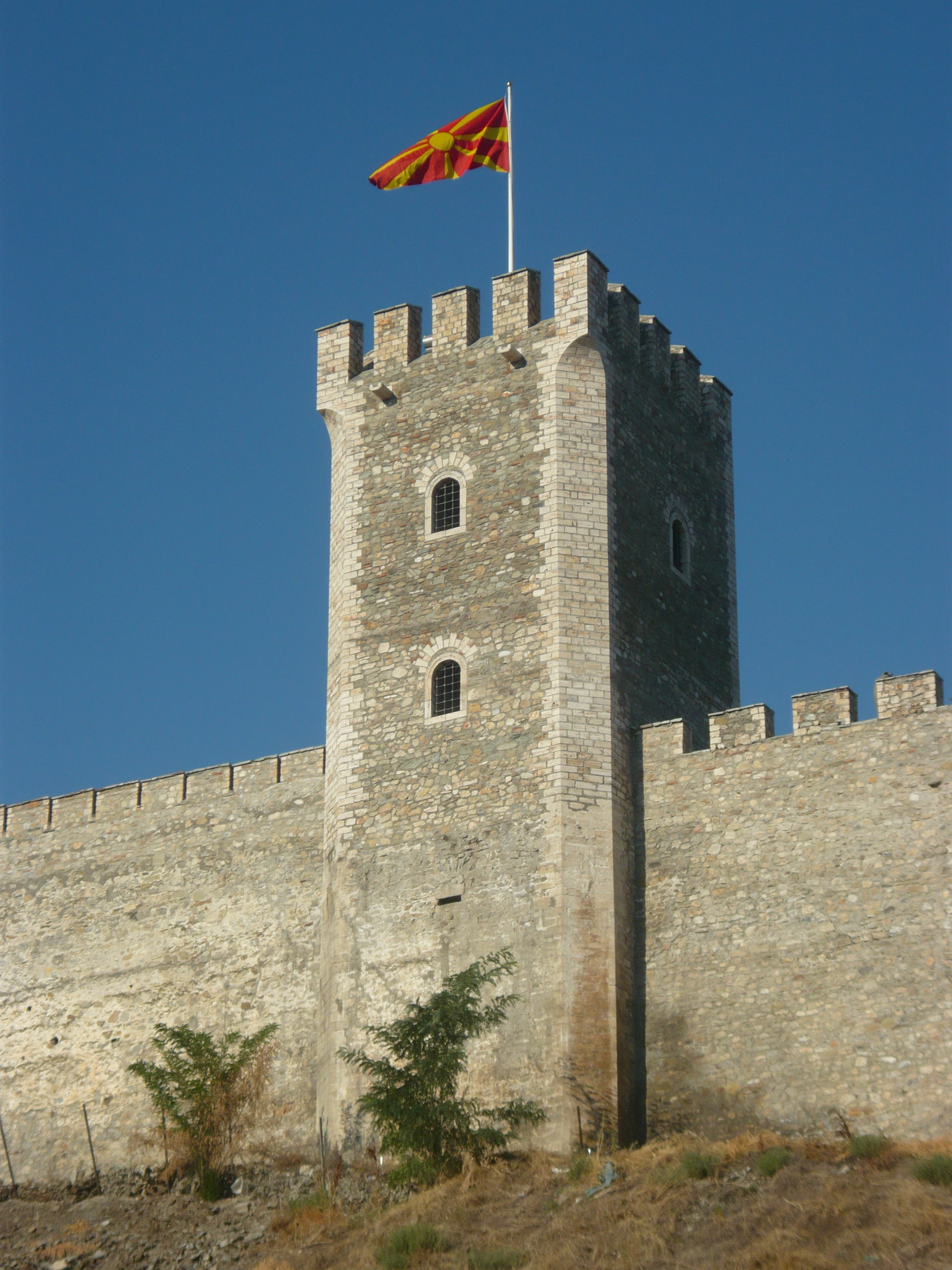
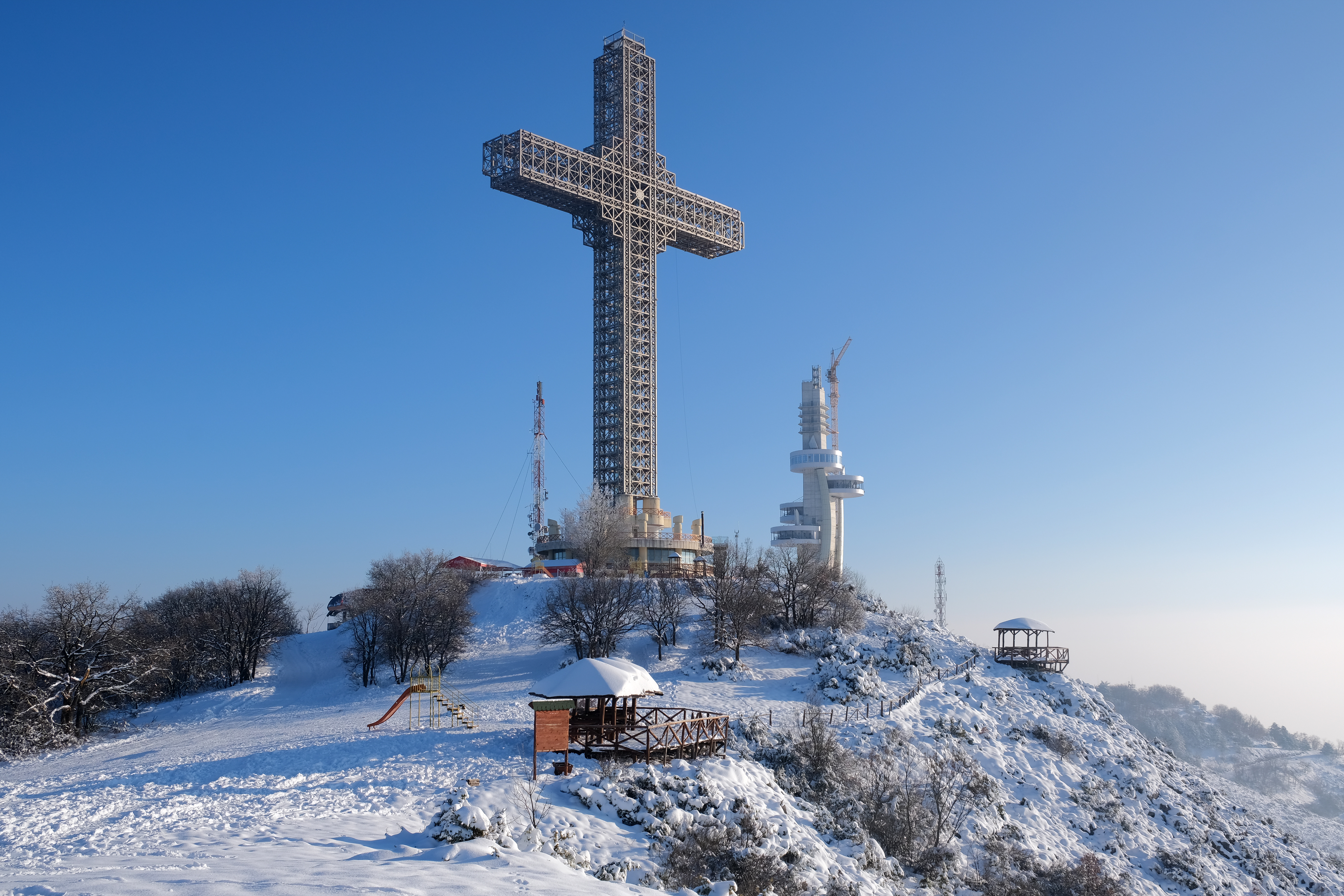
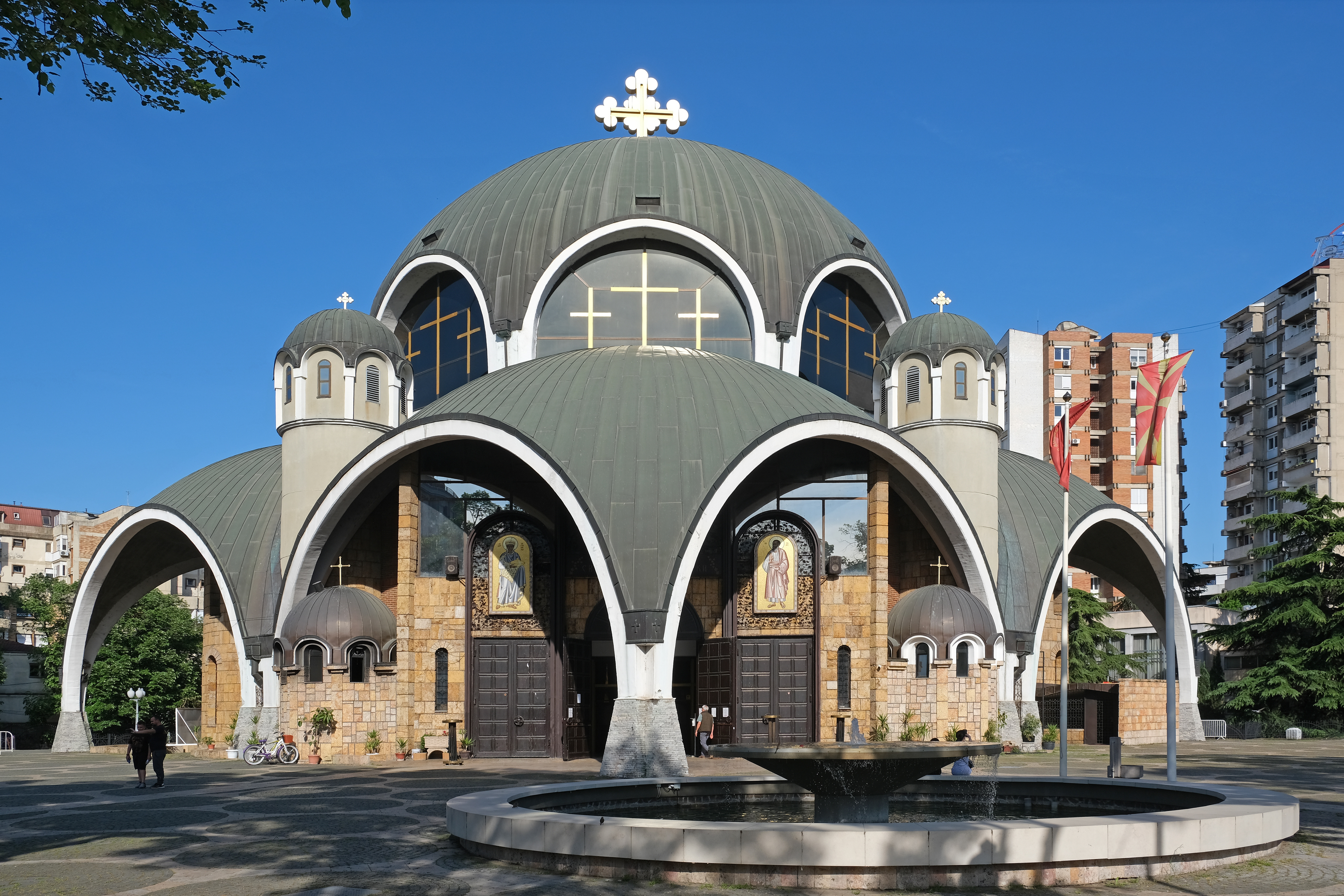
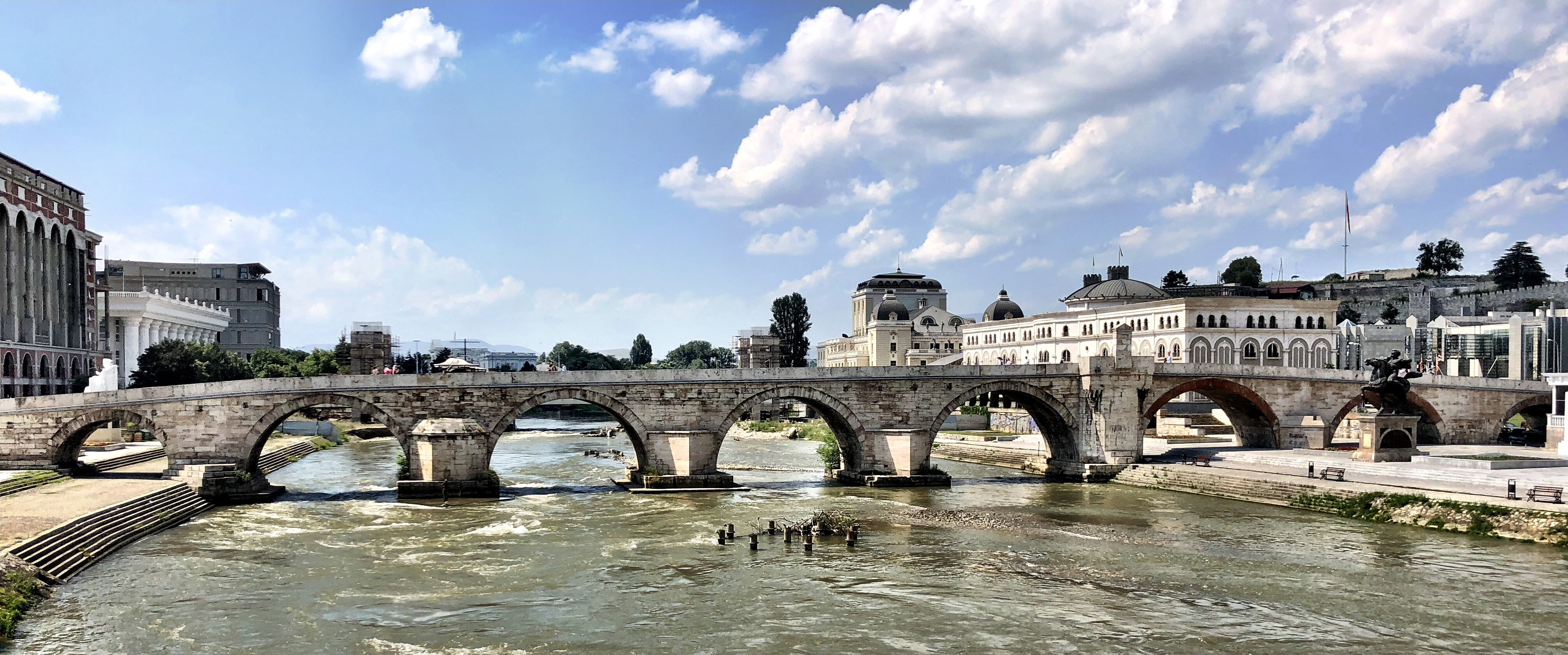
- View over central Skopje with the Vardar river Macedonia Square Skopje Fortress (Kale) Vodno Church of St. Clement of Ohrid Stone Bridge

- Flag Coat of arms
- Interactive map of Skopje
- Location within North Macedonia Location within Europe
- Coordinates: 41°59′46″N 21°25′54″E
- Country: North Macedonia
- Region: Skopje Statistical
- Municipality: Greater Skopje

Government
  - Type: Special unit of local self-government
  - Body: Skopje City Council
  - Mayor: Orce Gjorgjievski (VMRO-DPMNE)

Area
  - Greater Skopje: 571.46 km^{2} (220.64 sq mi)
  - Urban: 337.80 km^{2} (130.43 sq mi)
  - Metro: 1,854.00 km^{2} (715.83 sq mi)
- Elevation: 240 m (790 ft)

Population (2021)
  - Greater Skopje: 526,502
- Demonym(s): Skopjan; Macedonian: Skopjanec/Skopjanka; Скопјанец/Скопјанка; Albanian: Shkupjan (m), Shkupjane (f)

Official Language(s)
  - primary: Macedonian, Albanian

GDP (Nominal, 2023)
  - Greater Skopje: denar 414.4 billion (US$7.95 billion)
  - Per capita: denar 682,511 (US$13,100.02)
- Time zone: UTC+01:00 (CET)
  - Summer (DST): UTC+02:00 (CEST)
- Postal codes: МК-10 00
- Area code: +389 2
- ISO 3166 code: MK-85
- Vehicle registration: SK
- HDI (2023): 0.829 very high · 1st of 8
- Climate: Cfa
- Website: skopje.gov.mk

Skopje (Note: Pronunciations and translations: /ˈskɒpjeɪ/ SKOP-yay, US also /ˈskoʊpjeɪ/ SKOHP-yay; Macedonian: Скопје [ˈskɔpjɛ]; Albanian: Shkup, Albanian definite form: Shkupi) is the capital and largest city of North Macedonia. It lies in the northern part of the country, in the Skopje Valley along the Vardar River, and is the political, economic, and cultural centre of the country. As of the 2021 census, the city had a population of 526,502. Skopje covers 571.46 km^{2} (220.64 mi^{2}) and includes both urban and rural areas, bordered by several municipalities and close to the borders of Kosovo and Serbia.

The area of Skopje has been continuously inhabited since at least the Chalcolithic period. The city — known as Scupi at the time — was founded in the late 1st century during the rule of Domitian, and abandoned in 518 after an earthquake destroyed the city. It was rebuilt under Justinian I. It became a significant settlement under the First Bulgarian Empire, the Serbian Empire (when it served briefly as a capital), and later under the Ottoman Empire, which ruled the city for over five centuries. In 1912, following the Balkan Wars, Skopje was annexed by the Kingdom of Serbia. It became part of Yugoslavia after World War I and, following World War II, became the capital of the Socialist Republic of Macedonia, one of its constituent republics. In 1963, a major earthquake devastated the city, after which it was largely rebuilt with international assistance. Skopje became the capital of independent North Macedonia in 1991.

The city has a diverse population, with ethnic Macedonians forming a majority and Albanians a significant minority, alongside Roma, Turks, Serbs, and others. It is also religiously diverse, with Orthodox Christianity and Islam being the most widely practised faiths. Skopje is the site of major educational and cultural institutions, including the Ss. Cyril and Methodius University, the Macedonian Academy of Sciences and Arts, and the National Theatre.

Skopje is the country's centre of government and business and produces a significant share of the national GDP. Its economy is based on industry, trade, services, and finance. The city has undergone major transformations in recent decades, notably through the controversial Skopje 2014 project, which aimed to reshape the city centre with neoclassical buildings and monuments.

== Name ==
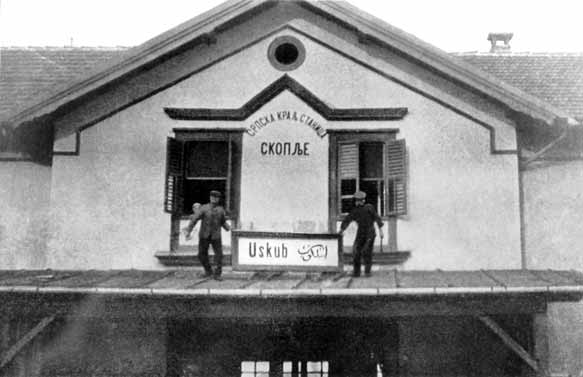
Serbian troops overseeing the city's renaming from "Üsküb" to "Skoplje" following Serbia's annexation of Vardar Macedonia in 1912

The city is attested for the first name in Geography by Ptolemy c. AD 150 as one of the cities of Roman Dardania. Ptolemy describes the city in Latin as Scupi and ancient Greek as Σκοῦποι. The toponym likely belongs to a group of similar Illyrian toponyms which have been transmitted to Slavic languages in the same way as the modern Macedonian toponym Skopje: Skoplje and Uskoplje in Bosnia, Uskoplje in Dalmatia (Croatia).

Shkup, the name of the city in Albanian, developed directly from Roman-era Scupi in agreement with the Albanian phonological development, the basis of evidence of an earlier Albanian settlement in the area. Shkupi is the definite form of Shkup in Albanian. Skopje, the name of the city during the Middle Ages, is the local Slavic (Macedonian) rendition of Scupi. The Ottoman Turkish rendition of the city's name is Üsküb (Ottoman Turkish: اسكوب) and it was adapted in Western languages in "Uskub" or "Uskup", and these two appellations were used in the Western world until 1912. Some Western sources also cite "Scopia" and "Skopia". Scopia is the name of the city in Aromanian.

When Vardar Macedonia was annexed by the Kingdom of Serbia in 1912, the city officially became Skoplje (Serbian Cyrillic: Скопље) and many languages adopted this name. To reflect local pronunciation, the city's name was eventually spelled as Skopje (Macedonian: Скопје) after the Second World War, when standard Macedonian became the official language of the new Socialist Republic of Macedonia.

== Geography ==
=== Topography ===
Skopje is in the north of the country, in the centre of the Balkan peninsula, and approximately halfway between Belgrade and Athens. The city was built in the Skopje Valley, oriented on a west–east axis, along the course of the Vardar river, which flows into the Aegean Sea in Greece. The valley is approximately 20 km (12 mi) wide and it is limited by several mountain ranges to the north and south. These ranges limit the urban expansion of Skopje, which spreads along the Vardar and the Serava, a small river which comes from the north. In its administrative boundaries, the City of Skopje stretches for more than 33 km (21 mi), but it is only 10 km (6.2 mi) wide.

Skopje is approximately 245 m above sea level and covers 571.46 km^{2}. The urbanised area only covers 337 km^{2}, with a density of 65 inhabitants per hectare. Skopje, in its administrative limits, encompasses many villages and other settlements, including Dračevo, Gorno Nerezi and Bardovci. According to the 2021 census, the City of Skopje had 526,502 inhabitants.

The City of Skopje reaches the Kosovo border to the north-east. Clockwise, it is also bordered by the municipalities of Čučer-Sandevo, Lipkovo, Aračinovo, Ilinden, Studeničani, Sopište, Želino and Jegunovce.

The City of Skopje; its administrative limits are in red.

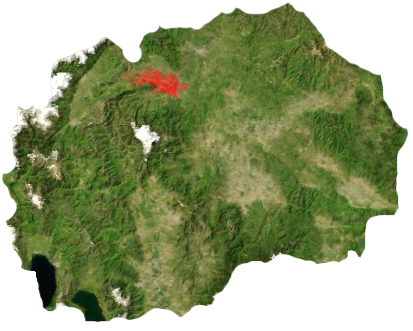
Location of Skopje in North Macedonia

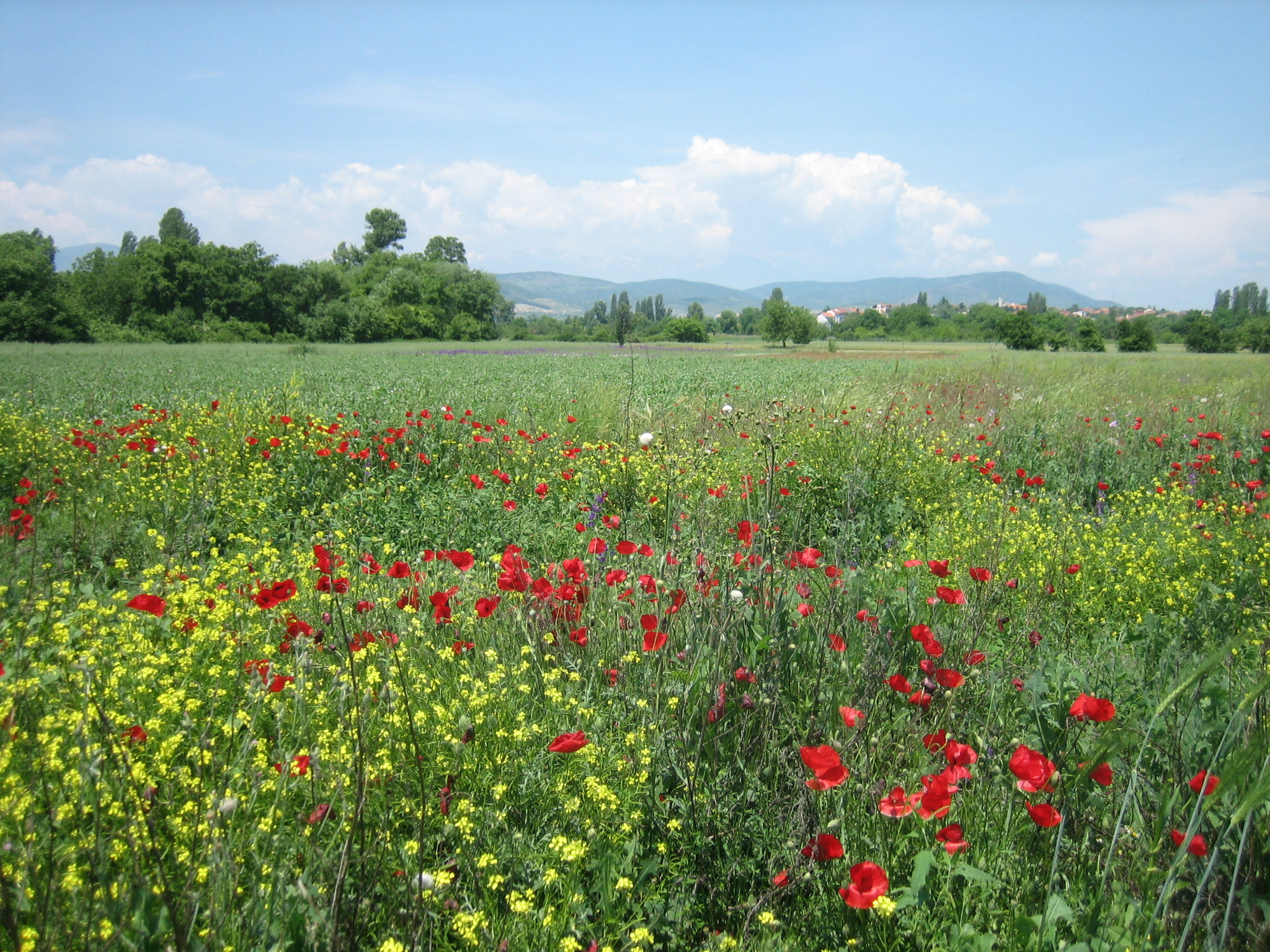
Landscape of the Skopje valley, near Bardovci

=== Hydrography ===
The Vardar river, which flows through Skopje, is at approximately 60 km (37 mi) from its source near Gostivar. In Skopje, its average discharge is 51 m^{3}/s, with a wide amplitude depending on seasons, between 99.6 m^{3}/s in May and 18.7 m^{3}/s in July. The water temperature is between 4.6 °C in January and 18.1 °C in July.

Several rivers meet the Vardar within the city boundaries. The largest is the Treska, which is 130 km (81 mi) long. It crosses the Matka Canyon before reaching the Vardar on the western extremity of the City of Skopje. The Lepenac, coming from Kosovo, flows into the Vardar on the north-western end of the urban area. The Serava, also coming from the north, had flowed through the Old Bazaar until the 1960s when it was diverted towards the west because its waters were very polluted. Originally, it met the Vardar close to the seat of the Macedonian Academy of Sciences and Arts. Nowadays, it flows into the Vardar near the ruins of Scupi. Markova Reka, which originates in Mount Vodno, meets the Vardar at the eastern extremity of the city. These three rivers are less than 70 km (43 mi) long.

The City of Skopje incorporates two artificial lakes, on the Treska. Lake Matka is the result of the construction of a dam in Matka Canyon in the 1930s, and the Treska Lake was dug for leisure purposes in 1978. Three small natural lakes can be found near Smilkovci, on the north-eastern edge of the urban area.

The river Vardar historically caused many floods, such as in 1962, when its outflow reached 1110 m^{3}/s. Several works have been carried out since Byzantine times to limit the risks, and since the construction of the Kozjak dam on the Treska in 1994, the flood risk is close to zero.

The subsoil contains a large water table which is alimented by the Vardar and functions as an underground river. Under the table lies an aquifer contained in marl. The water table is 4 to 12 m under the ground and 4 to 144 m deep. Several wells collect its waters but most of the drinking water used in Skopje comes from a karstic spring in Rašče, west of the city.

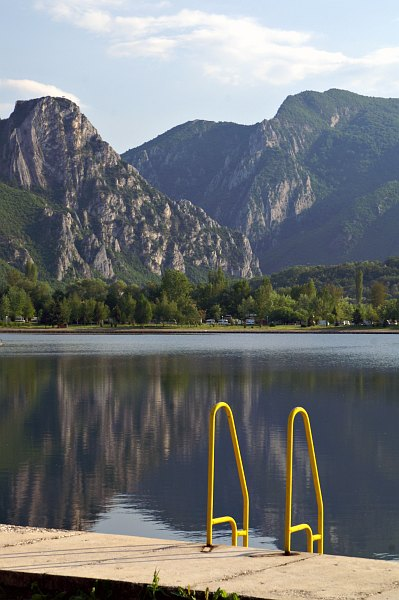
The Treska Lake

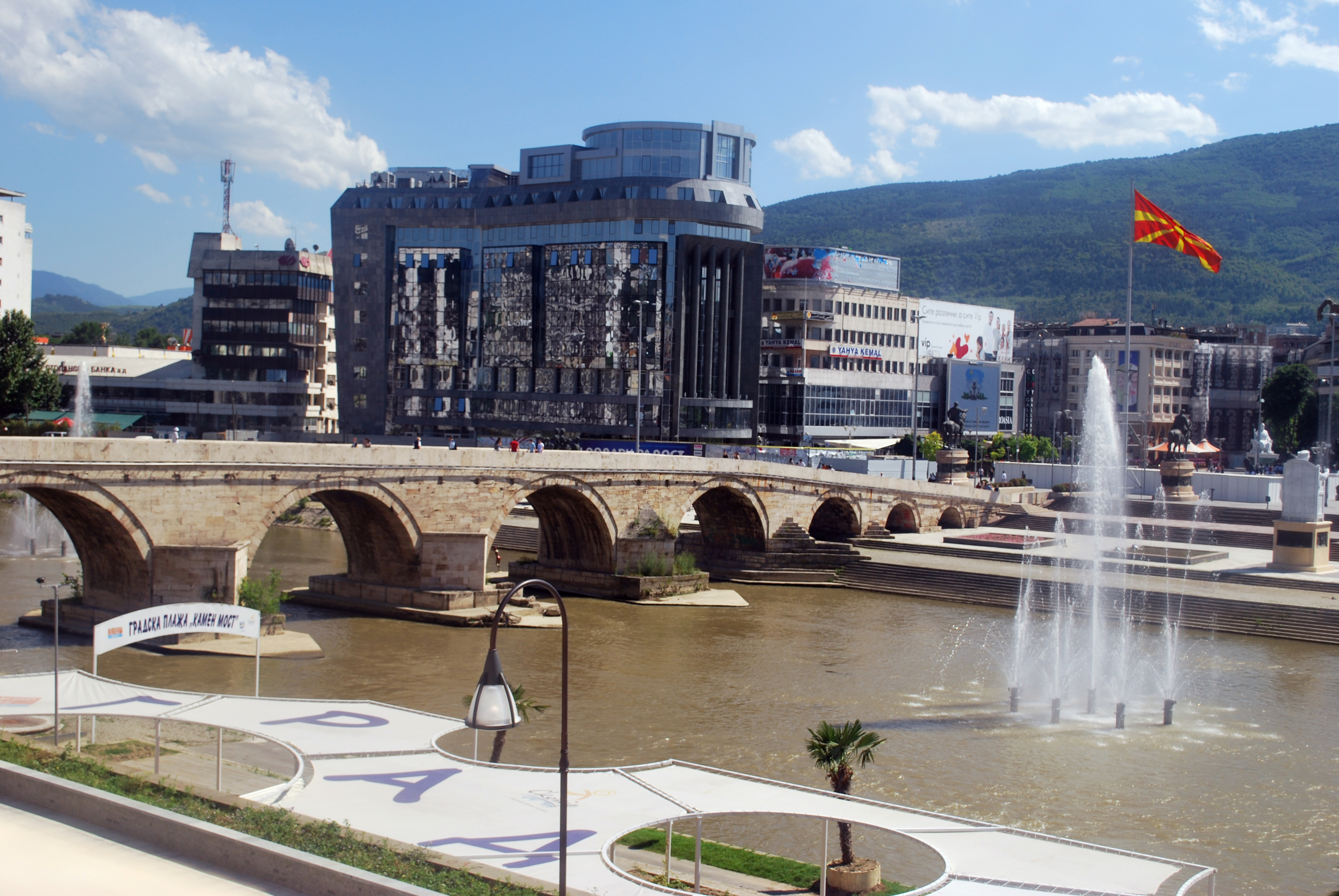
The Vardar and the Stone Bridge, symbol of the city

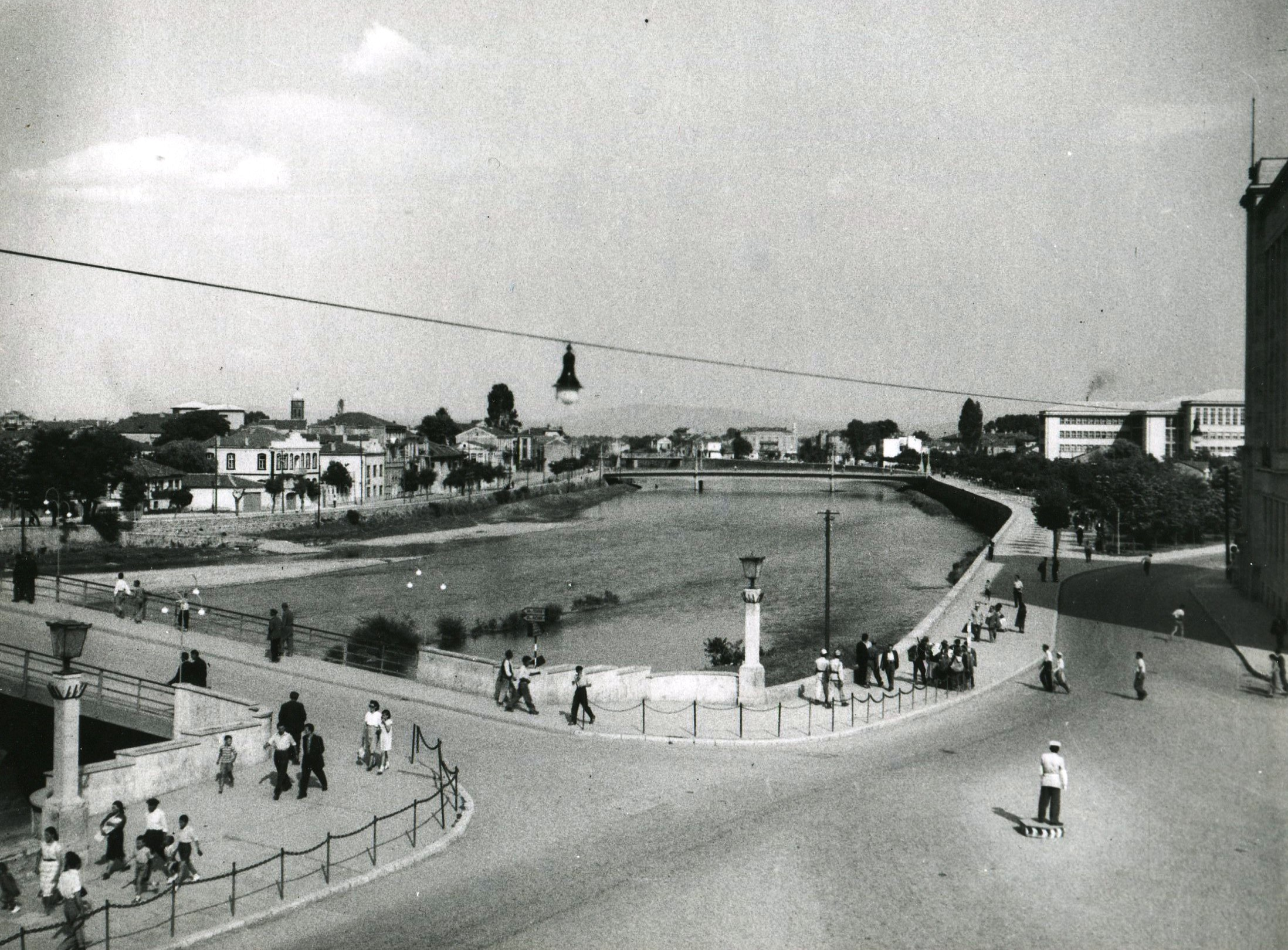
The main river running through the centre of Skopje, c. 1950

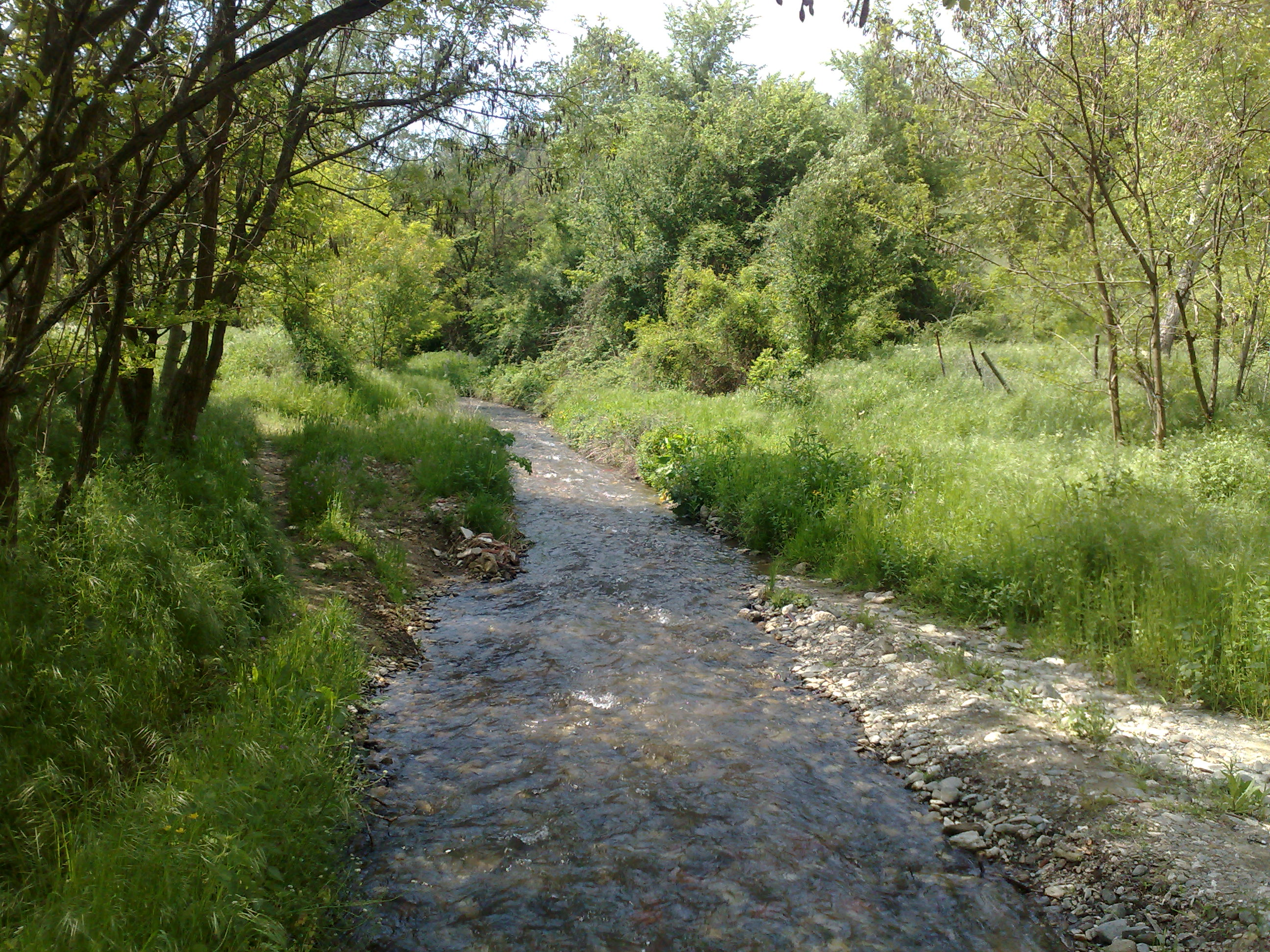
The Serava north of the city

=== Geology ===
The Skopje valley is bordered on the west by the Šar Mountains, on the South by the Jakupica range, on the east by hills belonging to the Osogovo range, and on the north by the Skopska Crna Gora. Mount Vodno, the highest point inside the city limits, is 1066 m high and is part of the Jakupica range.

Although Skopje is built on the foot of Mount Vodno, the urban area is mostly flat. It comprises several minor hills, generally covered with woods and parks, such as Gazi Baba hill (325 m), Zajčev Rid (327 m), the foothills of Mount Vodno (the smallest are between 350 and 400 m high) and the promontory on which Skopje Fortress is built.

The Skopje valley is near a seismic fault between the African and Eurasian tectonic plates and experiences regular seismic activity. This activity in enhanced by the porous structure of the subsoil. Large earthquakes occurred in Skopje in 518, 1555 and 1963.

The Skopje valley belongs to the Vardar geotectonic region, the subsoil of which is formed of Neogene and Quaternary deposits. The substratum is made of Pliocene deposits including sandstone, marl, and various conglomerates. It is covered by a first layer of Quaternary sands and silt, which is between 70 and 90 m deep. The layer is topped by a much smaller layer of clay, sand, silt, and gravel, carried by the Vardar river. It is between 1.5 and 5.2 m deep.

In some areas, the subsoil is karstic. It led to the formation of canyons, such as the Matka Canyon, which is surrounded by ten caves. They are between 20 and 176 m deep.

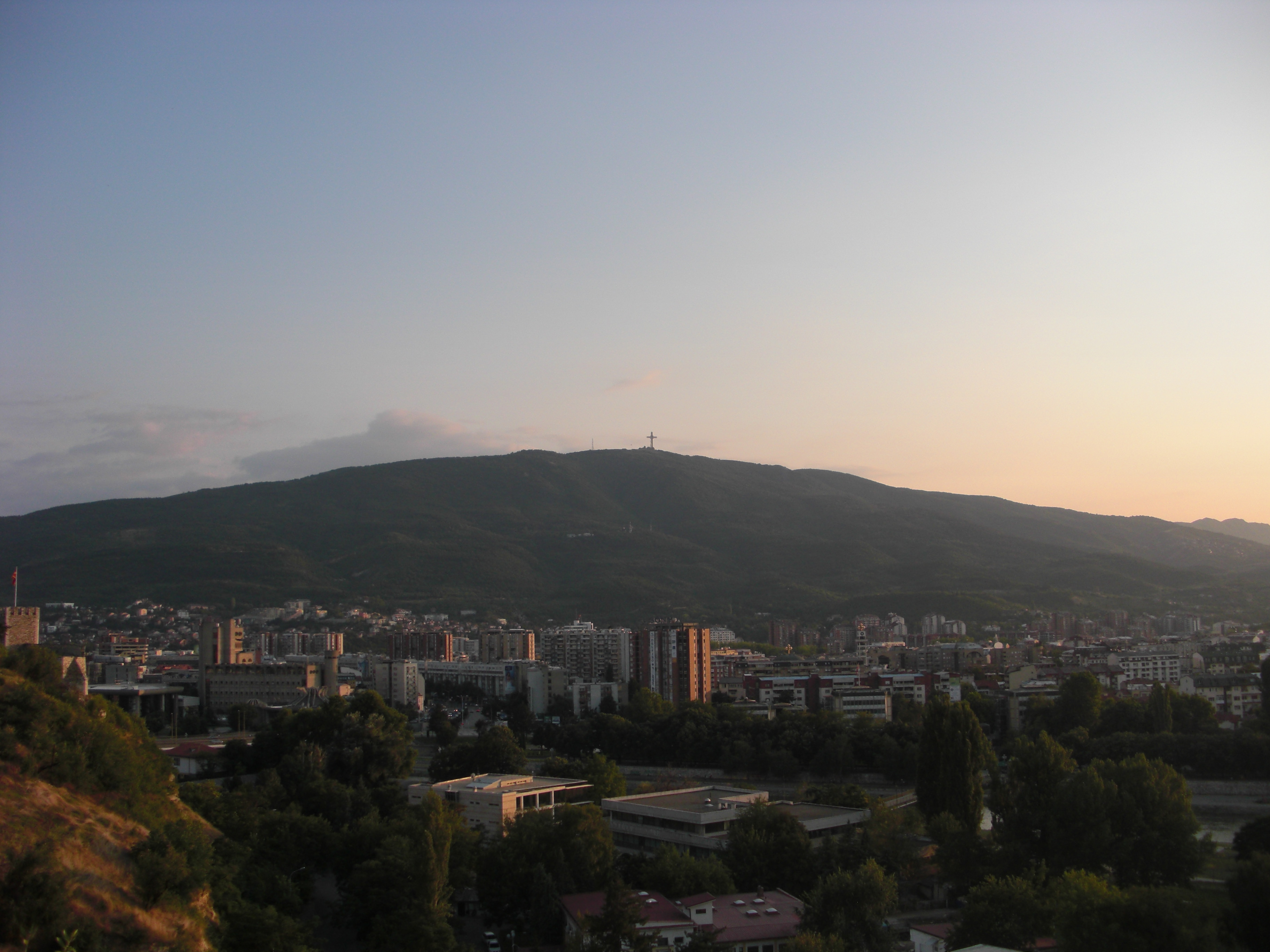
Mount Vodno in the background overlooking Skopje

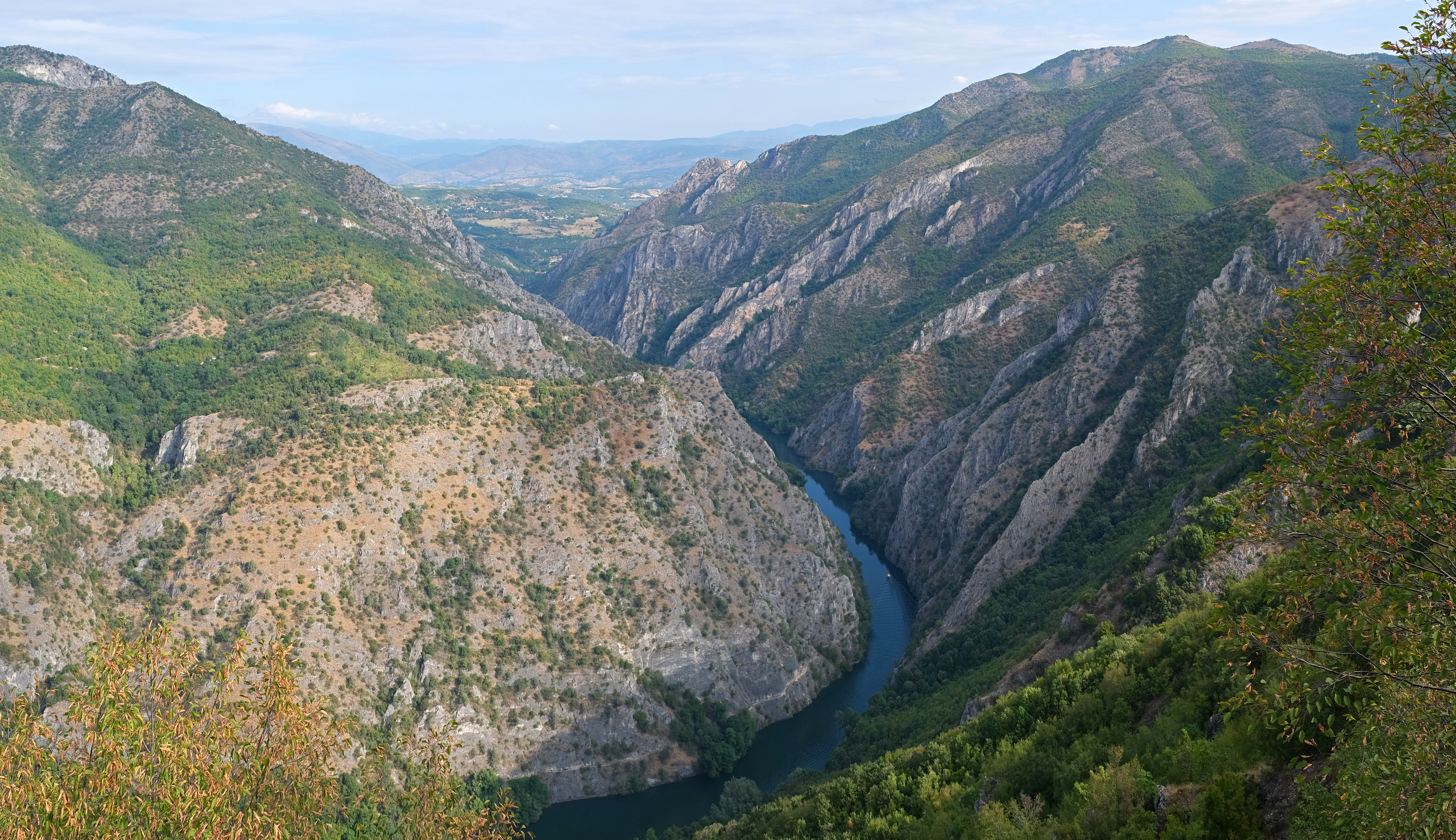
The Matka Canyon on the western edge of the City of Skopje

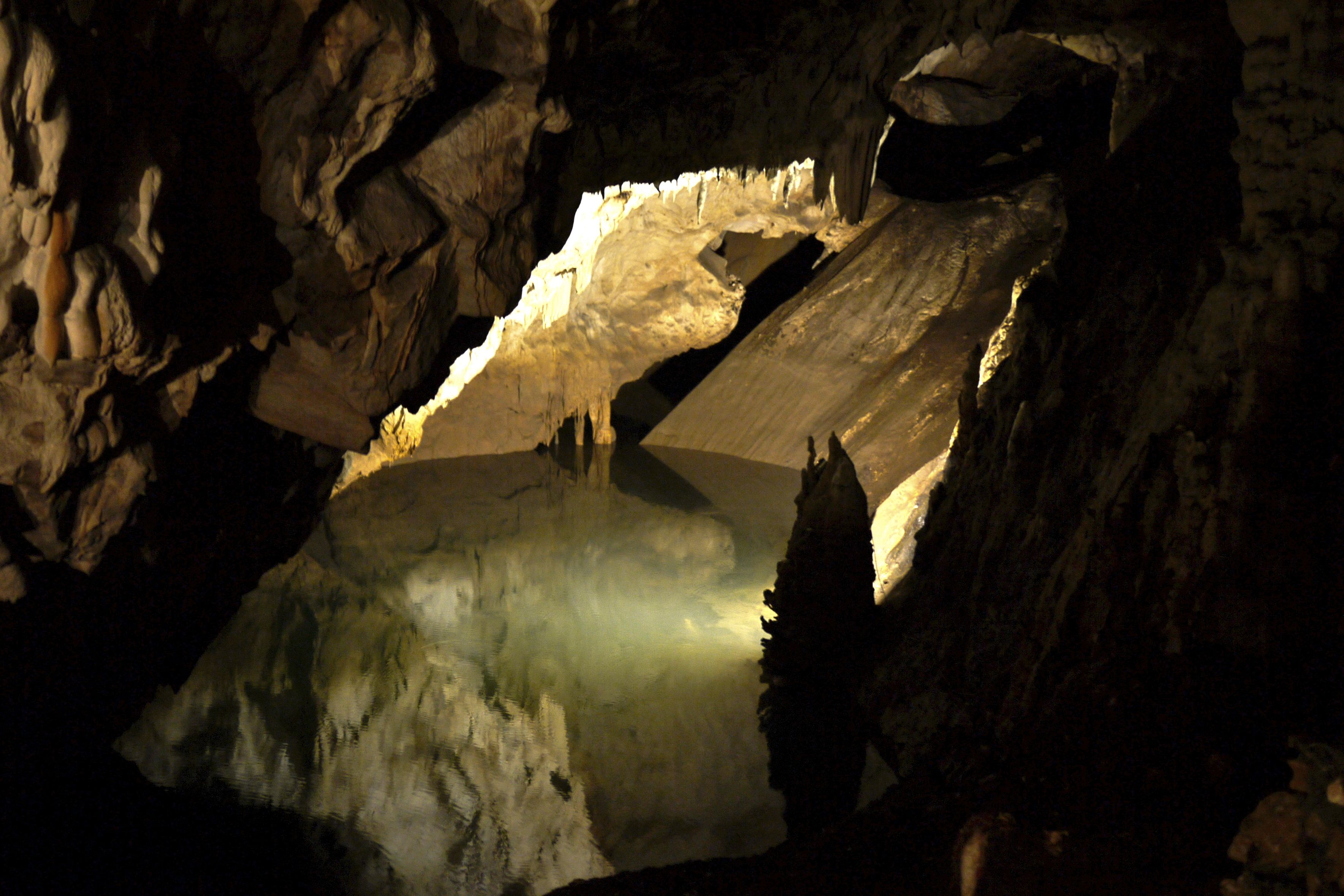
A cave at the Matka Canyon

=== Climate ===
Skopje has a humid subtropical climate (Köppen: Cfa) with a mean annual temperature of 12.6 °C (55 °F). Precipitation is relatively low due to the pronounced rain shadow of the Accursed Mountains to the north-west, being significantly less than what is received on the Adriatic Sea coast at the same latitude. The summers are long, hot and relatively dry with low humidity.

Winters are short, relatively cold and wet. Snowfall is common in the winter period, but heavy snow accumulation is rare and the snow cover lasts only for a few hours or a few days if heavy. In summer, temperatures are usually above 31 °C (88 °F) and sometimes above 40 °C (104 °F). In spring and autumn, the temperatures range from 15 to 24 °C (59 to 75 °F). In winter, the day temperatures are roughly in the range from 5–10 °C (41–50 °F), but at nights they often fall below 0 °C (32 °F) and sometimes below −10 °C (14 °F). Typically, temperatures throughout one year range from −13 °C to 39 °C.

Climate data for Skopje International Airport (1991–2020 normals, extremes 1949–present)
Month	Jan	Feb	Mar	Apr	May	Jun	Jul	Aug	Sep	Oct	Nov	Dec	Year
Record high °C (°F)	19.6 (67.3)	24.6 (76.3)	34.2 (93.6)	35.0 (95.0)	35.8 (96.4)	42.0 (107.6)	43.7 (110.7)	43.2 (109.8)	38.2 (100.8)	33.9 (93.0)	28.4 (83.1)	22.1 (71.8)	43.7 (110.7)
Mean daily maximum °C (°F)	4.8 (40.6)	9.0 (48.2)	14.5 (58.1)	19.4 (66.9)	24.4 (75.9)	29.2 (84.6)	32.0 (89.6)	32.3 (90.1)	26.7 (80.1)	20.1 (68.2)	12.5 (54.5)	5.9 (42.6)	19.2 (66.6)
Daily mean °C (°F)	0.2 (32.4)	3.0 (37.4)	7.7 (45.9)	12.4 (54.3)	17.2 (63.0)	21.7 (71.1)	24.1 (75.4)	24.1 (75.4)	19.0 (66.2)	13.1 (55.6)	6.9 (44.4)	1.8 (35.2)	12.6 (54.7)
Mean daily minimum °C (°F)	−3.3 (26.1)	−1.6 (29.1)	1.9 (35.4)	5.7 (42.3)	10.3 (50.5)	14.3 (57.7)	16.3 (61.3)	16.2 (61.2)	12.2 (54.0)	7.6 (45.7)	2.8 (37.0)	−1.4 (29.5)	6.7 (44.2)
Record low °C (°F)	−25.6 (−14.1)	−22.0 (−7.6)	−19.0 (−2.2)	−6.0 (21.2)	−1.6 (29.1)	3.2 (37.8)	5.8 (42.4)	4.3 (39.7)	−2.3 (27.9)	−6.4 (20.5)	−12.2 (10.0)	−22.9 (−9.2)	−25.6 (−14.1)
Average precipitation mm (inches)	30 (1.2)	29 (1.1)	38 (1.5)	40 (1.6)	43 (1.7)	54 (2.1)	38 (1.5)	36 (1.4)	34 (1.3)	49 (1.9)	45 (1.8)	48 (1.9)	483 (19.0)
Average precipitation days	10	9	10	10	11	10	7	6	6	7	9	11	106
Average snowy days	5	5	3	0.2	0	0	0	0	0	0.1	2	5	20
Average relative humidity (%)	83	75	68	66	66	61	56	56	63	74	82	85	70
Mean monthly sunshine hours	86.9	112.5	161.1	198.4	245.2	276.3	323.0	305.4	247.5	188.2	114.8	79.6	2,339
Source 1: World Meteorological Organization (precipitation days)
Source 2: NOAA (sun, 1961–1990), UHMR (extremes, 1951–present)

View of Skopje city center and the Stone Bridge from Kale Fortress (2026)

=== Environment ===
The City of Skopje encompasses various natural environments, having diverse fauna and flora. However, it is threatened by the intensification of agriculture and urban extension. The largest protected area within the city limits is Mount Vodno, which is a popular leisure destination. A cable car connects its peak to the downtown, and many pedestrian paths run through its woods. Other large natural spots include the Matka Canyon.

The city itself comprises several parks and gardens amounting to 4,361 hectares. Amongst these are the City Park, built by the Ottoman Turks at the beginning of the 20th century; Žena Borec Park, in front of the Parliament; the university arboretum; and the Gazi Baba forest. Many streets and boulevards are planted with trees.

Steel processing—a crucial activity for the local economy—is responsible for soil pollution with heavy metals such as lead, zinc and cadmium, and air pollution with nitrogen oxide and carbon monoxide. Vehicle traffic and district heating plants are also responsible for air pollution.

Water treatment plants are being built, but much of the polluted water is still being discharged untreated into the Vardar. Waste is disposed of in the open-air municipal landfill site, 15 km (9.3 mi) north of the city. Every day, it receives 1,500 m^{3} of domestic waste and 400 m^{3} of industrial waste. Health levels are better in Skopje than in the rest of North Macedonia, and no link has been found between the low environmental quality and the health of the residents.

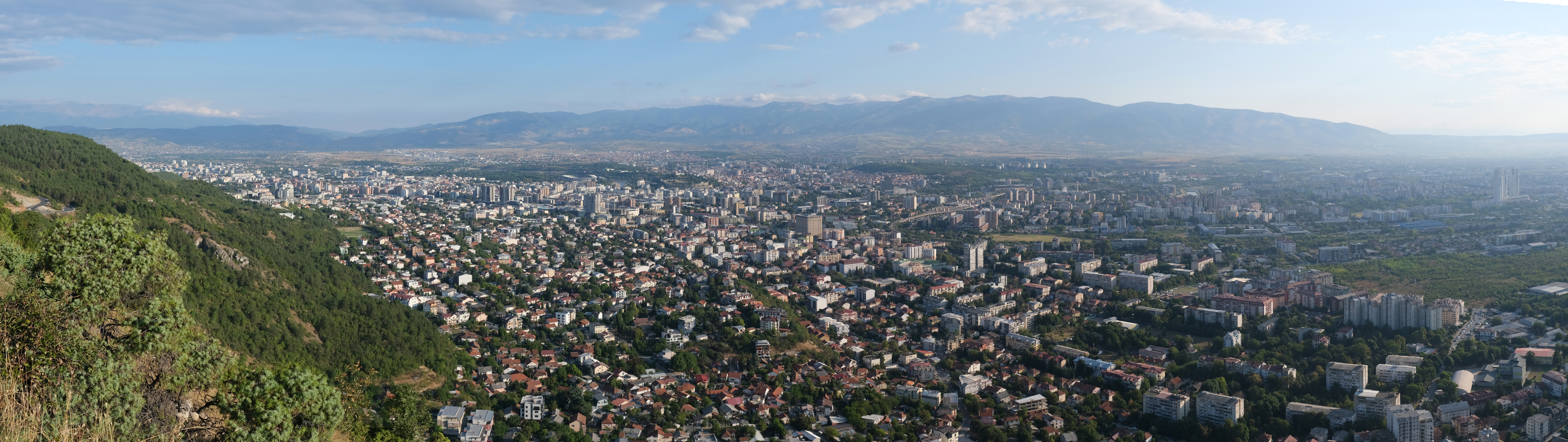
A panoramic view of Skopje as seen from Mount Vodno.

== Urbanism ==
=== Urban morphology ===
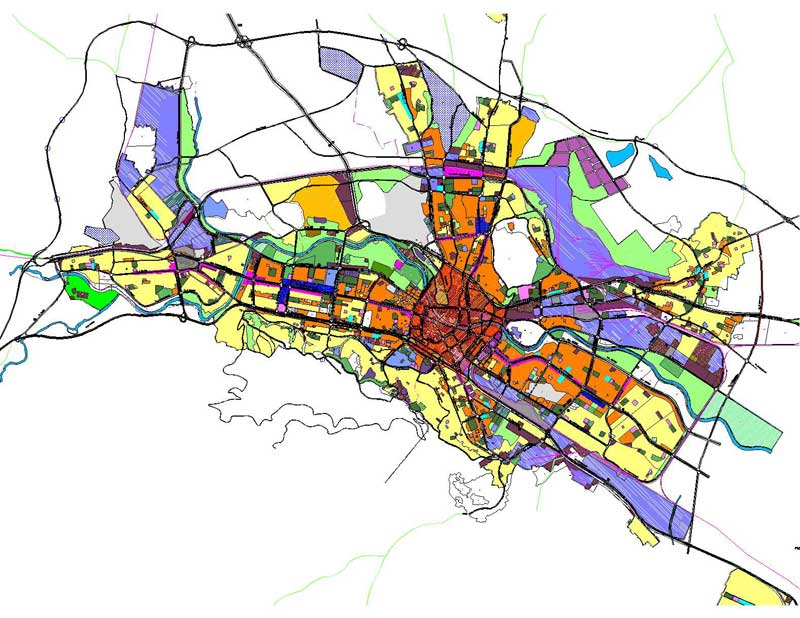
Skopje urban plan for 2002–2020: City centre Collective housing Individual housing Industrial areas

The urban morphology of Skopje was deeply impacted by the 1963 earthquake, which destroyed 80% of the city, and by its subsequent reconstruction. For instance, neighbourhoods were rebuilt in such a way that the demographic density remains low to limit the impact of potential future earthquakes.

Reconstruction following the 1963 earthquake was mainly conducted by the Polish architect Adolf Ciborowski, who had already planned the reconstruction of Warsaw after World War II. Ciborowski divided the city into blocks dedicated to specific activities. The banks of the Vardar river became natural areas and parks, areas between the main boulevards were built with high-rise housing and shopping centres, and the suburbs were left to individual housing and industry. Reconstruction had to be quick to relocate families and to relaunch the local economy. To stimulate economic development, the number of thoroughfares was increased, and future urban extension was anticipated.

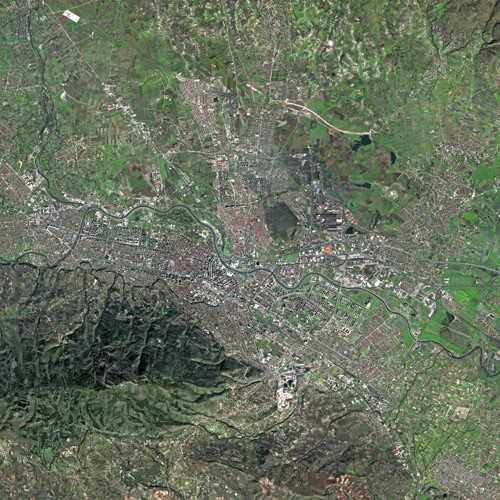
Skopje as seen by the SPOT satellite. Mount Vodno is visible on the bottom left of the picture.

The south bank of the Vardar River generally comprises high-rise tower blocks, including the vast Karpoš neighbourhood which was built in the 1970s west of the city centre. Towards the east, the new municipality of Aerodrom was planned in the 1980s to house 80,000 inhabitants on the site of the old airport. Between Karpoš and Aerodrom lies the city centre, rebuilt according to plans by Japanese architect Kenzo Tange. The centre is surrounded by a row of long buildings suggesting a wall (Gradski Zid).

On the north bank, where the most ancient parts of the city lie, the Old Bazaar was restored and its surroundings were rebuilt with low-rise buildings, so as not to spoil views of the Skopje Fortress. Several institutions, including the university and the Macedonian Academy of Sciences and Arts, were also relocated to the north bank to reduce borders between the ethnic communities. The north bank is mostly inhabited by Muslim Albanians, Turks, and Roma, whereas Christian ethnic Macedonians predominantly reside on the south bank.

The earthquake left the city with few historical monuments, apart from the Ottoman-era Old Bazaar, and the reconstruction, conducted between the 1960s and 1980s, turned Skopje into a modernist city. At the end of the 2000s, the city centre experienced profound changes. A highly controversial urban project, Skopje 2014, was adopted by the municipal authorities to give the city a more monumental and historical aspect, and thus to transform it into a proper national capital. Several neoclassical buildings destroyed in the 1963 earthquake were rebuilt, including the national theatre, and the streets and squares were refurbished. Many other elements were also built, including fountains, statues, hotels, government buildings and bridges. The project has been criticised because of its cost and its historicist aesthetics. The large Albanian minority felt it was not represented in the new monuments, and launched side projects, including a new square over the boulevard that separates the city centre from the Old Bazaar.

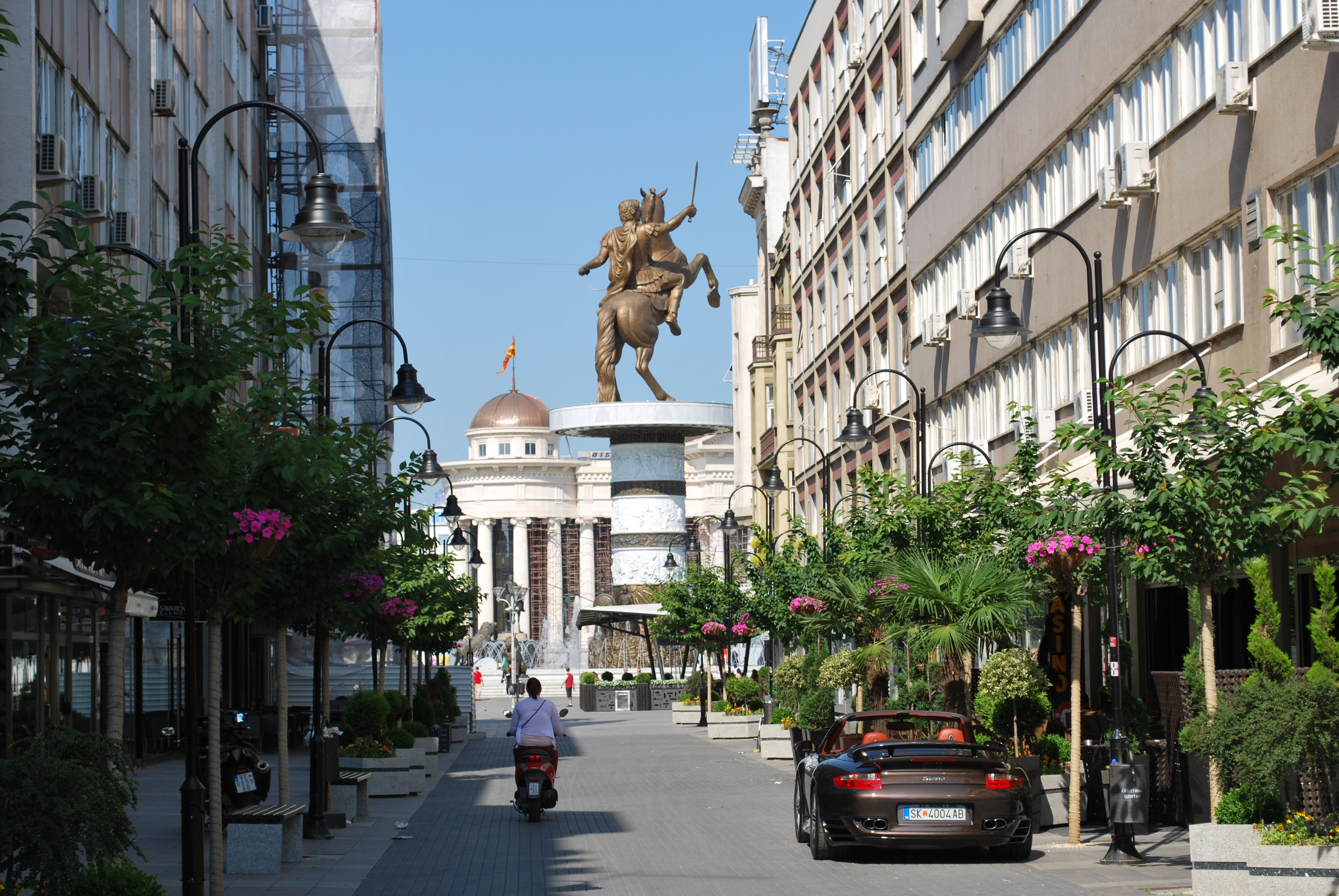
Vapcarov Street, located in the city centre

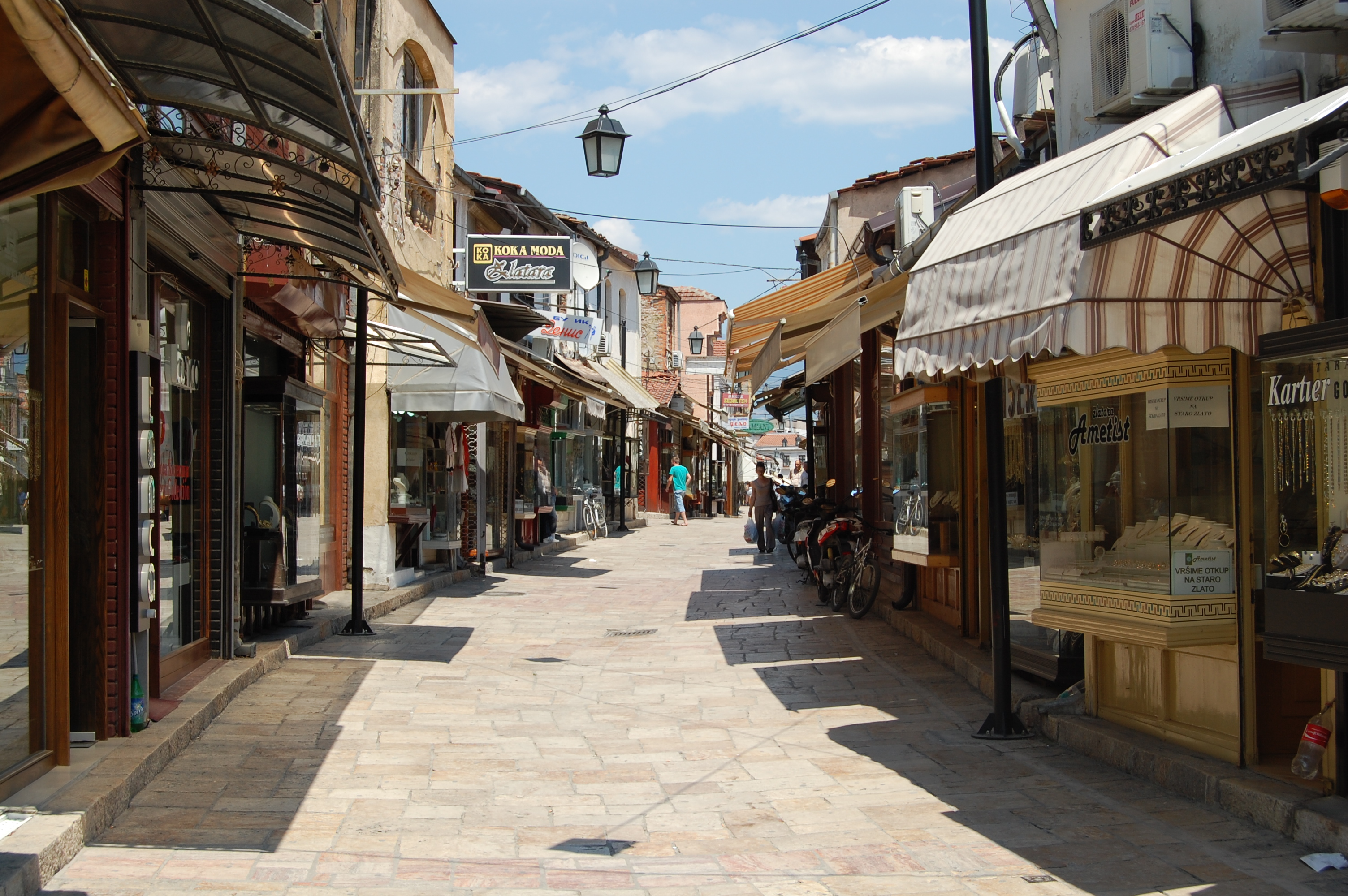
A street in the Old Bazaar

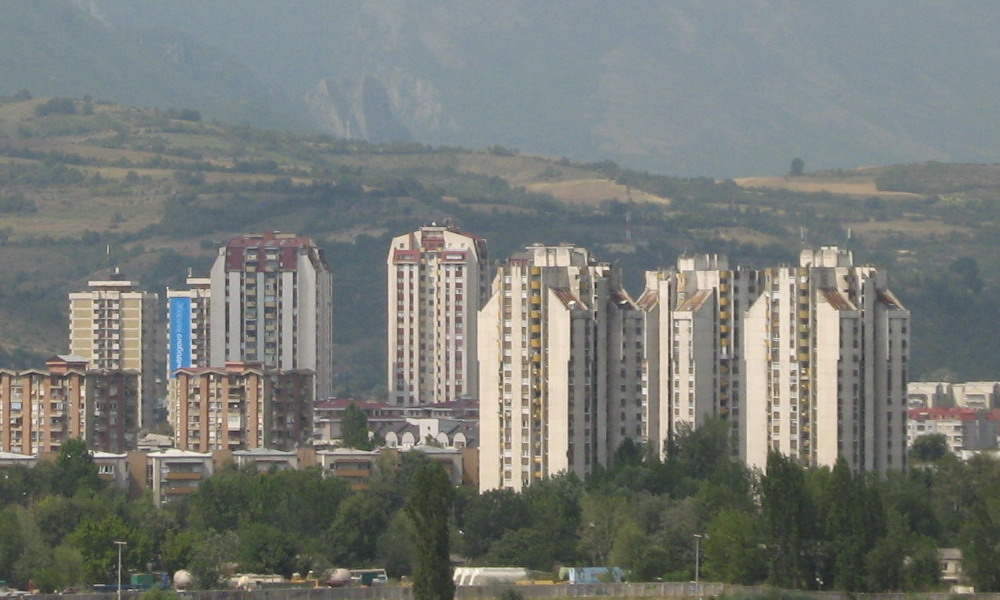
High-rise housing in Karpoš

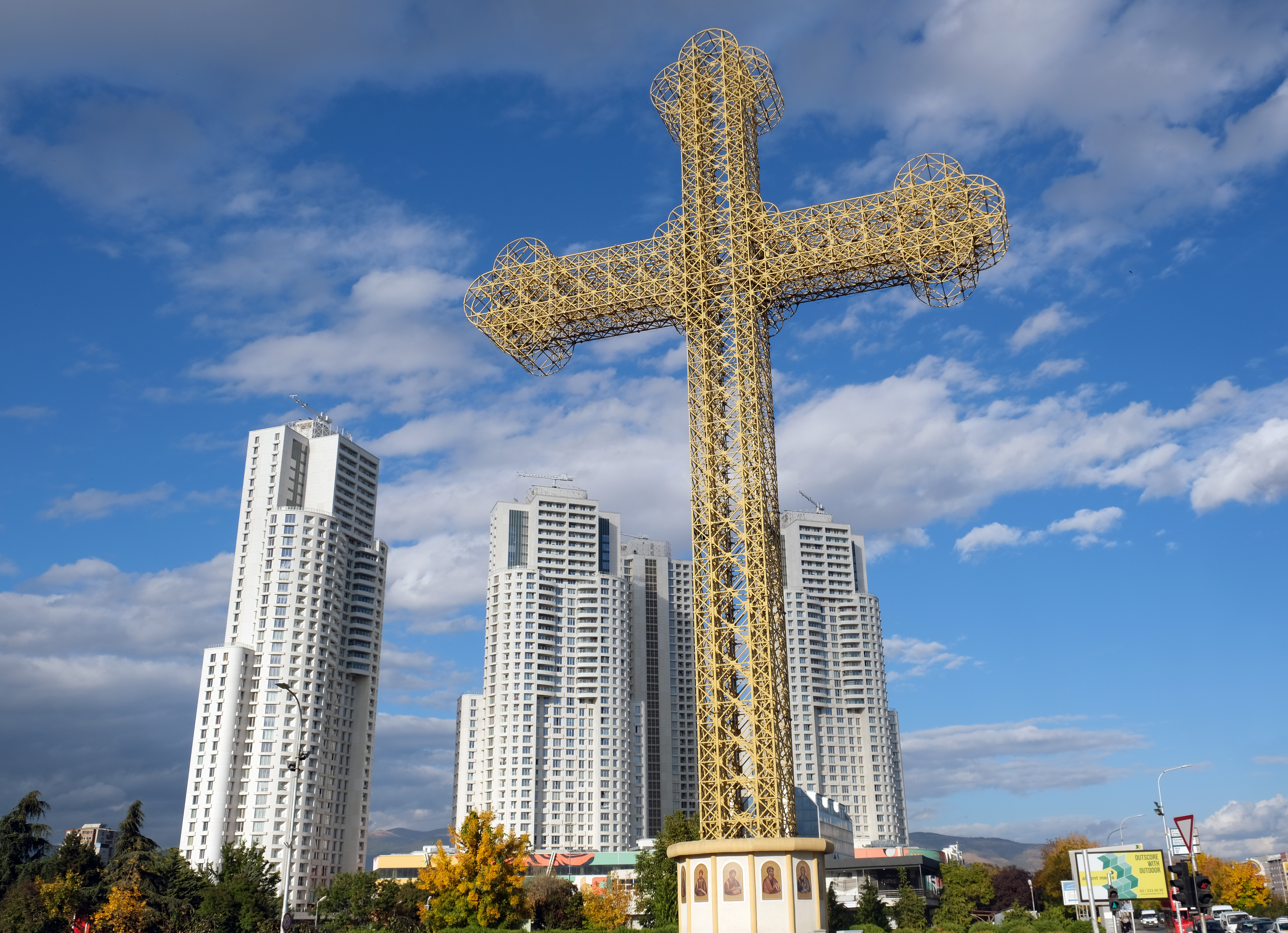
The Macedonian Cross and Cevahir Towers

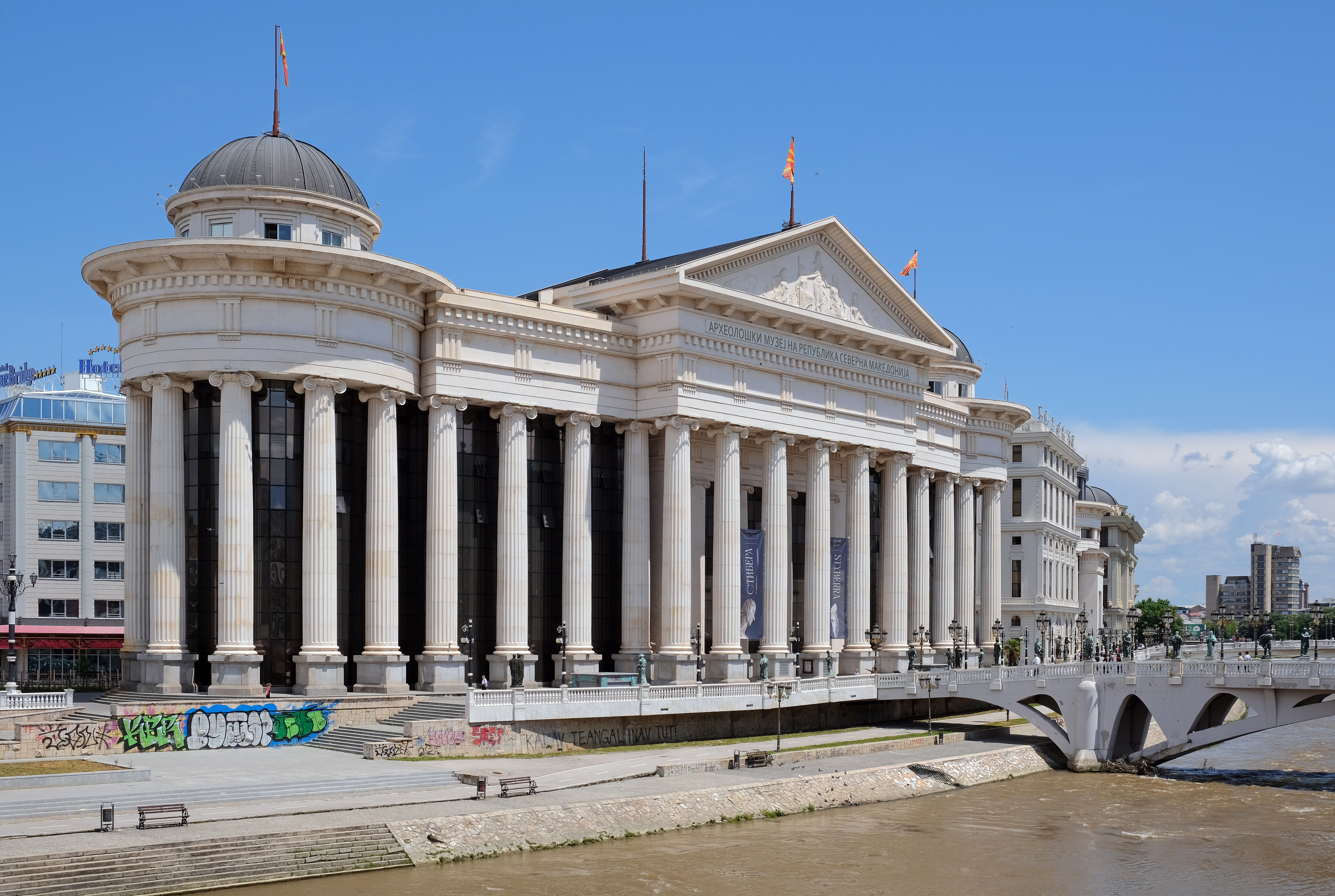
The archeological museum, one of the elements of Skopje 2014

=== Urban sociology ===
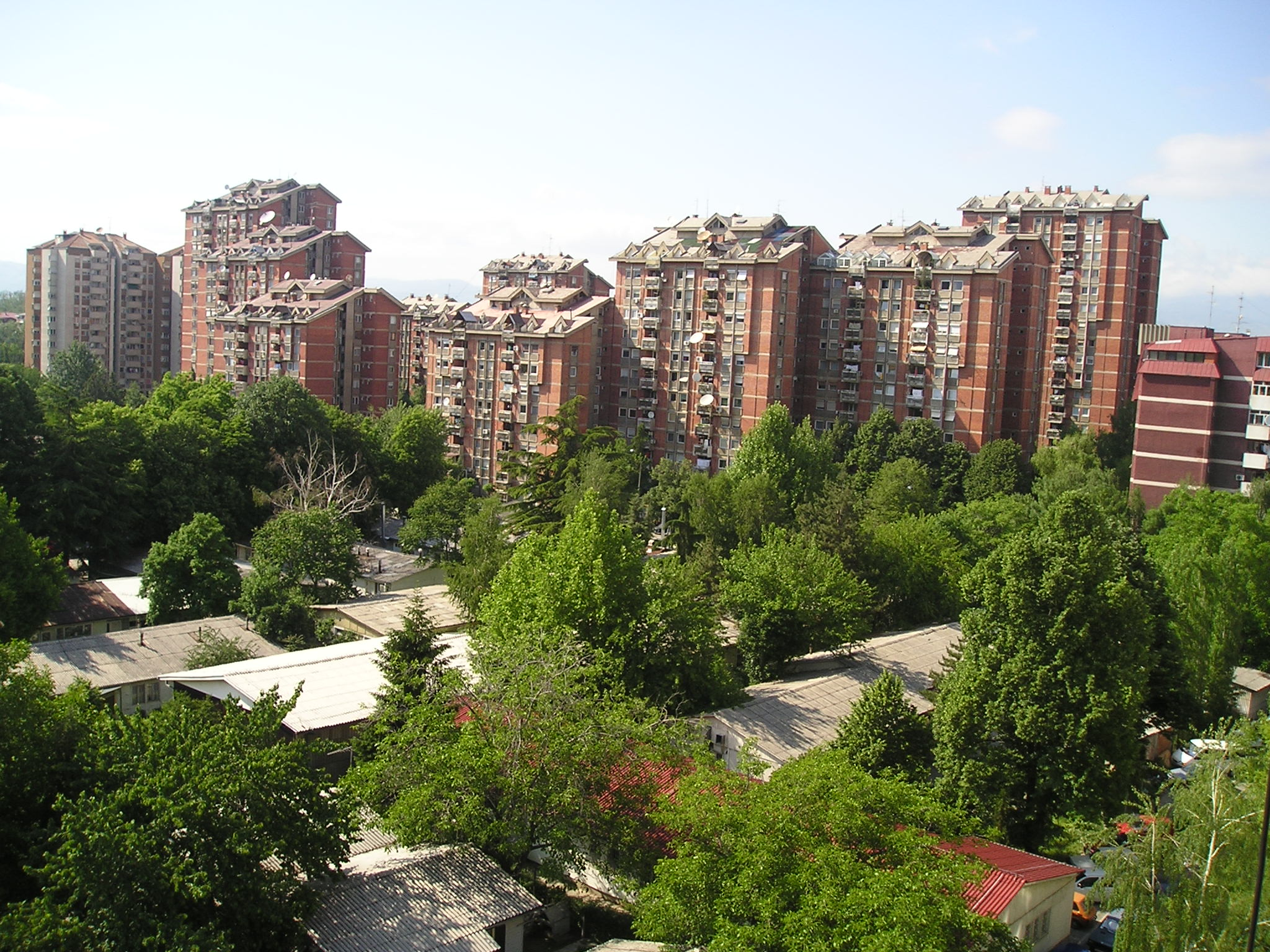
Kapištec neighbourhood, developed during the 1970s. Some post-earthquake prefabricated houses can be seen in the foreground.

Skopje is an ethnically diverse city, and its urban sociology primarily depends on ethnic and religious affiliation. Macedonians form 66% of the city population, whilst Albanians and Roma account respectively for 20% and 6%. Each ethnic group generally self-segregates itself to certain areas of the city. Macedonians live south of the Vardar in areas massively rebuilt after 1963, whilst Muslims live on the northern side, in the oldest neighbourhoods of the city. These neighbourhoods are considered more traditional, whereas the south side evokes modernity to Macedonians.

The northern areas are the poorest; this is especially true for Topaana, in Čair municipality, and for Šuto Orizari municipality, which are the two main Roma neighbourhoods. They are made of many illegal constructions not connected to the electric grid nor water supply, which are passed from one generation to another. Topaana, close to the Old Bazaar, is a very old area: it was first mentioned as a Roma neighbourhood in the beginning of the 14th century. It has between 3,000 and 5,000 inhabitants. Šuto Orizari, on the northern edge of the city, is a municipality of its own, with Romani as its local official language. It was developed after the 1963 earthquake to accommodate Roma who had lost their homes.

The population density varies greatly from one area to another. So does the size of the living area per person. The city average was at 19.41 m^{2} (208.93 sq ft) per person as of 2002, but at 24 m^{2} (258 sq ft) in Centar on the south bank, and only 14 m^{2} (151 sq ft) in Čair on the north bank. In Šuto Orizari, the average was at 13 m^{2} (140 sq ft).

=== Localities and villages ===
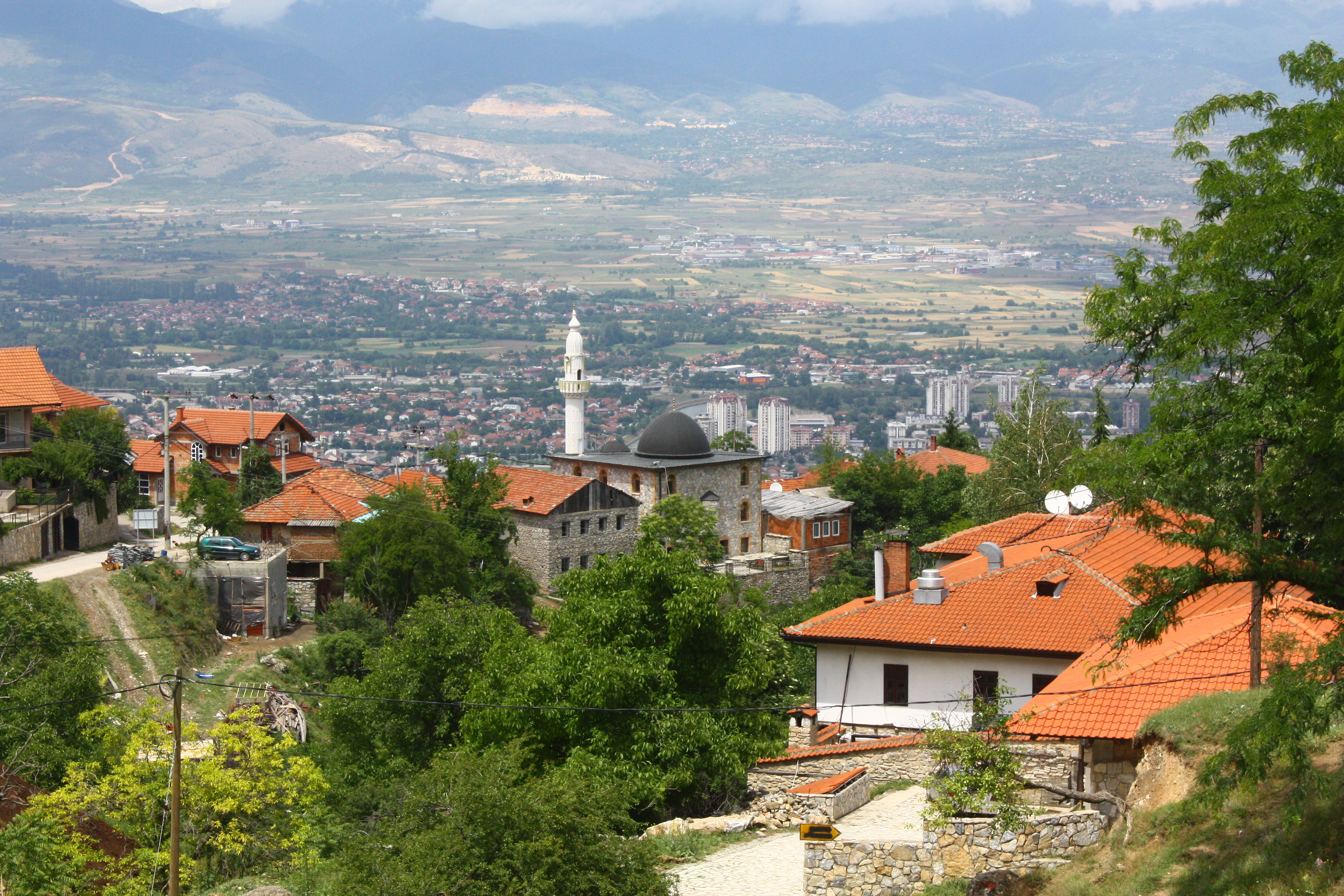
Gorno Nerezi, a village on the northern side of Mount Vodno

Outside of the urban area, the City of Skopje encompasses many small settlements. Some of them are becoming outer suburbs, such as Čento, on the road to Belgrade, which has more than 23,000 inhabitants, and Dračevo, which has almost 20,000 inhabitants. Other large settlements are north of the city, such as Radišani, with 9,000 inhabitants, whereas smaller villages can be found on Mount Vodno or in Saraj municipality, which is the most rural of the ten municipalities that form the City of Skopje.

Some localities outside the city limits are also becoming outer suburbs, particularly in Ilinden and Petrovec municipality. They benefit from the presence of major roads, railways, and the airport, Skopje International, in Petrovec.

=== Pollution ===
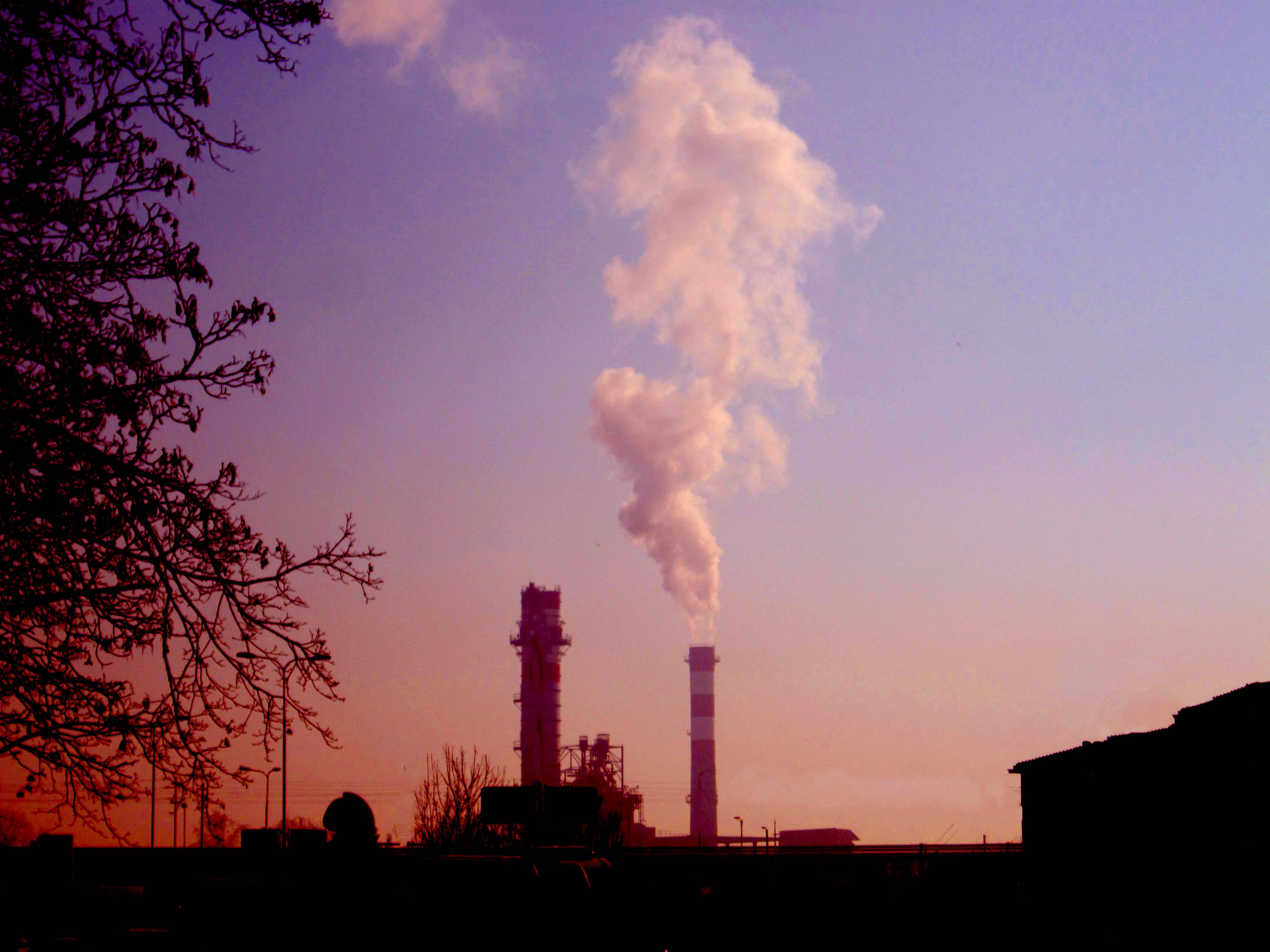
Pollution contributors in the area of Skopje

Air pollution is a serious problem in Skopje, especially in winter. Concentrations of certain types of particulate matter (PM2 and PM10) are regularly over twelve times the WHO-recommended maximum levels. In winter, smoke regularly obscures vision and can lead to problems for motorists. Together with Kosovo and Bosnia and Herzegovina, North Macedonia has the most polluted urban areas in Europe.

Skopje's high levels of pollution are caused by a combination of smoke from houses, emissions from the industry, public and private transport, and a general lack of interest in caring for the environment. Central heating is often not affordable, and so households often burn firewood, as well as used car tyres, plastic waste, petroleum, and other possibly flammable waste, which emits toxic chemicals harmful to the population, especially to children and the elderly.

The city's smog has reduced its air quality and affected the health of many of its citizens, with the average lifespan in Skopje being reduced by between two to three years due to this pollution.

Fog over Skopje seen from Millennium Cross Cableway, Vodno.

An application called AirCare (Macedonian: МојВоздух, romanized: MojVozduh) has been launched by local eco-activist Gorjan Jovanovski to help citizens track pollution levels. It uses a traffic light system, with purple for heavily polluted air, red for high levels detected, amber for moderate levels detected, and green for when the air is safe to inhale. The application relies on both government and volunteer sensors to track hourly air pollution. Unfortunately, government sensors are frequently inoperable and malfunctioning, causing the need for more low-cost, but less accurate, volunteer sensors to be put up by citizens. Faults on government sensors are especially frequent when the pollution is measured is extremely high, according to the AQILHC (Air Quality Index Levels of Health Concern).

Skopje topped the ranks in December 2017 as one of the most polluted cities in the world. In 2017, as part of the city's efforts to reduce pollution, a CityTree was installed, and promoted by German ambassador Christine Althauser.

On 29 November 2019, a march, organised by the Skopje Smog Alarm activist community, attracted thousands of people who opposed the government's lack of action in dealing with the city's pollution, which has worsened since 2017, contributing to around 1300 deaths annually.

== History ==
Timeline of Skopje
Historical affiliations

Dardanian Kingdom, 230–28 BC
Roman Empire, 28 BC–395
Byzantine Empire, 395–836
First Bulgarian Empire, 836–1004
Byzantine Empire, 1004–1093
Grand Principality of Serbia, 1093–1097
Byzantine Empire, 1098–1203
Second Bulgarian Empire, 1203–1246
Empire of Nicaea, 1246–1255
Second Bulgarian Empire, 1255–1256
Empire of Nicaea, 1256–1261
Byzantine Empire, 1261–1282
Kingdom of Serbia, 1282–1346
Serbian Empire, 1346–1371
District of Branković, 1371–1392
Ottoman Empire, 1392–1912
Kingdom of Serbia 1912–1915
Tsardom of Bulgaria 1915–1918
Kingdom of Yugoslavia (Note: Officially known as the Kingdom of Serbs, Croats and Slovenes until 1929) 1918–1941
Tsardom of Bulgaria 1941–1944
Democratic Federal Yugoslavia (Democratic Federal Macedonia) 1944–1946
Socialist Federal Republic of Yugoslavia (Socialist Republic of Macedonia) 1946–1992
North Macedonia (Note: See Macedonia naming dispute) 1992–present

=== Origins ===
The rocky promontory on which Skopje Fortress stands was the first site to be settled in Skopje. The earliest vestiges of human inhabitance found on this site date from the Chalcolithic (4th millennium BC).

Although the Chalcolithic settlement must have been of some significance, it declined during the Bronze Age. Archaeological research suggests that the settlement always belonged to the same culture, which progressively evolved due to contacts with Balkan and Danube cultures, and later with the Aegean. The locality eventually disappeared during the Iron Age when Scupi emerged on Zajčev Rid hill, some 5 km (3.1 mi) west of the fortress promontory. At the centre of the Balkan peninsula and on the road between the Danube and Aegean Sea, it was a prosperous locality, although its history is not well known.

During the Iron Age, the area of Skopje was inhabited by the Dardani. Illyrian tribes lived in most of the area west of Skopje and Thracian groups (Maedi) to the east, whilst Paeonians lived to the south of Skopje. The Dardanians had remained independent after the Roman conquest of Macedon, and it seems most likely that Dardania lost its independence in 28 BC.

=== Roman Scupi ===
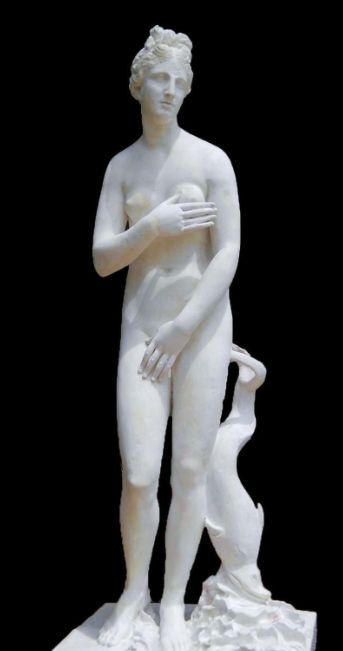
A "Venus Pudica" found in Scupi, dated from the 2nd century AD

Roman expansion east brought Scupi under Roman rule as a colony of legionaries, mainly veterans of the Legio VII Claudia during the reign of Emperor Domitian (AD 81–96). However, several legions from the Roman province of Macedonia of Crassus' army may already have been stationed there around 29–28 BC before the official imperial command was instituted. The first mention of the city was made at that period by Livy, who died in AD 17. Scupi first served as a military base to maintain peace in the region and was officially named "Colonia Flavia Scupinorum", Flavia being the name of the emperor's dynasty. Shortly afterwards it became part of the province of Moesia during Augustus's rule. After the division of the province by Domitian in AD 86, Scupi was elevated to colonial status and became a seat of government within the new province of Moesia Superior. The district called Dardania (within Moesia Superior) was formed into a special province by Emperor Diocletian, with the capital at Naissus.

The city's population was very diverse. Engravings on tombstones suggest that only a minority of the population came from Italia, whilst many veterans were from Dalmatia, southern Gaul and Syria. Because of the ethnic diversity of the population, Latin maintained itself as the main language in the city at the expense of Greek, which was spoken in most of the Moesian and Macedonian cities. During the following centuries, Scupi experienced prosperity. The period from the end of the 3rd century to the end of the 4th century was particularly flourishing. The first church was founded under the reign of Emperor Constantine the Great and Scupi became the seat of a diocese. In 395, following the division of the Roman Empire into two, Scupi became part of the Eastern Roman Empire.

An ancient funeral inscription of the Illyrian tribe Albanoi was found in Scupi. And another inscription was found that reads Dardanus.

In its zenith, Scupi covered 40 hectares and was closed by a 3.5 m (11 ft) wide wall. It had many monuments, including four necropoles, a theatre, thermae, and a large Christian basilica.

=== Middle Ages ===
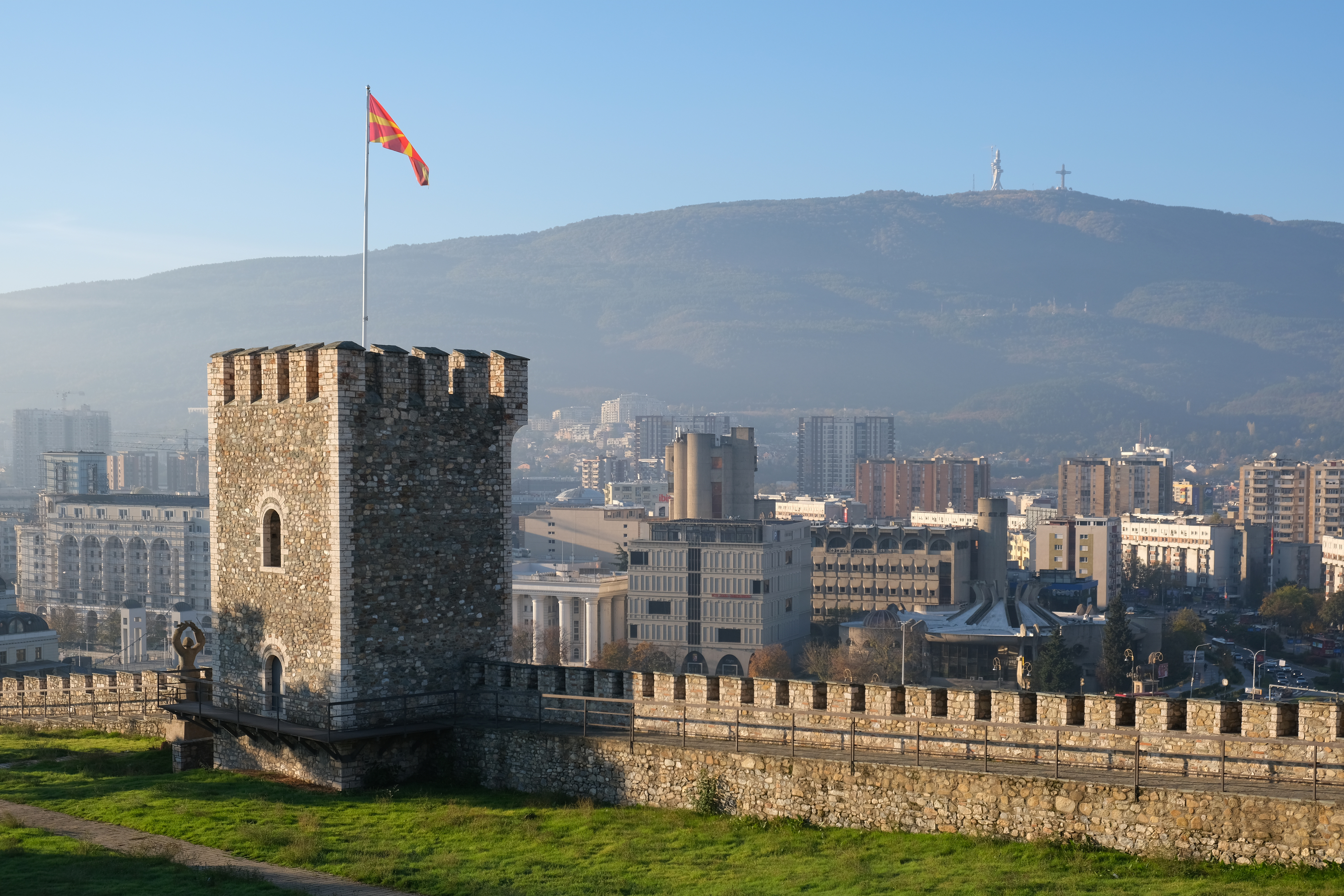
Skopje Fortress

In 518, Scupi was destroyed by a violent earthquake, possibly the most devastating the town had ever experienced. At that time, the region was threatened by Barbarian invasions, and the city inhabitants had already fled to the forests and mountains before the disaster occurred. The city was eventually rebuilt by Justinian I. During his reign, many Byzantine towns were relocated on hills and other easily defendable places to face invasions. It was thus transferred to another site: the promontory on which Skopje Fortress stands. Despite this, Scupi was sacked by Slavs at the end of the 6th century and the city seems to have fallen under Slavic rule in 595. The Slavic tribe which sacked Scupi was probably the Berziti, who had invaded the entire Vardar Valley. However, the Slavs did not settle permanently in the region, which had been already plundered and depopulated, but continued south to the Mediterranean coast. After the Slavic invasion it was deserted for some time and is not mentioned during the following centuries. It is possible that in the late 7th or the early 8th century the Byzantines again settled at this strategic location. Along with the rest of the Upper Vardar valley it became part of the expanding Bulgarian Empire in the 830s.

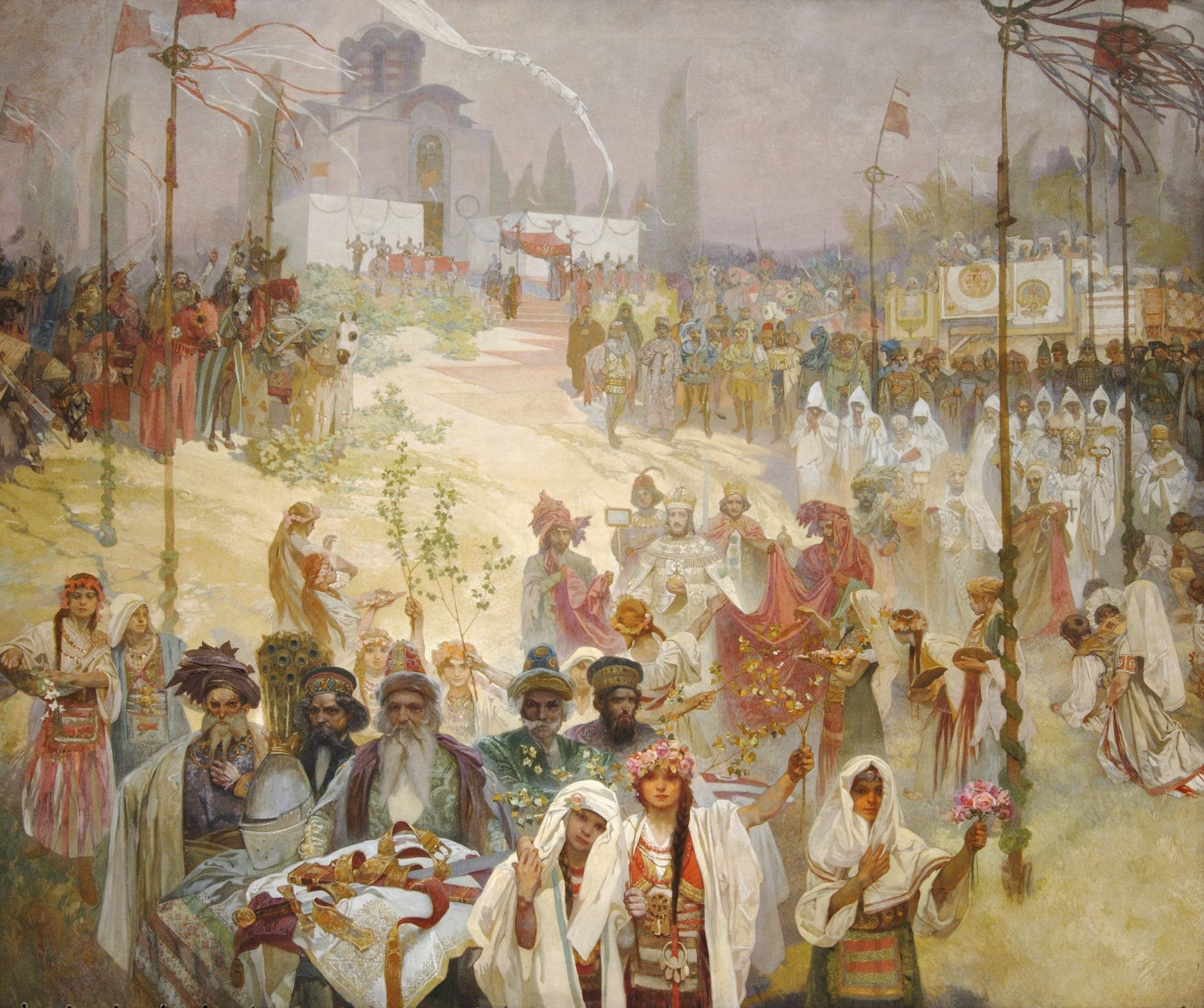
The coronation of Emperor Stefan Dušan in Skopje (Note: By Alfons Mucha, 1926)

Starting from the end of the 10th century Skopje experienced a period of wars and political troubles. It served as the Bulgarian capital from 972 to 992, and Tsar Samuel ruled it from 976 until 1004, when its governor surrendered it to Byzantine Emperor Basil the Bulgar Slayer in 1004 in exchange for the titles of patrikios and strategos. It became a centre of a new Byzantine province called Bulgaria. Later Skopje was briefly seized twice by Slavic insurgents who wanted to restore the Bulgarian state, at first in 1040 under Peter Delyan's command, and in 1072 under the orders of Georgi Voyteh. In 1081, Skopje was captured by Norman troops led by Robert Guiscard and the city remained in their hands until 1088. Skopje was subsequently conquered by the Serbian Grand Prince Vukan in 1093, and again by the Normans four years later. However, because of epidemics and food shortage, Normans quickly surrendered to the Byzantines.

During the 12th and 13th centuries, Bulgarians and Serbs took advantage of Byzantine decline to create large kingdoms stretching from the Danube to the Aegean Sea. Kaloyan brought Skopje back into the re-established Second Bulgarian Empire in 1203 until his nephew Strez declared autonomy along the Upper Vardar with Serbian aid only five years later. In 1209, Strez switched allegiances and recognised Boril of Bulgaria with whom he led a successful joint campaign against Serbia's first internationally recognised King Stefan Nemanjić. From 1214 to 1230, Skopje was a part of the Byzantine successor state of Epirus before being recaptured by Ivan Asen II and held by Bulgaria until 1246 when the Upper Vardar valley was incorporated once more into another Byzantine rump state – the Empire of Nicaea. Byzantine conquest was briefly reversed in 1255 by the regents of the young Michael Asen I of Bulgaria. Meanwhile, in the parallel civil war for the Crown in Tarnovo, the Skopje boyar and grandson of Stefan Nemanja, Constantine Tikh gained the upper hand and ruled until the Uprising of Ivaylo, Europe's only successful peasant revolt, led to his deposition from power.

In 1282, Skopje was captured by Serbian King Stefan Milutin. Under the political stability of the Nemanjić rule, the settlement spread outside the walls of the fortress, towards Gazi Baba hill. Churches, monasteries and markets were built and tradesmen from the Republic of Venice and Dubrovnik opened shops. The town greatly benefited from its location near European, Middle Eastern, and African markets. In the 14th century, Skopje became such an important city that King Stefan Dušan made it the capital of the Serbian Empire. In 1346, he was crowned as Emperor of the Serbs and Greeks in Skopje. After his death the Serbian Empire collapsed into several principalities which were unable to defend themselves against the Ottoman Turks. Skopje was first inherited by the Lordship of Prilep and finally taken by Vuk Branković in the wake of the Battle of Maritsa (1371) before becoming part of the Ottoman Empire in 1392.

In 1330, Serbian King Stefan Dečanski mentioned Albanians as being in the district of Skopje and regularly going to the Fair of Saint George which convened near the city.

=== Ottoman period ===
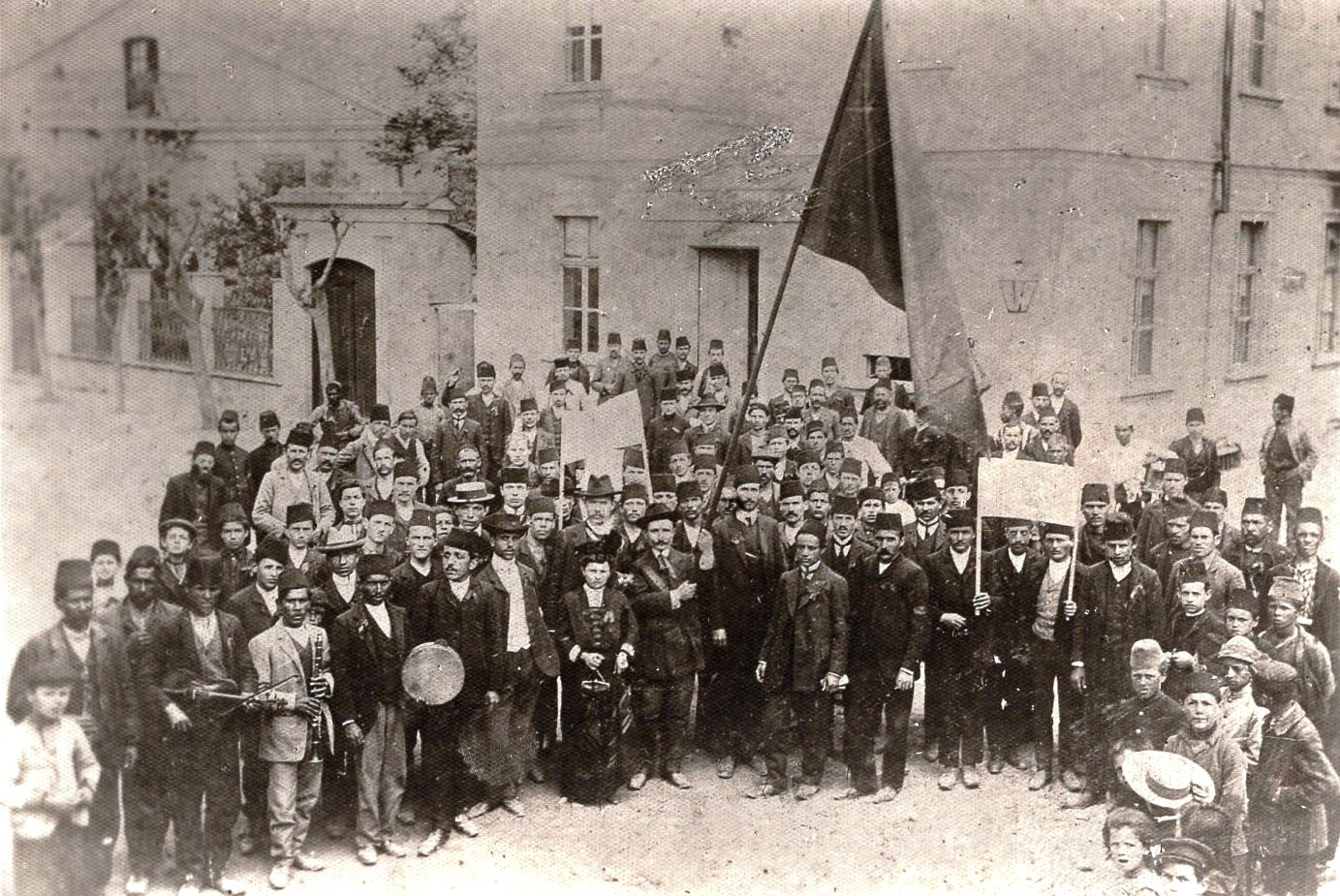
First May Day celebration of the Ottoman period in Skopje, 1909

The Ottomans stayed in Skopje for over 520 years and the city's economic life greatly benefited from its position in the middle of Rumelia, the European province of the Ottomans. The Stone Bridge, "one of the most imposing stone bridges to be found in Yugoslavia", was built under the patronage of Sultan Mehmed II the Conqueror between 1451 and 1469. The Ottomans drastically changed the appearance of the city. They organised the Old Bazaar, with its caravanserais, mosques and baths.

In the cadastral register of 1451–52, the Skopje neighbourhood Gjin-ko (Gjinaj), is mentioned, being named after the medieval Albanian Gjini family. The neighbourhood displayed mixed Christian Albanian anthroponymy with cases of Slavicisation present (e.g. Palić; Pal + Slavic suffix ić). During this time period, a number of timariots of the city are recorded as bearing the name Arnauti (meaning Albanian) alongside a Muslim name, i.e. Hamza Arnauti, Shahin Arnauti, Jusuf Arnauti. Another group bore Slavic Christian names, whilst also bearing the surname Arbanas/Arnaut, i.e. Bogdan Arbanas, Bogoslav Arbanas, Milosh Arbanas, Bozhidar Arnaut, etc. These individuals are noted as not having the Slavic appellatives došlac, prišlac or uselica, which were given by Ottoman authorities to new settlers of a given region, likely indicating they were locals. In the year 1451 or 1453 a neighbourhood was registered bearing an Aromanian name, Mahalle-i Todor Vlaja-Vlaha. Amongst the 45 family heads of this neighbourhood, Christian Slavic and Albanian anthroponyms were recorded (Gjon-çe, son of Noriç, Koljko Bibani, Tusho, son of Rada, etc.), whilst a sizeable number of individuals bearing mixed Slavic-Vlach anthroponyms are also registered, such as: Petko, son of Vllah (Iflak), Petru, son of David, Andreja, kozhuhar, Nikul Çikun, etc.

In the mahallah Ahrijan Hasan in the year 1451 or 1453, a head of the family from the noble Albanian Muzaka family, who had converted to Islam, was re-registered amongst the Muslim heads of the family. In the other register of 1467/68, now in the Christian mahallah named Svetko Samarxhi, amongst the 29 heads of families with Slavic Christian anthroponyms, a number also carried Albanian anthroponyms. In the neighbourhood of Jazixhi Shahin, amongst the residents with Muslim names, the head of the family was registered only with the surname Zenebishi, without mentioning his social position or his profession, indicating a higher social status. This may suggest a relation to Hasan Bey Zenebishi, a descendant of the Zenebishi family and the Soubashi of the Nahiyah of Kalkandelen. Individuals bearing Albanian anthroponyms, be they in conjunction with Islamic, Slavic or Christian ones, also appear in the neighbourhoods of Kasim Fakih, Dursun Saraç, Kujumxhi Mentesheli, Çerep, Jandro, Stanimir, Vllah Dançu and Rela. A number of Sipahis were also of Albanian origin, with these individuals holding timars in areas which had a Christian Albanian symbiosis with Slavic anthroponyms in the vicinity of Skopje. The defters noted that these were old sipahis, likely having been landowners. These individual Sipahis were closely related by descent and blood, and taking account kinship ties, even though they had heterogeneous, Christian, Slavic and Oriental names, they appear to have been Albanians. Some have names indicating their origin, such as Shimerd Vardarli from Skopje, making it likely these timariotes were locals.

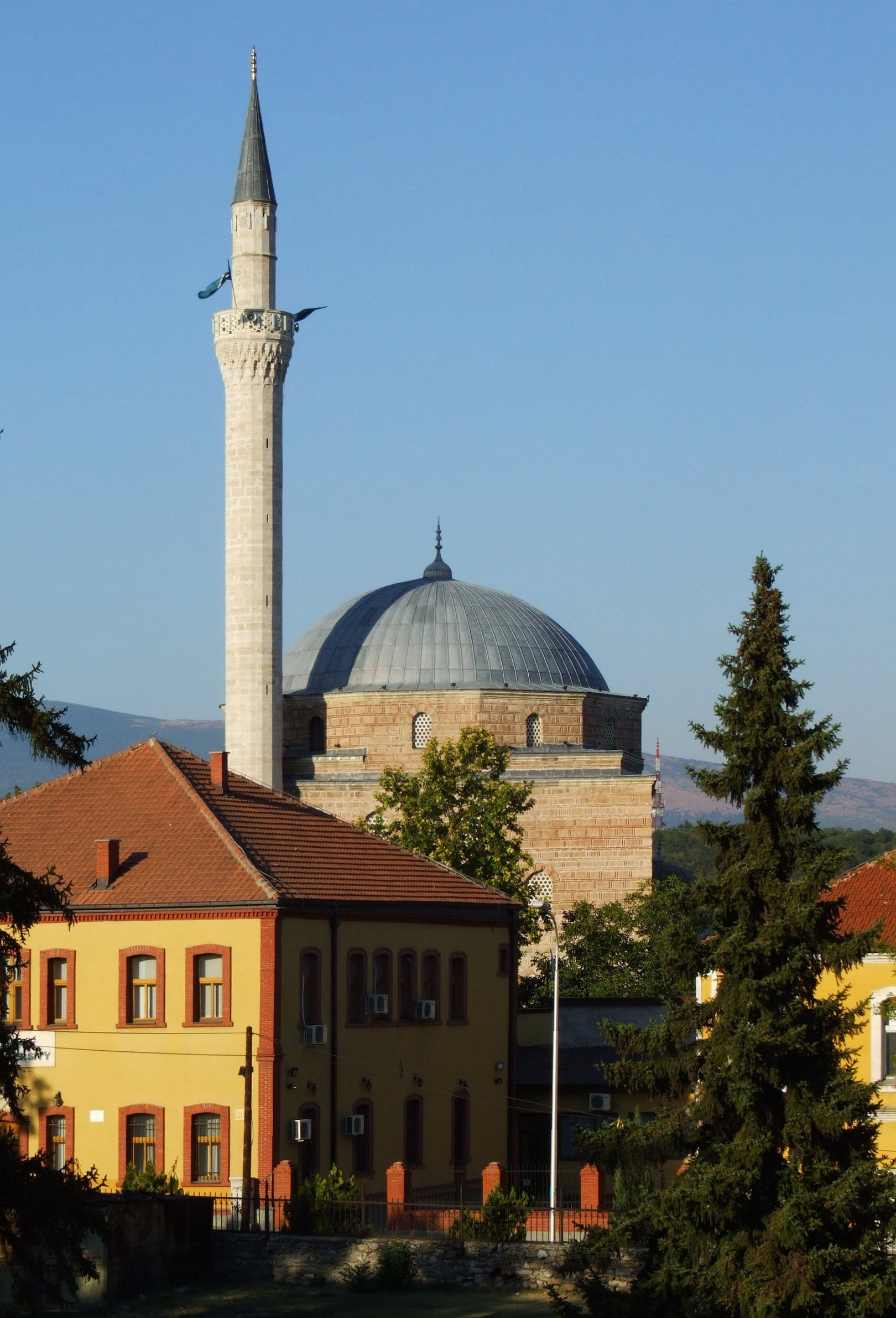
The 15th-century Mustafa Pasha Mosque

In the 1467/68 and 1568/69 defter, Skopje had a majority Muslim population. The 1467/68 defter recorded 33 Muslim town quarters with 637 houses whereas the Christians had 11 quarters with 277 houses. In 1568/69 there were 57 Muslim quarters and only 9 Christian.

Around 1529, the Christians of Skopje were mostly non-converted Slavs and Albanians, but also Ragusan and Armenian tradesmen. Mustafa Pasha Mosque, built in 1492, is reputed to be "one of the most resplendent sacral Islamic buildings in the Balkans." In 1535 all churches were demolished by decree of the Ottoman governor. In 1555, the city was hit by another severe earthquake, collapsing much of the city. The Old Bazaar of Skopje, the columns of the Stone Bridge, and the murals in the upper parts of the Church of St. Panteleimon, Gorno Nerezi were all severely damaged. Some modern sources estimate this earthquake to have been a Category XII (Extreme) on the Modified Mercalli intensity scale, although others believe this is an overestimate.

In 1623–1624, Pjeter Mazreku, a Roman Catholic prelate, reported the town was inhabited by "Turks (Muslims), the majority of them being Albanians, the rest are of Asiatic origin", Mazreku further wrote, "there are also Jews, Serbs and some Greeks in the town". In the Ottoman period, Turks was used by Christian sources as a term for all Muslims, regardless of ethnic background. Sources from the years of 1689–1690 considered the town of Shkupi (Skopje) during those periods as part of Albania.

Until the 17th century, Skopje experienced a long golden age. Around 1650, the number of inhabitants in Skopje was between 30,000 and 60,000, and the city contained more than 10,000 houses. It was then one of the only big cities on the territory of future Yugoslavia, together with Belgrade and Sarajevo. At that time, Dubrovnik, which was a busy harbour, did not even have 7,000 inhabitants. The city severely suffered from the Great Turkish War at the end of the 17th century and consequently experienced recession until the 19th century. In 1689, the Habsburgs seized Skopje which was already weakened by a cholera epidemic. The same day, general Silvio Piccolomini began the Skopje fire of 1689, attempting to end the epidemic. It is however possible that he wanted to avenge damages that the Ottomans caused in the Battle of Vienna in 1683. Skopje burned for two days but the general himself perished of the plague and his leaderless army was routed. The Austrian presence in Macedonia motivated Slav uprisings. Nevertheless, the Austrians left the country within the year and the Hajduks, the leaders of the uprisings, had to follow them in their retreat north of the Balkans. Some were arrested by the Ottomans, such as Petar Karposh, who was impaled on Skopje's Stone Bridge.

After the war, Skopje was in ruins. Most of the official buildings were restored or rebuilt, but the city experienced new plague and cholera epidemics and many inhabitants emigrated. Ottoman Empire as a whole entered into recession and political decline. Many rebellions and pillages occurred in Macedonia during the 18th century, either led by Ottoman outlaws, Janissaries or Hajduks. An estimation conducted by French officers around 1836 revealed that at that time Skopje only had around 10,000 inhabitants. It was surpassed by two other towns of present-day North Macedonia: Bitola (40,000) and Štip (15–20,000).

Skopje began to recover from decades of decline after 1850. At that time, the city experienced a slow but steady demographic growth, mainly due to the rural exodus of Slavic Macedonians. It was also fuelled by the exodus of Muslims from the Principalities of Serbia and Bulgaria, which were gaining autonomy and independence from the Empire at that time. During the Tanzimat reforms, nationalism arose in the Ottoman Empire and in 1870 a new Bulgarian Exarchate was established and its separate diocese was created, based on ethnic identity, rather than religious principles. The Slavic population of the bishopric of Skopje voted in 1874 overwhelmingly, by 91% in favour of joining the Exarchate and became part of the Bulgarian Millet. Economic growth was permitted by the construction of the Skopje-Salonica railway in 1873. The railway station was built south of the Vardar and this contributed to the relocation of economic activities on that side of the river, which had never been urbanised before. Because of the rural exodus, the share of Christians in the city population increased. Some of the newcomers became part of the local elite and helped to spread nationalist ideas. In 1877, Skopje was chosen as the capital city of the new Kosovo Vilayet, which encompassed present-day Kosovo, north-western Macedonia and the Sanjak of Novi Pazar.

In statistics gathered by Bulgarian ethnographer Vasil Kanchov in 1900, the City of Skopje was inhabited by 31,900 people, of whom 15,000 were Turks, 13,000 Christian Bulgarians, 1,920 Romani, 800 Jews, 450 Vlachs, 150 Christian Albanians, 50 Christian Greeks, 30 Circassians and 500 inhabitants of various other ethnicities. Kanchov wrote in the same year that many Albanians declared themselves as Turks. In Skopje, the population that declared itself Turkish "was of Albanian blood", but it "had been Turkified after the Ottoman invasion, including Skanderbeg", referring to Islamisation. Bulgarian literary historian Yordan Ivanov wrote in 1915 that Albanians, since they did not have their own alphabet, due to a lack of consolidated national consciousness and influenced by foreign propaganda, declared themselves as Turks, Greeks and Bulgarians, depending on which religion they belonged to. Albanians were losing their mother tongue in Skopje. German linguist Gustav Weigand described that Skopje's Muslim population of "Turks" or "Ottomans" during the late Ottoman period were mainly Albanians who spoke Turkish in public and Albanian at home. In 1905, the city had 32,000 inhabitants, making it the largest of the vilayet, although closely followed by Prizren with its 30,000 inhabitants. At the beginning of the 20th century, local economy was focused on dyeing, weaving, tanning, ironworks and wine and flour processing.

Skopje was one of the five main centres of the Internal Macedonian Revolutionary Organisation when it organised the 1903 Ilinden uprising. Its revolutionary network in the region led by Nikola Pushkarov was not well-developed and the lack of weapons was a serious problem. At the outbreak of the uprising, the rebel forces derailed a military train. On 3 and 5 August respectively, they attacked an Ottoman unit guarding the bridge on the Vardar River and fought a battle in the St. Jovan monastery. In the next few days, the band was pursued by numerous Bashibozuks and moved to Bulgaria.

Following the Young Turk Revolution in 1908, the Ottoman Empire experienced democracy and several political parties were created. However, some of the policies implemented by the Young Turks, such as a tax rise and the interdiction of ethnic-based political parties, discontented minorities. Albanians opposed the nationalist character of the movement and led local uprisings in 1910 and 1912. During the latter, they managed to seize most of Kosovo and took Skopje on 11 August. On 18 August, the insurgents signed the Üsküb agreement which provided for the creation of an autonomous Albanian province, and they were amnestied the day later.

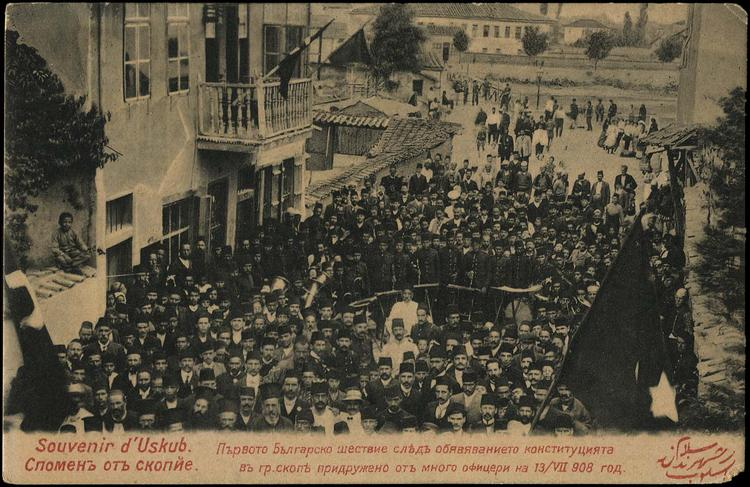
Bulgarian manifestation in support of the Young Turk Revolution

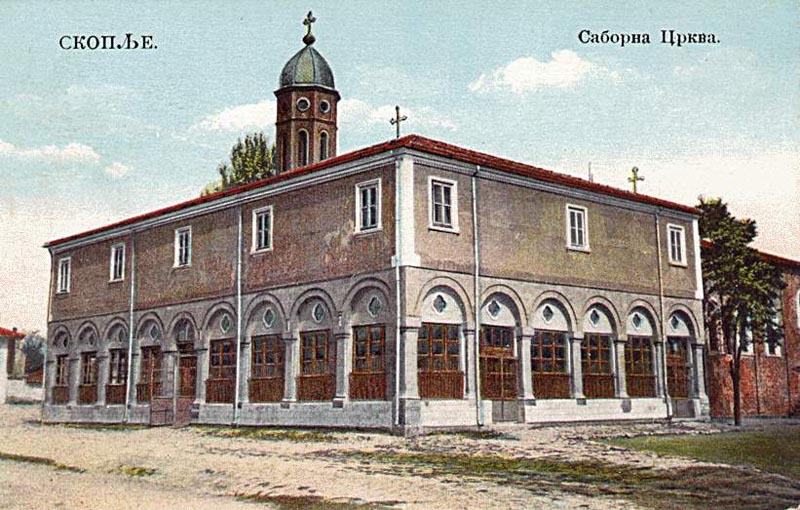
The Church of the Nativity of the Theotokos, seat of the Bulgarian Orthodox Diocese of Skopje, built in the 19th century

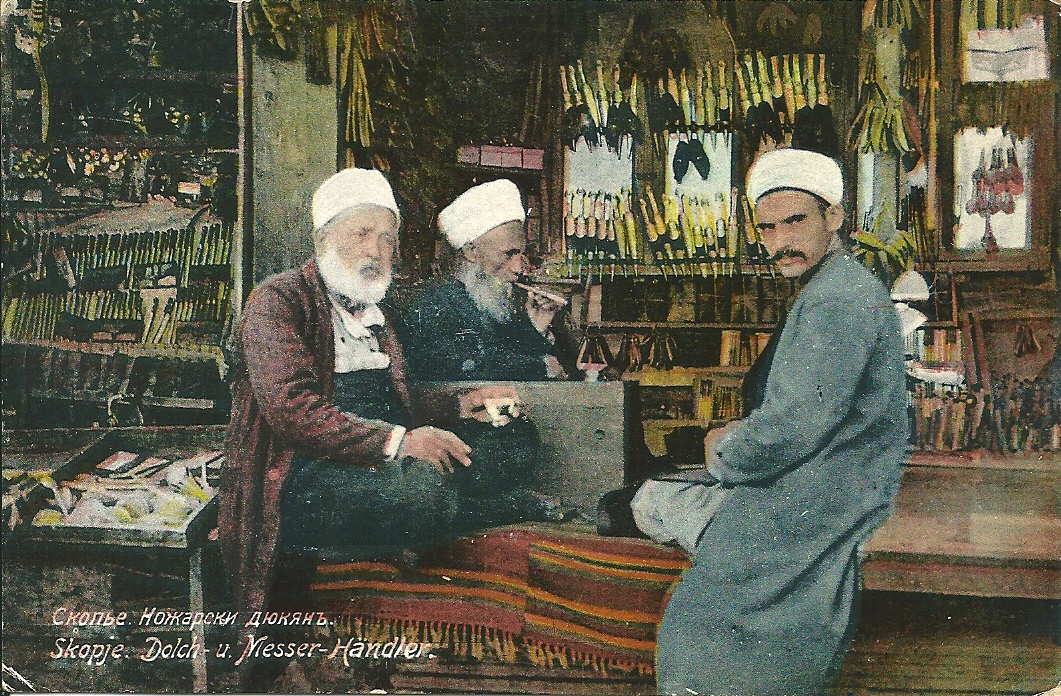
Cutlers in the Old Bazaar around 1900

=== Balkan Wars to present day ===
Skopje after being captured by Albanian revolutionaries in August 1912 after defeating the Ottoman forces holding the city, later the Ottomans restored power over the city

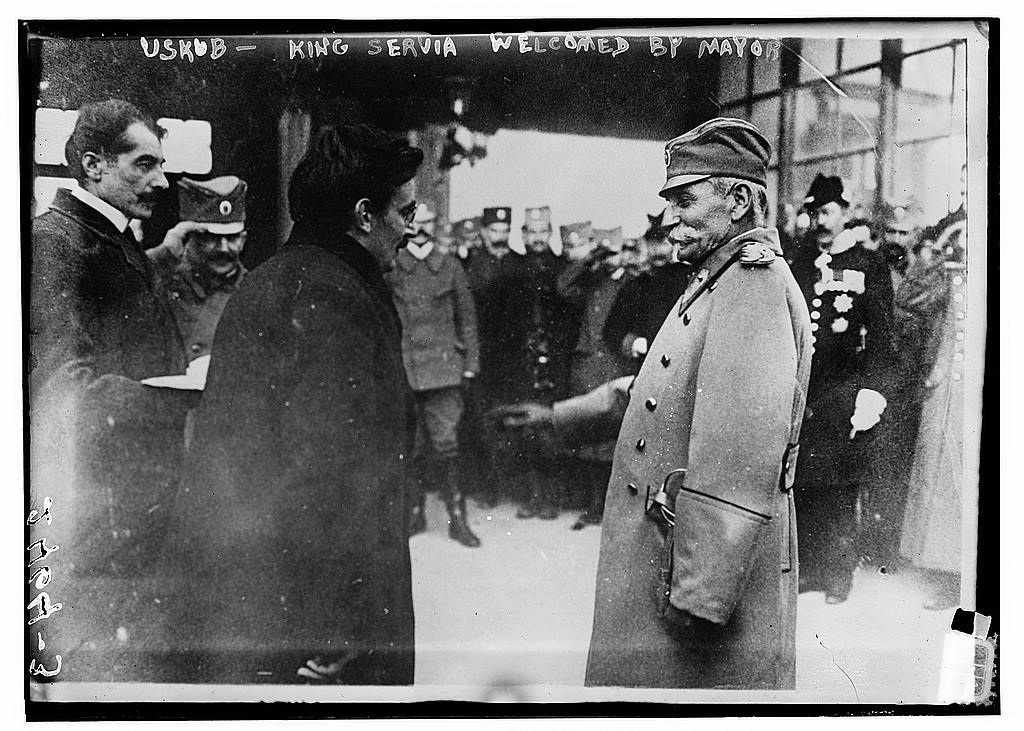
Peter I of Serbia visiting Skopje in 1914

Following an alliance contracted in 1912, Bulgaria, Greece and Serbia declared war on the Ottoman Empire. Their goal was to definitively expel the Ottomans from Europe. The First Balkan War started on 8 October 1912 and lasted six weeks. Serbians reached Skopje on 26 October. Ottoman forces had left the city the day before. During the conflict, the Chetniks, a Serb irregular force, razed the Albanian quarter of Skopje and killed numerous Albanian inhabitants from the city. The Serbian annexation led to the exodus of 725 Muslim families which left the city on 27 January 1913. The same year, the city population was evaluated at 37,000 by the Serbian authorities.

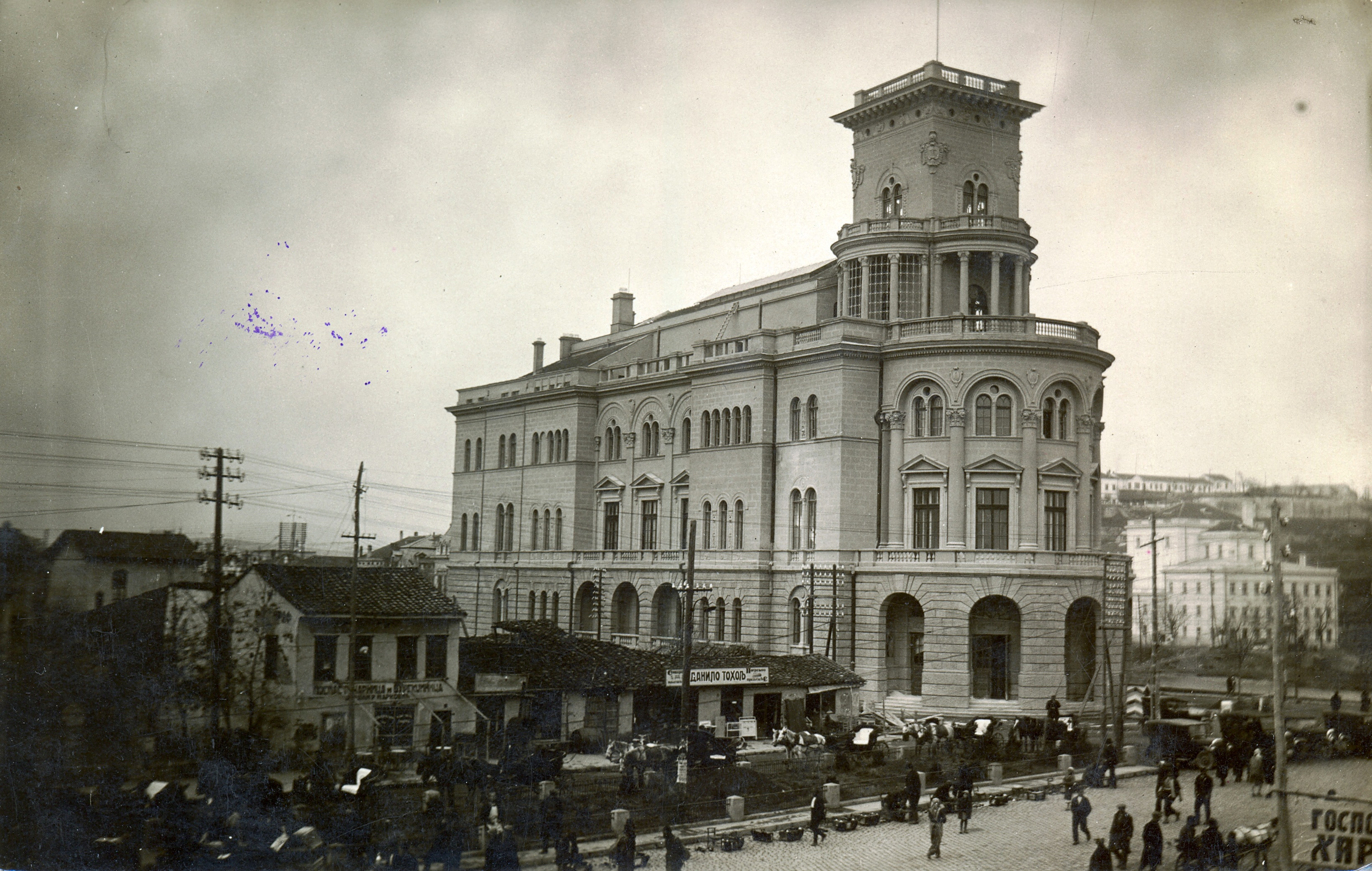
A view of the centre of Skopje in the 1930s

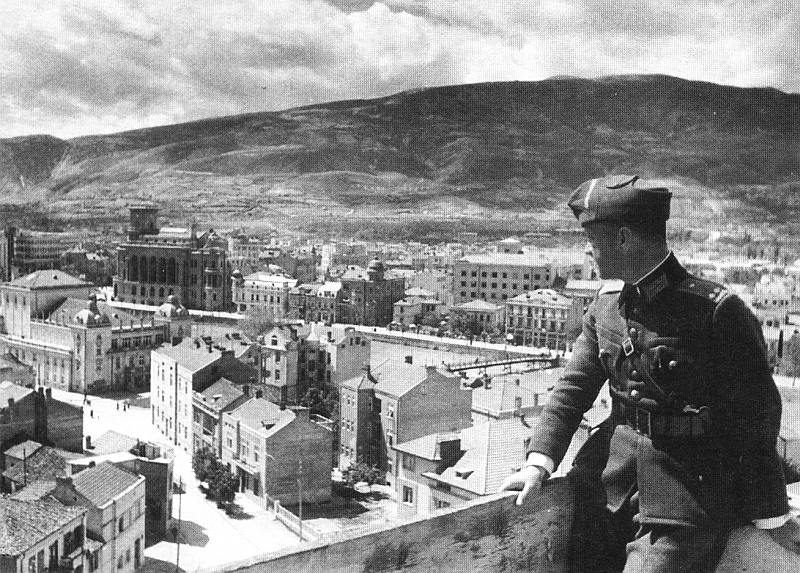
A Bulgarian officer looking at Skopje's centre, April 1941

In 1915, during the First World War, Eastern and South Serbia were invaded by Bulgaria, which captured Skopje on 22 October 1915. Serbia, allied to the Triple Entente, was helped by France, Britain, Greece, and Italy, which formed the Macedonian front. Following a great Allied offensive in 1918, the Armée française d'Orient reached Skopje on 29 September and took the city by surprise. After the end of the World War, Vardar Macedonia became part of the new Kingdom of Serbs, Croats, and Slovenes, which became "Kingdom of Yugoslavia" in 1929. A mostly foreign ethnic Serb ruling class gained control, imposing large-scale repression. The policies of de-Bulgarisation and assimilation were pursued. At that time part of the young locals, repressed by the Serbs, tried to find a separate way of ethnic Macedonian development. In 1931, in a move to formally decentralise the country, Skopje was named the capital of the Vardar Banovina of the Kingdom of Yugoslavia. Until the Second World War, Skopje experienced strong economic growth, and its population increased. The city had 41,066 inhabitants in 1921, 64,807 in 1931, and 80,000 in 1941. Although in an underdeveloped region, it attracted wealthy Serbs who opened businesses and contributed to the modernisation of the city. In 1941, Skopje had 45 factories.

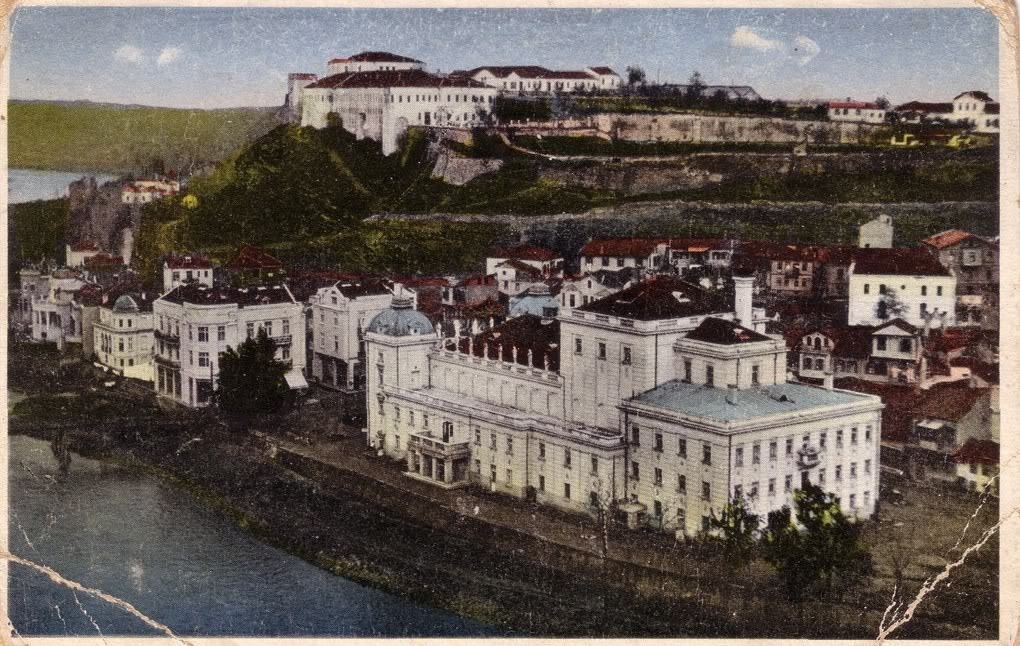
The national theatre and the fortress around 1920

In 1941, during the Second World War, Yugoslavia was invaded by Nazi Germany. Germans seized Skopje on 8 April and left it to their Bulgarian allies on 22 April 1941. To ensure the Bulgarisation of the society, authorities closed Serbian schools and churches, opening new schools and a higher education institute, the King Boris University. The 4,000 Jews of Skopje were all deported in 1943 to the Treblinka extermination camp where almost all of them were killed.

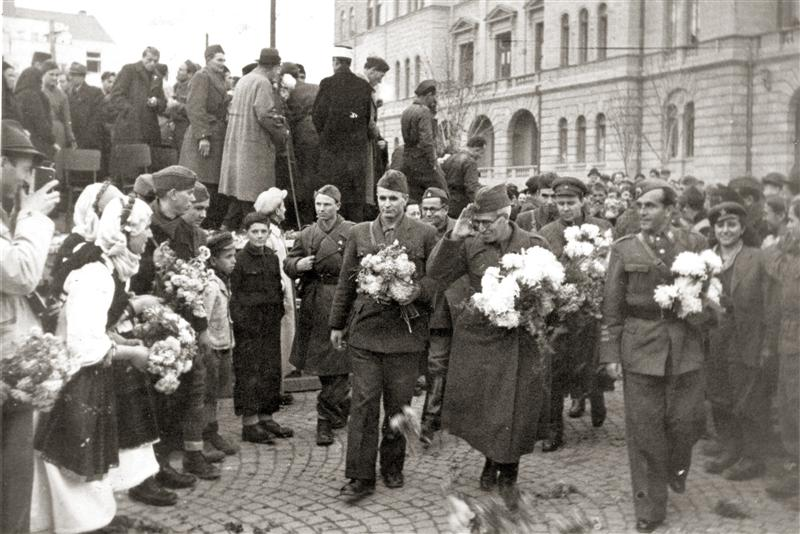
Čento, Dimitar Vlahov and Mihajlo Apostolski parading in liberated Skopje, November 1944

Skopje was captured on 13 November 1944 by units of the Bulgarian People's Army (Bulgaria having switched sides in the war in September) aided by Yugoslav Partisans of the Macedonian National Liberation Army. Skopje became the capital city of the newly proclaimed Democratic Federal Macedonia as set up by the ASNOM on 2 August 1944 in the Bulgarian occupation zone in Yugoslavia.

After World War II, Skopje greatly benefited from Socialist Yugoslav policies which encouraged industry and the development of Macedonian cultural institutions. Consequently, Skopje became home to a national library, a philharmonic orchestra, a university, and the Macedonian Academy of Sciences and Arts. However, its post-war development was altered by the 1963 earthquake which occurred on 26 July. Although relatively weak in magnitude, it caused enormous damage in the city and can be compared to the 1960 Agadir earthquake. The disaster killed 1,070 people, injuring 3,300 others. 16,000 people were buried alive in ruins and 70% of the population lost their home. Many educational facilities, factories and historical buildings were destroyed.

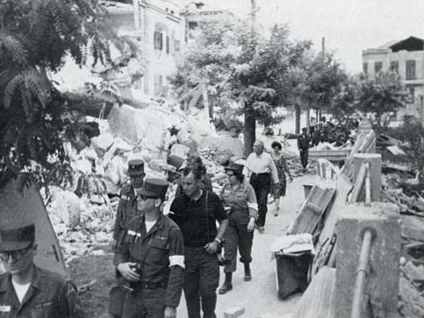
American soldiers in Skopje after the 1963 earthquake

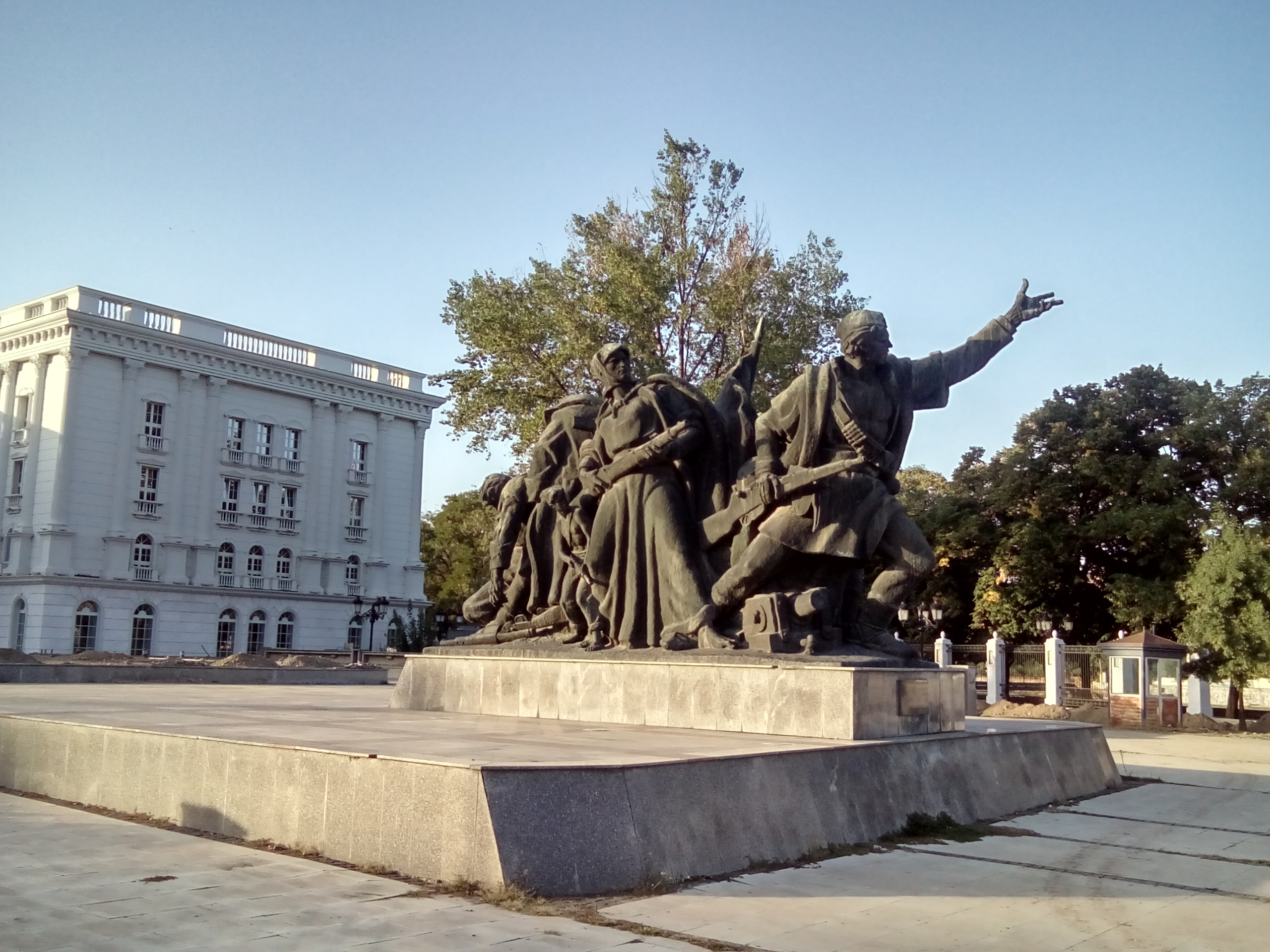
Monument to the Macedonian partisans – Liberators of Skopje, next to the Government building

After the earthquake, reconstruction was quick. It had a deep psychological impact on the population because neighbourhoods were split, and people were relocated to new houses and buildings they were not familiar with. Many Albanians, some from Kosovo participated in the reconstruction effort. Reconstruction was finished by 1980, even if many elements were never built because funds were exhausted. Skopje's cityscape was drastically changed, and the city became a true example of modernist architecture. Demographic growth was very important after 1963, and Skopje had 408,100 inhabitants in 1981. After 1963, rural youth migrated to Skopje and were involved in the reconstruction process resulting in a large growth of the urban Macedonian population. The Albanian population of Skopje also increased as people from the northern villages migrated to the city and others came from Kosovo either to provide manpower for reconstruction or fled the deteriorating political situation, especially during the 1990s. However, during the 1980s and the 1990s, the country experienced inflation and recession, and the local economy heavily suffered. The situation improved during the 2000s thanks to new investments. Many landmarks were restored and the "Skopje 2014" project renewed the appearance of the city centre.

== Emblems ==
The Flag of Skopje is a red banner in proportions 1:2 with a gold-coloured coat of arms of the city positioned in the upper-left corner. It is either vertical or horizontal, but the vertical version was the first to be used.

The coat of arms of the city was adopted in the 1950s. It depicts the Stone Bridge with the Vardar river, the Kale Fortress and the snow-capped peaks of the Šar mountains.

== Administration ==
=== Status ===
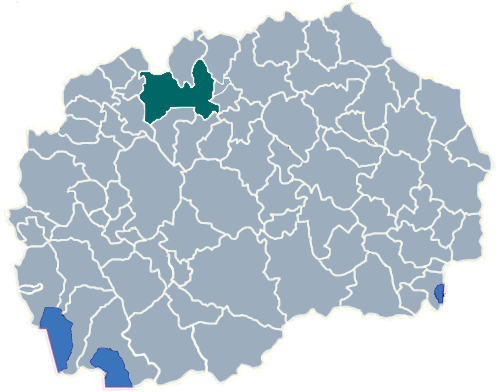
Greater Skopje amongst the municipalities of North Macedonia

Official extent of the settlement of Skopje (the city proper) within the administrative unit of the City of Skopje.

Being the capital and largest city of North Macedonia, Skopje enjoys a particular status granted by law. The last revision of its status was made in 2004. Since then, the City of Skopje has been divided into 10 municipalities which all have a council and a mayor, like all of the country's municipalities. Municipalities only deal with matters specific of their territory, and the City of Skopje deals with matters that concern all of them, or that cannot be divided between two or more municipalities.

The City of Skopje is part of the Skopje Statistical Region, which has no political or administrative power.

=== City Council ===
The City Council consists of 45 members who serve a four-year term. It primarily deals with budget, global orientations and relations between the city and the government. Several commissions exist to treat more specific topics, such as urbanism, finances, environment or local development. The President of the council is elected by the Council Members. Since 2021 the president has been Trajko Slaveski, member of VMRO-DPMNE.

Following the 2021 local elections, the City Council is constituted as follows:

Party / List	Seats
SDSM	12
VMRO-DPMNE	18
DUI	5
AA/A	2
DOM	2
Levica	4
Total	45

=== Mayor ===
The Mayor of Skopje is elected every four years. The mayor represents the City of Skopje and can submit ideas to the council, manages the administrative bodies and their officials.

=== Municipalities ===
Skopje was first divided into administrative units in 1945, but the first municipalities were created in 1976. There were five municipalities: Centar, Čair, Karpoš, Gazi Baba and Kisela Voda. After the 1991 independence of the country, power was centralised and municipalities lost much of their competences. A 1996 law restored them and created two new municipalities: Ǵorče Petrov and Šuto Orizari. After the insurgency between Albanian rebels and Macedonian forces in 2001, a new law was enacted in 2004 to incorporate the Saraj Municipality into the City of Skopje. Saraj is mostly populated by Albanians and, since then, Albanians represent more than 20% of the city population. Thus, Albanian became the second official language of the city administration, something which was one of the claims of the Albanian rebels. The same year, Aerodrom Municipality separated itself from Kisela Voda, and Butel Municipality from Čair.

Municipalities are administered by a council of 23 members elected every four years. They also have a mayor and several departments (education, culture, finances...). The mayor primarily deals with these departments.

Name	Size (km^{2})	Population 2002	Population 2021
Aerodrom	20	72,009	77,735
Butel	54.79	36,144	37,968
Centar	7.52	45,412	43,893
Čair	3.52	64,773	62,586
Gazi Baba	110.86	72,617	69,626
Ǵorče Petrov	66.93	41,634	44,844
Karpoš	35.21	59,666	63,760
Kisela Voda	34.24	57,236	61,965
Saraj	229.06	35,408	38,399
Šuto Orizari	7.48	22,017	25,726
City of Skopje	571.46	506,926	526,502

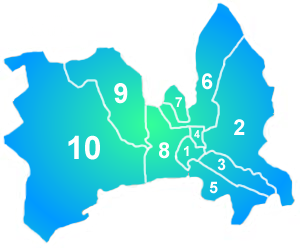

1. Centar (Центар)
2. Gazi Baba (Гази Баба)
3. Aerodrom (Аеродром)
4. Čair (Чаир)
5. Kisela Voda (Кисела Вода)
6. Butel (Бутел)
7. Šuto Orizari (Шуто Оризари)
8. Karpoš (Карпош)
9. Ǵorče Petrov (Ѓорче Петров)
10. Saraj (Сарај)

== Economy ==
=== Economic weight ===
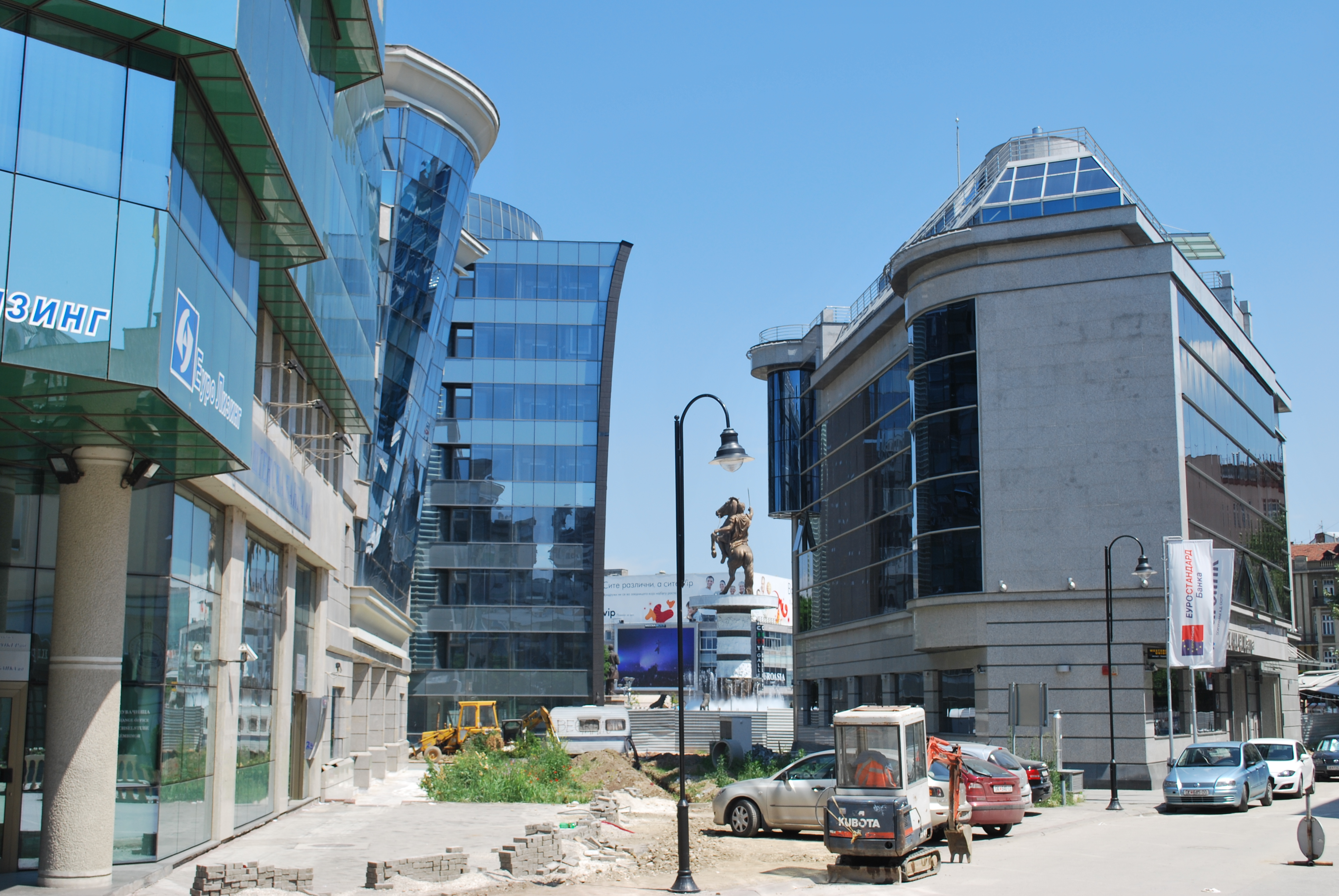
The small business district

Skopje is a medium city at the European level. Being the capital and largest city of North Macedonia, Skopje concentrates a large share of the national economy. The Skopje Statistical Region, which encompasses the City of Skopje and some neighbouring municipalities, produces 45.5% of the Macedonian GDP. In 2009, the regional GDP per capita amounted to US$6,565, or 155% of the Macedonian GDP per capita. This figure is, however, smaller than the one of neighbouring Sofia (US$10,106), Sarajevo (US$10,048) or Belgrade (US$7,983), but higher than the one of Tirana (US$4,126).

Because there are no other large cities in the country, and because of political and economic centralisation, a large number of Macedonians living outside of Skopje work in the capital city. The dynamism of the city also encourages rural exodus, not only from North Macedonia, but also from Kosovo, Albania and Southern Serbia.

=== Firms and activities ===
In 2009, Skopje had 26,056 firms but only 145 of them had a large size. The large majority of them are either small (12,017) or very small (13,625). A large share of the firms deal with trading of goods (9,758), 3,839 are specialised in business and real estate, and 2,849 are manufacturers. Although few in number, large firms account for 51% of the local production outside finance.

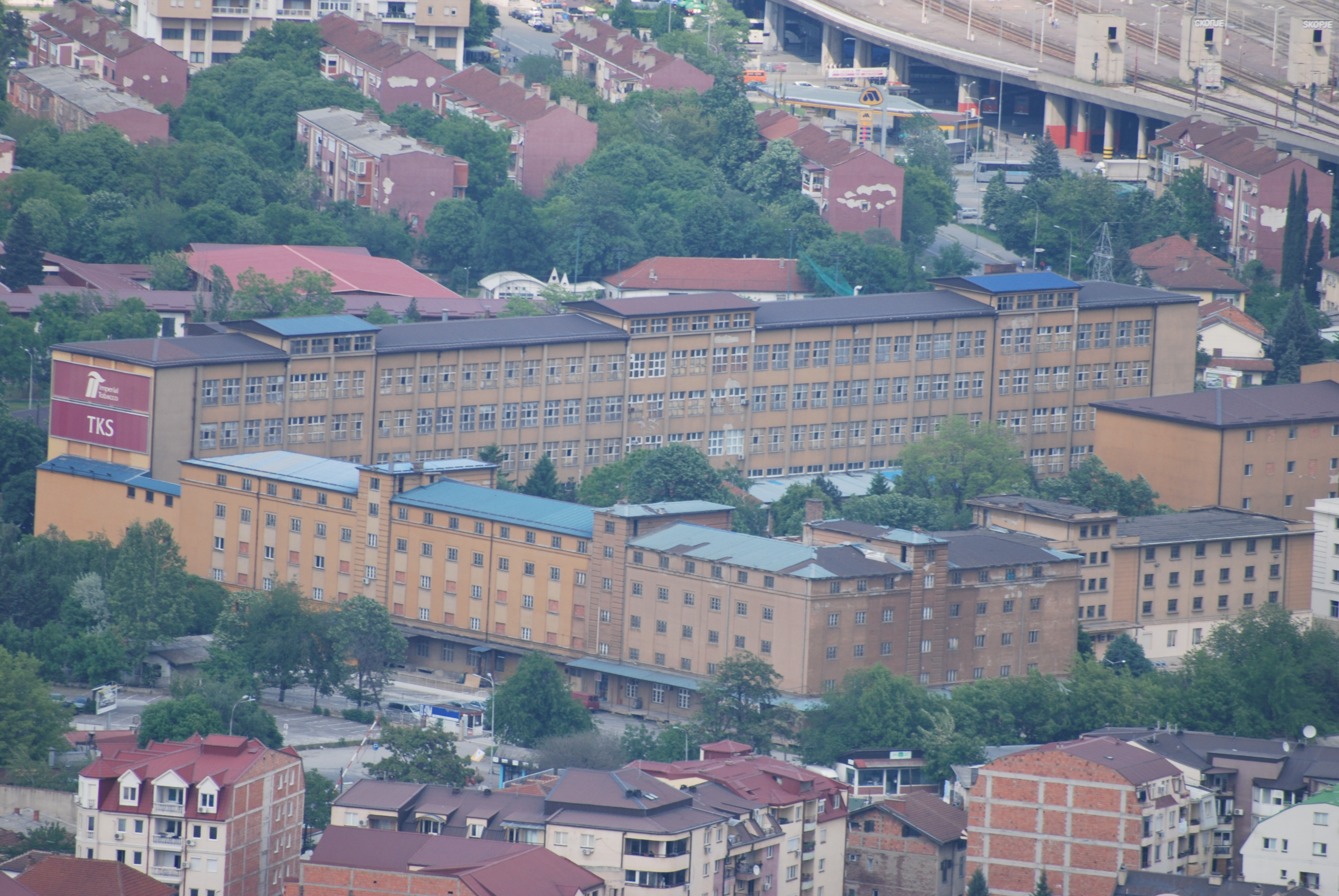
The Imperial Tobacco plant

The city industry is dominated by food processing, textile, printing and metal processing. In 2012, it accounted for 30% of the city's GDP. Most of the industrial areas are in Gazi Baba municipality, on the major routes and rail lines to Belgrade and Thessaloniki. Notably, the ArcelorMittal, Makstil steel plants and the Skopje Brewery are present there. Other zones are between Aerodrom and Kisela Voda, along the railway to Greece. These zones comprise Alkaloid Skopje (pharmaceuticals), Rade Končar (electrical supplies), Imperial Tobacco, and Ohis (fertilisers). Two special economic zones also exist, around the airport and the Okta refinery. They have attracted several foreign companies, such as Johnson Controls, Johnson Matthey and Van Hool.

As the country's financial capital, Skopje is the seat of the Macedonian Stock Exchange, of the National Bank, and of most of the country's banking, insurance, and telecommunication companies, such as Makedonski Telekom, Komercijalna banka Skopje and Stopanska Banka. The services sector produces 60% of the city GDP.

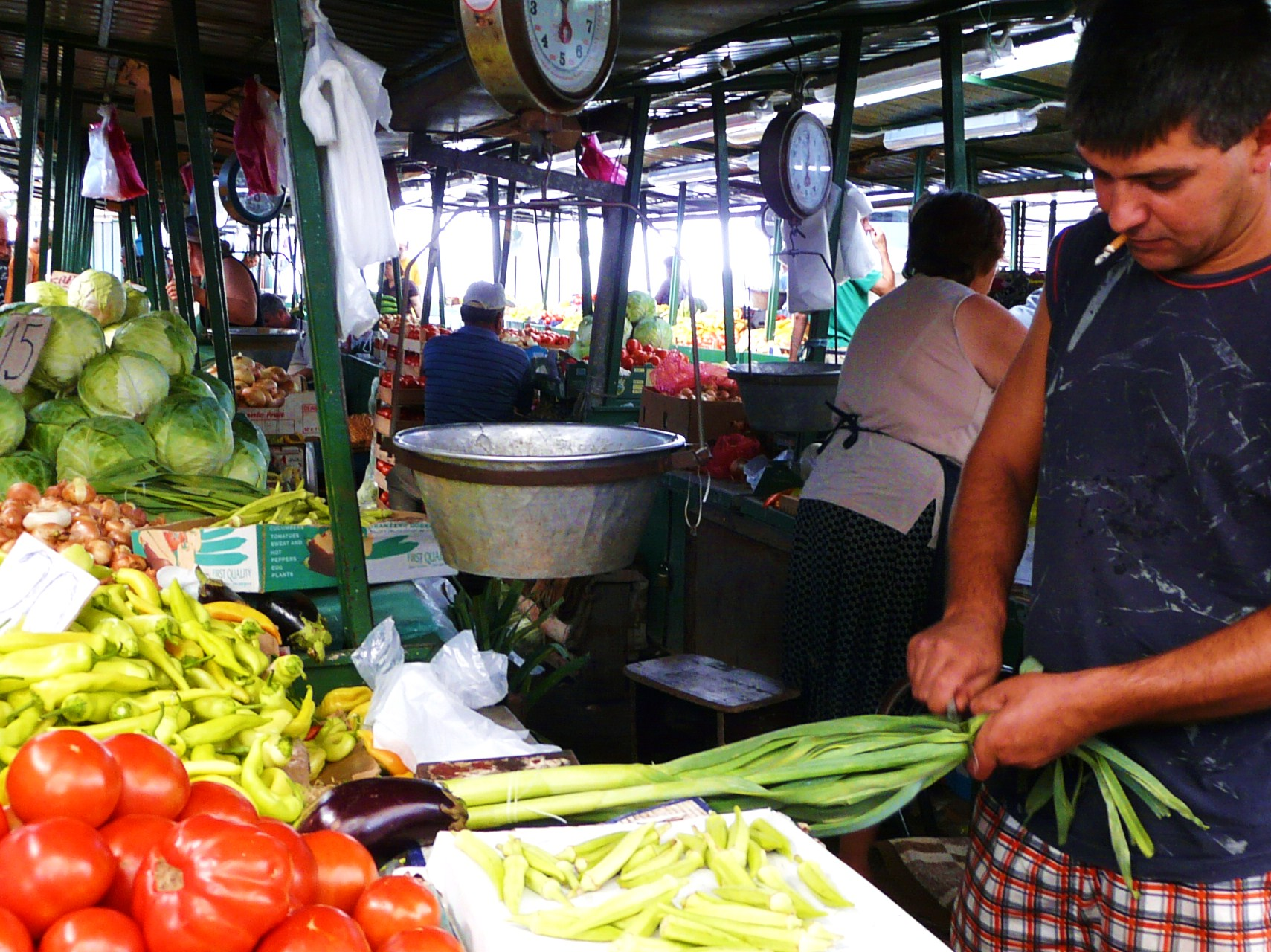
The Zelen Pazar ("green market")

Besides many small traditional shops, Skopje has two large markets, the "Zelen Pazar" (green market) and the "Bit Pazar" (flea market). They are both considered local institutions. However, since the 1970s, retailing has largely been modernised and Skopje now has many supermarkets and shopping centres. The largest, Skopje City Mall, opened in 2012. It comprises 130 shops and a cinema, and employs 2,000 people.

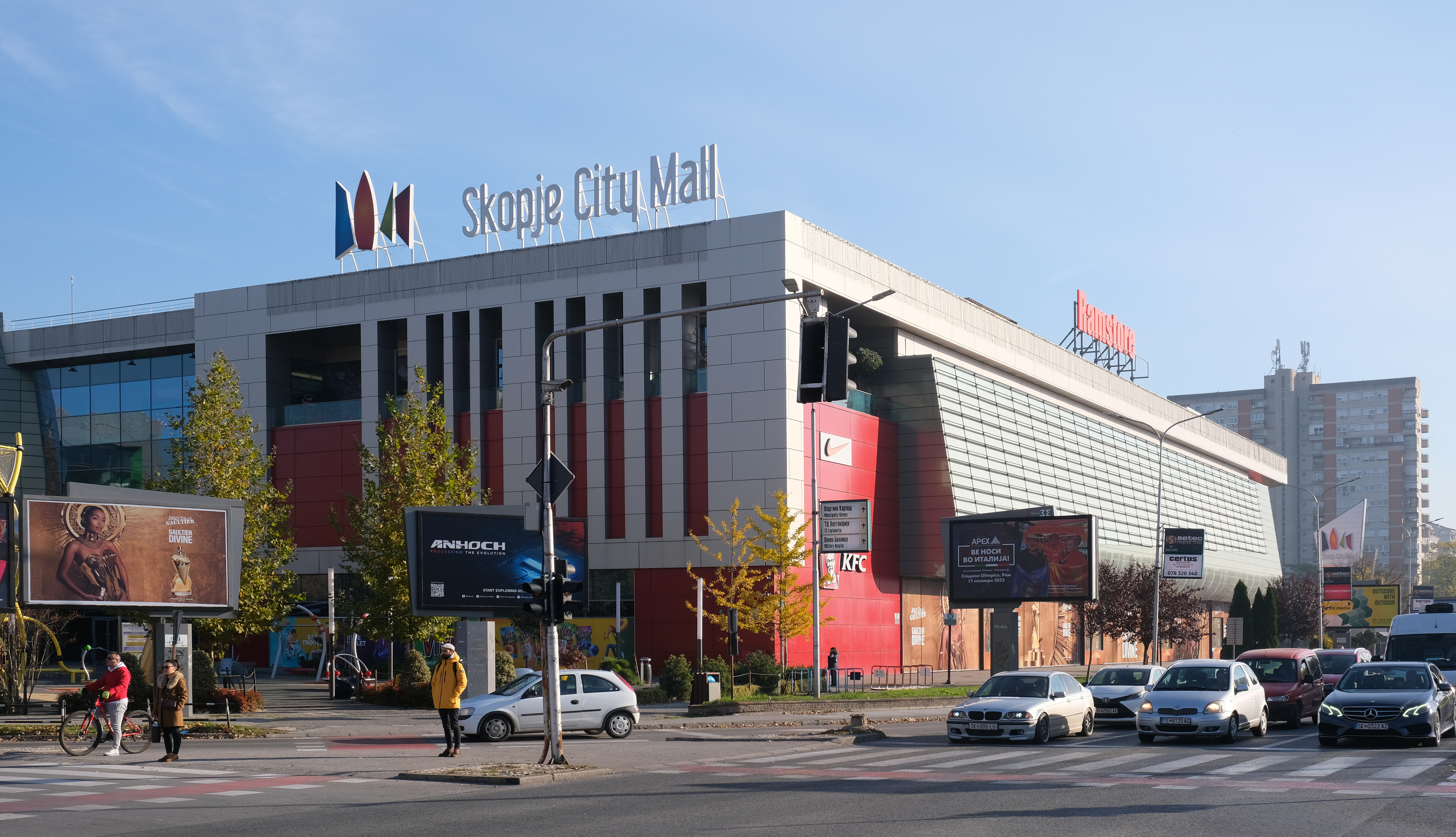
Skopje City Mall

=== Employment ===
51% of the Skopje active population is employed in small firms. 52% of the population work in the services sector, 34% in industry, and the remaining is mainly employed in administration.

The unemployment rate for the Skopje Statistical Region was at 27% in 2009, three points under the national rate (30%). The neighbouring Polog Region had a similar rate, but the less affected region was the South-West, with 22%. Unemployment in Skopje mainly affects men, who represent 56% of jobseekers, people between 25 and 44 years old (45% of jobseekers), and non-qualified people (43%). Unemployment also concerns Roma people, who represent 4.63% of the city population but affects 70% of the active population in the community.

The average net monthly wage in Skopje was at €400 in October 2010, which represented 120% of the national figure. The average wage in Skopje was then lower than in Sarajevo (€522), Sofia (€436), and in Belgrade (€440).

== Demographics ==
Historical population
Year	Pop.	±% p.a.
1921	41,000	—
1931	68,880	+5.32%
1948	88,355	+1.48%
1953	120,130	+6.34%
1961	166,870	+4.19%
1971	314,552	+6.54%
1981	448,200	+3.60%
1991	444,760	−0.08%
2002	506,926	+1.20%
2021	526,502	+0.20%

=== Population ===
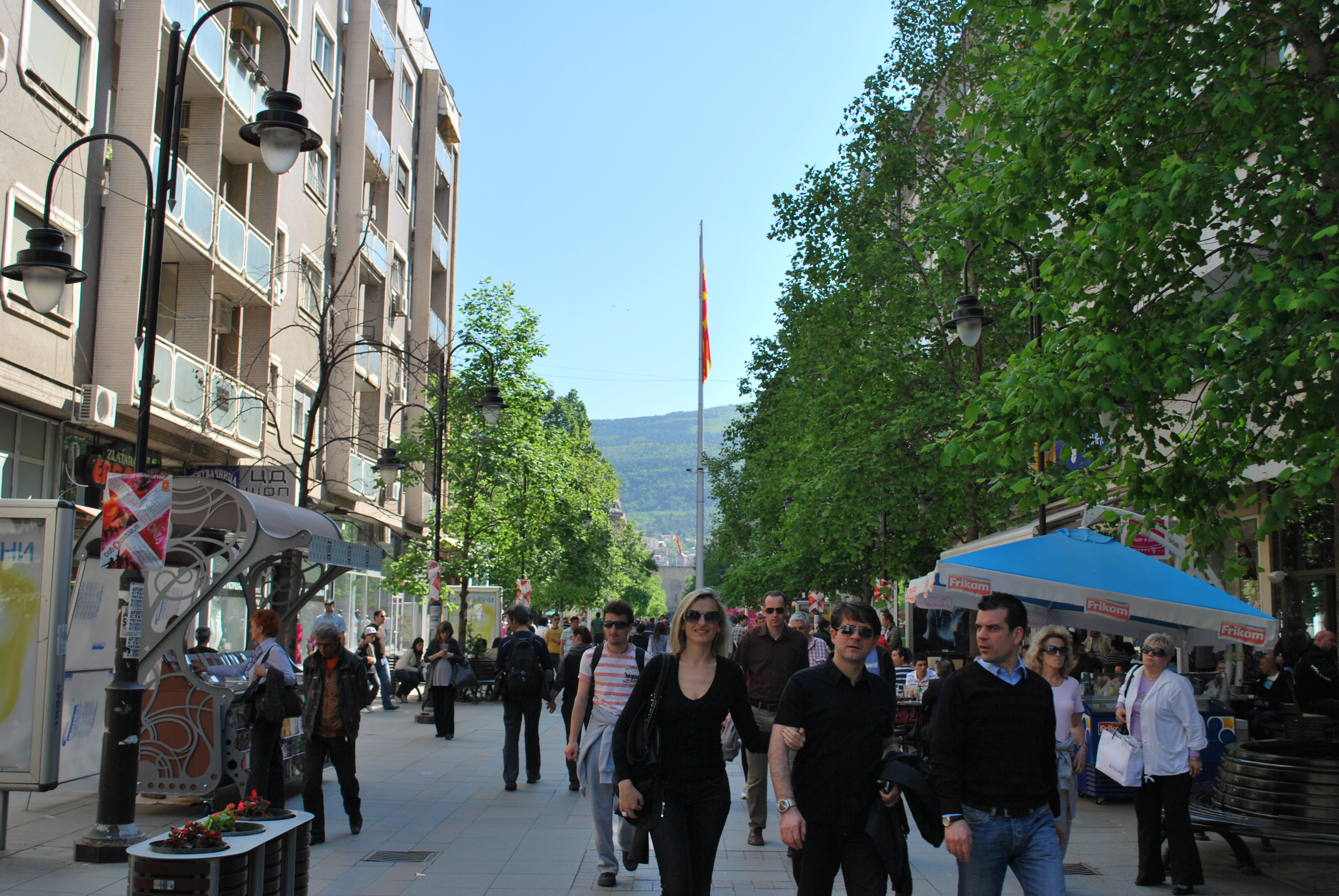
People on Macedonia street, the main pedestrian axis of the city

According to the results of the 2021 census, the City of Skopje had 526,502 inhabitants. Skopje's employment area covers a large part of the country, including Veles, Kumanovo and Tetovo, and totalling more than one million inhabitants.

Skopje contains roughly a quarter of North Macedonia's population. The second most populous municipality, Kumanovo, had 107,632 inhabitants in 2011, and an urban unit of 76,272 inhabitants in 2002.

Before the Austro-Turkish war and the 1689 Great Fire, Skopje was one of the biggest cities in the Balkans, with a population estimated between 30,000 and 60,000 inhabitants. After the fire set by the retreating Austrian forces, it experienced a long period of decline and only had 10,000 inhabitants in 1836. However, the population started to rise again after 1850 and reached 32,000 inhabitants in 1905. In the 20th century, Skopje was one of the fastest-growing cities in Yugoslavia, and it had 448,200 inhabitants in 1981. Since then, the demographic growth has continued at a steady rate.

=== Ethnic groups ===
Ethnic groups in Greater Skopje consist of the following:

Ethnic group	2002		2021	
Ethnic group	Number	%	Number	%
Macedonians	338,358	66.75	309,107	58.71
Albanians	103,891	20.49	120,293	22.85
Roma	23,475	4.63	18,498	3.51
Serbs	14,298	2.82	9,478	1.80
Turks	8,595	1.70	8,524	1.62
Bosniaks	7,585	1.50	7,365	1.50
Vlachs	2,557	0.50	2,778	0.53
Others	8,167	1.61	6,284	1.19
Administrative sources	N/A	N/A	44,175	8.39
Total	506,926	100	526,502	100

Skopje, just like North Macedonia as a whole, is characterised by a large ethnic diversity. The city is in a region where Macedonians and Albanians meet, and it has had populations of Bulgarians, Romani, Turks, Jews, and Serbs through its history. Skopje had a Muslim plurality until the 19th century due to the presence of Ottoman administrators and converts. According to the 2021 census, Macedonians were the largest ethnic group in Skopje, with 309,107 inhabitants, or 58.71% of the population. Then came Albanians with 120,293 inhabitants (22.85%), Roma people with 18,498 (3.51%), Serbs (9,478 inhabitants), Turks (8,524), Bosniaks (7,365) and Aromanians (also known as "Vlachs", 2,778). 6,284 people did not belong to any of these groups.

Macedonians form an overwhelming majority of the population in the municipalities of Aerodrom, Centar, Gorče Petrov, Karpoš and Kisela Voda, which are all south of the Vardar. They also form a majority in Butel and Gazi Baba which are north of the river. Albanians form a majority in Čair which roughly corresponds to the Old Bazaar, and in Saraj. They form a large minority in Butel and Gazi Baba. Suto Orizari, on the northern edge of the city, is predominantly Roma. When an ethnic minority forms at least 20% of the population in a municipality, its language can become official on the local level. Thus, in Čair and Saraj schools and administration use Albanian, and Romani in Šuto Orizari. The latter is the only municipality in the world where Romani is an official language.

Relations between the two largest groups, Macedonians and Albanians, are sometimes difficult, as in the rest of the country. Each group tolerates the other but they tend to avoid each other and live in what can appear as two parallel worlds. Both Macedonians and Albanians view themselves each as the original population of Skopje and the other as newcomers. The Roma minority is on its side very deprived. Its exact size is not known because many Macedonian Roma declare themselves as belonging to other ethnic groups or simply avoid censuses. However, even if official figures are underestimated, Skopje is the city in the world with the largest Roma population.

=== Religion ===
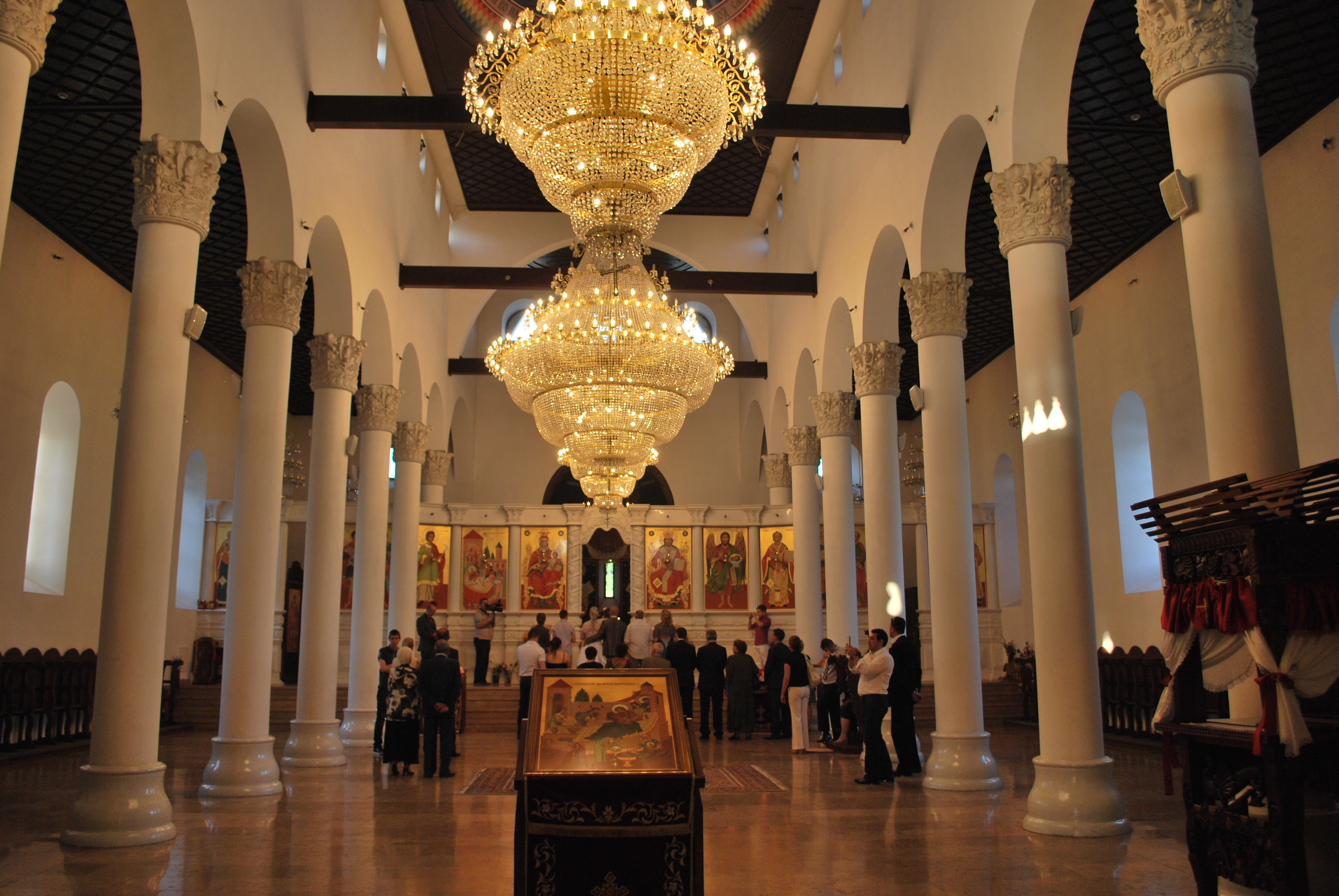
The Church of the Nativity of the Virgin Mary

Religious affiliation is diverse: Macedonians, Serbs, and Aromanians are mainly Eastern Orthodox, with the majority affiliated to the Macedonian Orthodox Church; Turks are almost entirely Muslim; those of Albanian ethnicity are largely Muslim, although Skopje also has a sizeable Roman Catholic Albanian minority, into which Mother Teresa was born; the Roma (Gypsies) represent a mixture (in almost equal numbers) of Muslim and Orthodox religious heritage.

According to the 2002 census, 68.5% of the population of Skopje belonged to the Eastern Orthodox Church, whilst 28.6% belonged to Islam. The city also had Catholic (0.5%) and Protestant (0.04%) minorities. The Catholics are served by the Latin bishopric of Skopje, in which is also vested the Byzantine Catholic Apostolic Exarchate of Macedonia.

	2002		2021	
	Number	%	Number	%
Total	506,926	100	526,502	100
Orthodox	348,837	68.8	264,872	60.3
Christians	216	0.49	50,624	60.3
Catholics	2,506	0.04	2,044	60.3
Islam	143,770	28.4	155,245	29.5
Others	11,597	1.81	9,542	1.81
Administrative sources			44,175	8.39

Until World War II, Skopje had a significant Jewish minority which mainly descended from Spanish Sephardis who had escaped the Inquisition. The community comprised 2,424 members in 1939 (representing about 3% of the city population), but most of them were deported and killed by Nazis. After the war, most of the survivors settled in Israel. Today the city has around 200 Jewish inhabitants (about 0.04% of the population). Most of the country's entire remaining Jewish population is centered in Skopje.

Because of its 520-year Ottoman past, and the fact that many of its inhabitants today are Muslims, Skopje has more mosques than churches. Religious communities often complain about the lack of infrastructure and new places of worship are often built. Skopje is the seat of many Macedonian religious organisations, such as the Macedonian Orthodox Church and the Islamic Religious Union of Macedonia. It has an Orthodox cathedral and seminary, several madrasahs, a Roman Catholic cathedral and a synagogue.

=== Health ===
Skopje has several public and private hospitals and specialised medical institutions, such as the Filip II Hospital, a psychiatric hospital, two obstetric hospitals, a gerontology hospital, and institutes for respiratory and ocular diseases. In 2012, Skopje had a ratio of one physician per 251.6 inhabitants, a figure higher than the national ratio (one per 370.9). The ratio of medical specialists was also higher than in the rest of the country. However, the ratio of hospital beds, pharmacists and dentists was lower in Skopje. The population in Skopje enjoys better health standards than other Macedonians. In 2010, the mortality rate was at 8.6‰ in Skopje and 9.3‰ on the national level. The infant mortality rate was at 6.8‰ in Skopje and 7.6‰ in North Macedonia.

=== Education ===
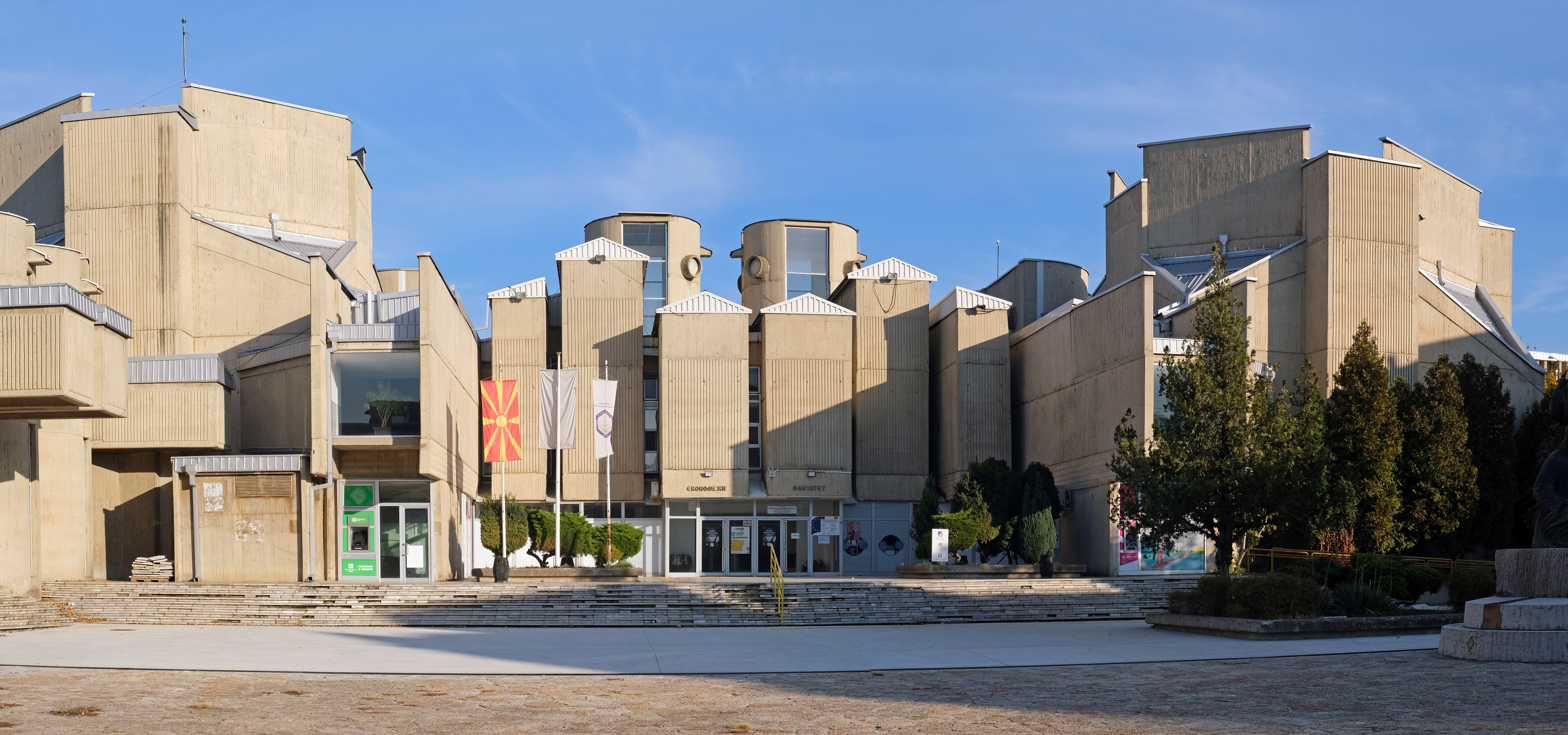
Faculty of Economics, Ss. Cyril and Methodius University.

Skopje's citizenry is generally more educated than the rest of the country. 16% of Skopjans have graduated from university in contrast to 10% for the rest of the country. The number of people with a complete lack of education or ones who received a partial education is lower in Skopje at 9% compared to the provincial average of 17%. 80% of Macedonian citizens who hold a PhD take up residence in Skopje.

Skopje has 21 secondary schools; 5 of which serve as general high-school gymnasiums and 16 vocational schools. The city is also host to several higher education institutions, the most notable of which is Ss. Cyril and Methodius University, founded in 1949. The university has 23 departments, 10 research institutes and is attended by an average of 50,000 students. After the country's independence in 1991, several private universities were brought into existence. The largest private universities in Skopje are European University Skopje with 7 departments and FON University with 9 departments respectively.

== Media ==
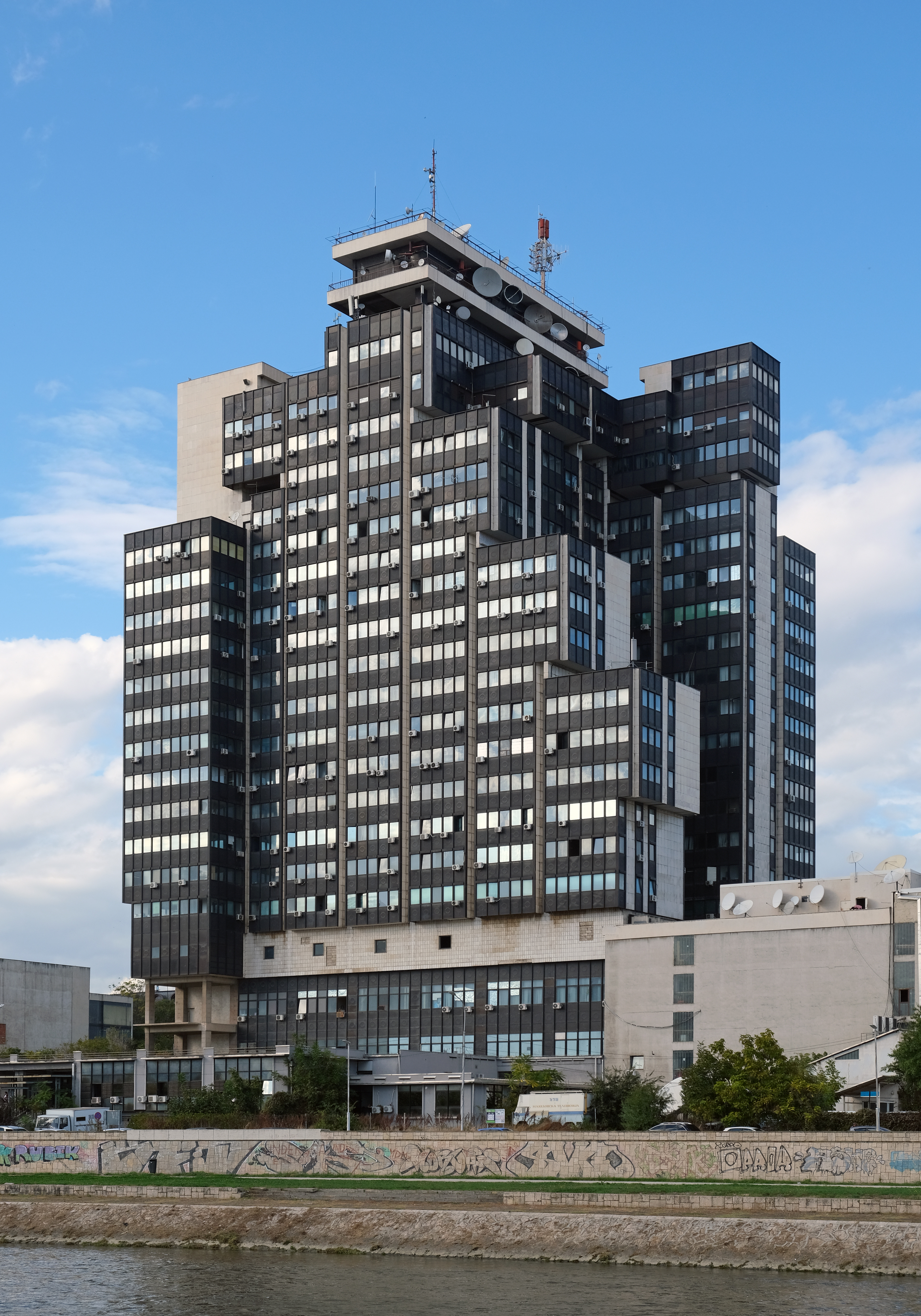
The Macedonian Radio-Television headquarters

Skopje is the largest media centre in North Macedonia. Of the 818 newspapers surveyed in 2000 by the Ministry of Information, over 600 had their headquarters in Skopje. The daily Dnevnik, founded in 1996, with 60,000 runs per day is the most printed in the country. Also based in Skopje, Večer prints 50,000 copies and the state owns one-third of its capital. Nova Makedonija, reprinted 20,000 copies. Other major newspapers in Skopje, totally private, are Utrinski Vesnik (30,000 copies), Vest (25,000 copies), and Vreme (15,000 copies). Magazines Fokus (12,000 copies), Start (10,000 copies), and Denes (7,500 copies) also have their headquarters in Skopje.

The city is home of the studios of Macedonian Radio-Television (MRT), the country's public radio and television. Founded in 1966, it operates with three national broadcast channels, twenty-four hours a day. The most popular private television stations are Sitel, Kanal 5, Telma, Alfa TV, and AlsatM. MRT also operates radio stations with national coverage, the private station Skopje's Kanal 77 is the only one to have such a span. Radio Antenna 5 and Metropolis are two other major private stations that have their headquarters in Skopje.

Also, the city boasts big news agencies in the country, both public, such as the Media Information Agency, and private, such as the Makfax.

== Sports ==
As the capital and largest city of North Macedonia, Skopje has many major sporting facilities. The city has three large swimming pools, two of which feature Olympic pools. These pools are particularly relevant to coaching water polo teams. Skopje also boasts many football stadiums, like Ilinden in Čair and Železarnica, which can accommodate between 4,000 and 4,500 spectators. The basketball court Kale can accommodate 2,200 people and the court of Jane Sandanski has a 6,000-seat capacity.

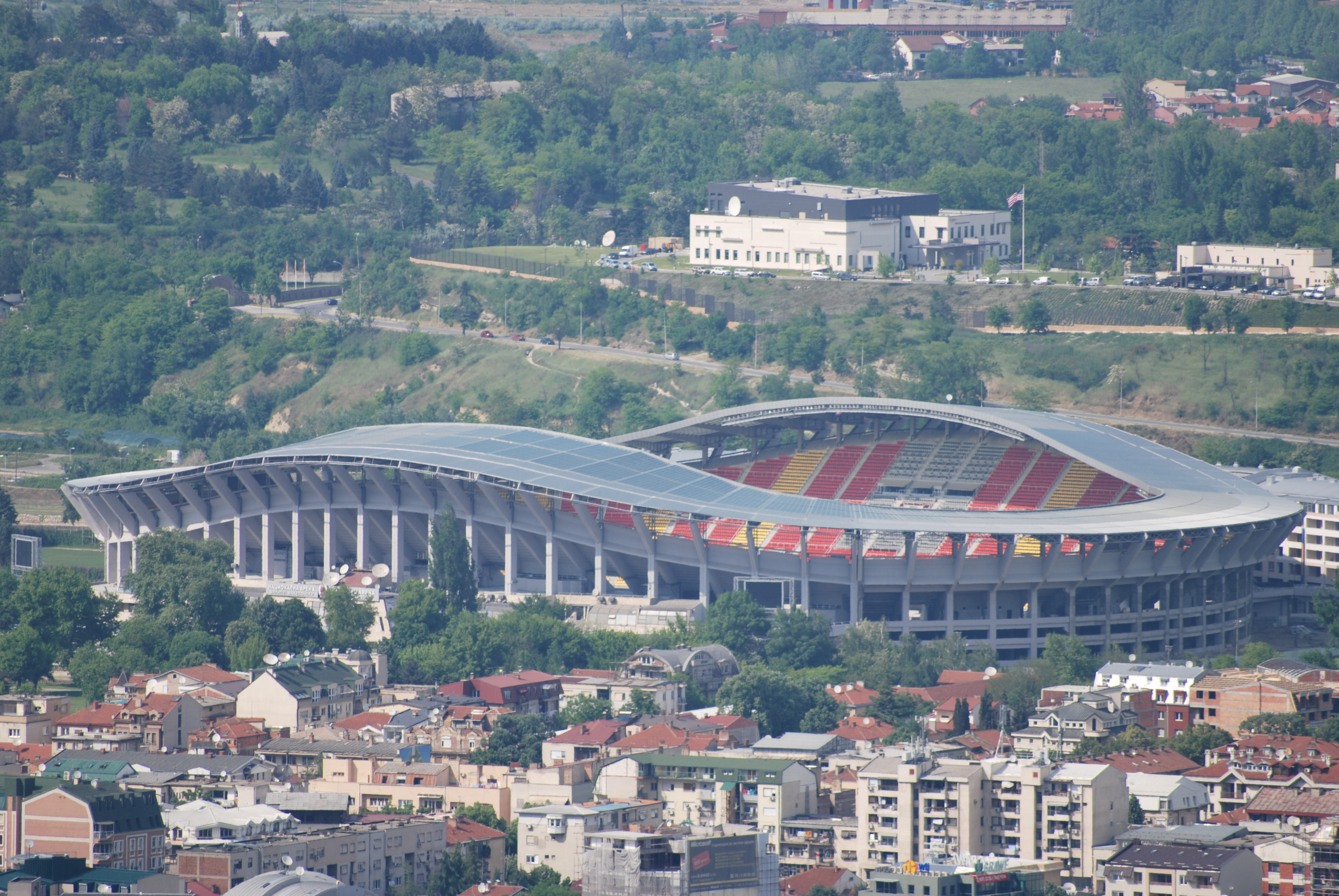
The Toše Proeski Arena

The largest stadium remains Toše Proeski Arena. The stadium, built in 1947 and named until 2008, City Stadium Skopje experienced a total renovation, begun in 2009 to meet the standards of FIFA. Fully renovated the stadium contains 33,460 seats, and a health spa and fitness area. The Boris Trajkovski Sports Center is the largest sports complex in the country with 6,250 seats. It was opened in 2008 and named after former president Boris Trajkovski, who died in 2004. It includes rooms dedicated to handball, basketball, and volleyball, a bowling alley, a fitness area, and an ice hockey court. Its main hall, which regularly hosts concerts, holds around 10,000 people.

FK Vardar, FK Rabotnički and KF Shkupi are the three most popular football teams in the city. They play in the first division. Their games are held at Toše Proeski Arena, like those of the national team. The city is also home to many smaller football clubs, such as: FK Makedonija Ǵorče Petrov, FK Gorno Lisiče, KF Fortuna 1975, FK Lokomotiva Skopje, FK Metalurg Skopje, FK Madžari Solidarnost and FK Skopje, who play in first, second or third national league. Another popular sport in North Macedonia is basketball, represented in particular by the teams MZT Skopje and Rabotnički. Handball is illustrated by RK Vardar PRO and RK Metalurg Skopje, also the women's team ŽRK Metalurg and ŽRK Vardar. The city co-hosted the 2008 European Women's Handball Championship together with Ohrid, and hosted the 2017 UEFA Super Cup, the match between Real Madrid and Manchester United.

== Transport ==
=== Main connections ===
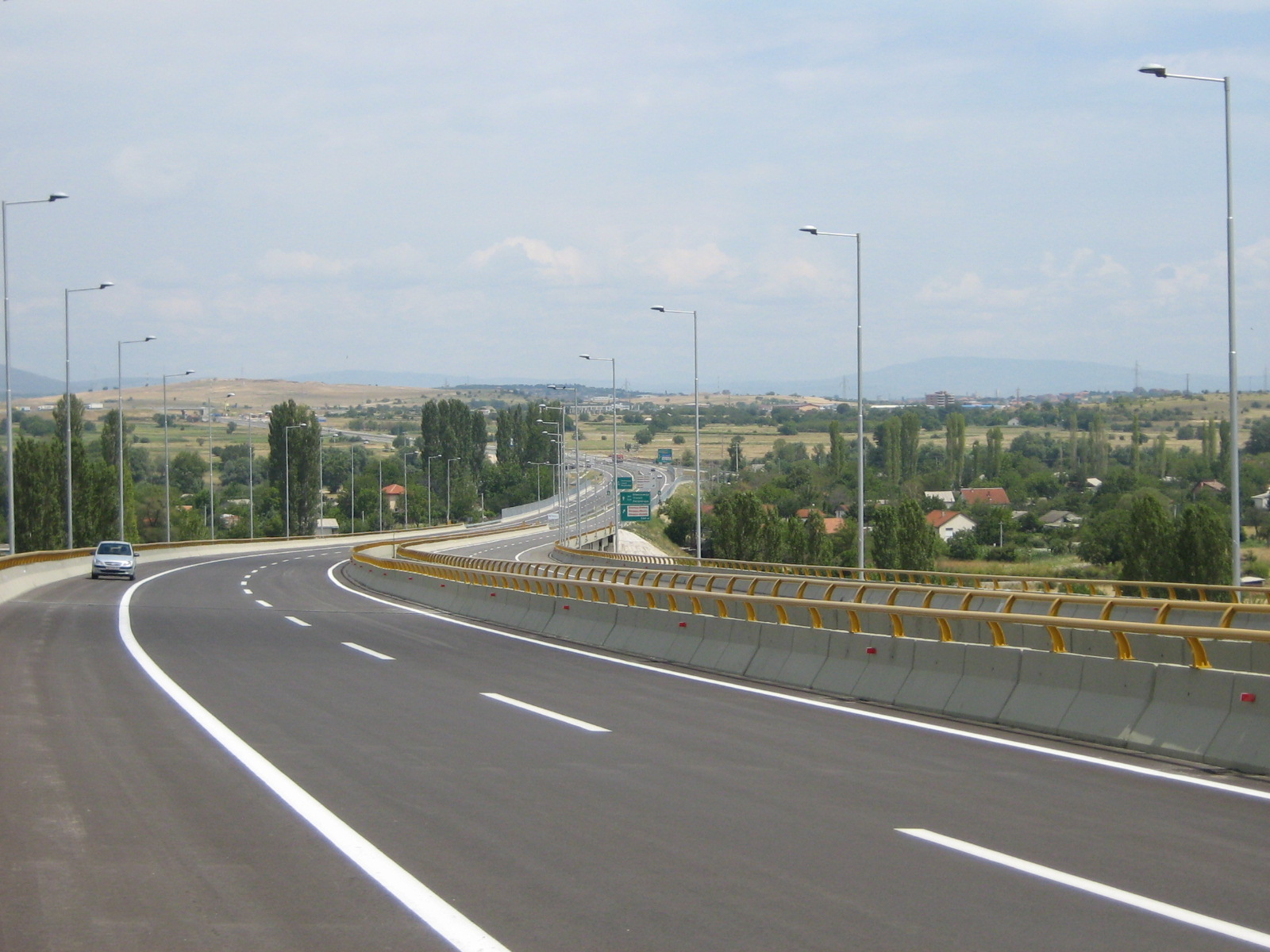
Skopje bypass

Skopje is near three other capital cities, Pristina (87 km (54 mi) away), Tirana (291 km) and Sofia (245 km). Thessaloniki is 233 km (145 mi) south and Belgrade is 433 km (269 mi) north. Skopje is also at the crossroad of two Pan-European corridors: Corridor X, which runs between Austria and Greece, and Corridor VIII, which runs from the Adriatic in Albania to the Black Sea in Bulgaria. Corridor X links Skopje to Thessaloniki, Belgrade, Zagreb, Ljubljana and Western Europe, whilst Corridor VIII links it with Tirana and Sofia.

Corridor X locally corresponds to the A1 motorway (E75), which is the longest motorway in North Macedonia. It also corresponds to the Tabanovce-Gevgelija railway. Corridor VIII, less developed, corresponds to the A2 motorway and the Kičevo-Beljakovce railway. Skopje is not quite on the Corridor X and the A1 does not pass on the city territory. Thus the interchange between the A1, A2 and A4 motorways is some 20 km (12 mi) east, close to the airport. Although Skopje is geographically close to other major cities, movement of people and goods is not optimised, especially with Albania. This is mainly due to poor infrastructure. As a result, 61.8% of Skopjans have never been to Tirana, whilst only 6.7% have never been to Thessaloniki and 0% to Sofia. Furthermore, 26% of Thessalonians, 33% of Sofians and 37% of Tiranans have never been to Skopje.

The first motorways were built during the Yugoslav period, when Skopje was linked through the Brotherhood and Unity Highway to, what was then, the Yugoslav capital Belgrade to the North, and the Greek border to the South. These southern segments of the Brotherhood and Unity Highway were finalized in 1963, coinciding with the city's reconstruction in the direct aftermath of the July 1963 earthquake. However, the Macedonian segments of the highway would retain a less modernized infrastructure than other parts until the dissolution of Yugoslavia.

=== Rail and coach stations ===
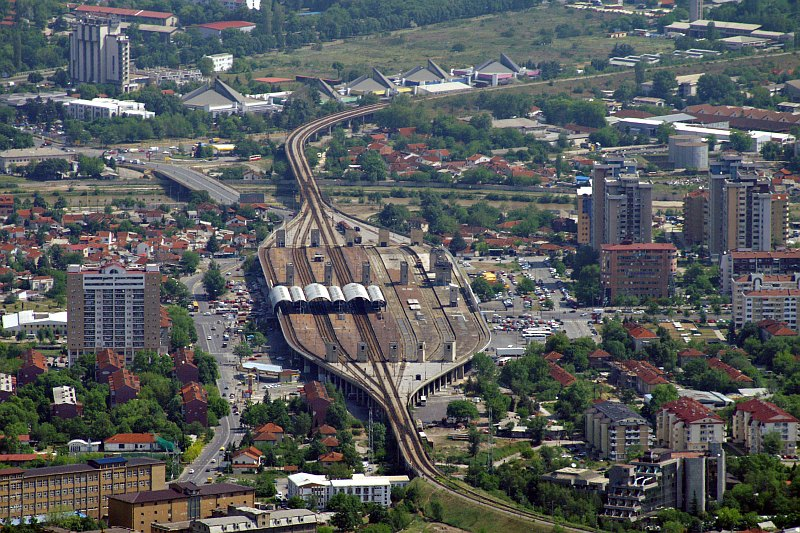
Main railway station as seen from Mount Vodno

The main railway station in Skopje is serviced by the Belgrade-Thessaloniki and Skopje-Pristina international lines. After the completion of the Corridor VIII railway project, currently scheduled for 2030, the city will also be linked to Tirana and Sofia. Daily trains also link Skopje with other towns of North Macedonia, such as Kumanovo, Kičevo, Štip, Bitola or Veles.

Skopje has several minor railway stations, but the city does not have its own railway network, and they are only serviced by intercity or international lines. On the railway linking the main station to Belgrade and Thessaloniki are Dračevo and Dolno Lisiče stations, and on the railway to Kičevo are Skopje-North, Ǵorče Petrov and Saraj stations. Several other stations are freight-only.

Skopje coach station opened in 2005 and is built right under the main railway station. It can host 450 coaches in a day. Coach connections reach more destinations than train connections, connecting Skopje to many domestic and foreign destinations including Istanbul, Sofia, Prague, Hamburg and Stockholm.

=== Public transport ===
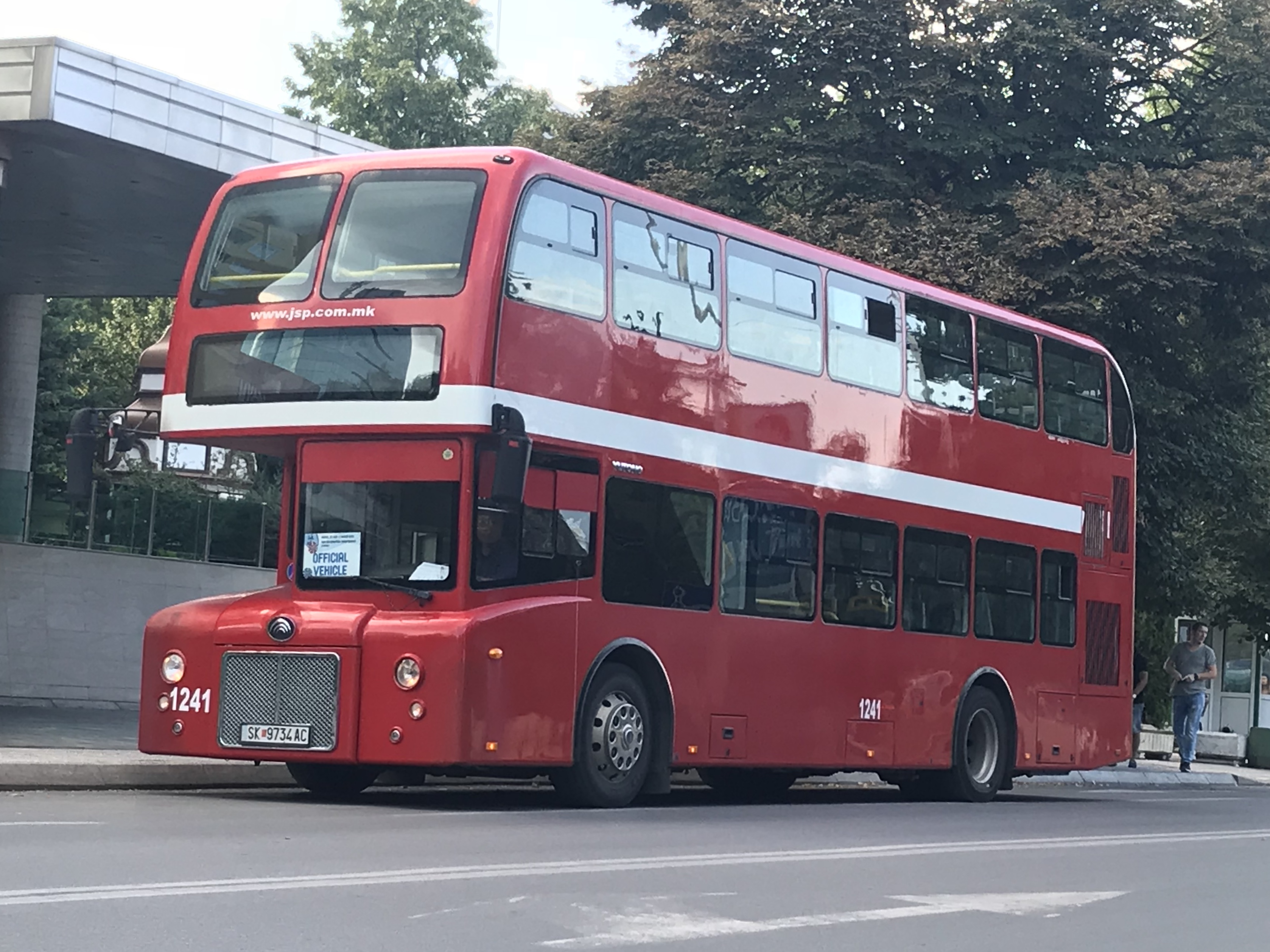
A red Yutong City Master double-decker bus in Skopje

Skopje has a bus network managed by the city and operated by three companies. The oldest and largest is JSP Skopje, a public company founded in 1948. JSP lost its monopoly on public transport in 1990 and two new companies, Sloboda Prevoz and Mak Ekspres, obtained several lines. However, most of the network is still in the hands of JSP which operates 67 lines out of 80. Only 24 lines are urban, the others serving localities around the city. Many of the JSP vehicles are red Yutong City Master double-decker buses built by Chinese bus manufacturer Yutong and designed to resemble the classic British AEC Routemaster.

A tram network has long been planned in Skopje and the idea was first proposed in the 1980s. The project became real in 2006 when the mayor Trifun Kostovski asked for feasibility studies. His successor Koce Trajanovski launched a call for tenders in 2010 and the first line is scheduled for 2019.

A new network for small buses started to operate in June 2014, not to replace but to decrease the number of big buses in the city centre.

In the 2020s, the city worked on plans for a two-line bus rapid transit (BRT) system with EBRD backing, which would become the first system of that type in the Western Balkans. However, although financing had already been approved, the project became a contentious topic during the 2021 mayoral elections, and the newly elected mayor halted all BRT proceedings.

Skopje has a suburban rail line operating between the main train station and the village of Zelenikovo, established in 2026.

=== Airport ===
The airport was built in 1928. The first commercial flights in Skopje were introduced in 1929 when the Yugoslav carrier Aeroput introduced a route linking the city with the capital, Belgrade. A year later the route was extended to Thessaloniki in Greece, and further extended to Greek capital Athens in 1933. In 1935 Aeroput linked Skopje with Bitola and Niš, and also operated a longer international route linking Vienna and Thessaloniki through Zagreb, Belgrade and Skopje. After the Second World War, Aeroput was replaced by Yugoslav Airlines, which linked Skopje to a number of domestic and international destinations; it underwent a name change to JAT Airways in August 2003.

Skopje International Airport is in Petrovec, 20 km (12 mi) east of the city. Since 2008, it has been managed by the Turkish TAV Airports Holding and it can accommodate up to four million passengers per year. The annual traffic has constantly risen since 2008, reaching one million passengers in 2014.

Skopje's airport has connections to several European cities, including Athens, Vienna, Zürich, Brussels, Oslo, Istanbul, London and Rome, as well as destinations across the Western Balkans and the Middle East.

Ground transportation to and from the airport includes taxis, private transfer services, and shuttle buses connecting the airport with Skopje city centre.

== Culture ==
=== Cultural institutions ===
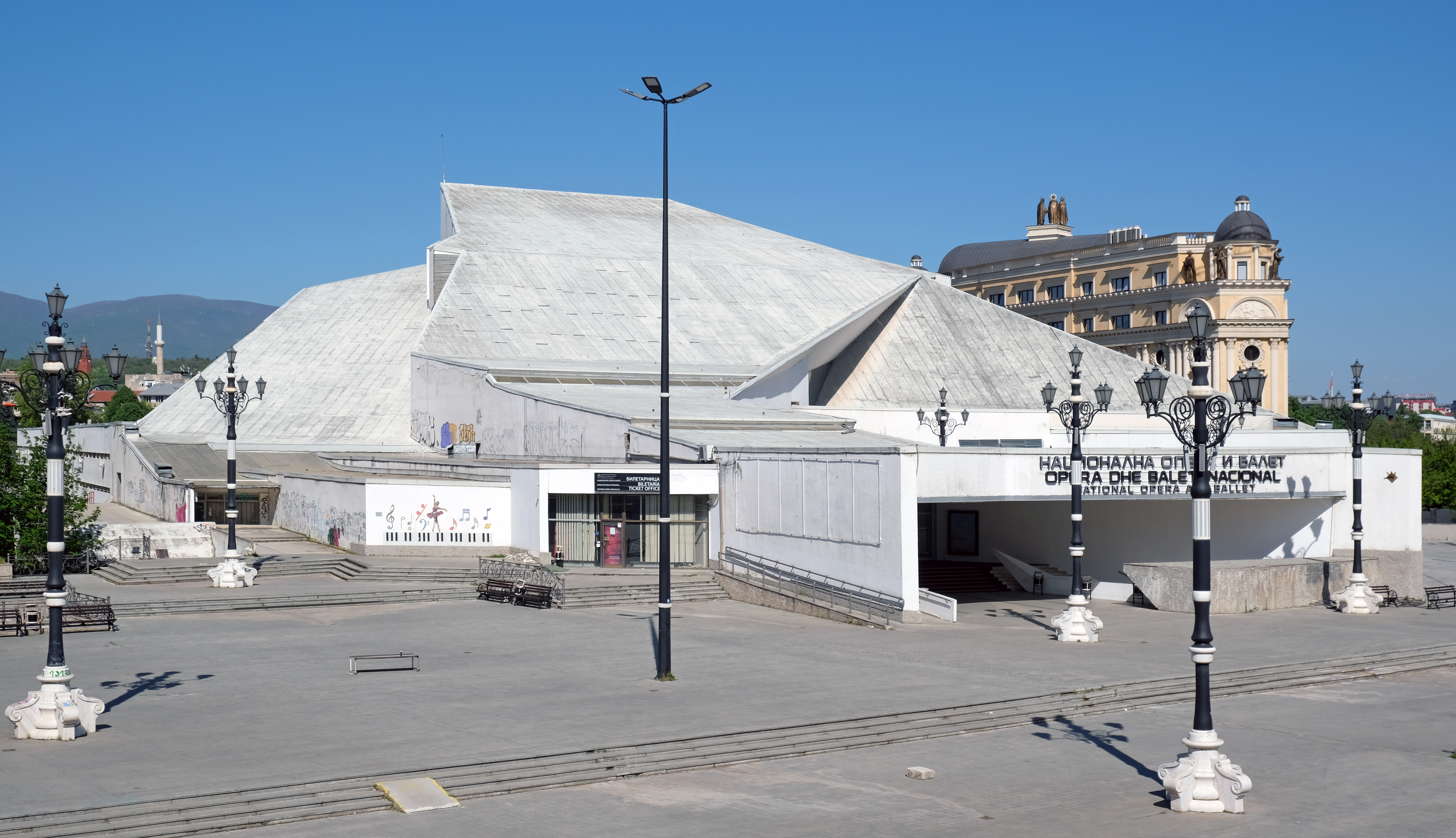
Macedonian Opera and Ballet

Skopje is home to the largest cultural institutions of the country, such as the National and University Library "St. Kliment of Ohrid", the Macedonian Academy of Sciences and Arts, the National Theatre, the National Philharmonic Orchestra and the Macedonian Opera and Ballet. Amongst the local institutions are the Brothers Miladinov Library which has more than a million documents, the Cultural Information Centre which manages festivals, exhibitions and concerts, and the House of Culture Kočo Racin which is dedicated to contemporary art and young talents.

Skopje also has several foreign cultural centres, such as a Goethe-Institut, a British Council, an Alliance française, an American Corner.

The city has several theatres and concert halls. The Univerzalna Sala, seating 1,570, was built in 1966 and is used for concerts, fashion shows, and congresses. The Metropolis Arena, designed for large concerts, has 3,546 seats. Other large halls include the Macedonian Opera and Ballet (800 seats), the National Theatre (724), and the Drama Theatre (333). Other smaller venues exist, such as the Albanian Theatre and the Youth Theatre. A Turkish Theatre and a Philharmonic hall are under construction.

=== Museums ===
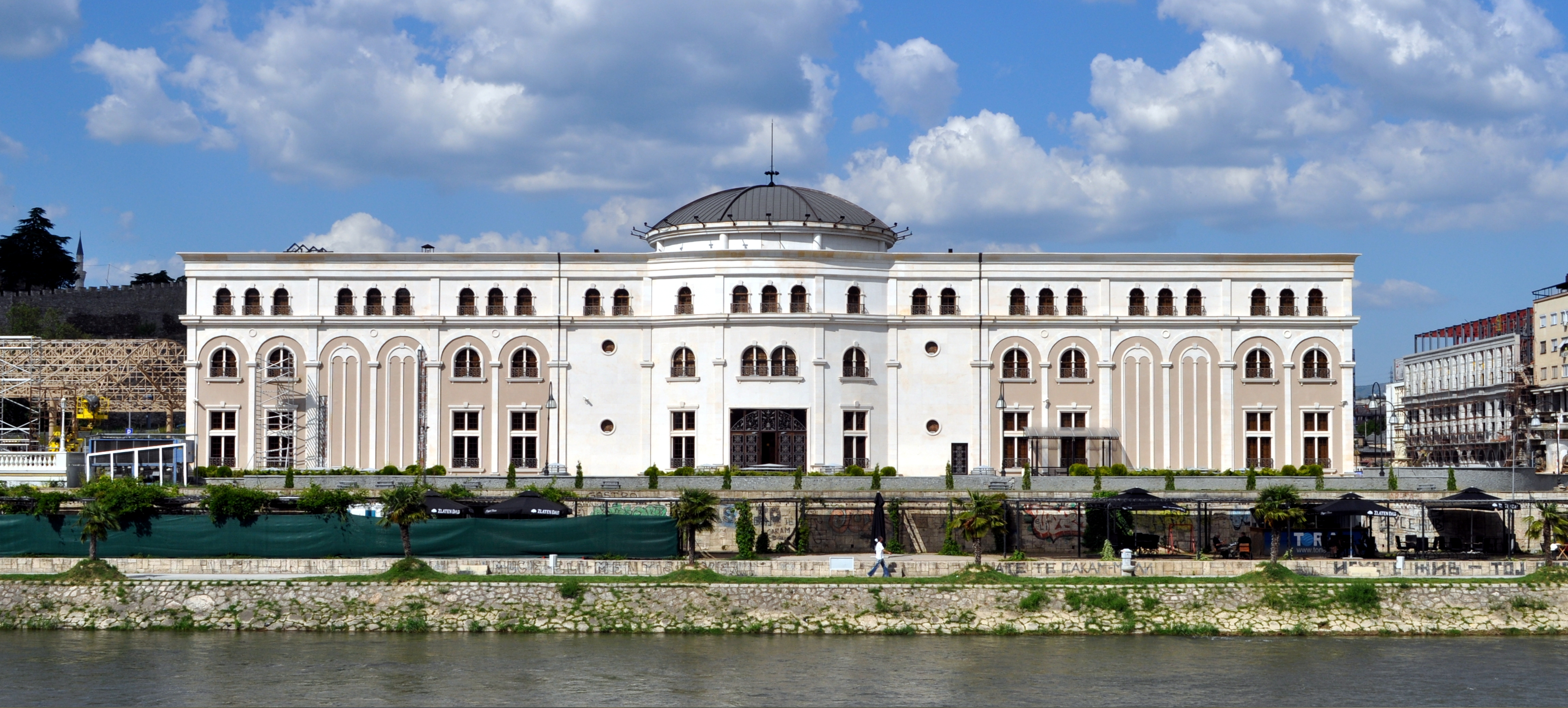
Museum of the Macedonian Struggle

The largest museum in Skopje is the Museum of the Republic of North Macedonia which details the history of the country. Its icons and lapidary collections are particularly rich. The Macedonian Archaeological Museum, opened in 2014, keeps archaeological finds in North Macedonia, dating from Prehistory to the Ottoman period. The National Gallery of Macedonia exhibits paintings dating from the 14th to the 20th century in two former hammams of the Old Bazaar. The Contemporary Art Museum was built after the 1963 earthquake thanks to international assistance. Its collections include Macedonian and foreign art, with works by Fernand Léger, André Masson, Pablo Picasso, Hans Hartung, Victor Vasarely, Alexander Calder, Pierre Soulages, Alberto Burri and Christo.

The Skopje City Museum is inside the remains of the old railway station, destroyed by the 1963 earthquake. It is dedicated to local history, and it has four departments: archaeology, ethnology, history, and art history. The Memorial House of Mother Teresa was built in 2009 on the original site of the church in which the nun had been baptised. The Museum of the Macedonian Struggle is dedicated to the modern national history and the struggle of Macedonians for their independence. Nearby is the Holocaust Memorial Center for the Jews of Macedonia. The Macedonian Museum of Natural History showcases some 4,000 items whilst the 12-ha Skopje Zoo is home to 300 animals.

=== Architecture ===
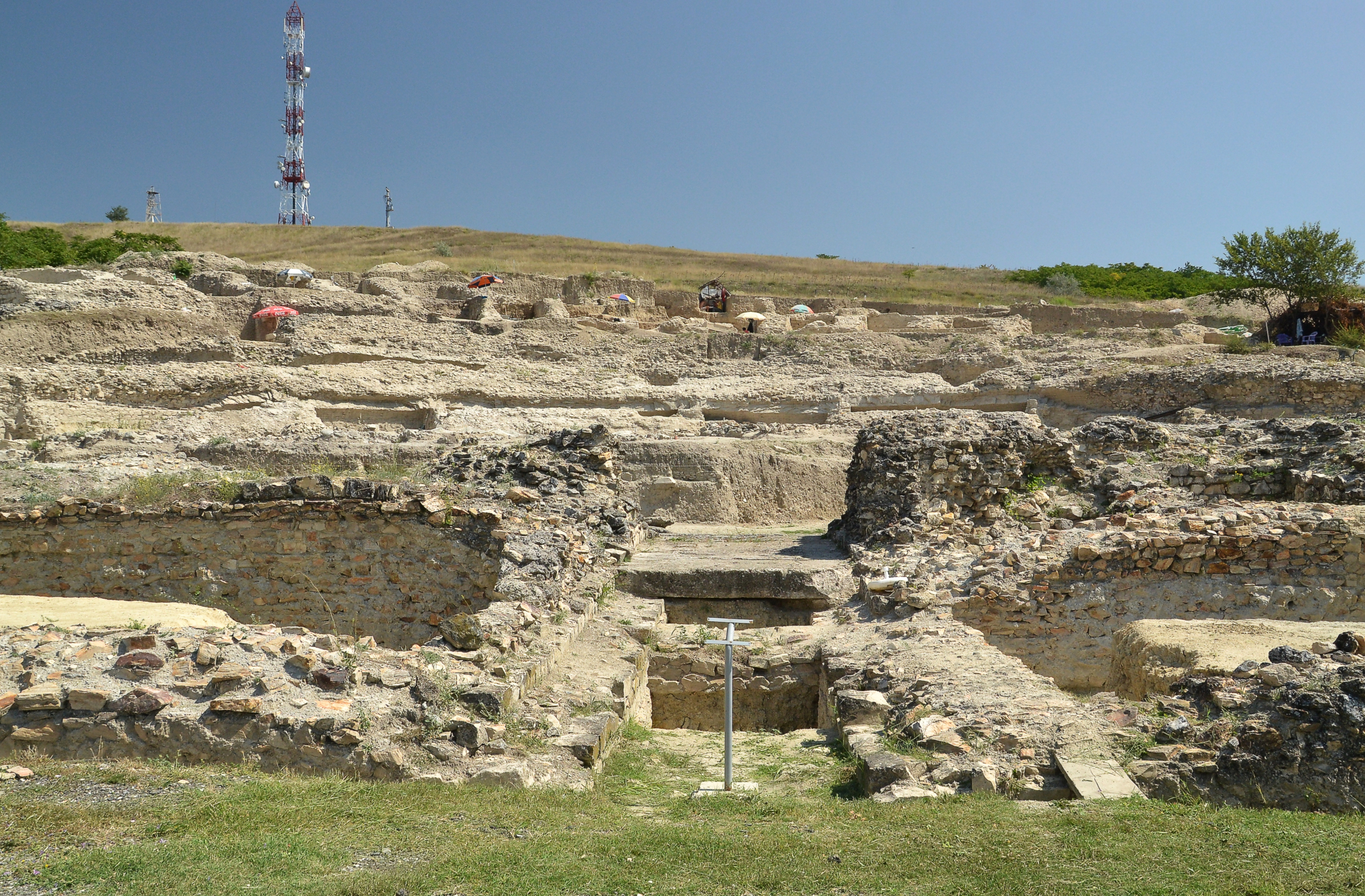
Ruins of Roman Scupi

Although Skopje has been destroyed many times throughout its history, it still has many historical landmarks which reflect the successive occupations of the city. Skopje has one of the biggest Ottoman urban complexes in Europe, with many Ottoman monuments still serving their original purpose. It was also a ground for modernist experiments in the 20th century, following the 1963 earthquake. At the beginning of the 21st century, it is again the subject of massive building campaigns, thanks to the Skopje 2014 project. Skopje is thus an environment where old, new, progressist, reactionary, eastern and western perspectives coexist.

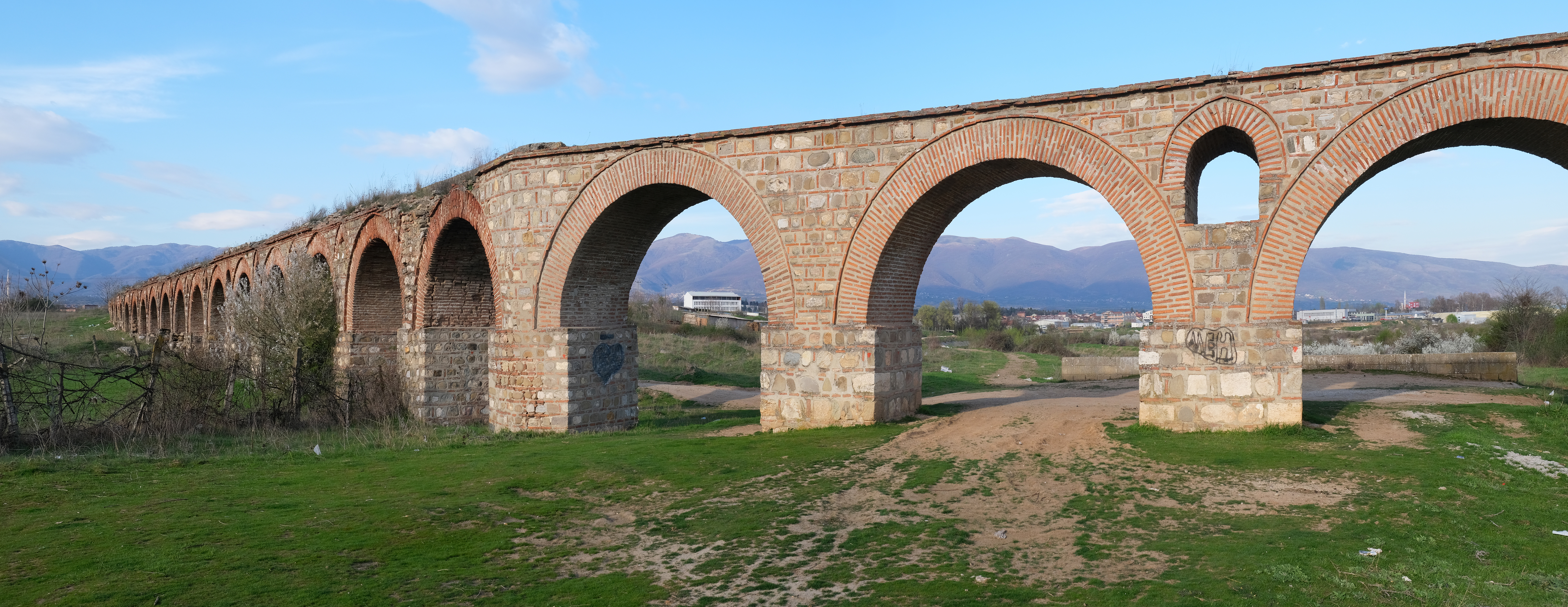
Skopje Aqueduct

Skopje has some remains of Prehistorical architecture which can be seen on the Tumba Madžari Neolithic site. On the other side of the city lies the remains of the ancient Scupi, with ruins of a theatre, thermae and a basilica. The Skopje Aqueduct, between Scupi and the city centre, is rather mysterious because its date of construction is unknown. It seems to have been built by the Byzantines or the Turks, but it was already out of use in the 16th century. It consists of 50 arches, worked in cloisonné masonry.

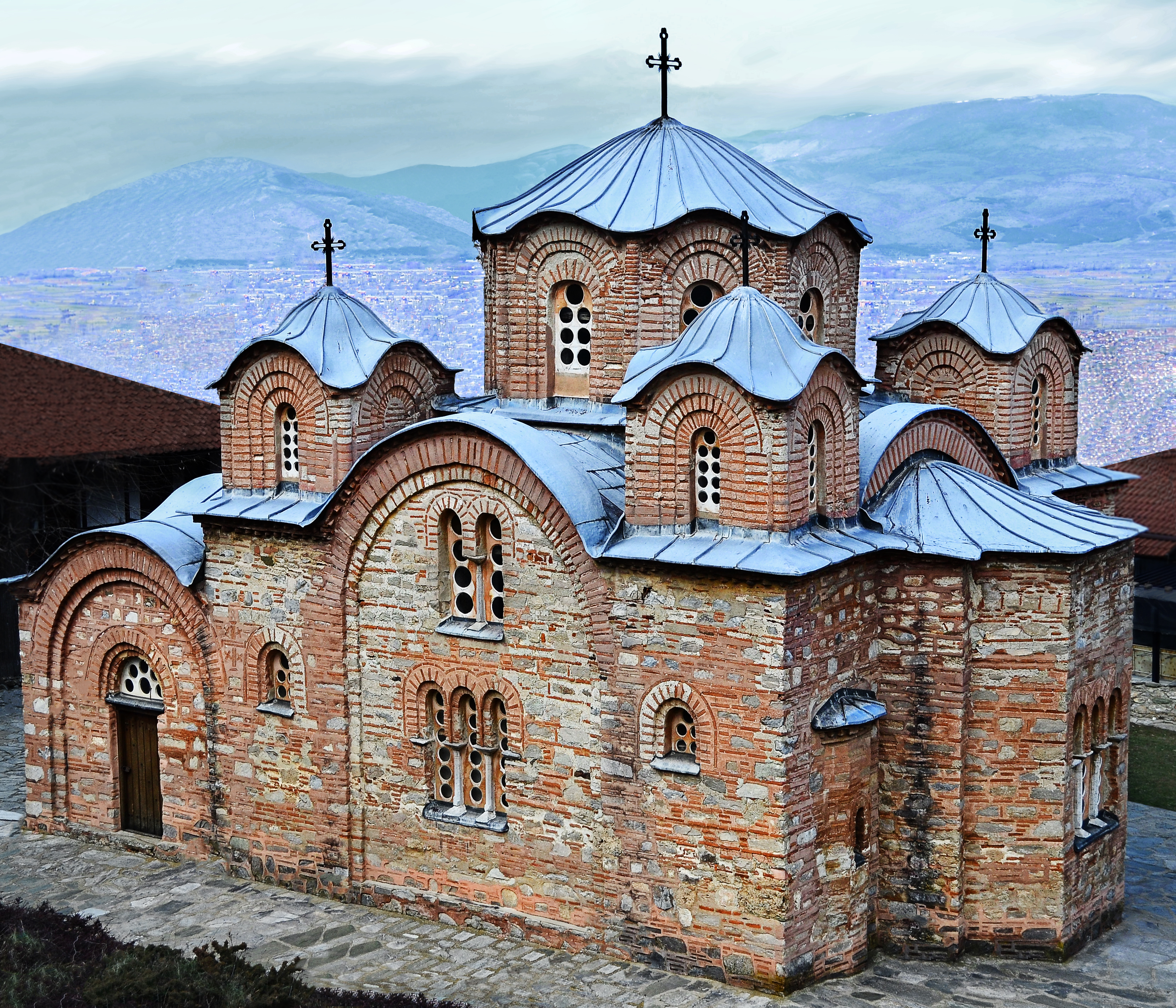
Church of Saint Panteleimon

Skopje Fortress was rebuilt several times before it was destroyed by the 1963 earthquake. Since then, it has been restored to its medieval appearance. It is the only medieval monument in Skopje, but several churches around the city illustrate the Vardar architectural school which flourished around 1300. Amongst these churches are the ones around Matka Canyon (St Nicholas, St Andrew and Matka churches). The church of Saint Panteleimon in Gorno Nerezi dates from the 12th century. Its expressive frescoes anticipate the Italian primitives.

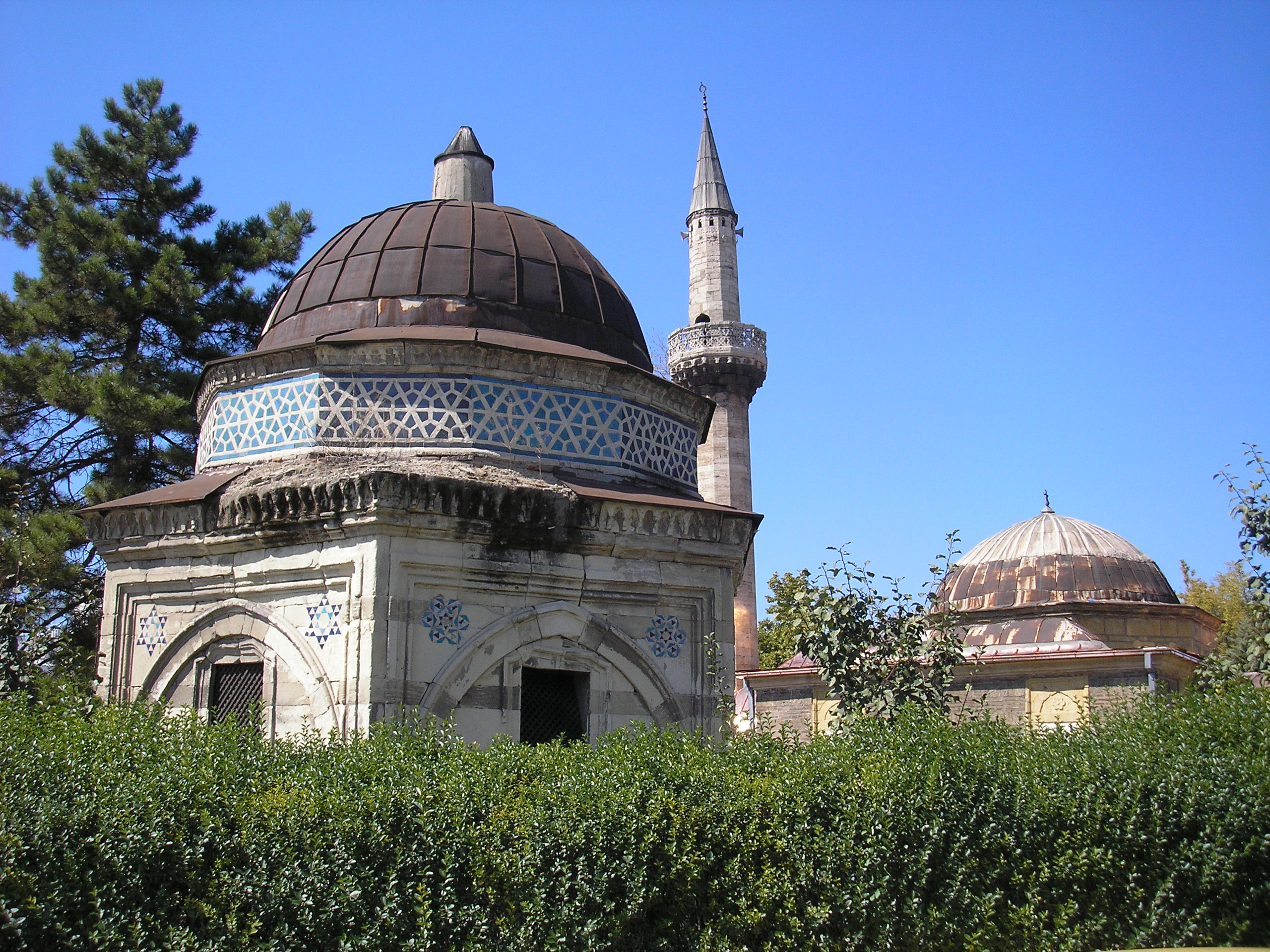
Aladža Mosque and its türbe

Examples of Ottoman architecture are in the Old Bazaar. Mosques in Skopje are usually simple in design, with a square base and a single dome and minaret. Their entrance is usually emphasised by a portico, as on Mustafa Pasha Mosque, dating from the 15th century. Some mosques show some originality in their appearance: Sultan Murad and Yahya Pasha mosques have lost their dome and have a pyramidal roof, whilst Isa Bey Mosque has a rectangular base, two domes and two side wings. The Aladža Mosque was originally covered with blue faience, but it disappeared in the 1689 Great Fire. However, some tiles are still visible on the adjoining türbe. Other Ottoman public monuments include the 16th-century clock tower, a bedesten, three caravanserais, two hammams and the Stone Bridge, first mentioned in 1469.

The oldest churches in the city centre, the Ascension and St Dimitri churches, were built in the 18th century, after the 1689 Great Fire. They were both renovated in the 19th century. The Church of the Ascension is particularly small as it is half-buried in order to not overlook neighbouring mosques. In the 19th century, several new churches were built, including the Church of the Nativity of the Virgin Mary, which is a large three-nave building designed by Andrey Damyanov.

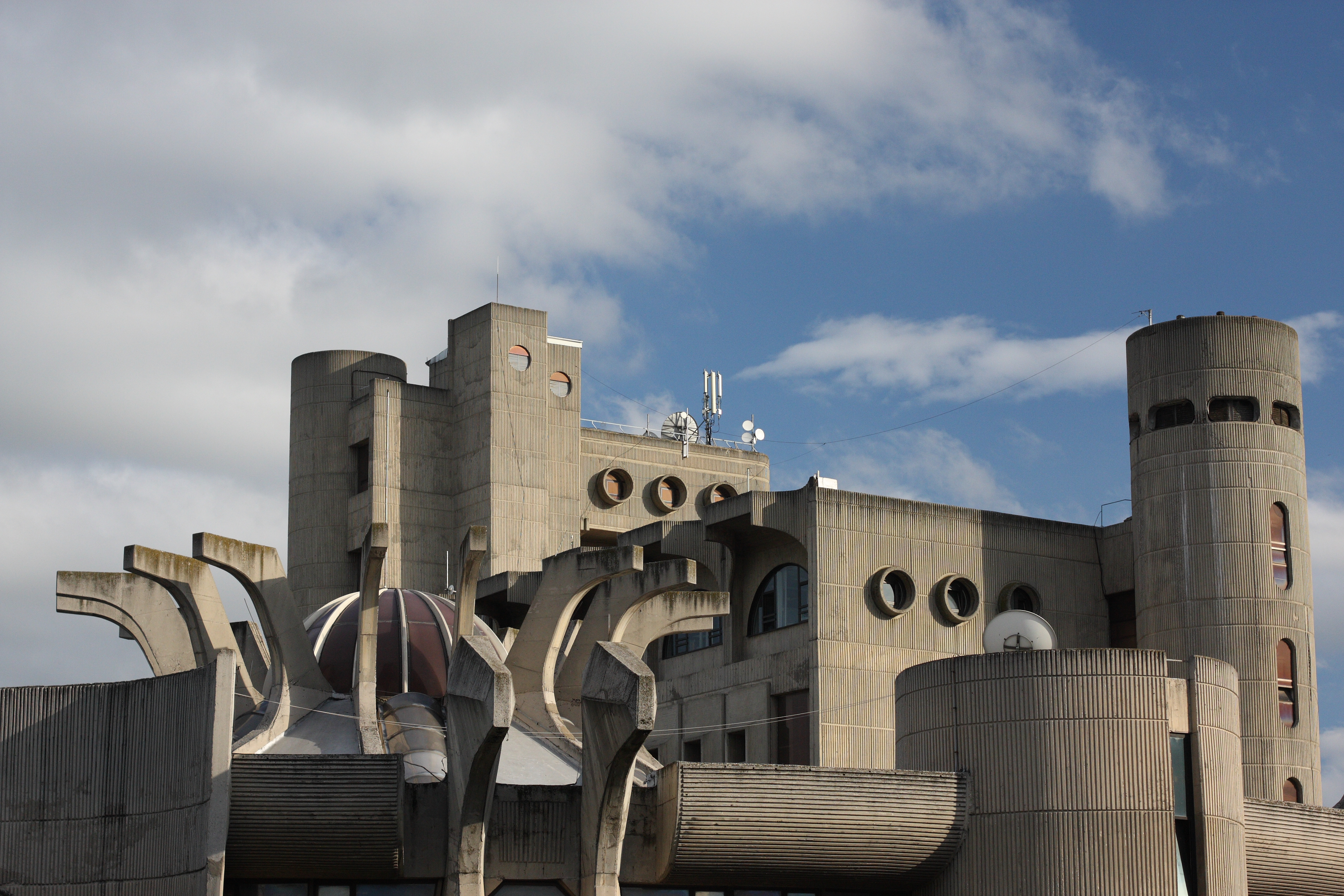
Main post office and the Communication Centre

After 1912, when Skopje was annexed by Serbia, the city was drastically westernised. Wealthy Serbs built mansions and town houses such as the 1926 Ristiḱ Palace. The architecture of that time is very similar to the one of Central Europe, but some buildings are more creative, such as the Neo-Moorish Arab House and the Neo-Byzantine railway station, both built in 1938. Modernism appeared as early as 1933 with the former Ethnographic Museum (today the City Gallery), designed by Milan Zloković. However, modernist architecture only fully developed in Skopje after the 1963 earthquake. The reconstruction of the city centre was partially planned by Japanese Kenzo Tange who designed the new railway station. Macedonian architects also took part in the reconstruction: Georgi Konstantinovski designed the City Archives building in 1968 and the Hall of residence Goce Delčev in 1975, whilst Janko Konstantinov designed the Telecommunication Centre and the main post office (1974–1989). Slavko Brezovski designed the Church of St. Clement of Ohrid. These two buildings are noted for their originality although they are directly inspired by brutalism.

The reconstruction turned Skopje into a proper modernist city, with large blocks of flats, austere concrete buildings and scattered green spaces. The city centre was considered as a grey and unattractive place when local authorities unveiled the Skopje 2014 project in 2010. It made plans to erect a large number of statues, fountains, bridges, and museums at a cost of about €500 million.

The project has generated controversy: critics have described the new landmark buildings as signs of reactionary historicist aesthetics. Also, the government has been criticised for its cost and the original lack of representation of national minorities in the coverage of its set of statues and memorials. However, representations of minorities have since been included amongst the monuments. The scheme is accused of turning Skopje to a theme park, which is viewed as nationalistic kitsch, and has made Skopje an example to see how national identities are constructed and how this construction is mirrored in the urban space.

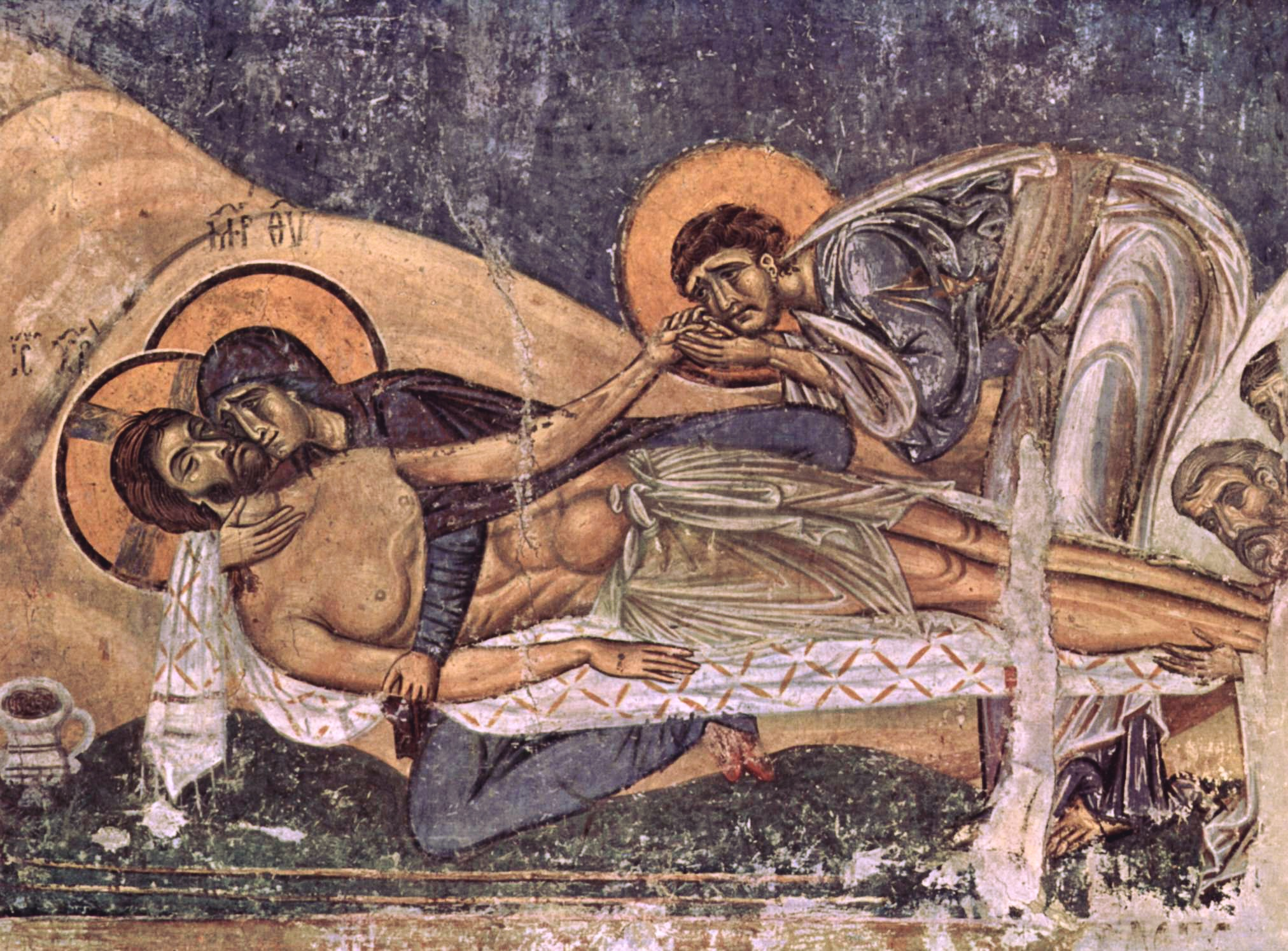
Fresco in the Church of Saint Panteleimon

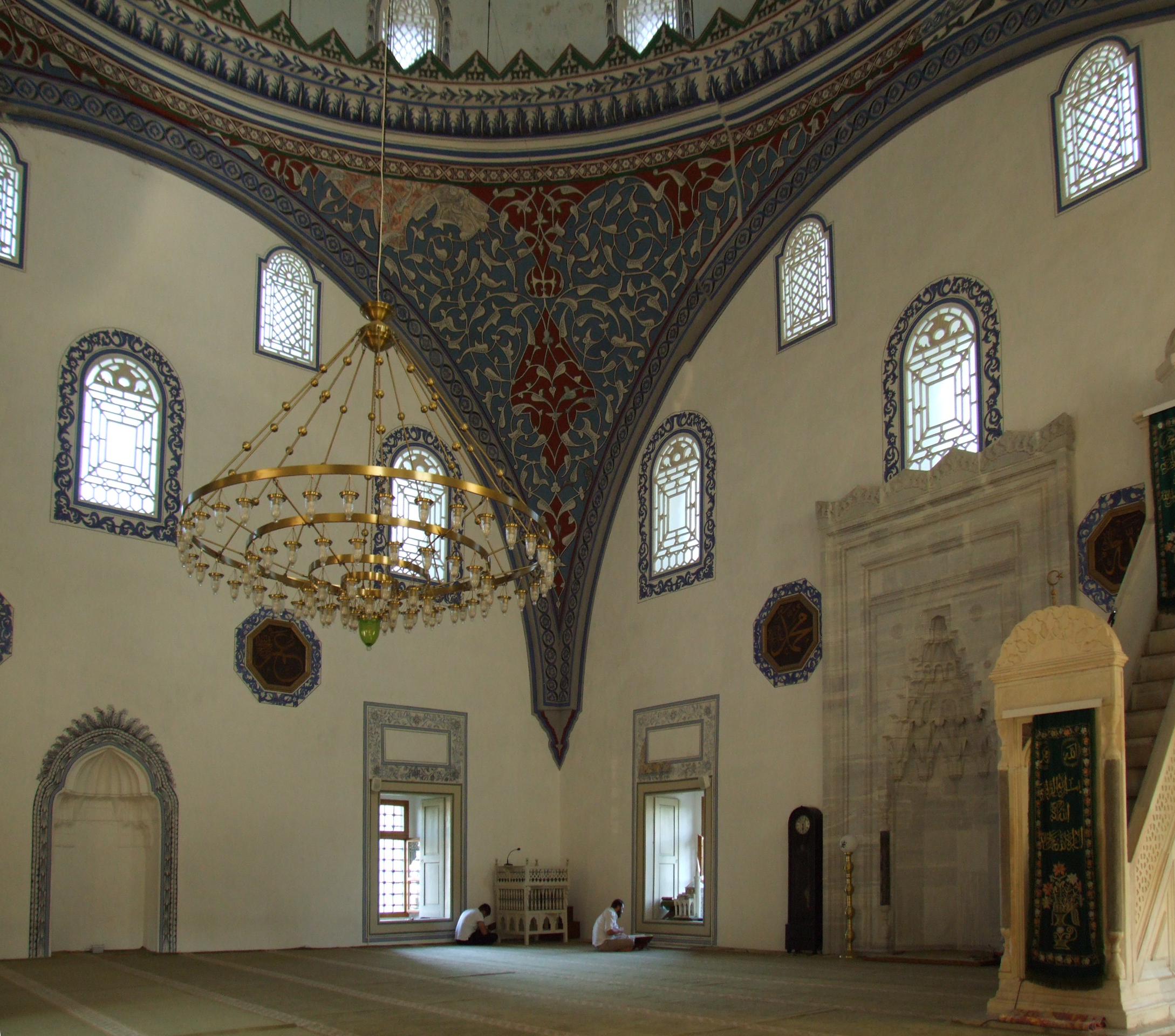
Interior of Mustafa Pasha Mosque

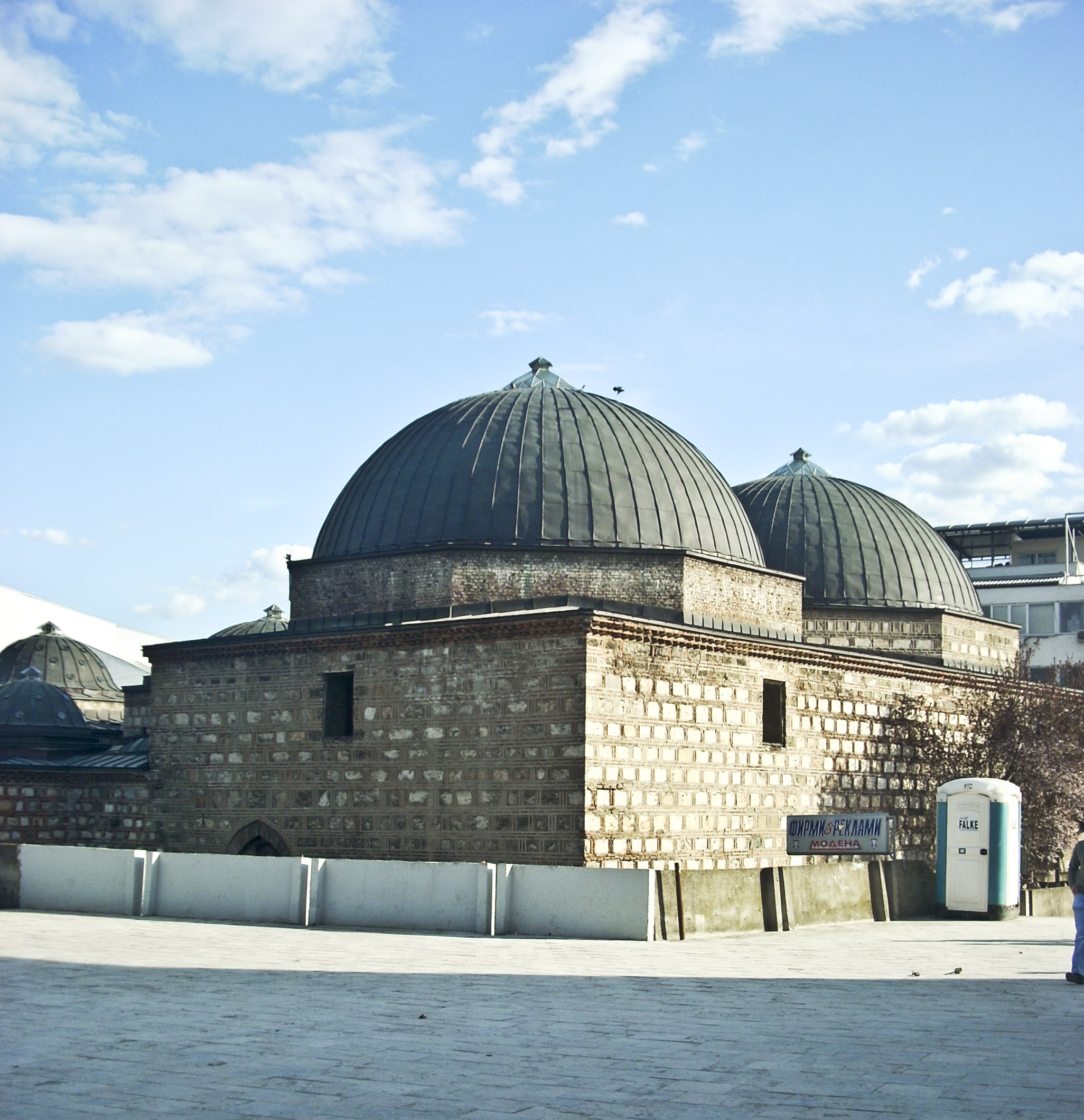
Daut Pasha Hammam

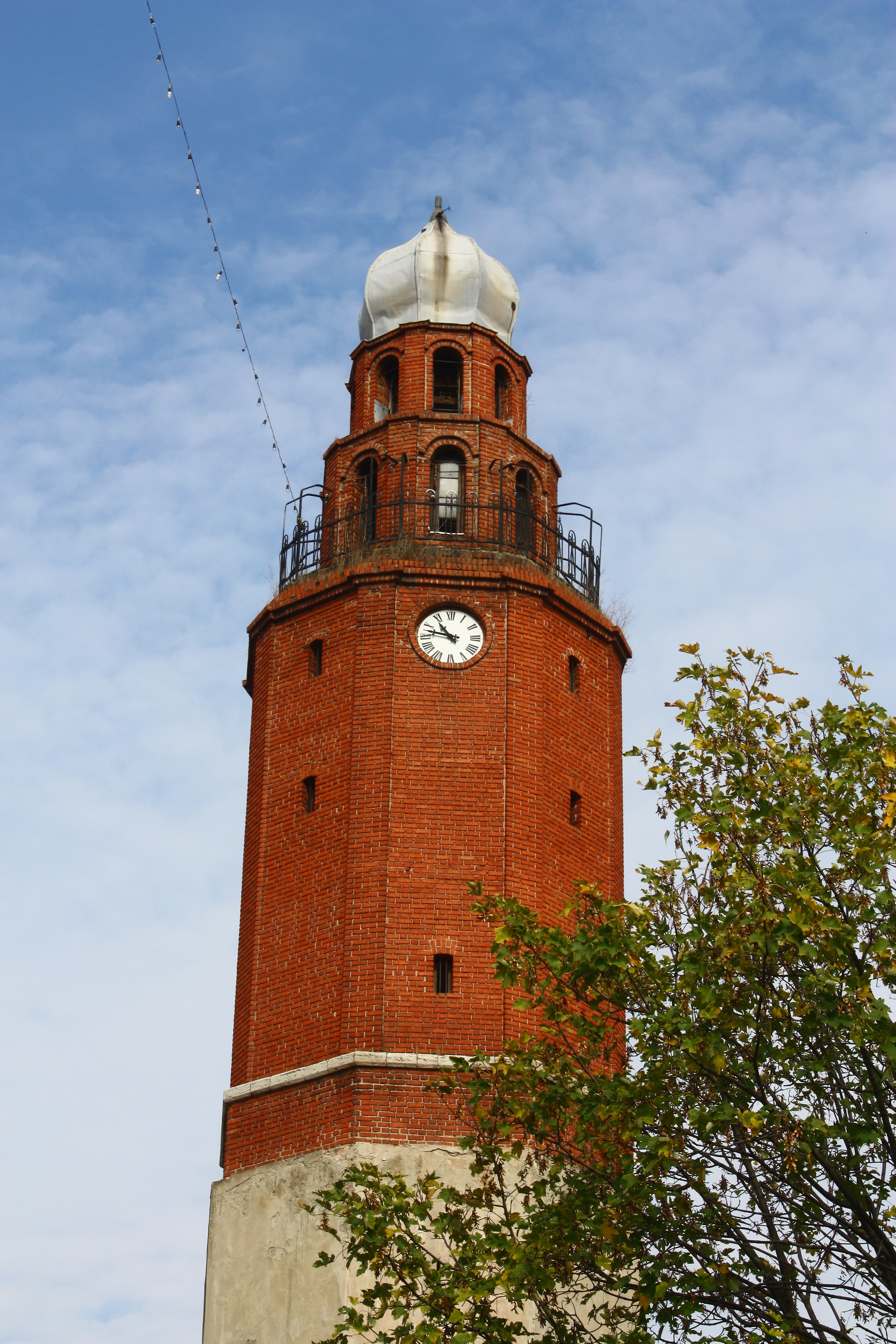
The historic clock tower

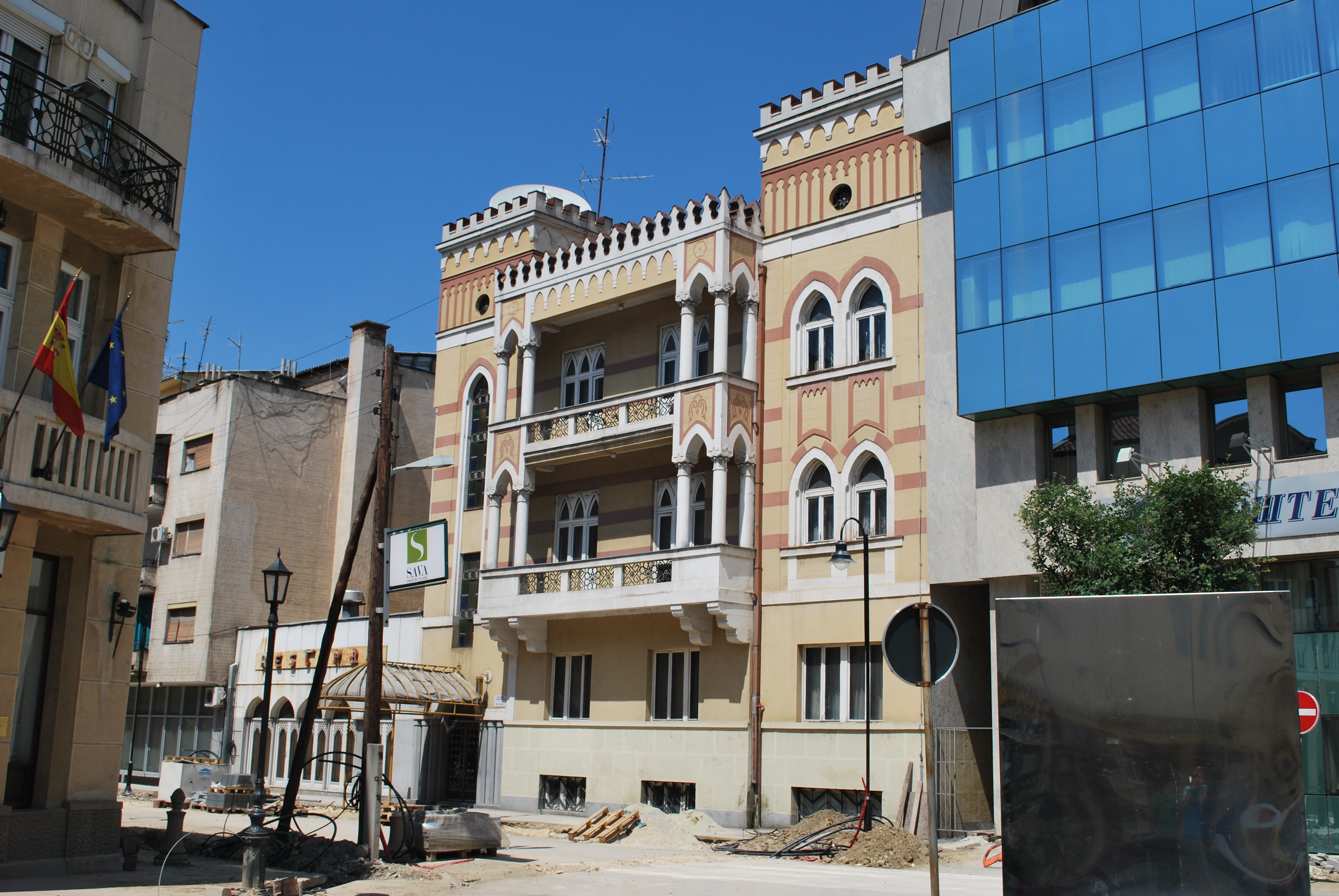
The Arab House

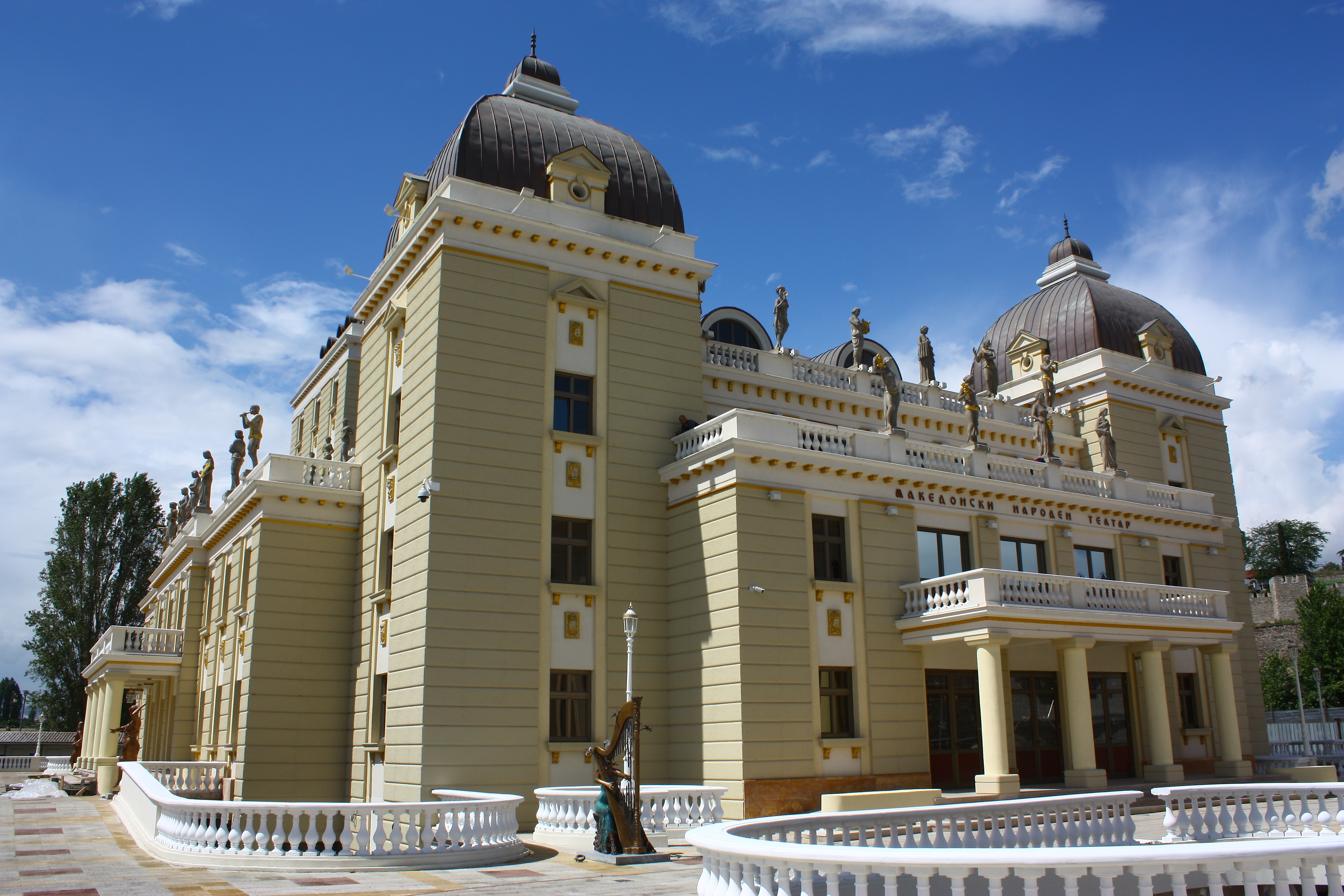
Macedonian National Theater

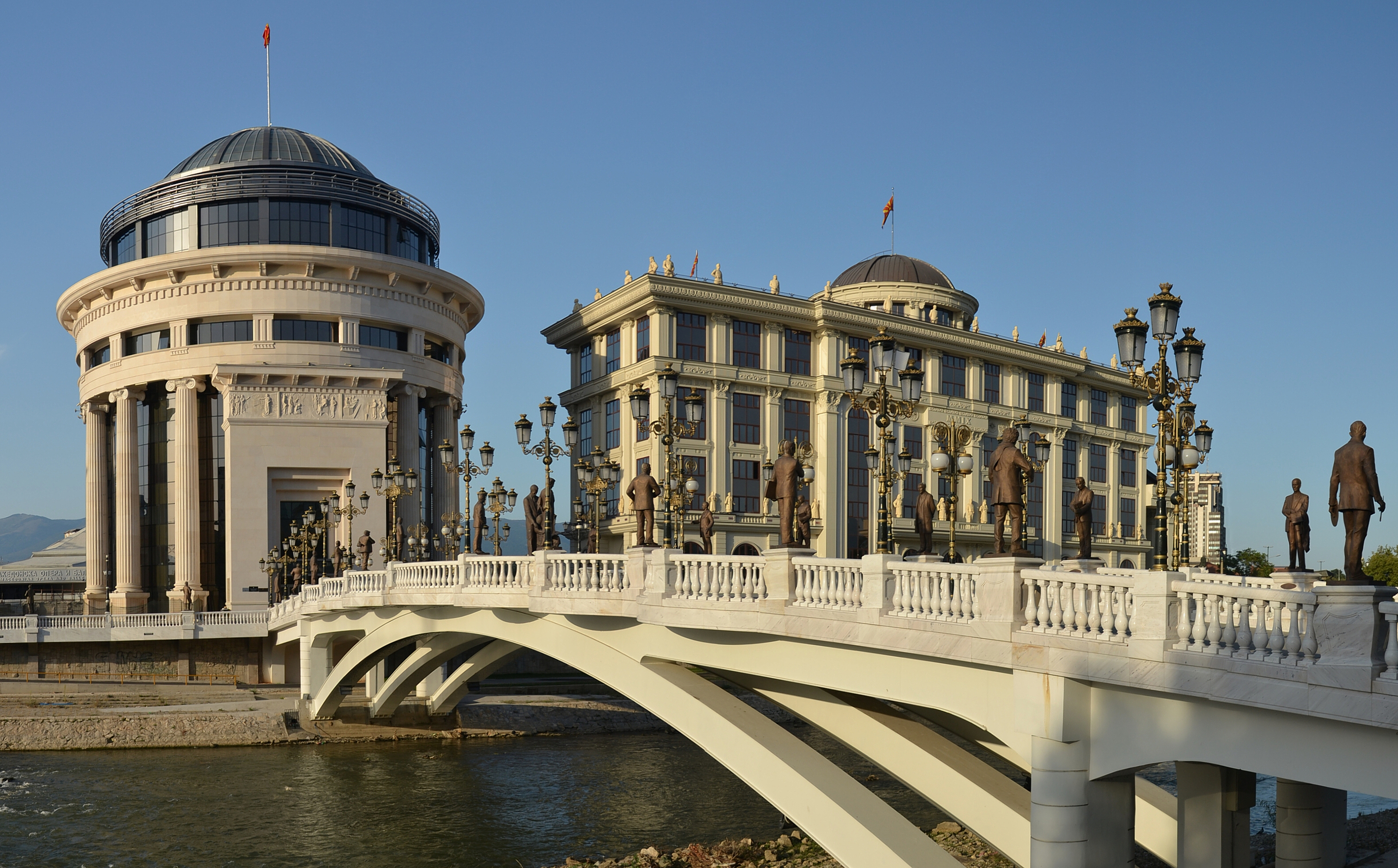
Art Bridge

=== Festivals ===
The Skopje Jazz Festival has been held annually in October since 1981. It is part of the European Jazz Network and the European Forum of World Wide Festivals. The artists' profiles include fusion, acid jazz, Latin jazz, smooth jazz, and avant-garde jazz. Ray Charles, Tito Puente, Gotan Project, Al Di Meola, Youssou N'Dour, amongst others, have performed at the festival. Another music festival in Skopje is the Blues and Soul Festival. It is a relatively new event in the Macedonian cultural scene that occurs every summer in early July. Past guests include Larry Coryell, Mick Taylor & the All-Stars Blues Band, Candy Dulfer & Funky Stuff, João Bosco, the Temptations, Tolo Marton Trio, Blues Wire, and Phil Guy.

The Skopje Cultural Summer Festival is a cultural event that takes place in Skopje each year during the summer. The festival is a member of the International Festivals and Events Association (IFEA) and it includes musical concerts, operas, ballets, plays, art and photograph exhibitions, films, and multimedia projects that gather 2,000 participants from around the world each year including the St Petersburg Theatre, the Chamber Orchestra of the Bolshoi Theatre, Irina Arkhipova, Viktor Tretiakov, The Theatre of Shadows, Michel Dalberto, and David Burgess.

May Opera Evenings is a festival that has occurred annually in Skopje since 1972 and is dedicated to promoting opera amongst the general public. Over the years, it has evolved into a stage on which artists from some 50 countries have performed. There is one other major international theatre festival that takes place each year at the end of September, the Young Open Theater Festival (MOT), which was organised for the first time in May 1976 by the Youth Cultural Center – Skopje. More than 700 theatrical performances have been presented at this festival so far, most of them being alternative, experimental theatre groups engaging young writers and actors. The MOT International Theatre Festival is also a member of the International Network for Contemporary Performing Arts or IETM. Within the framework of the MOT Festival, the Macedonian National Center of the International Theater Institute (ITI) was established, and at the 25th ITI World Congress in Munich in 1993, it became a regular member of this theatre association.

The Skopje Film Festival is an annual event held in the city every March. Over 50 films are shown at this five-day festival, mostly from North Macedonia and Europe, but also including some non-commercial film productions from all over the world.

=== Nightlife ===
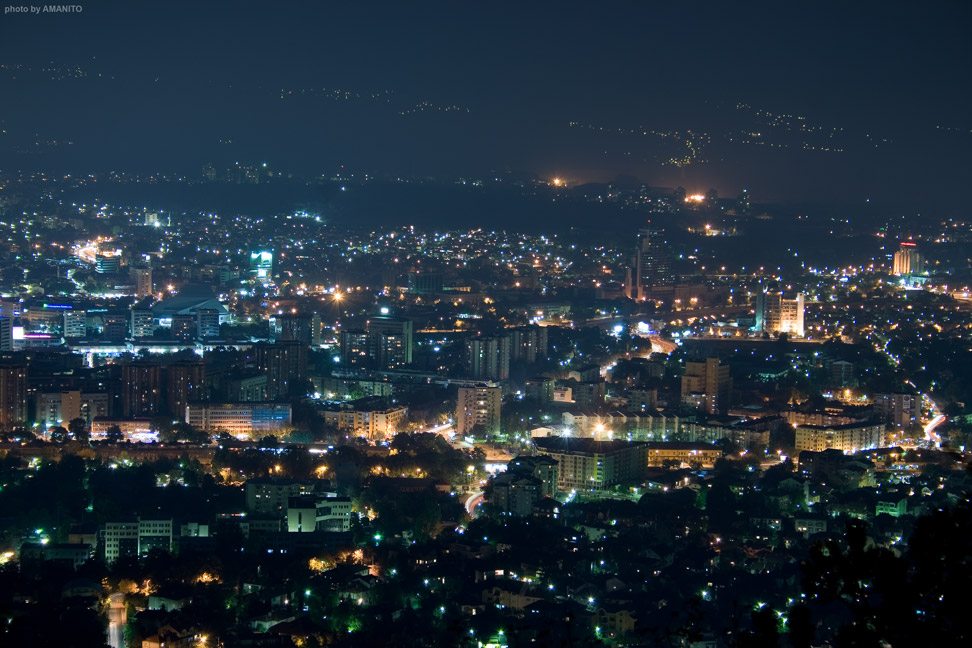
Panorama of Skopje at night

Skopje has a diverse nightlife. There is a large emphasis on casinos, many of which are associated with hotels. In 2010, the Colosseum club was named fifth on a list of the best clubs in South-eastern Europe. Armin van Buuren, Above and Beyond, The Shapeshifters are just some of the many musicians that have visited the club. Nighttime concerts in local, regional and global music are often held at the Toše Proeski Arena and Boris Trajkovski Sports Center. For middle-aged people, places for having fun are also the kafeanas where traditional Macedonian food is served and traditional Macedonian music (Starogradska muzika) is played, but music from all the Balkans, particularly Serbian folk music is also popular. Apart from the traditional Macedonian restaurants, there are restaurants featuring international cuisines. The Old Bazaar was a popular nightlife destination in the past. The national government has created a project to revive nightlife in the Old Bazaar. The closing time in shops, cafés and restaurants was extended due to the high attendances recorded. In the bazaar's restaurants, along with the traditional Macedonian wine and food, dishes of the Ottoman cuisine are also served.

== International relations ==
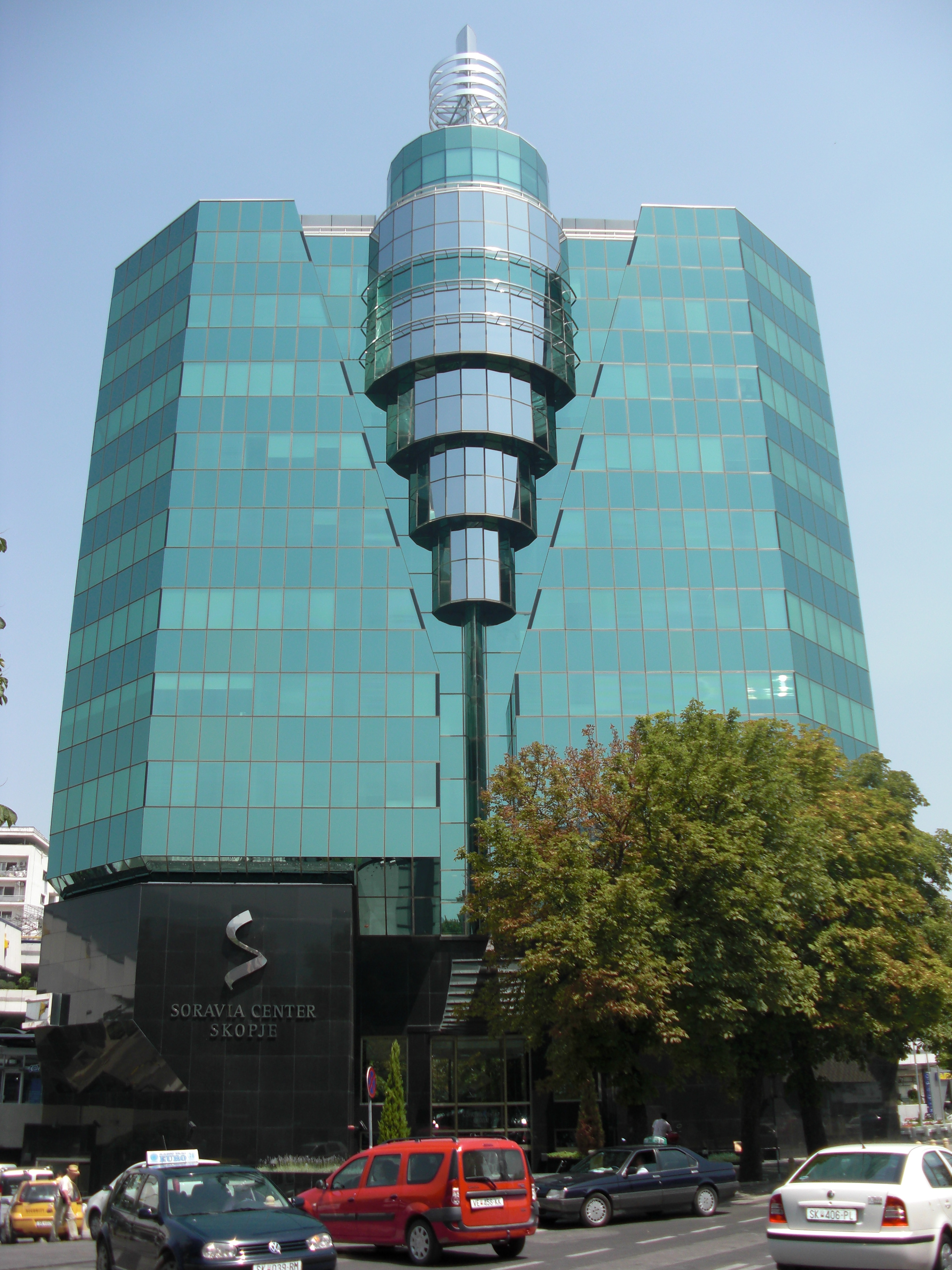
Soravia Center Skopje

=== Twin towns – sister cities ===
Skopje is twinned with:

- Bradford, United Kingdom (since 1961)
- Dijon, France (since 1961)
- Dresden, Germany (since 1967)
- Tempe, United States (since 1971)
- Roubaix, France (since 1973)
- Waremme, Belgium (since 1974)
- Nuremberg, Germany (since 1982)
- Chlef, Algeria (since 1983)
- Nanchang, China (since 1985)
- Manisa, Turkey (since 1985)
- Suez, Egypt (since 1985)
- Pittsburgh, United States (since 2002)
- Istanbul, Turkey (since 2003)
- Ljubljana, Slovenia (since 2007)
- Podgorica, Montenegro (since 2007)
- Zaragoza, Spain (since 2008)
- Zagreb, Croatia (since 2011)
- Tirana, Albania (since 2016)
- Sarajevo, Bosnia and Herzegovina (since 2017)

=== Partnerships ===
- Ankara, Turkey (since 1995)
- Belgrade, Serbia (since 2012)

== See also ==
- History of Skopje
- List of honorary citizens of Skopje
- List of people from Skopje
- Old Bazaar, Skopje
- Sports in Skopje

== General sources ==
- Iseni, Bashkim (2008). La question nationale en Europe du Sud-Est: genèse, émergence et développement de l'indentité nationale albanaise au Kosovo et en Macédoine. Peter Lang. p. 113. ISBN 9783039113200.
- Ramet, Sabrina P. (2006). The Three Yugoslavias: State-Building and Legitimation, 1918–2005. Indiana University Press. ISBN 9780253346568.
- Duridanov, Ivan (1975). Die Hydronymie des Vardarsystems als Geschichtsquelle (PDF). Böhlau Verlag. ISBN 3412839736.
- Fine, John Van Antwerp (1994). The Late Medieval Balkans: A Critical Survey from the Late Twelfth Century to the Ottoman Conquest. University of Michigan Press. ISBN 978-0-472-08260-5.
- Papazoglu, Fanula (1978). The Central Balkan Tribes in pre-Roman Times: Triballi, Autariatae, Dardanians, Scordisci and Moesians. Amsterdam: Hakkert. ISBN 9789025607937.
- Rossos, Andrew (2008). Macedonia and the Macedonians: A History. Hoover Press. ISBN 978-0-8179-4882-5.
- Herold, Stephanie; Langer, Benjamin & Lechler, Julia (2010). Reading the city: Urban Space and Memory in Skopje. Universitätsverlag der Technischen Universität Berlin. ISBN 9783798321298.
