= Timeline of Skopje =

The following is a timeline of the history of the city of Skopje, North Macedonia. (Note: The city of Skopje has been known by several names: Iskubia, Scopia, Scupi, Skopia, Skopie, Skopje, Skoplje, Skoplye, Uscub, Uscup, Ushküp, Uskiup, Üsküb, Usküp. See also: Other names of Skopje.)

== Prior to 20th century ==
- 6th C. CE - Skopje Fortress built.
- 518 CE - Earthquake.
- 6th C. CE - Town rebuilt; called "Justiniana Prima."
- 585-837 C. CE - Slavs in power.
- 837-1282 C. CE - Lot of Bulgarian rulers are missing. The city was capital of Bulgaria. Byzantine rule is missing. The city was capital of a Byzantine province called Bulgaria?!?
- 1282 - Serbs in power.
- 1346
  - Coronation of Stephen Uroš IV Dušan as Emperor of the Serbs of the Church-People's Council in Skopje.
  - Town becomes capital of the Serbian Empire.
  - Marko's Monastery established near town.
- 1366 - Serbian Vukašin Mrnjavčević in power.
- 1391 - Ottomans in power; town renamed "Üsküp" and becomes capital of the Ottoman Sanjak of Üsküb.
- 1392 - Pasha Yigit-Beg becomes governor of the Sanjak of Üsküb.
- 1415 - Ishak Bey becomes governor of the Sanjak of Üsküb.
- 1436 - Sultan Murad Mosque built.
- 1443 - Islamic library established.
- 1454 - Isa-Beg Isaković becomes governor of the Sanjak of Üsküb.
- 1465 - Madrasa of Ishak Beg established.
- 1467 - Kapan Han (caravanserai) active (approximate date).
- 1469 - Stone Bridge built.
- 1476 - Mosque of Isa Bey built.
- 1485 - Kodja Mustafa mosque built.
- 1492 - Mustafa Pasha Mosque built in the bazaar.
- 1495 - Karlozade mosque built.
- 1503 - Mosque of Yahya Pasha built.
- 1519 - Aladja Mosque built.
- 1555 - 1555 Skopje earthquake
- 1569 - Population: 10,525.
- 1572 - Political unrest.
- 1584 - Political unrest.
- 1595 - Political unrest.
- 1661 - Traveller Evliya Çelebi visits town.
- 1689 - October: Fire of Skopje 1689.
- 1803 - Mosque of Murat Pasha built.
- 1868 - Town becomes part of the Ottoman Prizren Vilayet.
- 1873 - Thessaloniki–Skopje railway begins operating.
- 1875 - Seat of the Prizren Vilayet relocated to Uskub from Pristina.
- 1877 - Town becomes part of the Ottoman Kosovo Vilayet.
- 1882 - Population: 34,152.
- 1888 - Belgrad-Nish-Skoplye railway begins operating.

== 20th century ==
- 1905 - Population: about 32,000.
- 1912
  - August: Albanians in power.
  - Spiro Hadzhi Ristic becomes mayor.
- 1913 - Serbs in power per Treaty of London.
- 1918 - Town becomes part of Kingdom of Serbs, Croats and Slovenes.
- 1921 - Population: 32,249.
- 1926 - Skopje Zoo opens.
- 1928 - Skopje International Airport opens
- 1929 - Josif Mihajlović becomes mayor.
- 1931 - Population: 64,807.
- 1936 - Freedom Bridge built.
- 1941
  - April: City taken by German forces.
  - Spiro Kitinchev becomes mayor.
- 1944
  - November 13 - Bulgarian Army captured the city, ejecting the Germans.
  - Nova Makedonija newspaper begins publication.
  - Public hospital established.
  - Lazar Tanev becomes mayor.
- 1945 - City becomes capital of the Socialist Republic of Macedonia of Yugoslavia.
- 1946
  - Saints Cyril and Methodius University of Skopje established.
  - Association of Journalists of Macedonia headquartered in city.
- 1947 - City Stadium of Skopje opens.
- 1949
  - City becomes capital of Skoplje Oblast.
  - Museum of the City of Skopje founded in a former railway station.
  - Ss. Cyril and Methodius University of Skopje founded.
- 1953 - Population: 121,551.
- 1963
  - 26 July: 1963 Skopje earthquake.
  - Revolution Bridge built.
  - Contemporary Art Museum of Macedonia founded.
- 1967 - Macedonian Academy of Sciences and Arts headquartered in city.
- 1974 - Metodi Antonov becomes mayor.
- 1976 - City administration organized into five municipalities: Čair, Centar, Gazi Baba, Karpoš, and Kisela Voda.
- 1977 - Cathedral of the Sacred Heart of Jesus founded.
- 1978 - Tumba Madžari archaeological excavations begin.
- 1981
  - Transportation Center Skopje rebuilding completed.
  - Population: 408,143.
- 1984 - Macedonian Radio-Television Center built.
- 1986 - Jugoslav Todorovski becomes mayor.
- 1990 - Church of St. Clement of Ohrid consecrated.
- 1991 - Milan Talevski becomes mayor.
- 1992 - July: Political demonstration.
- 1993
  - City becomes capital of the Republic of Macedonia.
  - Library of Islamic Culture built.
  - United States Army Camp Able Sentry established near city.
- 1995 - Macedonian Stock Exchange established.
- 1996
  - City administration organized into seven municipalities: Čair, Centar, Gazi Baba, Gjorče Petrov, Karpoš, Kisela Voda, Šuto Orizari.
  - Yahya Kemal College established.
  - Risto Penov becomes mayor.
- 1997 - Center for Strategic Research and Documentation founded.
- 1998 - Albanian demonstration.
- 1999 - Euro-Balkan Institute headquartered in city.

== 21st century ==
- 2001
  - May: Political unrest.
  - June: Anti-NATO demonstration.
  - July: Anti-NATO demonstration.
  - August: Protest against Ohrid Agreement.
- 2002
  - May: Labour unrest.
  - Population: 506,926; metro 668,518.
- 2004
  - City administration organized into ten municipalities: Aerodrom, Butel, Čair, Centar, Gazi Baba, Ǵorče Petrov, Karpoš, Kisela Voda, Saraj, Šuto Orizari.
  - Press to Exit project space established.
- 2005
  - Dance Fest Skopje begins.
  - Trifun Kostovski becomes mayor.
- 2009
  - Memorial House of Mother Teresa opens.
  - Koce Trajanovski becomes mayor.
- 2010 - Skopje 2014 construction project announced.
- 2011
  - Skopje Airport new terminal and Museum of the Macedonian Struggle open.
  - Millennium Cross Cable Car begins operating.
  - Statue of Alexander the Great unveiled in Macedonia Square.
  - Cevahir Towers construction begins.
- 2012 - March: Ethnic unrest.
- 2013
  - March: Ethnic unrest.
  - Air pollution in Skopje reaches annual mean of 45 PM2.5 and 74 PM10, more than recommended.
- 2014 - Skopje 2014 extensive re-building project.
- 2016
  - 2016 Macedonian protests.
  - 2016 Macedonian floods

== See also ==
- History of Skopje
- List of mayors of Skopje

== Bibliography ==
- Edward Brown (1673). "Skopia". A Brief Account of Some Travels in Hungaria, Servia, Bulgaria, Macedonia, Thessaly, Austria, Styria, Carinthia, Carniola, and Friuli. London: Benj. Tooke.
- A.J. Evans (1885), "Scupi, Skopia, and the Birthplace of Justinian", Antiquarian Researches in Illyricum, vol. 3–4, England: Nichols & Sons, pp. 79–152, hdl:2027/pst.000006247065
- "Usküb" . Encyclopædia Britannica. Vol. 27 (11th ed.). 1910. p. 811.
- Anthony Lawrence Gancevic (1913). "Archdiocese of Scopia". Catholic Encyclopedia. New York.
- Fehim Bajraktarević (1936). "Üsküb". Encyclopaedia of Islam. E.J. Brill. p. 1052+. ISBN 9789004097940.
- Randall J. Van Vynckt (1996). "Skopje". In Trudy Ring (ed.). Southern Europe. International Dictionary of Historic Places. Vol. 3. Fitzroy Dearborn. OCLC 31045650.
- S. Bouzarovski (2011). "Skopje" (PDF). Cities. 28 (3): 265–277. doi:10.1016/j.cities.2010.05.002.
- Roman A. Cybriwsky (2013). "Skopje". Capital Cities around the World: An Encyclopedia of Geography, History, and Culture. ABC-CLIO. p. 281+. ISBN 978-1-61069-248-9.
