= History of Skopje =

The history of Skopje, North Macedonia, goes back to at least 4000 BC; remains of Neolithic settlements have been found within the old Kale Fortress that overlooks the modern city centre. The settlement appears to have been founded around then by the Paionians, a people that inhabited the region. It became the capital of Dardania, which extended from Naissus to Bylazora in the second century BC. Roman expansion east brought Scupi under Roman rule on the eve of the 1st century AD. When the Roman Empire was divided into eastern and western halves in 395 AD, Scupi came under Byzantine rule from Constantinople. During much of the early medieval period, the town was contested between the Byzantines and the Bulgarian Empire. It served as Bulgarian capital from 972 to 992. After 1018, it was a capital of Byzantine theme of Bulgaria after the fall the First Bulgarian Empire. In 1189 the town was part of the Serbian realm later becoming the capital of the Serbian Empire. In 1392 the city was conquered by the Ottoman Turks and they named the town Üsküb. The town stayed under Ottoman rule for over 500 years. During that period it was famous for its oriental architecture.

In 1913, after the Balkan Wars, Skopje became part of Kingdom of Serbia, and after the First World War the city became part of the newly formed Kingdom of Serbs, Croats and Slovenes (Kingdom of Yugoslavia). In the Second World War the city was conquered by the Bulgarian Army, which was collaborating with the Nazi Germans. In 1944 it became the capital city of Democratic Macedonia (later Socialist Republic of Macedonia), which was a federal state, part of Democratic Federal Yugoslavia (later Socialist Federal Republic of Yugoslavia). The city developed rapidly after World War II, but this trend was interrupted in 1963 when it was hit by a disastrous earthquake. In 1991 it became the capital centre of independent Macedonia.

Skopje was the birthplace of the noted missionary Religious Sister, Mother Teresa of Calcutta.

== Early phase ==
Scupi was quickly gained by the Romans and remains faithful to the decline of the Empire. Roman Republic Roman Empire Western Roman Empire Eastern Roman Empire

The site of modern Skopje has been inhabited since at least 4000 BC by the local Pelasgian tribes.; remains of Neolithic settlements have been found within the old Kale fortress that overlooks the modern city centre. The earliest people in Skopje Valley were probably the Triballi, a Thracian tribe that received influences from Celts, Scythians and Illyrians. Later the area was populated by the Paionians, but in the 3rd century BC, Skopje and the surrounding area was invaded by the Dardanians. Scupi, the ancient name for Skopje, became the capital of Dardania, which extended from Naissus to Bylazora in the second century BC. Roman expansion east brought Scupi under Roman rule on the eve of the 1st century AD, but several legions from the Roman province of Macedonia from the Crassus' army of 29-28 BC, may already have been stationed there, before the official imperial command in this area was instituted. Short afterwards it became part of the province of Moesia during Augustus's rule. Most probably Scupi was founded as war camp, which became a town with a status of colony. The northward expansion of the empire in the course of the 1st century BC lead to the creation of the province of Moesia in Augustus's times, into which Scupi was incorporated. After the division of the province by Domitian in 86 AD, Scupi was elevated to colonia status, and became a seat of government within the new province of Moesia superior. The district called Dardania (in Moesia Superior), was formed into a special province by Diocletian, with the capital at Naissus. From 395 AD, it passed into the hands of the Eastern Roman (or Byzantine) Empire.

The first known bishop of the city is Perigorius, present at the Council of Sardica (343). Scupi was probably a metropolitan see about the middle of the 5th century (Latin: Archidioecesis Scopiensis).

== Medieval era ==
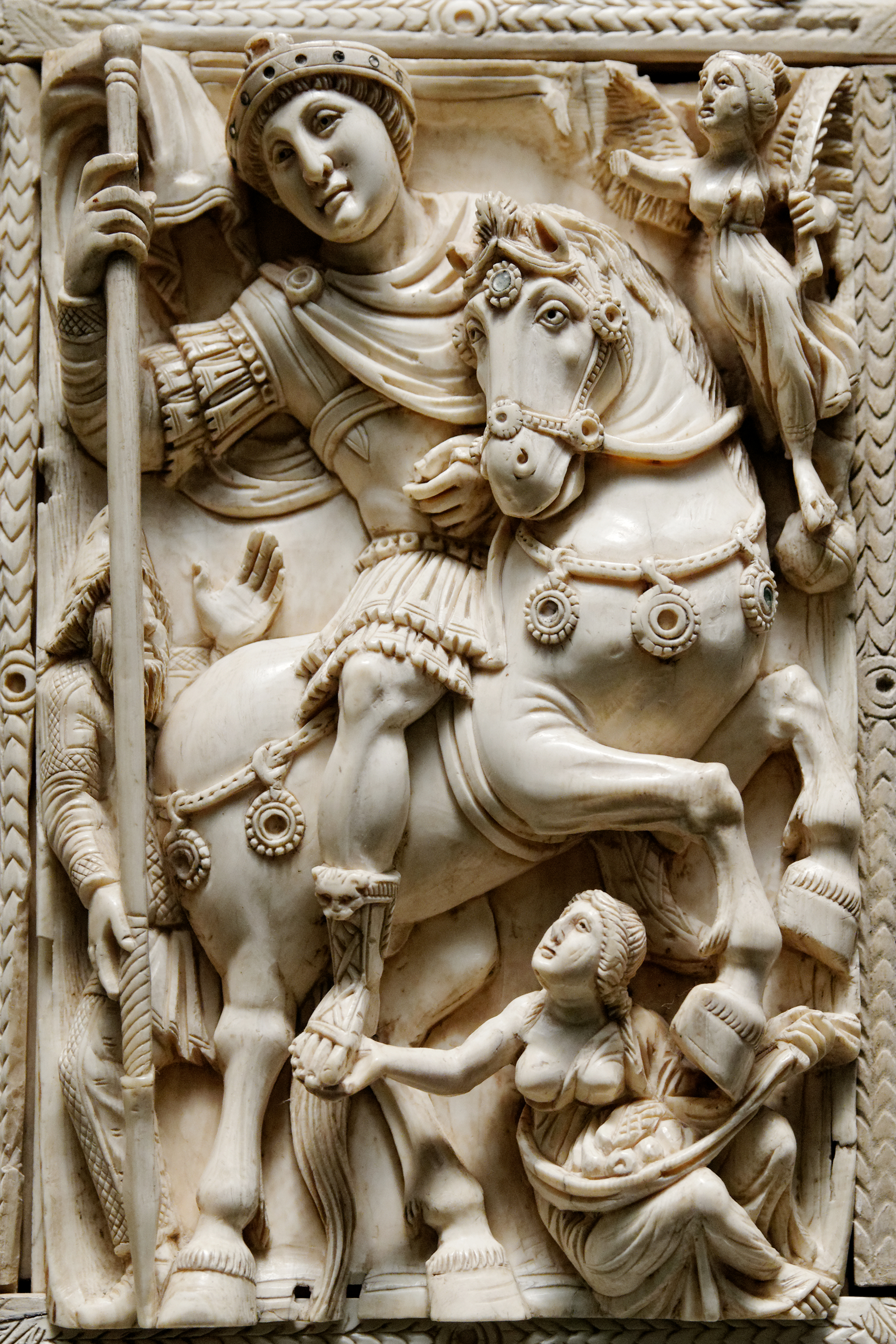
A relief of the Byzantine Emperor Justinian I.

When the Roman Empire was divided into eastern and western halves in AD 395, Scupi came under Byzantine rule from Constantinople and became an important trading and garrison town for the region. The Byzantine Emperor Justinian (AD 527–65) was born in Tauresium (about 20 km southeast of present-day Skopje) in AD 483, and after Scupi was almost completely destroyed by an earthquake in AD 518. Justinian built a new town at the fertile entry point of the River Lepenec into the Vardar. Some historians believe this might be the city of Justiniana Prima. During much of the early medieval period, the town was contested between the Byzantines and the Bulgarian Empire. From 972 to 992 it was the capital of the First Bulgarian Empire. It was a capital of Byzantine administrative region (katepanat) Bulgaria after the fall the First Bulgarian Empire in 1018. Scupi was a thriving trading settlement but fell into decline after being hit by another devastating earthquake at the end of the 11th century. In 1189 the town was part of the Serbian realm.

It was a capital of the estate of the Bulgarian feudal lord, later Emperor Konstantin Asen in the middle of the 13th century. The Byzantine Empire took advantage of the decline in Skopje to regain influence in the area, but lost control of it once again in 1282 to King Stefan Uroš II Milutin of Serbia. Milutin's grandson, Stefan Dušan, made Skopje his capital, from which he was proclaimed Tsar in 1346, subsequently making it the capital of the Serbian Empire. After his sudden death in 1355, he was succeeded by Stephen Uroš V of Serbia who could not keep Serbian Empire together and it was fragmented in many small principalities with Vuk Branković last Serbian and Christian prince that had Skopje under control during medieval period until it fell under Ottoman Control in 1392, for the next 520 years.

== Ottoman era ==
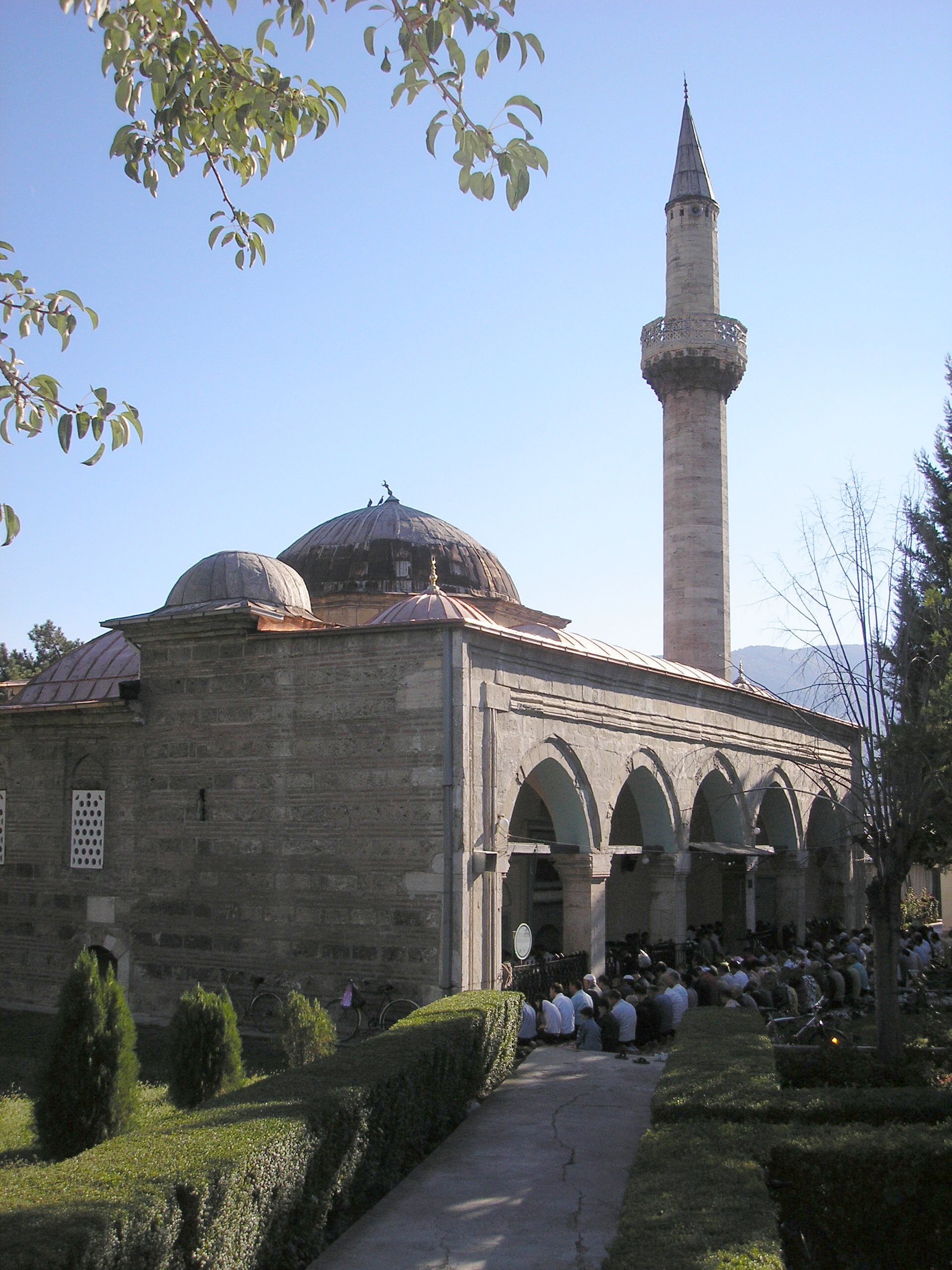
Ishak Bey Mosque.

Rolling back Byzantine rule across much of the Balkans, the Ottoman Turks finally conquered Skopje in 1392 beginning a 520 years period of Ottoman rule. The Ottomans pronounced the town Üsküb and named it as such. At first the Ottomans divided the greater Macedonian region into three vilayets, or districts — Üsküb (Kosovo), Manastir and Selanik – and as the northernmost of these, Üsküb was strategically important for further forays into central Europe.

Under Ottoman rule the town moved further towards the entry point of the River Serava into the Vardar. Also the architecture of the town was changed accordingly. During the 15th century, many travelers' inns were established in the town, such as Kapan An and Suli An, which still exist today. The city's famous Stone Bridge (Kameni Most) – was also reconstructed during this period and the famous Daud Pasha baths (now a modern art gallery) was built at the end of the 15th century. At this time numerous Spanish Sephardic Jews driven out of Spain settled in Üsküb, adding to the cultural mix of the town and enhancing the town's trading reputation.

At the beginning of Ottoman rule, several mosques sprang up in the city, and church lands were often seized and given to ex-soldiers, while many churches themselves were converted over time into mosques. The most impressive mosques erected during this early period include the Sultan Murat or Hjunkar Mosque, Aladza Mosque and the Mustafa Pasha Mosque. In 1555, another earthquake hit the town, destroying much of the centre. The outskirts survived and the town continued, nonetheless, to prosper with traders and travelers. Travel reports from the era number Üsküb's population anywhere between 30,000 and 60,000 inhabitants. Üsküb was briefly occupied in 1689 by the Austrian General Piccolomini. He and his troops did not stay for long, however, as the town was quickly engulfed by the plague. On retreating from the town Piceolomini's troops set fire to Üsküb, perhaps in order to stamp out the plague, although some say this was done in order to avenge the 1683 Ottoman siege of Vienna.

For the next two centuries Üsküb's prestige waned and by the 19th century its population had dwindled to a mere 10,000. In 1873, however, the completion of the Üsküb—Selanik (now Skopje—Thessaloniki) railway brought many more travellers and traders to the town, so that by around the start of the 20th century Üsküb had regained its former numbers of around 30,000. Towards the end of the Ottoman Empire, Üsküb, along with other towns in Macedonia – Krusevo and Manastir (now Bitola) – became main hubs of rebellious movements against Ottoman rule. Üsküb was a key player in the Ilinden Uprising of August 1903 when the native population of the region declared the emergence of the Krusevo Republic. While the Krusevo Republic lasted only ten days before being quelled by the Ottomans, it was a sign of the beginning of the end for Ottoman rule. After 500 years of rule in the area the Ottomans were finally ousted in 1912 by the Serbian army during the first Balkan War.

== Balkan and World Wars ==
Albanian irregulars at Skopje's train station after capturing the city in August 1912

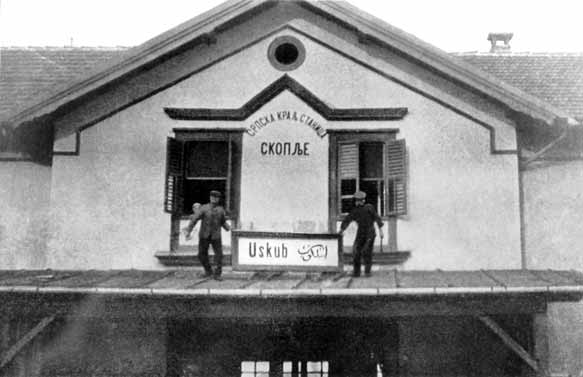
Change of city name from Üsküb to Skoplje in 1912.

As the administrative centre of the region, Üsküb also administered the vilayet of Kossovo under Ottoman rule. That did not go down well with the increasingly Albanian population of Kosovo who preferred to be ruled by Albanians rather than the Turks (whereas Kosovo Serbs sought to join the Kingdom of Serbia). During the Albanian revolt of 1912, the Ottomans were shortly expelled from the city during August 12–15, 1912 by the local Albanian population when 15,000 Albanians marched on and captured Üsküb.

The Turks, already weak from other battles against the united front of Greece, Serbia and Bulgaria during the First Balkan War, started to flee.

When reinforcements to the Serbian Royal Army arrived some weeks later during the Battle of Kumanovo (50 km northeast of Skopje) it proved decisive in firmly driving out the Ottomans from all of Macedonia. Skopje remained occupied by the Kingdom of Serbia during the Second Balkan War of 1913 when the formerly united front started to fight amongst themselves. Treaty of London (1913) legitimated Serbian authority in contemporary Macedonia. After the outbreak of World War I in 1914 the town was occupied by the Kingdom of Bulgaria. Since 1918 it was part of the Kingdom of Serbs, Croats, and Slovenes, and remained so until 1939, apart from a brief period of six months in 1920 when Skopje was controlled by the Yugoslav Communist Party.

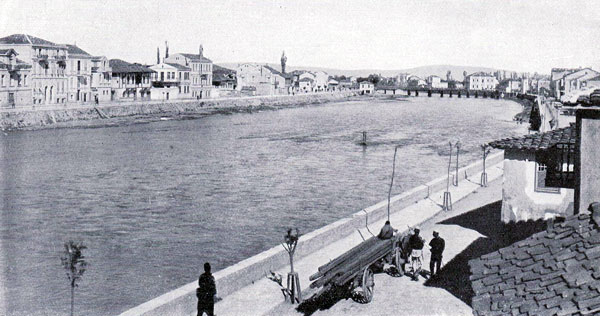
Vardar River in 1913.

The inter-war period of Royalist Yugoslavia saw significant immigration of ethnic Serbs into the region. An ethnic Serb ruling elite dominated over the rest, continuing the repression wrought by previous Turkish rulers.

In March 1941 when Yugoslavia entered the war, there were huge anti-war demonstrations in the streets of the town. Skopje came under German occupation on 7 April 1941 and was later taken over by Bulgarian forces. During the occupation, Bulgaria endowed Skopje with a national theatre, a library, a museum and for higher education the King Boris University. However, on 11 March 1943, Skopje's entire Jewish population of 3,286 was deported to the gas chambers of Treblinka concentration camp in German-occupied Poland. One month after the communists took power in September 1944 in Sofia, three Bulgarian armies re-entered occupied Yugoslavia. On November 13, units of First and Fourth Bulgarian Army, as well as, detachments of the Macedonian National Liberation Army seized Skopje. Then it joined Yugoslavia in 1944, when it became the capital of the newly established People's Republic of Macedonia.

== Socialist Republic of Macedonia ==
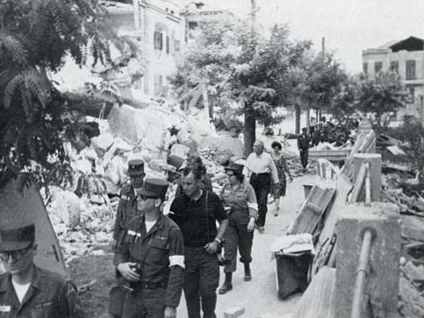
Members of the US Army 8th Evacuation Hospital in Skopje, Yugoslavia, following the earthquake in 1963. The unit was flown to the disaster site to provide medical care to the victims.

From 1945 until 1991 Skopje was the capital of the Socialist Republic of Macedonia. The city expanded and the population grew during this period from just over 150,000 in 1945 to almost 600,000 in the early 1990s. Continuing to be prone to natural disasters the city was flooded by the Vardar River in 1962 and then suffered considerable damage from a major earthquake, measuring 6.1 on the Richter scale, which killed over 1,000 people and made another 120,000 homeless. Eighty percent of the city was destroyed by the earthquake, and numerous cultural monuments were seriously damaged. The losses from the quake amounted to a massive 150% of Macedonia's GNP at the time and 15% of Yugoslavia's GNP. A major international relief effort saw the city rebuilt quickly, though much of its old neo-classical charm was lost in the process. The new master plan of the city was created by the then leading Japanese architect Kenzo Tange. The ruins of the old Skopje train station which was destroyed in the earthquake remain today as a memorial to the victims along with an adjacent museum.

Nearly all of the city's beautiful neo-classical 18th and 19th century buildings were destroyed in the earthquake, including the National Theater and many government buildings, as well as most of the Kale Fortress. International financial aid poured into Skopje in order to help rebuild the city. As a result, came the many modern (at the time) brutalist structures of the 1960s, that can still be seen today, such as the central post office building and the National Bank, as well as hundreds of now abandoned caravans and prefabricated mobile homes. Fortunately, though, as with previous earthquakes, much of the old Turkish side of town survived.

== Independence ==
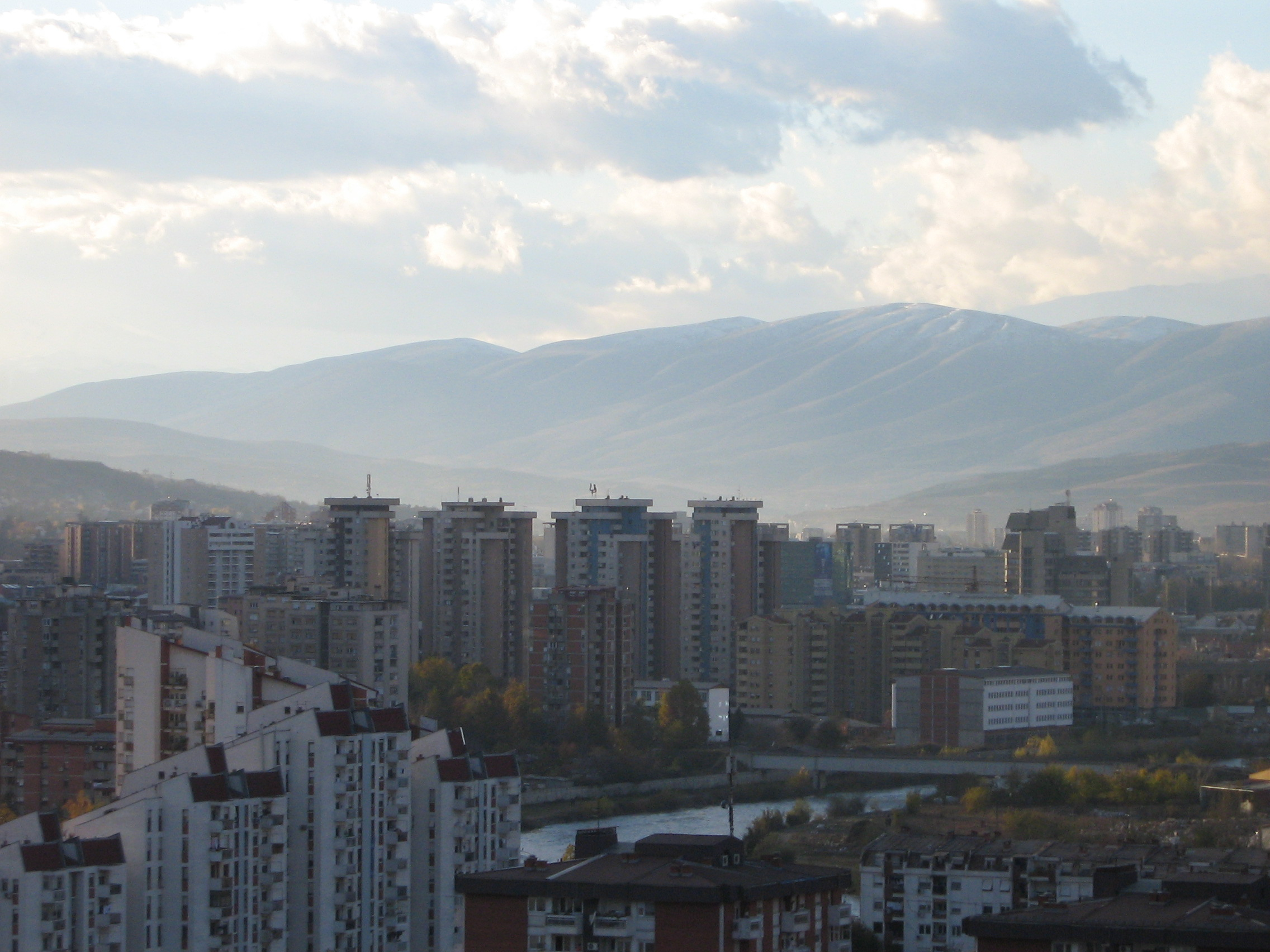
Highrises in modern Skopje.

Skopje made the transition easily from the capital of the Socialist Federal Yugoslav Republic of Macedonia to the capital of today's Republic of Macedonia. The city livened up considerably when Skopje housed the headquarters of the NATO intervention into Kosovo in 1998 and 1999. The city saw some rioting during 2001 when internal conflict between the Albanian community and the Macedonian majority erupted over lack of Albanian representation in government and other social institutions. Today, Skopje is seeing a makeover in buildings, streets and shops. The new VMRO–DPMNE government elected in July 2006 has pledged to restore the Kale fortress and to rebuild the beautiful 19th century Army House, the Old National Theatre, and the Old National Bank of Macedonia – all destroyed in the 1963 earthquake. Other projects under construction are the "Macedonian Struggle" Museum, the Archeological Museum of Macedonia, National Archive of Macedonia, Constitutional Court, and a new Philharmonic Theater. The city's national stadium Philip II Arena and the city's Alexander the Great Airport are also being reconstructed and expanded.

In January 2010, the government announced the Skopje 2014 project, which aims to transform central Skopje into the neoclassical style.

== See also ==
- Timeline of Skopje history
- Albanian Declaration of Independence
