= Orce Gjorgjievski =

Macedonian politician (born 1987)

- Орце Ѓорѓиевски
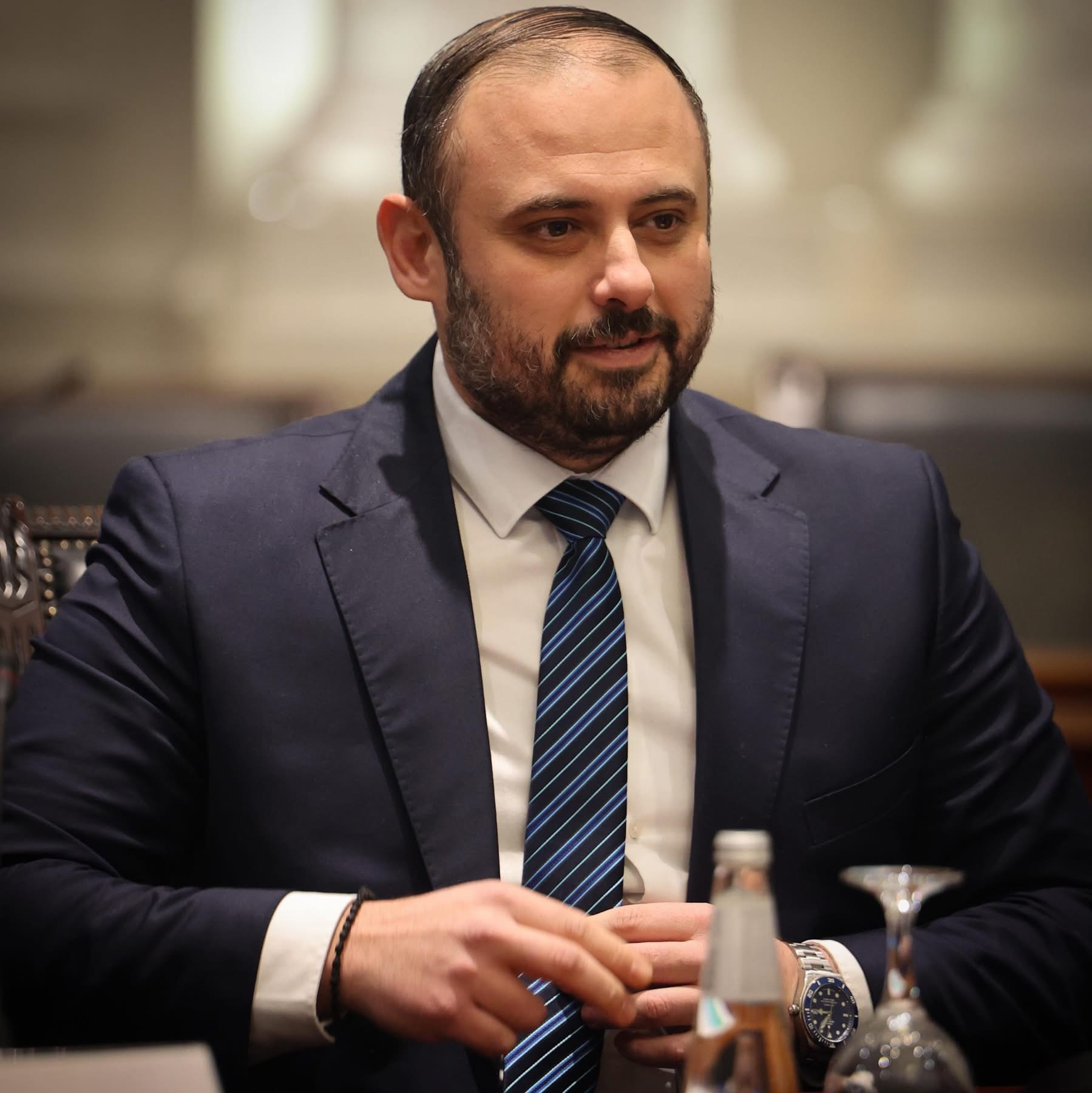

Mayor of Skopje
- Incumbent
- Assumed office November 6, 2025
- President: Gordana Siljanovska-Davkova
- Prime Minister: Hristijan Mickoski
- Preceded by: Danela Arsovska

Mayor of Kisela Voda
- In office November 6, 2021 – November 3, 2025
- Preceded by: Filip Temelkovski
- Succeeded by: Beti Stamenkoska-Trajkoska

Councilor of Kisela Voda
- In office 2017–2021

Personal details
- Born: August 5, 1987 (age 39) Skopje, SFR Yugoslavia
- Party: VMRO-DPMNE
- Education: Ss. Cyril and Methodius University of Skopje
- Occupation: Politician

Orce Gjorgjievski (Note: Also spelled Orce Ǵorǵievski) (Macedonian: Орце Ѓорѓиевски, born August 5, 1987) is a Macedonian politician currently serving as mayor of Skopje. He previously served as mayor and councilor of the Kisela Voda Municipality.

== Biography ==
Gjorgjievski was born in Skopje, SFR Yugoslavia, on August 5, 1987. He graduated from the Ss. Cyril and Methodius University of Skopje with a degree in political science. He also holds a master's degree in human resource management.

=== Political career ===
Gjorgjievski jointed the VMRO-DPMNE party in 2005 when he was 18 years old. He first became the chairman of the Municipal Committee of the UMS (Union of Young Forces of the VMRO-DPMNE) in Kisela Voda, after which he advanced through higher roles within the party, including vice president of UMS in 2015 and member of the executive committee in 2018. Gjorgjievski's first publicly elected office charge was as a councilor in the municipal council of Kisela Voda. In October 2021, Gjorgjievski ran for the post of mayor of Kisela Voda and won the first round of elections, succeeding Filip Temelkovski as mayor. In July 2025, the executive committee of VMRO-DPMNE nominated Gjorgjievski as a candidate for the position of mayor of Skopje. During the November 3 runoff elections, Gjorgjievski managed to secure 57.03% of the votes, becoming the mayor of Skopje.
