= Mayor of Skopje =

Political position in North Macedonia

- Градоначалник на Скопје; Kryetari i Qytetit të Shkupit
- Coat of arms of Skopje

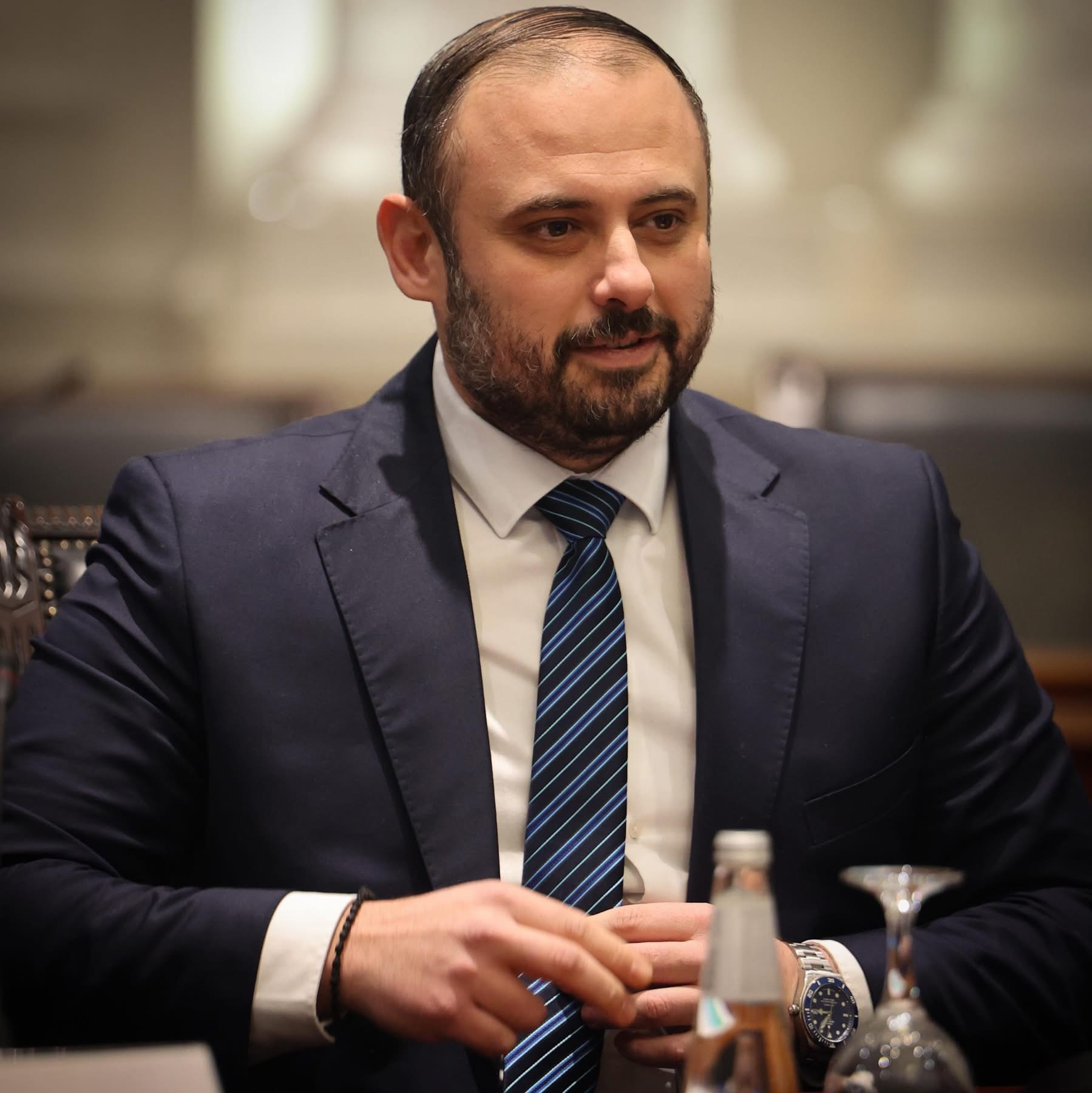
- Incumbent; Orce Ǵorǵievski since November 6, 2025
- Term length: Four years
- Inaugural holder: Milan Talevski
- Formation: 1991 (Republic of Macedonia); 1941 (PR Macedonia); 1912 (WW1)
- Website: Official website

The mayor of Skopje (Macedonian: Градоначeлник на Скопје, romanized: Gradonachelnik na Skopje; Latin: Kryetari i Qytetit të Shkupit) is the city mayor who is representing North Macedonia's capital city Greater Skopje and all of its municipalities. Also, the mayor's decisions are confirmed or rejected by the City Council of Skopje. The obligations of the mayor include:

- declaring the acts of the Council and publishes them in the "Official Gazette of the City of Skopje";
- caring and ensuring the implementation of the acts of the Council;
- caring for the activities that with law are entrusted to the City of Skopje;
- proposing to the Council for making decisions and other general acts of its jurisdiction, etc.

Mayor cooperates with the municipal mayors of the city of Skopje, for building common views, common setting priorities and taking joint action on certain issues and problems of interest to the city as a whole. The current mayor of Skopje is Orce Ǵorǵievski.

== City Council ==
Composition of the Skopje City Council: VMRO-Democratic Party for Macedonian National Unity - 22 Social Democratic Union of Macedonia - 14 Democratic Union for Integration - 5 Democratic Party of Albanians - 3 Democratic Renewal of Macedonia - 1 Reference:

The council of Skopje has in total 45 councilors which are elected in general, direct, free and democratic elections. The members of the City Council are elected with a mandate that lasts four years. The councilors represent the citizens. The current president of the council is Irena Misheva. The duties of the council are:

- adopts the Statute of the City of Skopje and other regulations;
- adopts the budget and annual account of the City of Skopje;
- determines the amount of its own sources of revenue to fund the City of Skopje, within the borders determined by law;
- establishes public services within the remit of the City and supervises their work;
- adopts programs and financial plans to fund public services; funder is the City of Skopje;
- adopts reports on budget execution and the annual account of the City of Skopje;
- grants permission to perform activities of public interest and local significance, in accordance with law;
- adopts the reports on working and annual accounts of public services; funder is the City of Skopje;
- decides on how to dispose of the property of the City of Skopje;
- decides on how to perform the financial control of the budget of the City of Skopje, in accordance with law;
- reviews and adopts the annual report on public safety in the area of the City of Skopje, which is submitted to the Ministry of Internal Affairs and the Ombudsman;
- makes recommendations to the manager of the local branch of the Ministry of Internal Affairs of public security and safety in traffic, etc.

== List of mayors of Skopje ==
The list of the mayors of Skopje includes the following persons:

=== Kingdom of Serbia ===
#	Name	Took office	Left office
1st	Spiro Hadži-Ristić	1912	1915

=== Kingdom of Bulgaria ===
#	Name	Took office	Left office
1st	Gjore Kitinchev	1915	1917
2nd	Hristo Popkotsev	1917	1918

=== Kingdom of Yugoslavia ===
#	Name	Took office	Left office
1st	Spiro Hadži-Ristić	1918	1920
2nd	Dušan Cekić	1920	same year
3rd	Kosta Stefanović - Arsenovski	1920	1921
4th	Aleksandar Bukvić	1921	1923
5th	Nikola Sapundžhić	1923	1929
6th	Josif Mihajlović	1929	1936
7th	Dr. Petar S. Jovanović	1936	same year
8th	Panta Jovanović	1936	1938
9th	Kosta Čohadžić	1938	1939
10th	Josif Mihajlović	1939	1941

=== Kingdom of Bulgaria ===
#	Name	Took office	Left office
1st	Yanko Mustakov	1941	same yеаr
2nd	Spiro Kitinchev	1941	1944

=== Socialist Federative Republic of Yugoslavia ===
#	Name	Took office	Left office
1st	Lazar Tanev	1944	1945
2nd	Dimche Zografski	1945	1947
3rd	Gorgji Ikonomov	1947	1948
4th	Dushko Lukarski	1948	same year
5th	Vera Aceva	1948	same year
6th	Asparuh Kanevchev	1949	same year
7th	Naum Naumovski - Borche	1950	same year
8th	Blagoja Nikolovski	1951	same year
9th	Kemal Sejfula	1951	1954
10th	Vasil Gjorgov	1954	1956
11th	Naum Naumovski - Borche	1956	1960
12th	Krste Markovski	1960	1963
13th	Blagoj Popov	1963	1969
14th	Dragoljub Stavrev	1969	1974
15th	Metodi Antonov	1974	1982
16th	Trajko Apostolski	1982	1984
17th	Dushan Popovski	1984	1986
18th	Jugoslav Todorovski	1986	1991

=== Republic of North Macedonia ===
#	Name	Took office	Left office	Political party
1st	Milan Talevski	1991	1993	VMRO-DPMNE
2nd	Goran Nikolovski	1993	1995	VMRO-DPMNE
3rd	Jove Kekenovski	1995	1996	VMRO-DPMNE
4th	Risto Penov	1996	2005	Liberal Democratic Party
5th	Trifun Kostovski	2005	2009	Independent
6th	Koce Trajanovski	2009	2017	VMRO-DPMNE
7th	Petre Shilegov	2017	2021	SDSM
8th	Danela Arsovska	2021	2025	Independent
9th	Orce Ǵorǵievski	2025	Incumbent	VMRO-DPMNE

== See also ==
- Timeline of Skopje
