= Gorno Lisiče =

Gorno Lisiče Горно Лисиче
- Neighbourhood
- Location in Aerodrom Municipality

- Location within North Macedonia
- Coordinates: 41°58′N 21°29′E
- Country: North Macedonia
- Region: Skopje
- Municipality: Aerodrom

Population (2002)
  - Total: 18,233
- Time zone: UTC+1 (CET)
  - Summer (DST): UTC+2 (CEST)
- Car plates: SK
- Website: .

Gorno Lisiče (pronounced [gorno lisit͡ʃe]; Macedonian: Горно Лисиче) is a neighbourhood in the city of Skopje, North Macedonia, administered by the Aerodrom Municipality.

== Demographics ==
According to the 2002 census, the town had a total of 18,233 inhabitants. Ethnic groups in the town include:

- Macedonians 16,408
- Albanians 721
- Serbs 405
- Romani 357
- Turks 93
- Bosniaks 20
- Vlachs 98
- Others 121

== Sports ==
FK Gorno Lisiče is the local football club. The club competes in the Second Macedonian Football League. The club currently plays at the Cementarnica Stadium in Kisela Voda Municipality.
