= Danela Arsovska =

Macedonian politician (born 1979)

- Данела Арсовска
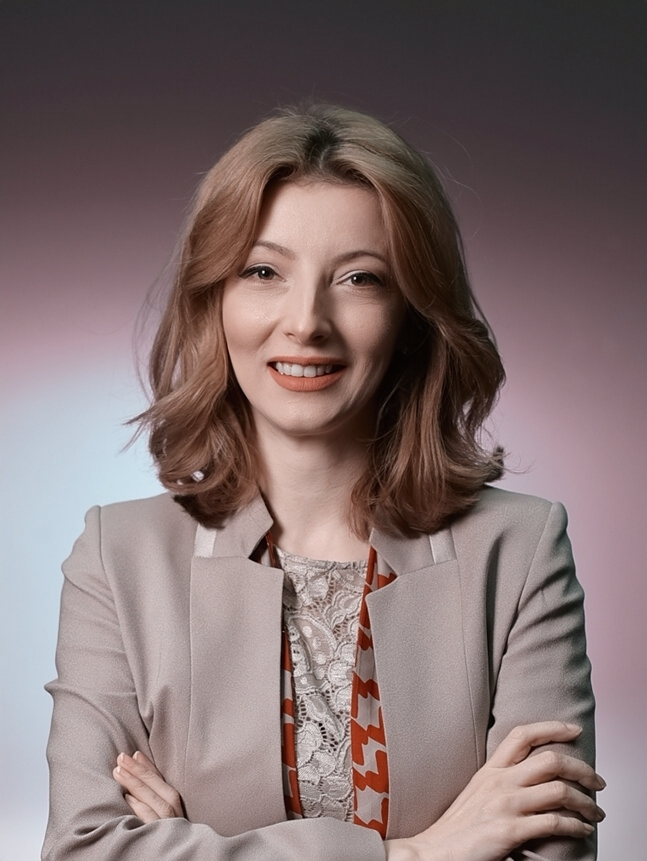

Mayor of Skopje
- In office 1 November 2021 – 6 November 2025
- Preceded by: Petre Šilegov
- Succeeded by: Orce Gjorgjievski

Personal details
- Born: 20 December 1979 (age 46) Skopje, SR Macedonia, SFR Yugoslavia
- Party: New Alternative
- Education: Ss. Cyril and Methodius University in Skopje; University of Oxford; University of Sheffield

Danela Arsovska (Macedonian: Данела Арсовска) is a Macedonian politician and was the mayor of Skopje from 2021 to 2025. In 2014, she was elected as President of the Macedonian Chambers of Commerce, which is the union of national chambers of commerce, promoting economic cooperation on national and international level based on principles of free trade and fair competition. She was appointed Chair of the Macedonian Union of Employers' Organizations in 2015.

== Early life and education ==
She was born in 1979 in Skopje. Arsovska obtained a bachelor's degree in law in Skopje at the Ss. Cyril and Methodius University. She has a master's degree in economics and executive education from the University of Oxford and University of Sheffield.

She holds a range of academic and consulting positions in North Macedonia and internationally and has lectured on development topics at universities and conferences. Arsovska is fluent in Macedonian, English, German and also speaks Bulgarian and Serbian.

== Domestic and international career ==
In 2014, she became the president of the Macedonian Chambers of Commerce, while in 2015 she became the head of the Macedonian Union of Employers' Organizations. She has served on the panel at the World Bank's International Centre for Settlement of Investment Disputes in Washington, USA, since 2016. In 2017 she was appointed by North Macedonia as a court member at the OSCE Court of Conciliation and Arbitration in Geneva, Switzerland, and is also a court member of the Permanent Court of Arbitration in The Hague, Netherlands. Arsovska is the Macedonian representative in the International Chamber of Commerce (ICC) and elected General Council Member in the World Chambers Federation.

== Awards and recognitions ==
In recognition of her work in 2018 the World Business Angels Investment Forum awarded Arsovska as "Best Business Woman Role Model of South East Europe". In 2019 at the 6th Entrepreneurs Summit of Central and Southeast Europe, Arsovska was awarded with the Recognition for her special contribution to the entrepreneurship development. In 2020 Arsovska was awarded with Certificate of Merit by Kunio Mikuriya, Secretary General of the World Customs Organization, as recognition for her contribution to customs development. The recognition was presented by the Director General of the Macedonian Customs Administration.

== Political career ==
=== 2021 local elections ===
In the run-up for the local elections in North Macedonia scheduled for 17 and 31 October 2021, Danela Arsovska announced her candidacy as an independent candidate for mayor of Skopje. In a very short time, she collected the number of citizens' signatures required for official candidacy. As an independent candidate, she also received support from the largest opposition party in North Macedonia, VMRO-DPMNE, and its coalition partners from the Albanian political bloc: Alliance for Albanians and Alternativa.

During the campaign, the ruling Social Democratic Union of Macedonia party presented documents claiming Bulgarian citizenship to Danela and her husband. Arsovska herself has denied these claims. The prime minister Zoran Zaev expected Arovska to withdraw from the local elections. Per Zaev, her Bulgarian citizenship was a problem: political, ethical, dishonest. At the same time, a reference on the website of the Bulgarian Ministry of Interior confirmed the authenticity of the data from the identification cards of the couple. On this occasion, the Ministry of Foreign Affairs of Bulgaria expressed an official protest, insisting hate speech against Bulgaria is a denial of the European values. Despite the campaign against her, Arsovska was elected as mayor of the city.

=== New Alternative ===
In January 2024, she became the leader of the party New Alternative (Macedonian: Нова алтернатива, romanized: Nova alternativa). She announced that the party under her leadership will be based on four postulates – justice, freeing the economy from the constraints of big capital and introducing equal opportunities, fighting against corruption and crime, and full digitization of public administration.
