= Aerodrom Municipality, Skopje =

Municipality of North Macedonia

Municipality of Aerodrom Општина Аеродром
- City municipality (Urban)
- Flag Coat of arms

- Coordinates: 41°59′N 21°28′E
- Country: North Macedonia
- Region: Skopje
- Municipal seat: Aerodrom

Government
  - Mayor: Dejan Miteski (VMRO-DPMNE)

Area
  - Total: 20 km^{2} (7.7 sq mi)

Population
  - Total: 77,735
  - Density: 3,600.45/km^{2} (9,325.1/sq mi)
- Time zone: UTC+1 (CET)
- Website: http://www.aerodrom.gov.mk

Aerodrom (Macedonian: Аеродром; [ˈaɛrɔdrɔm], meaning Airport or Aerodrome) is the largest in population of the ten municipalities that make up the city of Skopje, North Macedonia's capital. Despite its name, it is not home to Skopje International Airport, which is in Petrovec.

== Geography ==
Aerodrom borders Kisela Voda Municipality to the southwest, Centar Municipality to the northwest, Gazi Baba Municipality to the northeast, and Studeničani Municipality to the south.

== Demographics ==
According to North Macedonia's 2021 census, the Aerodrom municipality has 77,735 inhabitants. Ethnic groups in this municipality include:

	2002		2021	
	Number	%	Number	%
TOTAL	72,009	100	77,735	100
Macedonians	64,391	89.42	66,245	85.22
Serbs	3,085	4.28	2,155	2.77
Albanians	1,014	1.41	851	1.09
Vlachs	501	0.7	652	0.84
Turks	430	0.6	464	0.6
Roma	580	0.81	459	0.59
Bosniaks	538	0.75	403	0.52
Other / Undeclared / Unknown	1,470	2.03	1,258	1.62
Persons for whom data are taken from administrative sources			5,248	6.75

Aerodrom Park, Skopje 2015

The total number of students in the municipality in 2011, in comparison to the total number of students in 2007, increased by 9.9%. Aerodrom is the first municipality in Macedonia by rise of the total number of students.[4]

== Sport ==
- MZT Skopje is the most popular and successful Macedonian basketball club. The club competes in the Macedonian First League and Adriatic League. The club's home ground is the Jane Sandanski Arena, and is an 11-time domestic champion.
- FK Gorno Lisiče is a football club based in the Gorno Lisiče neighbourhood. The club competes in the Third Macedonian Football League, with its current home ground at the Cementarnica Stadium in Kisela Voda Municipality.
