= Flag of Skopje =

Flag of Skopje

The flag of Skopje (in Macedonian: Знаме на Скопје; Albanian: Flamuri i Shkupit) is a red vertical banner in proportions 1:2 with the coat of arms of the city in golden-yellow placed in its left upper quarter. The coat of arms has the form of a shield and on it are pictured: the Stone Bridge with the Vardar River, the fortress Kale and the snowy peaks of a mountain.

The old flag of Skopje in Socialist Yugoslavia was seen in an exhibition of Socialist partner cities of Dresden (then in the German Democratic Republic), in the beginning of the 1980s. The emblem must have been adopted in the 1950s or even before. In any case, it was shown on 1969 postage stamps of Yugoslavia.

== See also ==
- Skopje
- Coat of arms of Skopje
