= Koce Trajanovski =

Macedonian politician

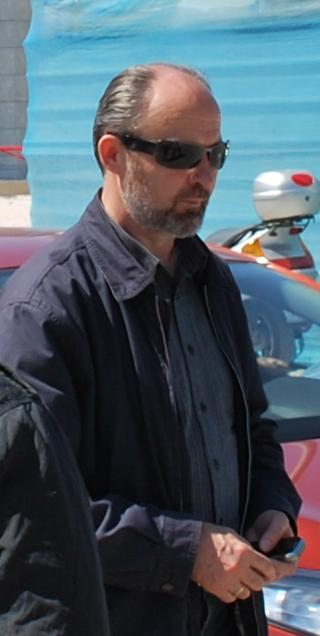

Director of the Public Enterprise for State Roads North Macedonia
- Incumbent
- Assumed office July 2024

Mayor of Skopje
- In office 2009–2017
- Preceded by: Trifun Kostovski
- Succeeded by: Petre Šilegov

Personal details
- Party: VMRO-DPMNE
- Education: Ss. Cyril and Methodius University in Skopje

Koce Trajanovski (Macedonian: Коце Трајановски) is a Macedonian politician. He is a member of the opposition party VMRO-DPMNE. He served as the Mayor of Skopje from 2009 to 2017. Before he was the mayor of Skopje, he was a Member of Parliament and mayor of the Gazi Baba Municipality. He was born in 1956 in Skopje. He studied at the Faculty of Mechanical Engineering at the Ss. Cyril and Methodius University in Skopje and graduated in 1980. In 1981, he started work at MTZ – Hepos where he was in charge of the computer management area. After that, he opened his own private computer software firm and closed that firm after 2 years of unsuccessfully managing that business. In 1998, he was elected MP from the winning party. In 2005 he was elected mayor of Gazi Baba. And in 2009 he was elected for his first mandate as mayor of Skopje. After the 2013 local elections in March he was elected for a second mandate. After the 2017 local elections held in October he was replaced by Petre Šilegov. On July 2024, The former mayor of Skopje, Koce Trajanovski, was appointed as the new director of the Public Enterprise for State Roads.

== Awards and decorations ==
- 2016: Commander of the Order of the Star of Italian Solidarity
