= Trifun Kostovski =

Macedonian politician, businessman and singer (born 1946)

Mayor of Skopje
- In office 2005–2009
- Preceded by: Risto Penov
- Succeeded by: Koce Trajanovski

Personal details
- Born: 27 December 1946 (age 79) Skopje, PR Macedonia, SFR Yugoslavia (present-day North Macedonia)
- Education: Ss. Cyril and Methodius University in Skopje

Trifun Kostovski (Macedonian: Трифун Срце-Тетовирано Костовски; born 27 December 1946 in Skopje) is a Macedonian politician, businessman and singer, and the ex-Mayor of Skopje.

He is married and he has three children. He graduated from the Faculty of Economics at the Ss. Cyril and Methodius University in Skopje. He is fluent in English, Polish, Russian and Croatian.

== Career history ==
Founder of Kometal Trade Gmbh, Vienna, Austria (1991). The Company deals with activities in the field of metallurgy on the Austrian, Swiss, Polish, Ukrainian and Russian markets.

=== Prior experience ===
- First employment in Tehnometal-Macedonia, Skopje (1971)
- Representative of Tehnometal-Macedonia in Warsaw office
- Employment in Swiss company Sitko, Vienna (1989)
- Representative of Sitko in Warsaw office

== Key achievements and awards ==
- “Clement of Ohrid” Award for achievements in the sphere of science, arts, culture and humanitarian work (2004)
- Founder of "Trifun Kostovski" Fund within the Macedonian Academy of Sciences and Arts. The Fund sponsors editions, publications, scientific projects, and collections of fine arts of national importance
- Ktitor of the building of the cathedral church “Holly Mother of God”, protector of Skopje
- President and sponsor of the football club FK Vardar
- Founder and financier of several media houses in North Macedonia
- Financing and supporting great number of NGOs, hospitals and social institutions, humanitarian and voluntary activities, aids to disabled, financial support for the poor people, donations for operations and treatment of sick people
- Sponsorship for education of young musicians and artists
- Sponsorship for preservation and restoration of cultural and historical monuments
- Sponsorship for the sacred places of the Macedonian Orthodox Church
- Donations for important activities and buildings in Skopje (street “Vodnjanska”, quay “November 13th”, boulevard “Marx and Engels”, monument of Mother Teresa, infrastructure in several schools, gymnasiums, faculties and villages) and in other cities in the country.

== Political involvement ==
- Member of Parliament, in capacity of an independent member from 2002 to 2005
- International Crisis Group (ICG) Board Member
- US Council on Foreign Relations Corporate Member
- Global Business Coalition on HIV/AIDS Corporate Member
- Member of the Business Advisory Council, Working Table II of the Stability Pact for South Eastern Europe
- Member of the Parliamentary Assembly of CEI
- Founder and member of Forum for Macedonia 2001
- Founder and member of Forum for Euro-Atlantic Integration of Republic of Macedonia (FEIM)
- Ex-President of the Macedonian Handball Federation
- Mayor of Skopje from 2005 to 2009

== Sports involvement ==
- Former owner of the football club FK Rabotnički
- Former owner of the football club FK Vardar
- Former owner of the women's handball club RK Kometal Gjorče Petrov
- Former owner of the football club FK Borec
