= Coat of arms of Skopje =

The coat of arms of the City of Skopje (Macedonian: Грб на Скопје; Albanian: Stema e Shkupit) is an emblem in the form of a renaissance shield, depicting the Šar Mountains, the Skopje Fortress, the Vardar river and the Stone Bridge, all important landmarks of the city and North Macedonia as a whole.

== Replacement proposals ==
The coat of arms of Skopje has been categorized as "near-heraldic" in the Macedonian Heraldic Society's review of municipal symbols in Macedonia due to being a landscape composition with several charges. The society had suggested a heraldic revision of the symbol, which resulted in several alternative proposals. However the proposals haven't gotten to the point of being considered by the government.

=== Proposal by Aleksandar Kurov ===
In 2006, heraldic artist, Aleksandar Kurov designed a version of the coat of arms of Skopje with some modified elements and completely new illustration style, this proposal later appeared in the 7th issue of "Macedonian Herald" courtesy of the Macedonian Heraldic Society.

=== Proposal by the Macedonian Heraldic Society ===
In 2020, on the occasion of the liberation of Skopje, the Macedonian Heraldic Society published a design inspired by Aleksandar Kurov's proposal, but this time with greater attention to the Rule of tincture, the design also used the Macedonian territorial heraldic system, as such it featured a mural crown of the capital city and a wreath of Macedonian oak.

== Historical versions ==
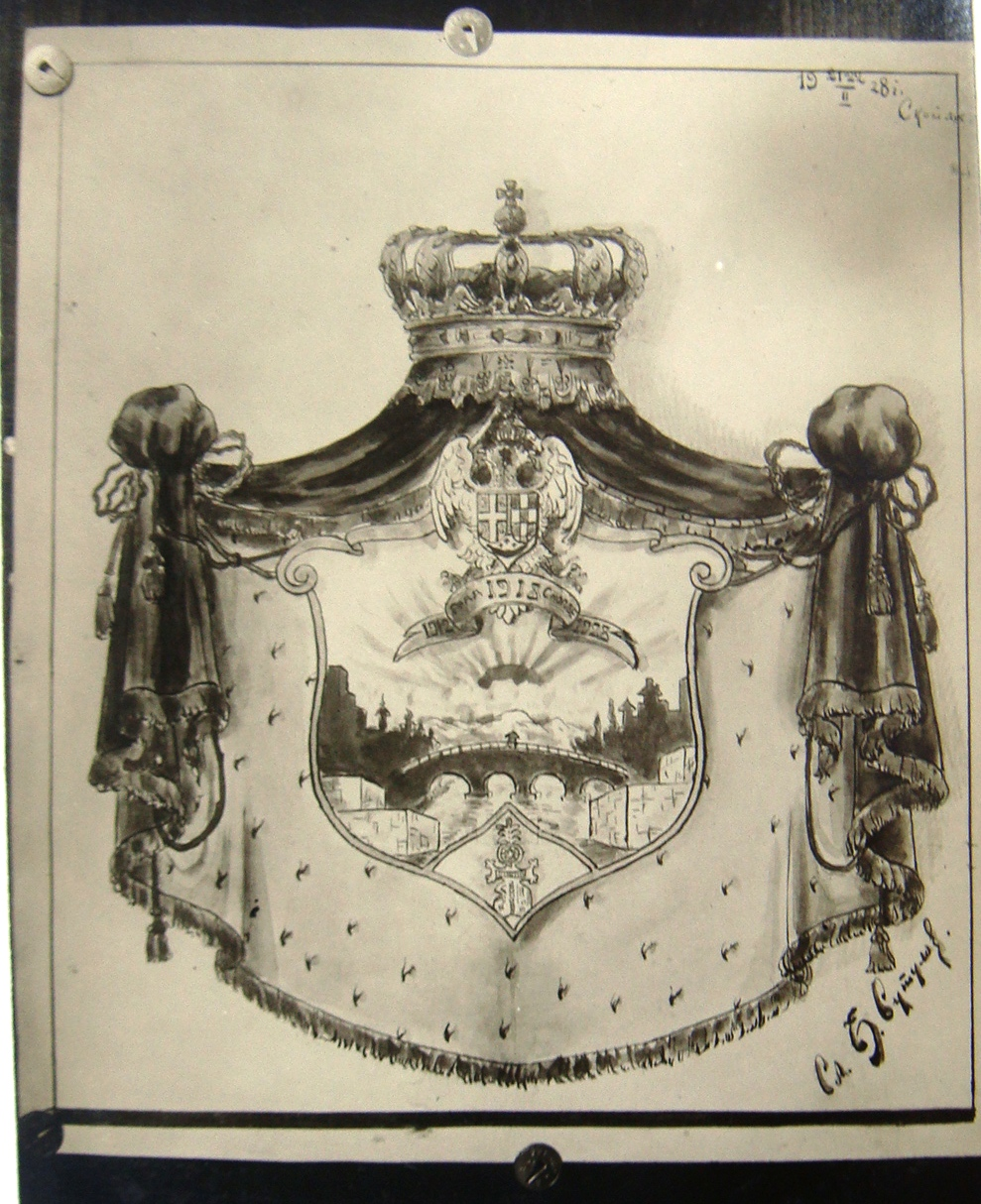
“Proposal” for arms of the city of Skopje, Kingdom of Serbs, Croats and Slovenes, 1928

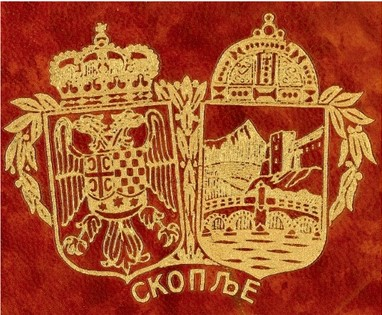
The coat of arms of the City of Skopje, engraved on a book cover of the collection of King Alexander Karadjordjevic, the design also appears on the Vardar Banovina fire brigade diploma, before 1934

== See also ==
- Skopje
- Flag of Skopje
