= Aerodrom, Skopje =

Aerodrom Аеродром
- Location in Aerodrom Municipality

- Location within North Macedonia
- Coordinates: 41°59′2″N 21°27′36″E
- Country: North Macedonia
- Region: Skopje
- Municipality: Aerodrom

Population (2002)
  - Total: 72,009

Aerodrom is a neighbourhood in the city of Skopje, North Macedonia, and the seat of Aerodrom Municipality.

== Demographics ==
According to the 2002 census, the neighborhood had a total of 72,009 inhabitants. Ethnic groups in the neighborhood include:

- Macedonians = 64,391 (89.4%)
- Serbs = 3,085 (4.3%)
- Albanians = 1,014 (1.4%)
- others.
