= Stone Bridge (Skopje) =

Bridge in Skopje, Macedonia

Stone Bridge Камен Мост (Macedonian) Ura e Gurit (Albanian)
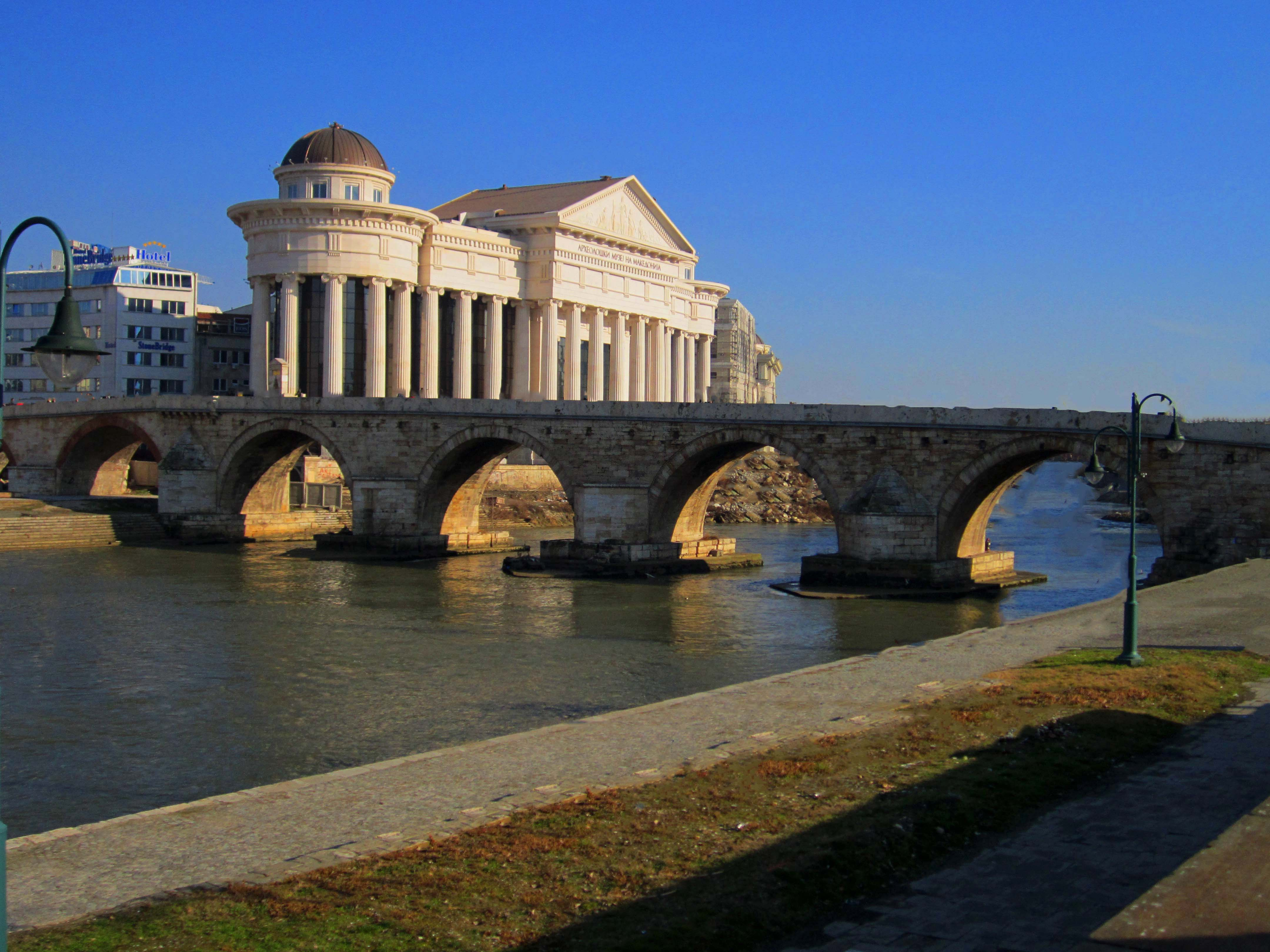
- Coordinates: 41°59′49″N 21°25′59″E
- Crosses: Vardar River
- Locale: Skopje, North Macedonia

Characteristics
- Design: Arch bridge
- Total length: 214 m
- Width: 6 m

History
- Construction start: 1451
- Construction end: 1469

Location
- Interactive map of Stone Bridge

The Stone Bridge (Macedonian: Камен мост, romanized: Kamen most Камен мост; Albanian: Ura e gurit; Turkish: Taşköprü) is a bridge across the Vardar River in Skopje, the capital of North Macedonia, built by Sultan Mehmed the Conqueror.

The bridge is considered a symbol of Skopje and is the main element of the coat of arms of the city, which in turn is incorporated in the city's flag. It is located in Centar Municipality and it connects Macedonia Square to the Old Bazaar.

== Architecture ==
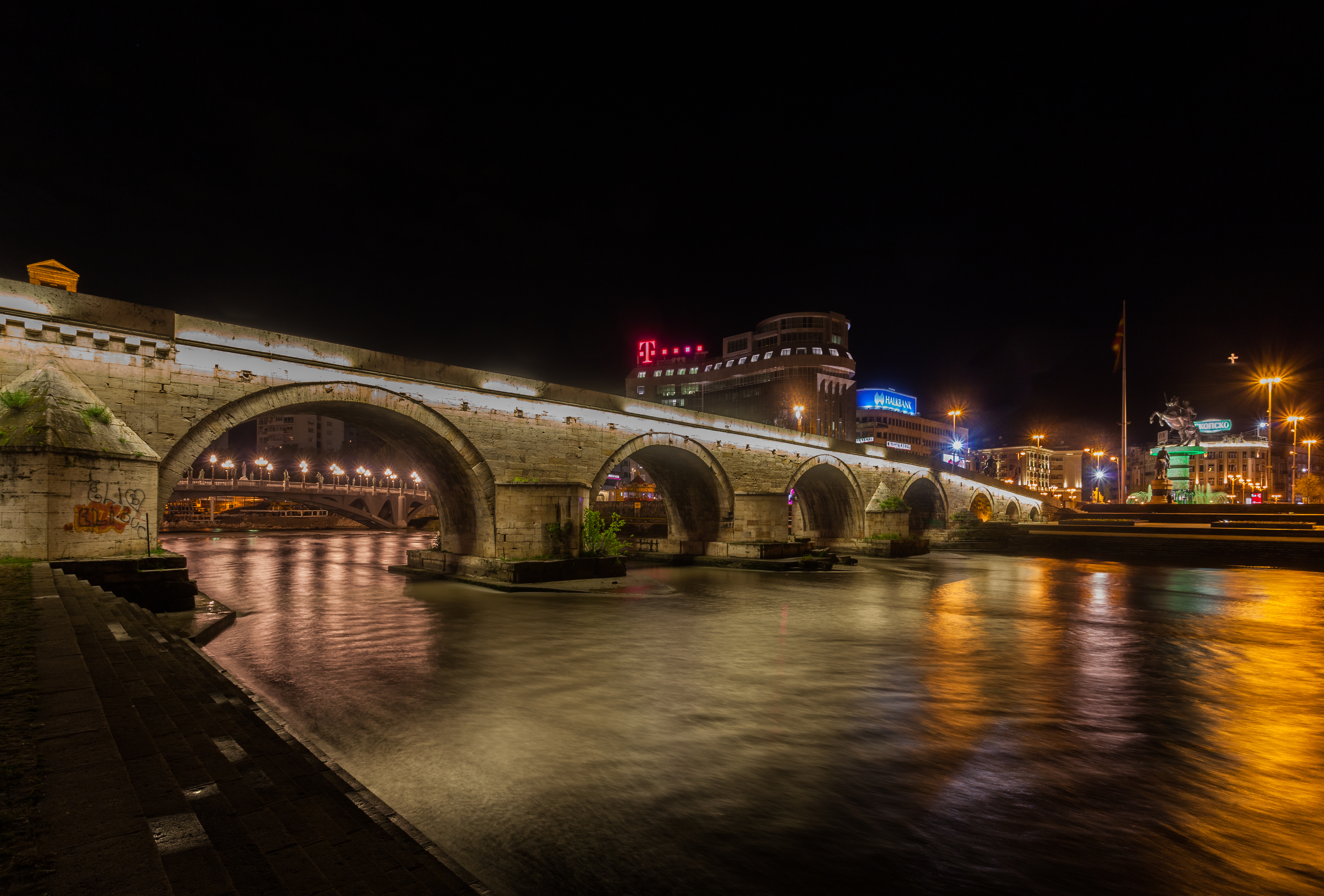
Night view of the bridge.

The Stone Bridge is built of solid stone blocks and is supported by firm columns that are connected with 12 semicircular arcs. The bridge is 214 m (702 ft) long and 6 m (20 ft) wide. The guardhouse has recently been reconstructed.

== History ==
The current Stone Bridge was built on Roman foundations under the patronage of Sultan Mehmed II the Conqueror between 1451 and 1469. Most of the Stone Bridge originates from the Ottoman period and throughout the centuries, the Stone Bridge was often damaged and then repaired. There is historical evidence that it once suffered during the great earthquake of 1555 which heavily damaged or destroyed four pillars. Renovations were carried out the same year. Some executions have also taken place on this bridge, such as the execution of Karposh in 1689.

Serbia acquired new territory in Macedonia after the Second Balkan War. Serbian army units, in collaboration with informal groups, began to arbitrarily destroy Ottoman buildings. To prevent further destruction, British consuls would persuade Serbian military commanders that certain constructions dated back to Stefan Dusan's empire. The Skopje Bridge is one such example. Because of that it was also known as the Dušan Bridge.

By the German retreat from the city in November 1944, explosives were placed on the bridge by Nazis. Upon a request from city notables, the Germans gave up at the last minute and the bridge was saved from destruction. The last reconstruction of the bridge began in 1994. Over seven years during the Stone Bridge refurbishment of the 1990s, people were not allowed to cross the structure and for many craftsmen from the nearby Old Bazaar it resulted in negative economic effects. The watchtower shaped like a mihrab was reconstructed in 2008.

Two parts of Skopje that have symbolised its urban contrasts of "Ottoman" or "modern", the "historic" or "socialist", "Albanian" or "Macedonian" are split by the river Vardar and linked by the Stone Bridge. In the twenty first century, members of the majority and minority groups of the capital city view the stone bridge as representing the split between two parts of Skopje.

== Gallery ==
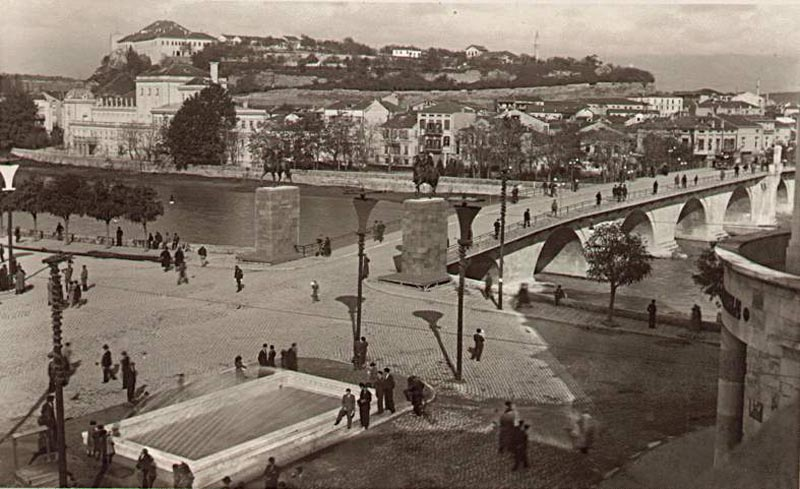
Stone Bridge and Macedonia Square in the early 1920s

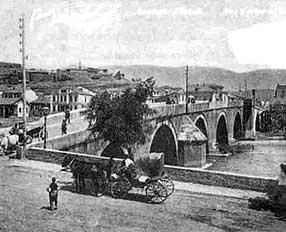
Stone Bridge in 1909

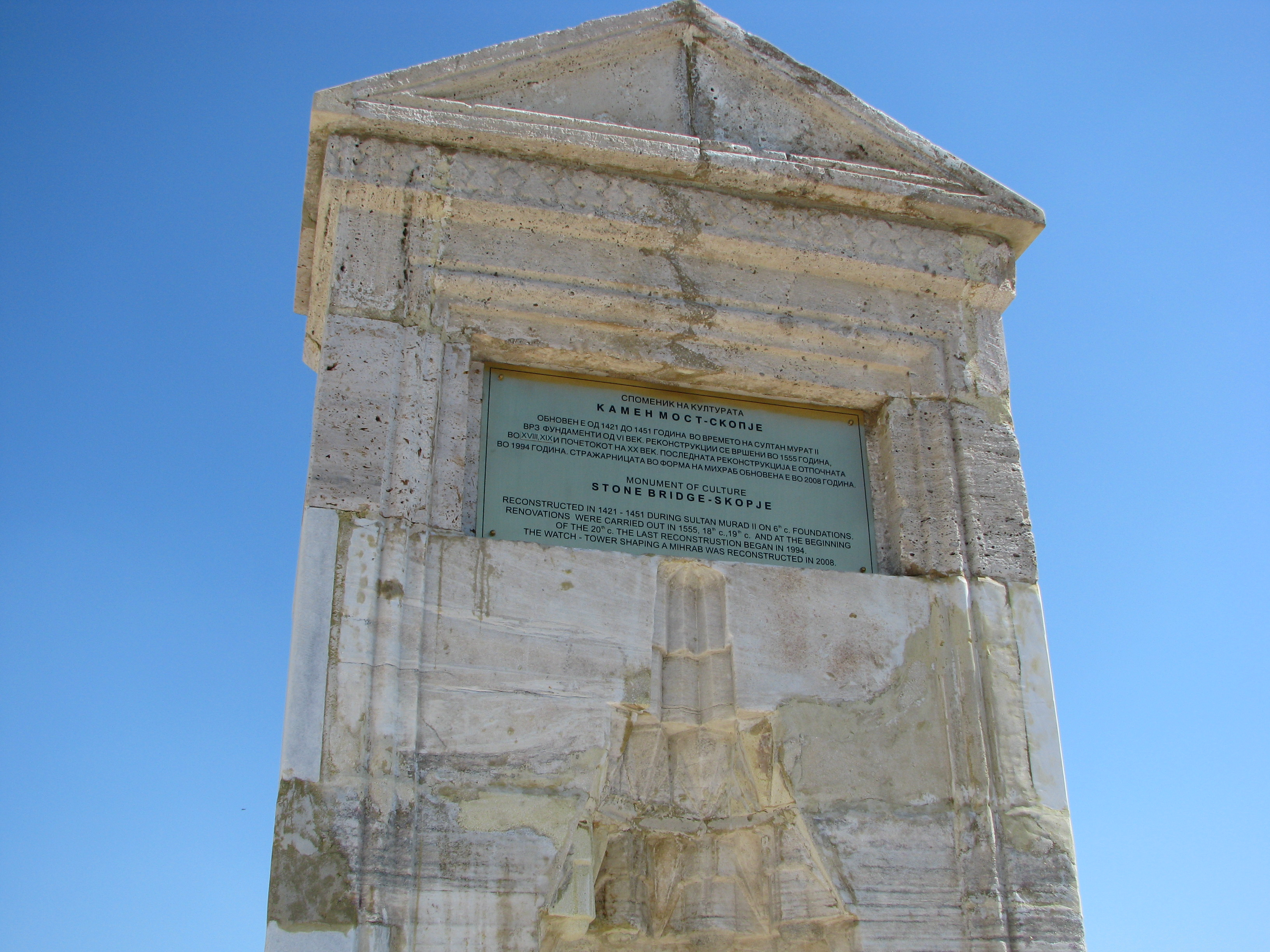
Inscription on the bridge

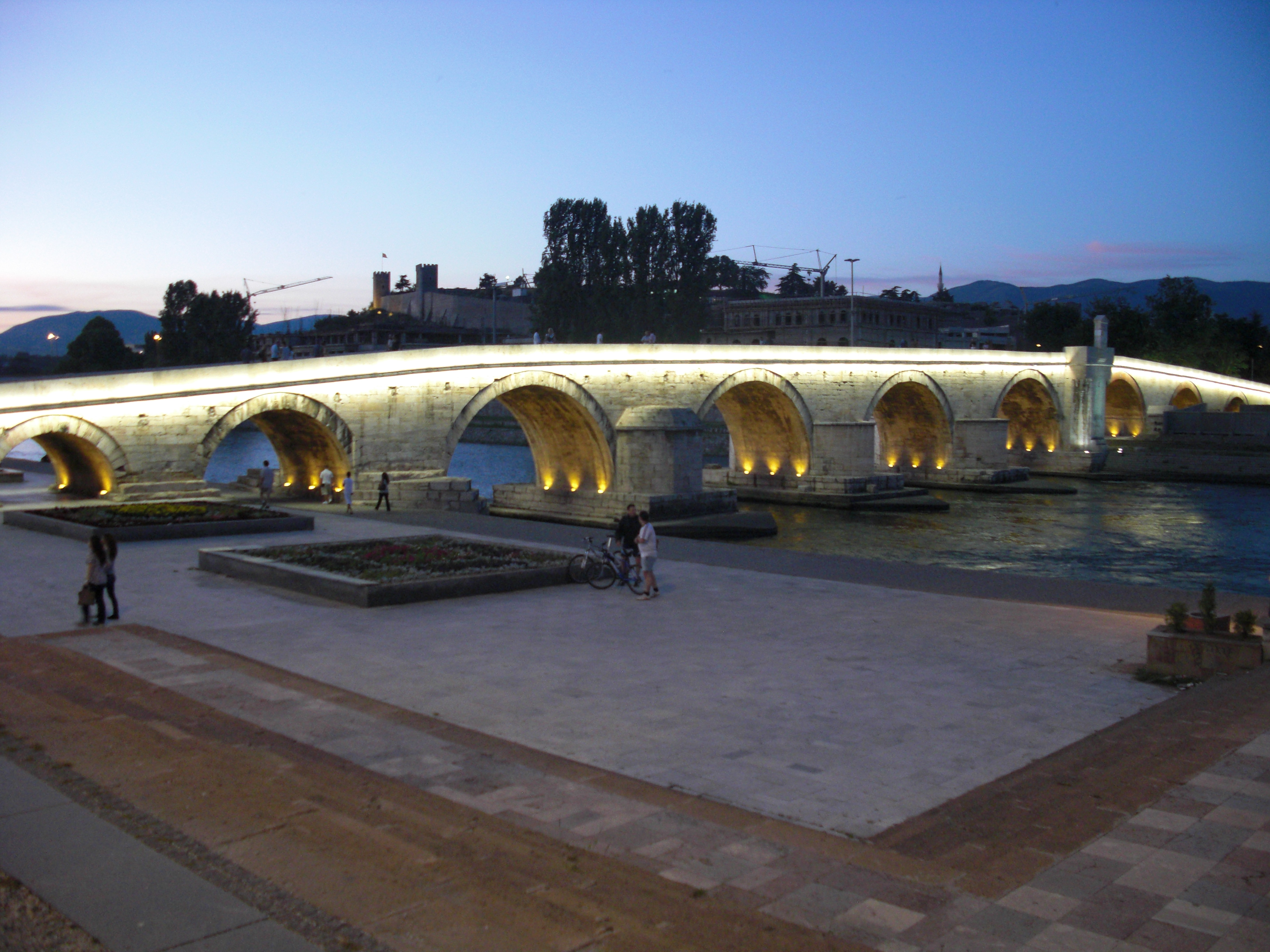
Stone Bridge at night

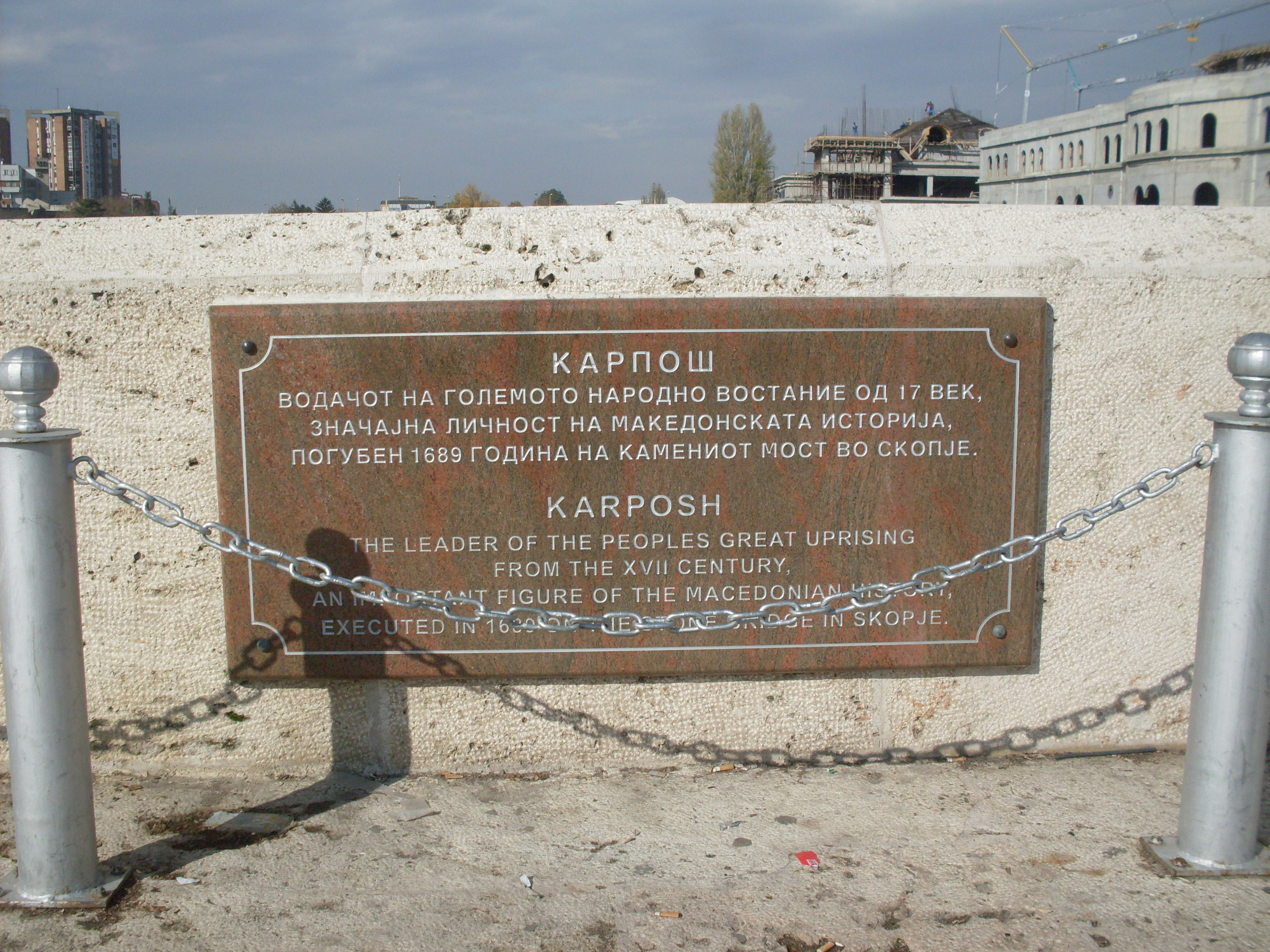
Memorial plaque on the site of Karposh's execution

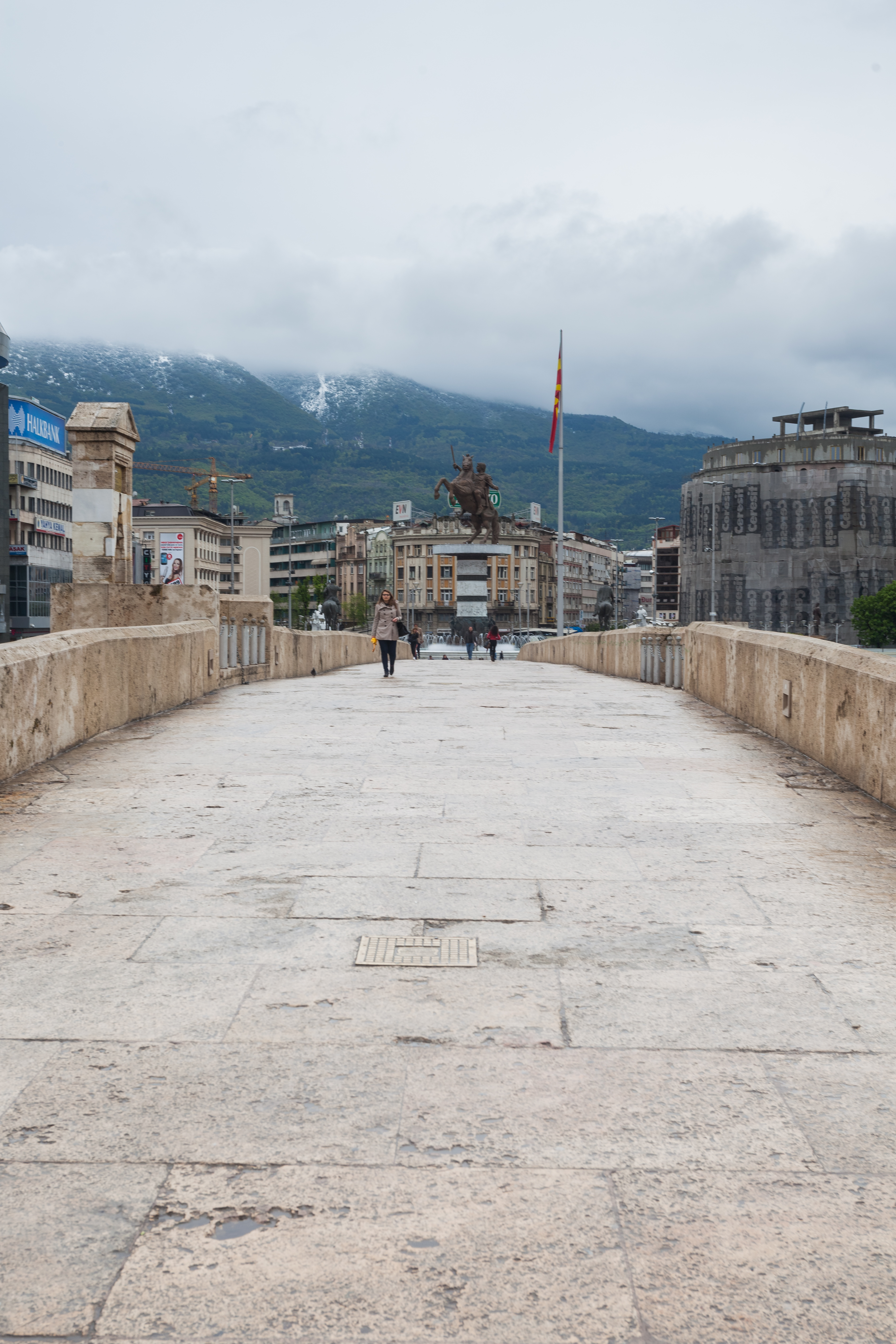
View from the top

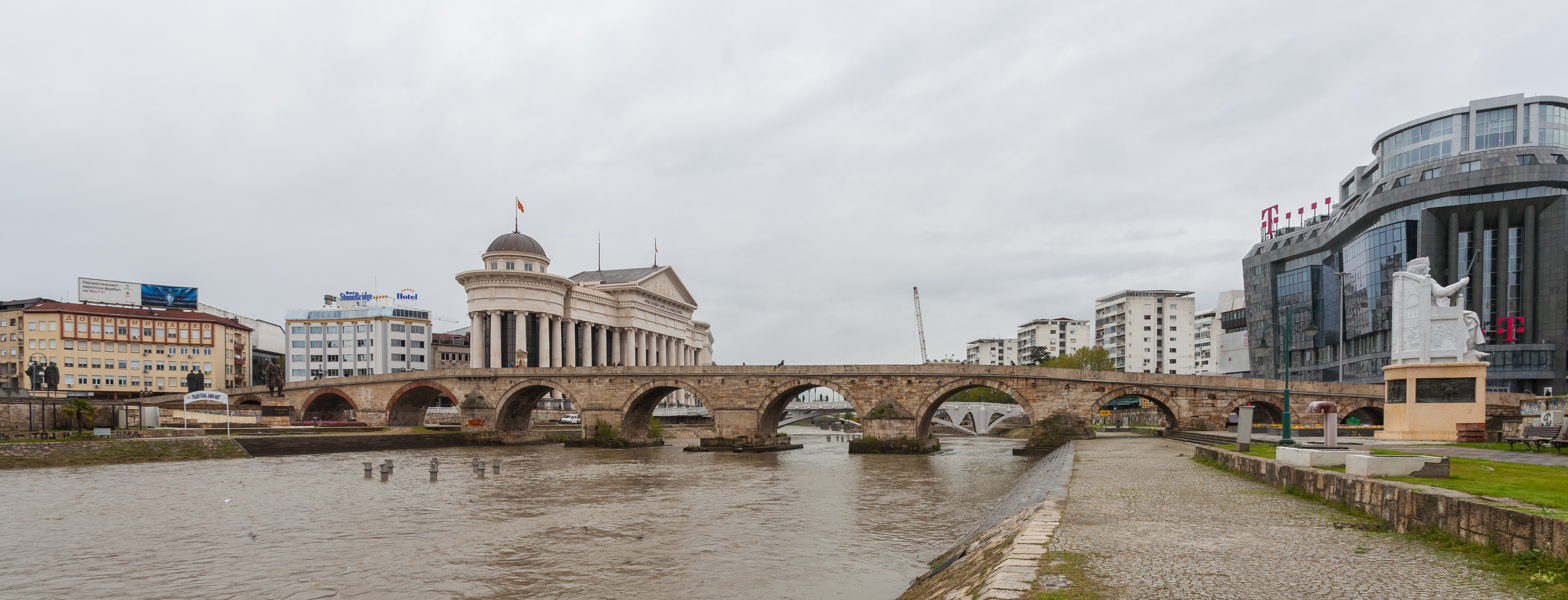
Lateral view

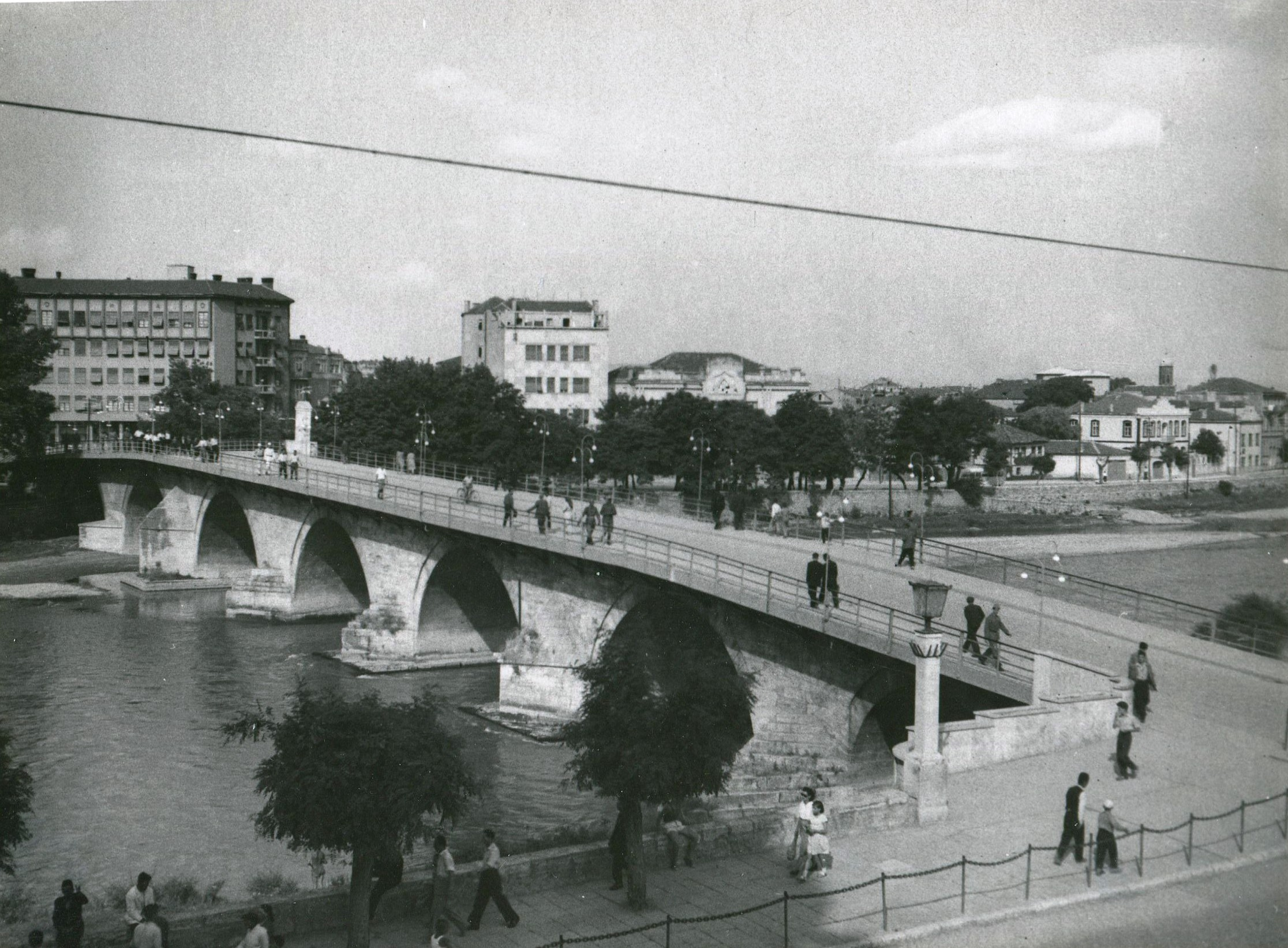
Stone Bridge, photo from the 1950s

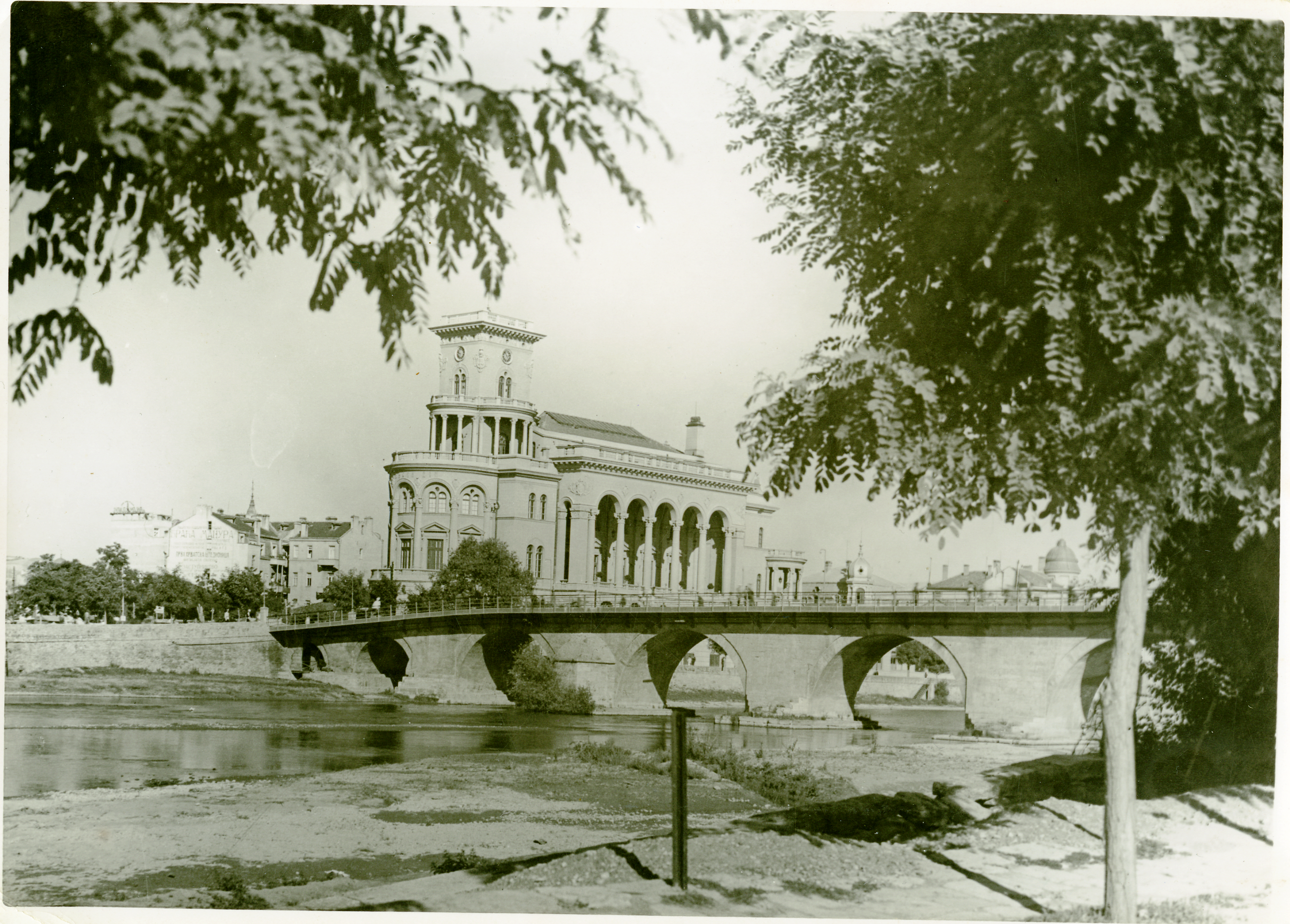
A view of Stone Bridge and the Square

== See also ==
- Ottoman architecture
