= Skopje International Airport =

Airport in Petrovec, North Macedonia

Skopje International Airport Меѓународен аеродром Скопје Aeroporti Ndërkombëtar i Shkupit

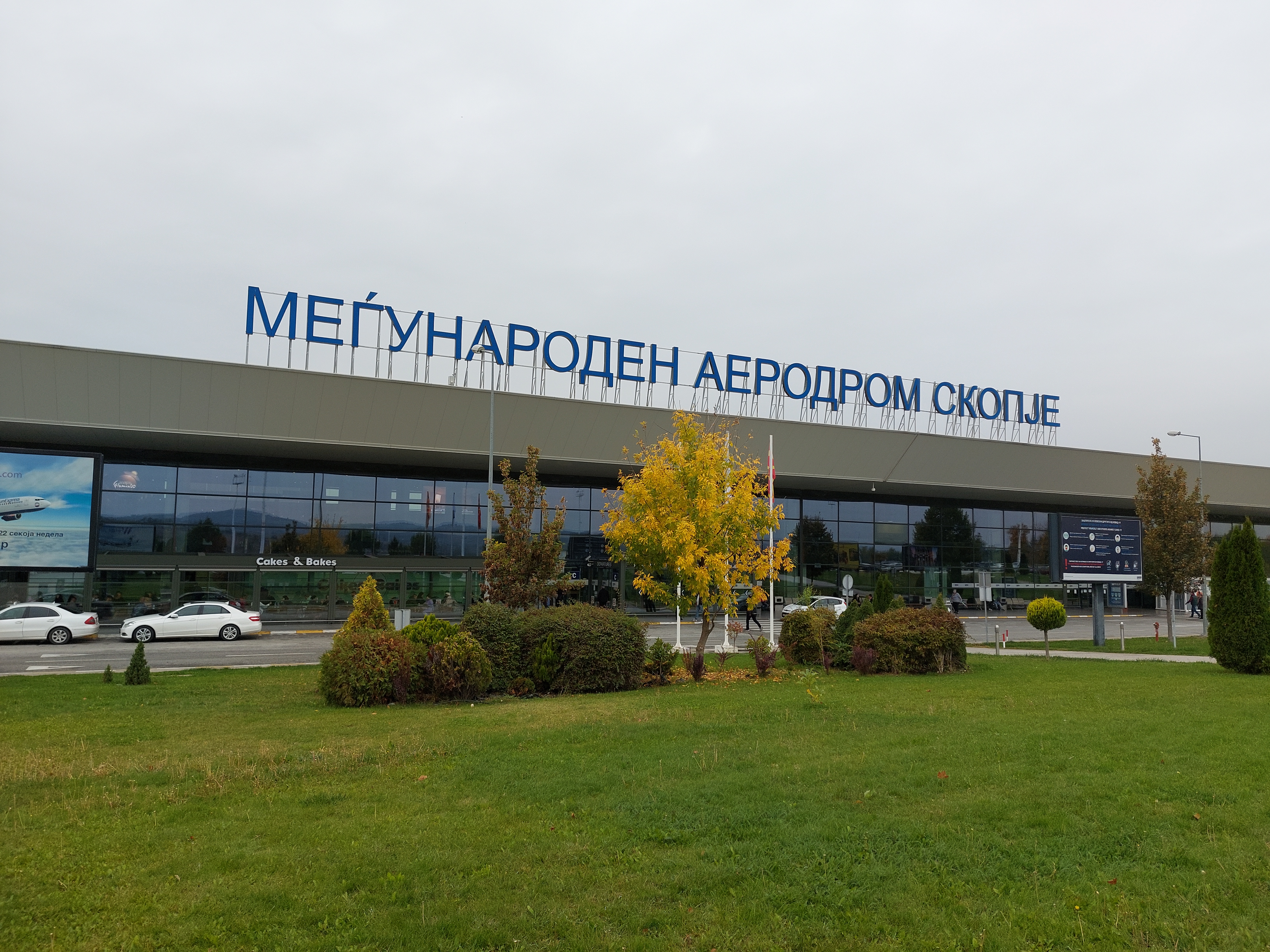
- IATA: SKP; ICAO: LWSK

Summary
- Airport type: Public / Military
- Operator: TAV Airports
- Serves: Skopje
- Location: Petrovec, North Macedonia
- Opened: 1928; 98 years ago
- Operating base for: Wizz Air
- Elevation AMSL: 238 m (781 ft)
- Coordinates: 41°57′40″N 021°37′37″E
- Website: skp.airports.com.mk

Map
- Location within North Macedonia SKP/LWSK (Europe)

Runways
Direction	Length		Surface
Direction	m	ft	Surface
16/34	3,042	9,992	Asphalt

Statistics (2023)
- Passengers: 2,883,378
- Passenger change 2022-23: ▲34.8%
- Aircraft movements: 21,985
- Movements change 2022-23: ▲38%
- Cargo (tons): 3,585
- Cargo change 2022-23: ▲36%
- Source: Republic of North Macedonia AIP at EUROCONTROL

Skopje International Airport (Macedonian: Меѓународен аеродром Скопје, romanized: Megjunaroden aerodrom Skopje, Albanian: Aeroporti Ndërkombëtar i Shkupit) (IATA: SKP, ICAO: LWSK), also known as Skopje Airport and Petrovec Airport, is the larger and busier of the two international airports in North Macedonia, with the other being the St. Paul the Apostle Airport in Ohrid, which is located 170 km (110 mi) southwest from the national capital Skopje.

== History ==
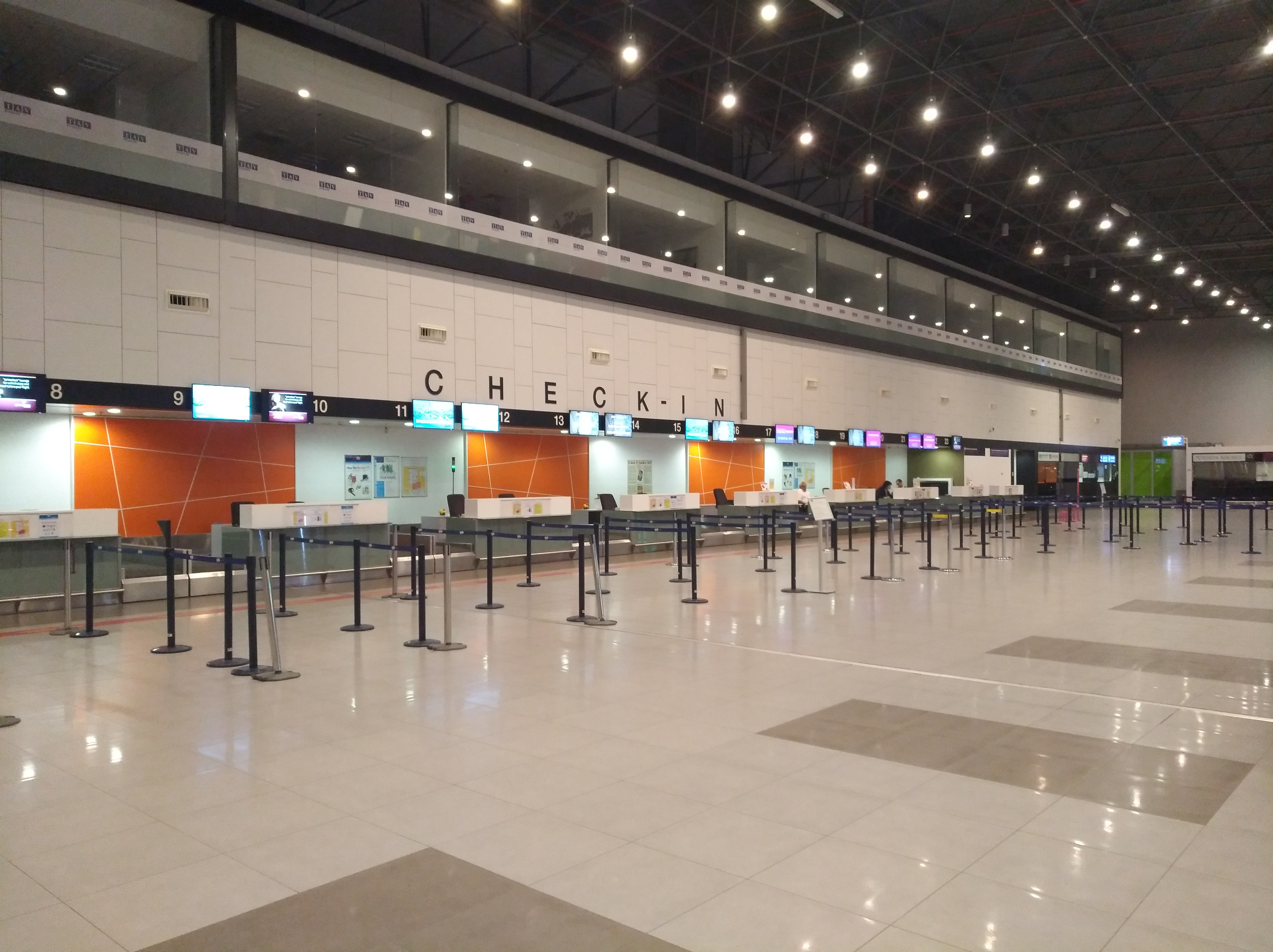
Terminal interior

=== Early years ===
The first flight and landing in Skopje was done in 1912 during the Balkan war by Serbian military aviators. In 1915, Skopje became part of Bulgaria during World War I and a military airport was established there, which was key for Bulgarian and German aviation. The Skopje Airport itself did not exist as a modern civil airport, but as a field aerodrome for military needs. In late September 1918, during the Vardar offensive, Skopje became the airfield of the 1st Section of the 73rd Squadron of the British Royal Army, part of the British and French forces in Italy during World War I. It remained in then South Serbia until August 1919.

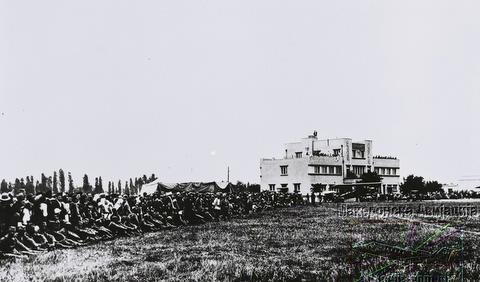
First Terminal building

An airport was built in 1928 near what is today a neighborhood called Aerodrom. The first commercial flights in Skopje were introduced in 1929 when the Yugoslav carrier Aeroput introduced a route linking the city with the capital, Belgrade. A year later, the route was extended to Thessaloniki and further to Athens in 1933. In 1935, Aeroput linked Skopje with Bitola and Niš, and also operated a longer international route linking Vienna and Thessaloniki through Zagreb, Belgrade and Skopje.

After the occupation of the region by Bulgaria during World War II in Yugoslav Macedonia, a military airport was built in the city under the leadership of former IMRO revolutionary Konstantin Popatanasov. This airport near Aerodrom, was destroyed during the bombing of Bulgaria in World War II.

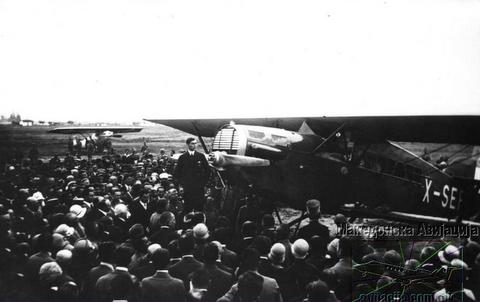
First Plane Landing on Skopje's Airport

After the Second World War, the current airport was built near a neighborhood called Petrovec and Aeroput was replaced by JAT Yugoslav Airlines, which linked Skopje to a number of domestic and international destinations until the dissolution of Yugoslavia in the early 1990s.

=== Development since the 2000s ===
In December 2006, as part of the identity policies called antiquization, the nationalist VMRO-DPMNE-led government of then Republic of Macedonia renamed the airport after Alexander the Great, sparking further controversy in the diplomatic feud with Greece. Thus, the airport was named Skopje Alexander the Great Airport from 2006 to 2018.

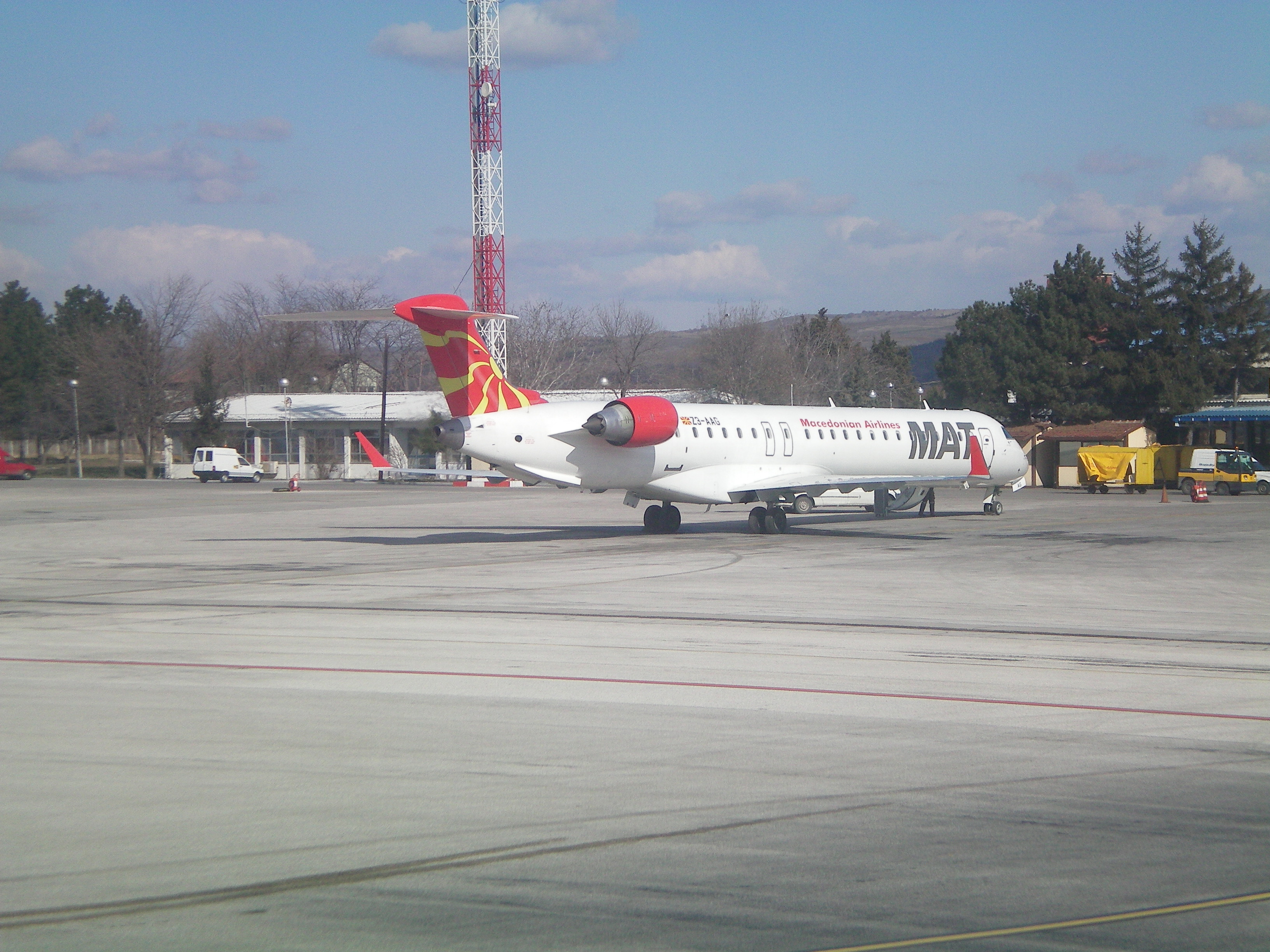
MAT Jet

In 2008, the Macedonian Government signed a contract with the Turkish company TAV Airports Holding for a twenty-year-long concession, during which this company would manage Macedonia's two existing airports, the Skopje Airport and the St. Paul the Apostle Airport in Ohrid.

In September 2011, the new terminal building, extension of the runway, new administrative building, cargo building and new access road with parking facilities were opened.

In February 2018, Alexander the Great was dropped from the airport's name in a move to improve relations with Greece, with the airport being officially renamed Skopje International Airport. A few months before, Aegean Airlines announced future flights between Athens and Skopje, the first flights to Greece for several years.

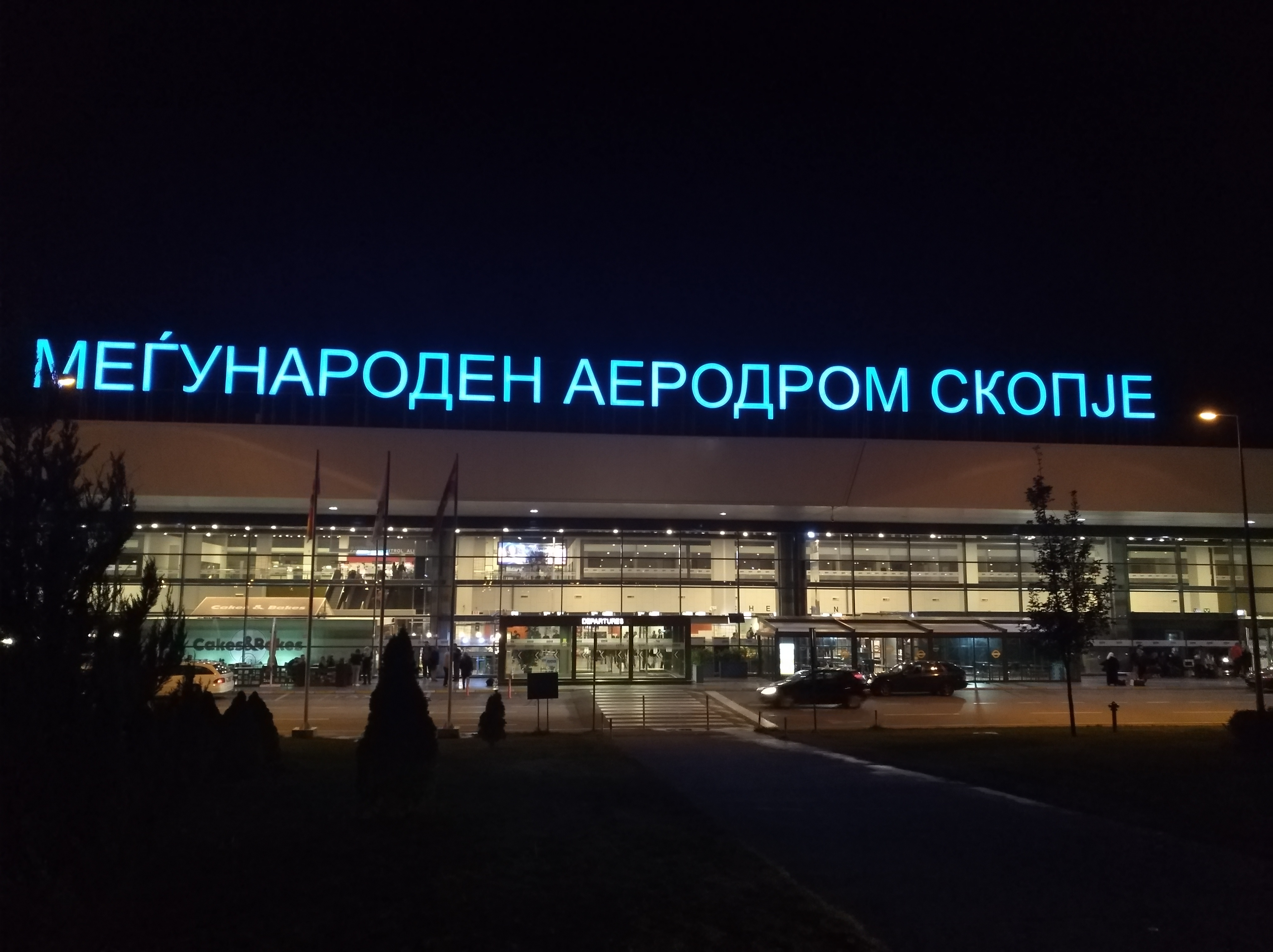
Night View

== Airlines and destinations ==
=== Passenger ===
The following airlines operate regular scheduled and charter flights to and from Skopje:

Airlines	Destinations
Aegean Airlines	Athens
Air Serbia	Belgrade
AJet	Istanbul–Sabiha Gökçen; Seasonal: Adana/Mersin, Ankara, Bodrum, Samsun
Austrian Airlines	Vienna
Chair Airlines	Zürich
Croatia Airlines	Zagreb
easyJet	Geneva
Edelweiss Air	Zürich
Flydubai	Dubai–International (resumes 1 April 2027)
Freebird Airlines	Seasonal: Antalya, Medina
LOT Polish Airlines	Seasonal: Warsaw–Chopin
Norwegian Air Shuttle	Seasonal: Oslo
Pegasus Airlines	Istanbul–Sabiha Gökçen, İzmir; Seasonal: Antalya
SunExpress	Antalya, İzmir
Turkish Airlines	Istanbul
Wizz Air	Barcelona, Bari, Basel/Mulhouse, Berlin, Bologna, Bratislava, Brussels-Charleroi, Budapest, Cologne/Bonn, Dortmund, Eindhoven, Frankfurt-Hahn, Friedrichshafen, Gothenburg, Hamburg, Karlsruhe/Baden-Baden, Ljubljana, London–Luton, Madrid, Malmö, Malta, Memmingen, Milan-Bergamo, Naples, Nuremberg, Oslo, Paris-Beauvais, Prague, Rome-Fiumicino, Sandefjord, Stockholm–Arlanda, Stuttgart, Venice-Treviso; Seasonal: Alghero, Larnaca, Palermo

=== Cargo ===
Airlines	Destinations
DHL Aviation	Leipzig/Halle

== Statistics ==
=== Traffic development ===
The number of passengers has increased since 1990, from 312,492 passengers in that year, to 2,158,258 passengers in 2018, but this was not a steady increase. In 2000 the airport handled 1,005,852 passengers, but in 2001 the number of passengers dropped to 499,789. This was influenced in part by a number of airlines replacing services to Skopje with services to nearby. In 2014 Skopje airport handled 1,208,359 passengers, surpassing one million for the first time since 2000.

Traffic figures at Skopje International Airport
Year	Passengers	Change	Cargo (t)	Change	Aircraft movements	Change
1991	397,660	▲27.3%	1,088	▼41.9%	7,158	▲106.5%
1992	390,025	▼1.9%	1,023	▼6.0%	7,079	▼1.1%
1993	577,425	▲48.0%	4,338	▲324.0%	10,681	▲50.9%
1994	603,447	▲4.5%	6,936	▲59.9%	10,803	▲1.1%
1995	583,053	▼3.4%	10,205	▲47.1%	11,692	▲8.2%
1996	422,598	▼27.5%	3,209	▼68.6%	8,618	▼26.3%
1997	440,988	▲4.4%	4,881	▲52.1%	8,995	▲4.4%
1998	511,784	▲16.1%	5,239	▲7.3%	10,321	▲14.7%
1999	840,985	▲64.3%	11,682	▲123.0%	23,912	▲131.7%
2000	1,005,852	▲19.6%	4,335	▼62.9%	24,234	▲1.3%
2001	499,789	▼50.3%	3,262	▼28.8%	16,673	▼31.2%
2002	520,497	▲4.1%	3,271	▲0.3%	13,725	▼17.7%
2003	500,012	▼3.9%	2,083	▼36.3%	12,428	▼9.4%
2004	497,105	▼0.6%	2,004	▼3.8%	10,940	▼12.0%
2005	525,965	▲5.8%	1,815	▼9.4%	12,101	▲10.6%
2006	547,198	▲4.0%	1,903	▲4.8%	12,637	▲4.4%
2007	626,144	▲14.4%	2,194	▲15.3%	13,085	▲3.5%
2008	658,367	▲5.1%	2,771	▲26.3%	10,666	▼18.5%
2009	602,298	▼8.5%	2,125	▼23.3%	9,871	▼7.5%
2010	716,000	▲18.9%	-	-	-	-
2011	759,918	▲6.1%	2,376	-	10,977	-
2012	828,831	▲9.1%	2,297	▼3.3%	10,418	▼5.1%
2013	984,407	▲18.8%	2,504	▲9.0%	11,276	▲8.2%
2014	1,208,359	▲22.7%	3,422	▲36.7%	13,210	▲17.2%
2015	1,452,465	▲20.2%	2,649	▼22.6%	14,451	▲9.4%
2016	1,649,374	▲13.6%	3,090	▲10.9%	15,407	▲6.6%
2017	1,868,272	▲13.3%	2,744	▼11.2%	16,680	▲8.3%
2018	2,158,258	▲15.5%	3,298	▲20.2%	18,188	▲9.0%
2019	2,360,400	▲9,4%	3,407	▲3.3%	19,177	▲5.4%
2020	709,241	▼70.0%	2,132	▼37.4%	7,625	▼60.2%
2021	1,266,230	▲78.5%	3,039	▲42.5%	12,056	▲58.1%
2022	2,139,191	▲68.9%	2,635	▼13.3%	15,923	▲32.1%
2023	2,883,378	▲34.8%	3,585	▲36%	21,985	▲38%
2024	2,954,568	▲2.5%				
2025	3,211,419	▲8.7%				

=== Busiest routes (2022) ===
City	Airport(s)	Airline(s)	Market Share
Istanbul	Istanbul Airport and Sabiha Gökçen Airport	Pegasus Airlines, Turkish Airlines	13.1%
Basel Switzerland, Mulhouse France, Freiburg Germany	Basel/Mulhouse Airport	Wizz Air	6.3%
Vienna	Vienna Airport	Austrian Airlines	6.2%
Zürich	Zurich Airport	Chair Airlines, Edelweiss Air	6.2%
Antalya	Antalya	AnadoluJet, Corendon Airlines, SunExpress	4.2%
Memmingen	Memmingen	Wizz Air	4%
Dortmund	Dortmund	Wizz Air	4%
Cologne	Cologne/Bonn	Wizz Air	3.1%

=== Largest airlines (2022) ===
Rank	Carrier	Market share
1	Wizz Air	59,3%
2	Turkish Airlines	11.0% (incl. AnadoluJet)
3	Pegasus Airlines	6.7%
4	Austrian Airlines	6.2%
5	Chair Airlines	4.9%

=== Largest country markets (2022) ===
Rank	Country	Market share
1	Germany	24%
2	Turkey	19.1%
3	Switzerland	14.2%
4	Sweden	6.9%
5	Austria	6.2%

== Ground transportation ==
Taxis to Skopje are available. Private transfer services are also offered by various companies. There is also a bus service (WTransporter) linking the airport and the city.

== Incidents and accidents ==
- On 24 July 1992, an Antonov 12BK of Volga-Dnepr Airlines crashed at the mountainous Lisec village near Tetovo, on approach to Skopje Airport, after the crew strayed off course while trying to circumnavigate a thunderstorm, because the DME at Skopje Airport was inoperative. All 8 occupants died and the plane was written off.
- On 5 March 1993, Palair Macedonian Airlines Flight 301, a Fokker 100 bound for Zürich, crashed seconds after takeoff from runway 34. Investigation into the accident determined the cause of the accident to be the failure of the flight crew to have the aircraft deiced before departure. Of the 97 people on board, 83 died.
- On 12 January 2008, a Mil Mi-17 of the Macedonian Air Force, from Mostar en route to Skopje Airport, crashed on a hill near Katlanovsko Blato in dense fog and burned out. All 11 occupants died and the helicopter was written off.
- On 13 February 2009, Austrian Airlines Flight OS780, Bombardier Dash 8 Q400 scheduled flight from Skopje to Vienna, failed to retract landing gear after take-off and performed an emergency landing on Skopje Airport.
- On 14 November 2011, a private flight Socata TBM700N (TBM850), from Maastricht Aachen Airport to Skopje, hit several treetops and approach light while landing and missed the extended asphalt of the runway and touched down on grass. All five occupants escaped unharmed. The plane received substantial damage and was sent to Daher-Socata at Tarbes-Lourdes-Pyrénées Airport for repairs.
- On 11 February 2012, Czech Airlines Flight 848, a Boeing 737-55S scheduled flight from Prague to Skopje, made an emergency landing at Skopje, because of reported smoke that came out of the aircraft. Airport firefighters and ambulance were alarmed. The plane had a minor damage and all passengers escaped uninjured.
- On 6 September 2016, a private Piper PA-34-200T Seneca II crashed near Vetersko, Veles while landing in Skopje, killing all 6 on board. The aircraft was written off.

== See Also ==
- List of airports in North Macedonia
