= Centar Municipality, Skopje =

Municipality of North Macedonia

Municipality of Centar Општина Центар
- City Municipality (Urban)
- Flag

- Location within North Macedonia
- Coordinates: 41°59′42″N 21°25′30″E
- Country: North Macedonia
- Region: Skopje
- Municipal seat: Centar

Government
  - Mayor: Goran Gerasimovski (SDSM)

Area
  - Total: 7.52 km^{2} (2.90 sq mi)

Population
  - Total: 43,893
- Time zone: UTC+1 (CET)

Centar (Macedonian: Центар) is the central municipality of the ten municipalities that compose the city of Skopje, the capital of North Macedonia. Centar is home to the Assembly of North Macedonia.

== Geography ==
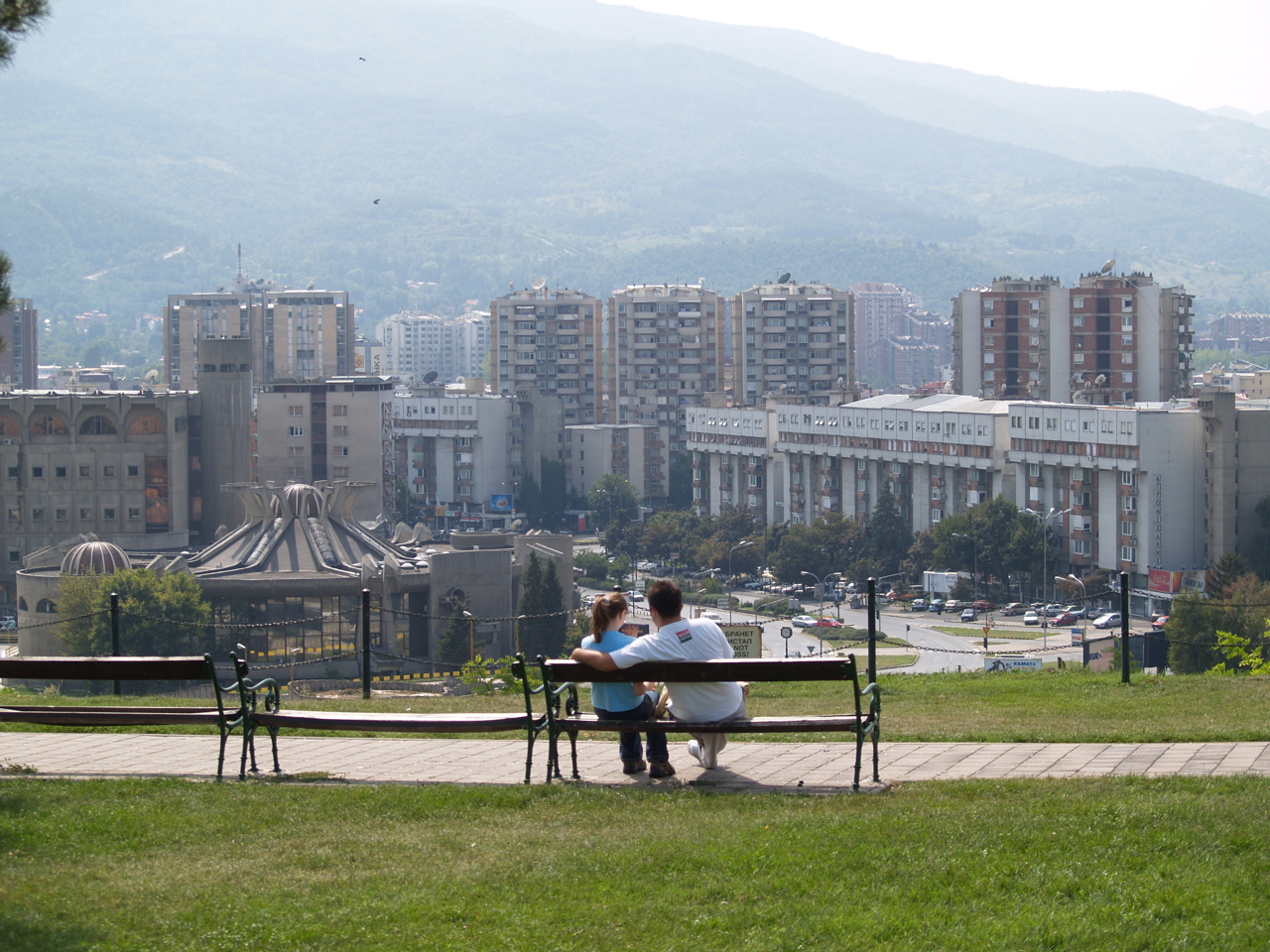
Centar Municipality, view from Skopje Fortress

The Vardar River runs on the edge of the municipality along the border with Čair Municipality. Vodno Mountain overlooks Centar. The municipality's total area is 7.52 km^{2}. Centar borders several other municipalities including: Karpoš Municipality to the west, Čair Municipality to the northeast, Aerodrom Municipality to the southeast, and Kisela Voda Municipality to the south.

== Demographics ==
According to the 2002 Macedonia census, the municipality had 45,412 inhabitants. According to the 2021 North Macedonia census, this municipality had 43,893 inhabitants. Ethnic groups in the municipality include:

	2002		2021	
	Number	%	Number	%
TOTAL	45,412	100	43,893	100
Macedonians	38,778	85.39	33,731	76.85
Serbs	2,037	4.49	1,301	2.96
Albanians	1,465	3.23	1,100	2.51
Roma	974	2.14	622	1.42
Vlachs	459	1.01	552	1.26
Turks	492	1.08	548	1.25
Bosniaks	108	0.24	171	0.39
Other / Undeclared / Unknown	1,099	2.42	855	1.94
Persons for whom data are taken from administrative sources			5,013	11.42

== Sports ==
The Toše Proeski Arena, the national football stadium, is located in the municipality and hosts home games of FK Vardar and FK Rabotnički.
