= Kisela Voda Municipality =

Municipality of North Macedonia

Coordinates: 41.934074°N 21.480690°E

Municipality of Kisela Voda Општина Кисела Вода
- City municipality (Urban)
- Flag Coat of arms

- Location within North Macedonia
- Country: North Macedonia
- Region: Skopje
- Municipal seat: Kisela Voda

Government
  - Mayor: Beti Stamenkoska-Trajkoska (VMRO-DPMNE)

Area
  - Total: 46.86 km^{2} (18.09 sq mi)

Population
  - Total: 61,965
  - Density: 1,242/km^{2} (3,220/sq mi)
- Time zone: UTC+1 (CET)
- Postal code: 1050
- Car Plates: SK
- Website: http://www.kiselavoda.gov.mk

Kisela Voda (Macedonian: Кисела Вода meaning "mineral water") is one of the ten municipalities that make up the city of Skopje, the capital of North Macedonia.

== Geography ==
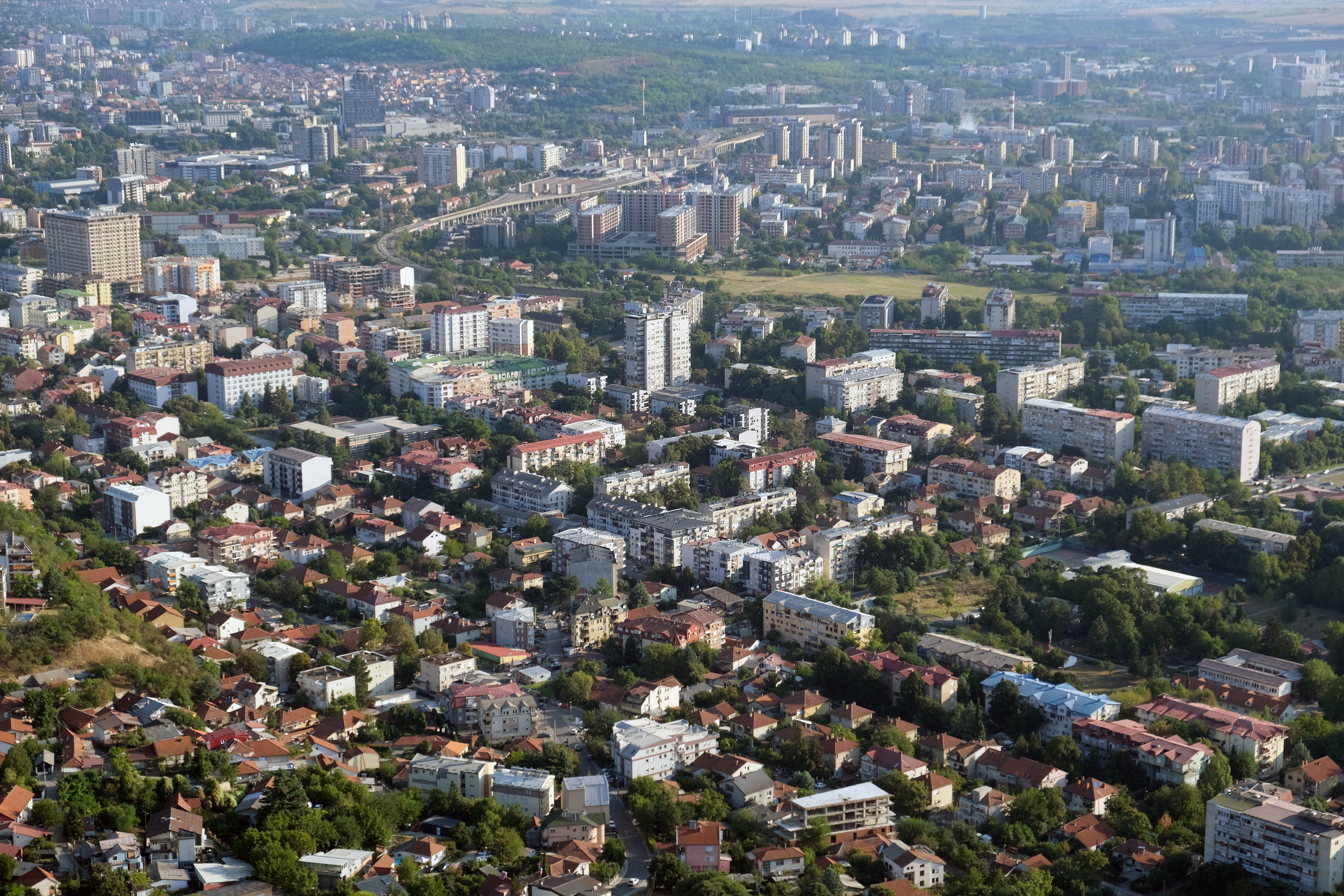
Kisela Voda seen from Vodno.

The municipality borders Karpoš Municipality to the northwest, Centar Municipality to the north, Aerodrom Municipality to the northeast, Studeničani Municipality to the south, and Sopište Municipality to the west.

== Demographics ==
According to the 2002 Macedonia census, this municipality has 125,379 inhabitants, including parts that were later moved to Aerodrom. According to the 2021 North Macedonia census, this municipality has 61,965 inhabitants. Ethnic groups in the municipality include:

	2002		2021	
	Number	%	Number	%
TOTAL	57,236	100	61,965	100
Macedonians	52,478	91.69	52,030	83.97
Serbs	1,426	2.49	953	1.54
Turks	460	0.7	732	1.18
Vlachs	647	1.13	636	1.03
Bosniaks	425	0.74	581	0.94
Roma	716	1.25	467	0.75
Albanians	250	0.44	418	0.67
Other / Undeclared / Unknown	834	1.46	709	1.14
Persons for whom data are taken from administrative sources			5,439	8.78

== Schools ==
Krume Kepeski Kiril Pejcinovic Kuzman Josifovski Pitu Partenij Zografski High school Vasil Antevski Dren Nevena Georgieva Dunja

== Twin Municipalities ==
- Bahçelievler, Istanbul Turkey
- Zvezdara, Belgrade Serbia
