= Architecture of North Macedonia =

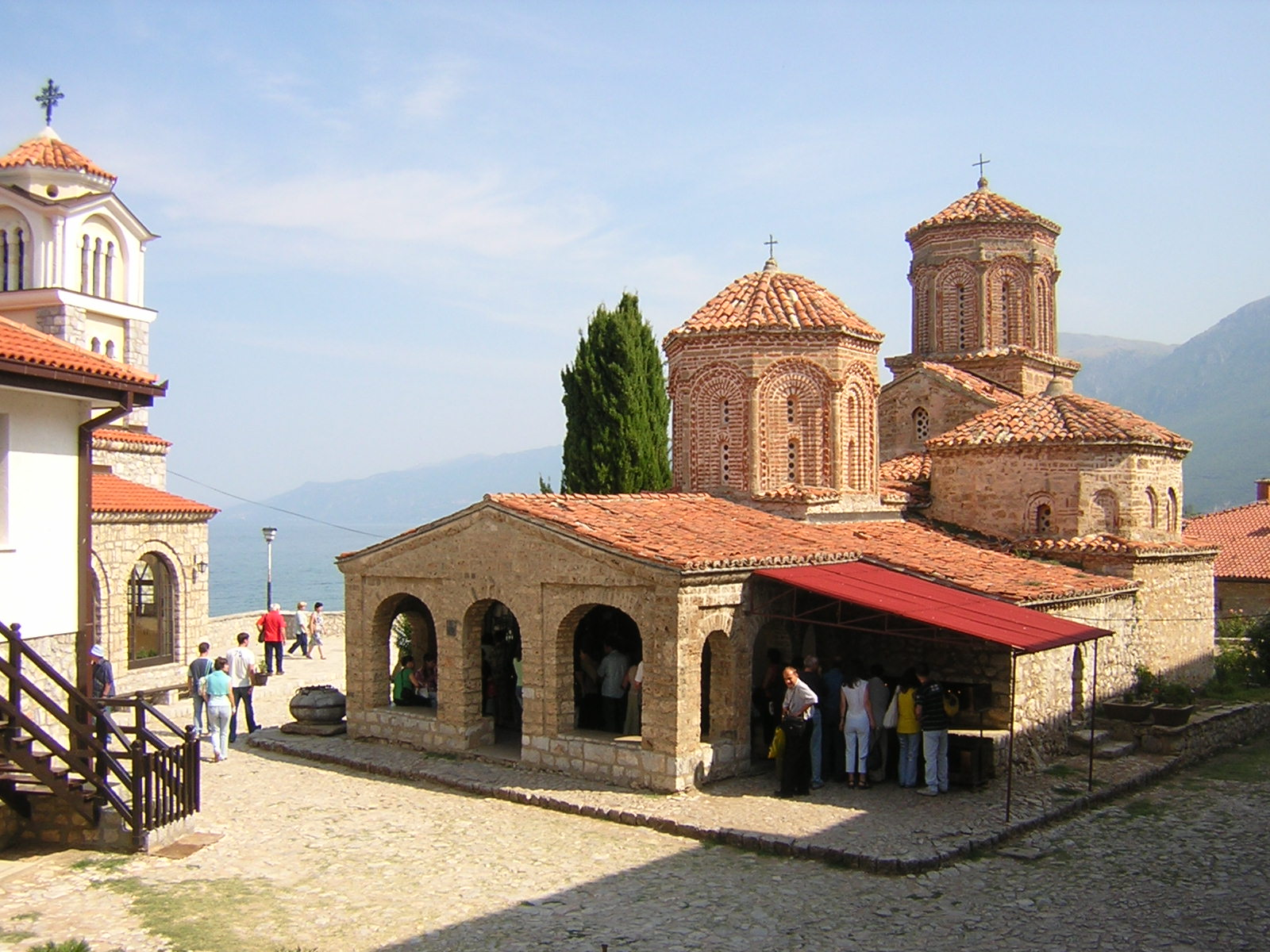
The Monastery of St. Naum, one of the examples of Medieval Bulgarian architecture in North Macedonia

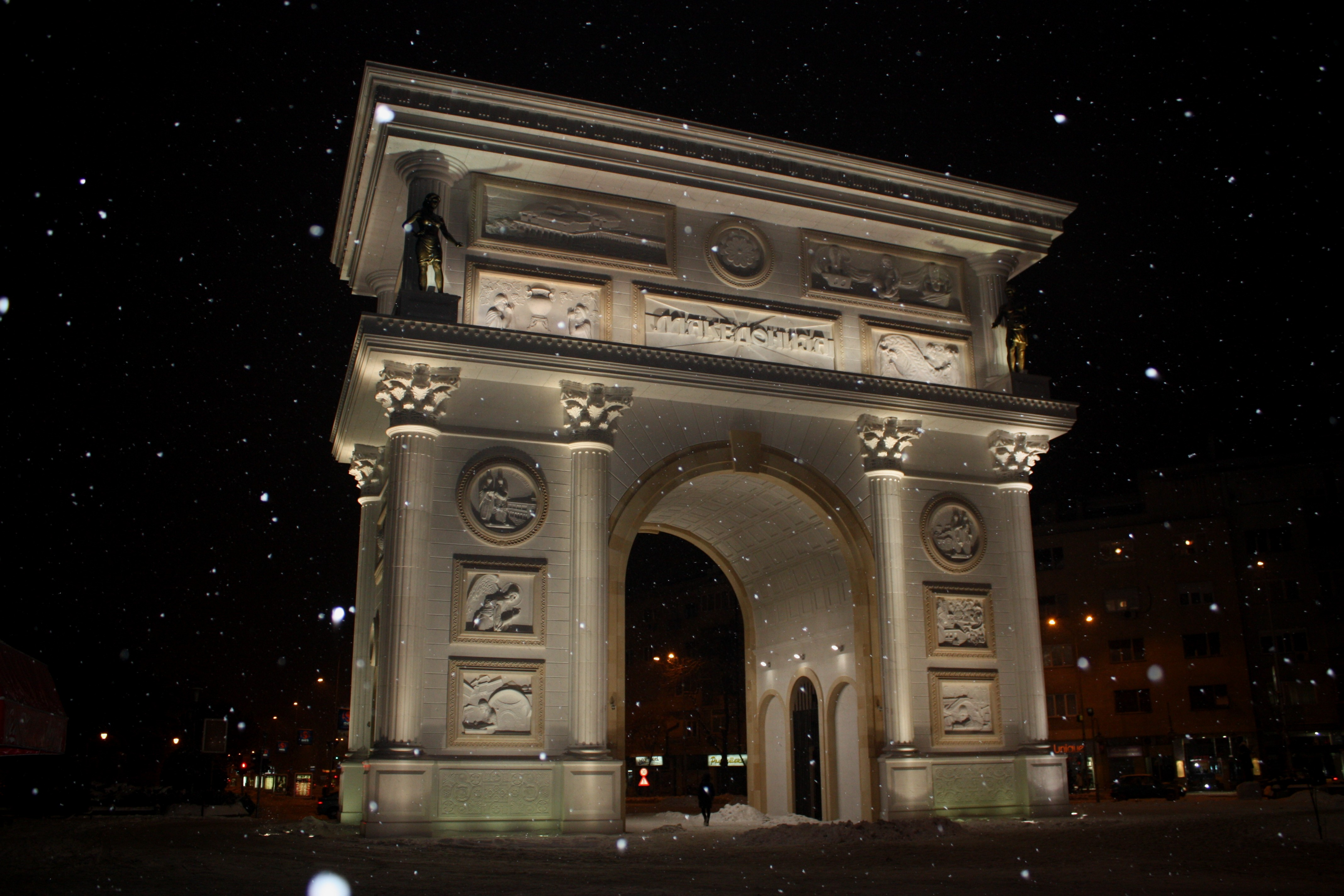
Porta Macedonia in Skopje

The groups of people who have settled or controlled the territory of modern-day North Macedonia have influenced the country in many ways, one of the most visible being architecture. These groups of people include the Paionians, Illyrians, Ancient Macedonians, Romans, Byzantines, Bulgarians, Serbs, Ottomans, Yugoslavs, and ethnic Macedonians.

== Early architecture ==
The earliest example of architectural activity in North Macedonia date from the Neolithic and consist of structures associated with Megalith culture. Kokino is the fourth oldest megalithic observatory in the world. The site consists of rocks crafted in a way that lets one observe celestial objects.

== Architecture of Ancient Macedonia ==
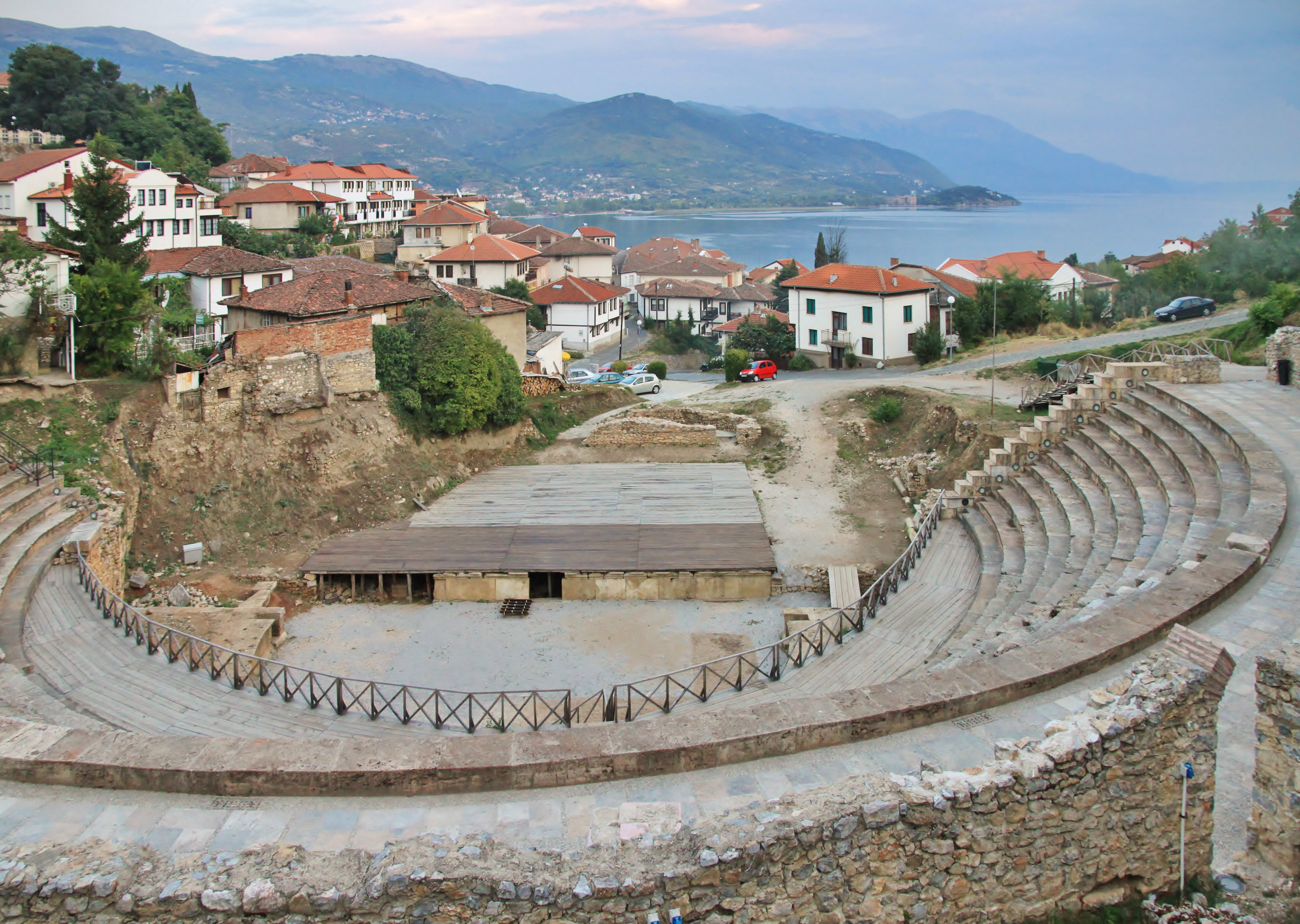
Ancient Theatre of Ohrid

Remnants of the architecture from the times of the ancient Macedonian Kingdom are scattered throughout North Macedonia, especially in the south of the former territory of Macedon.

Heraclea Lyncestis, founded in the middle of the 4th century BC, was an important strategical town as it bordered Epirus to the west and the Paeonian kingdoms to the north. Roman architecture dominates the site today because of the level of the excavations which are exposing the layers from the Roman times.

The Ancient Theatre in present-day Ohrid was built during the 1st century BC. It was part of the ancient town of Lychnidos. It is reconstructed and in use today. Its location between two hills that surround it keep it protected from winds that could interfere with acoustics during performances.

== Roman architecture ==
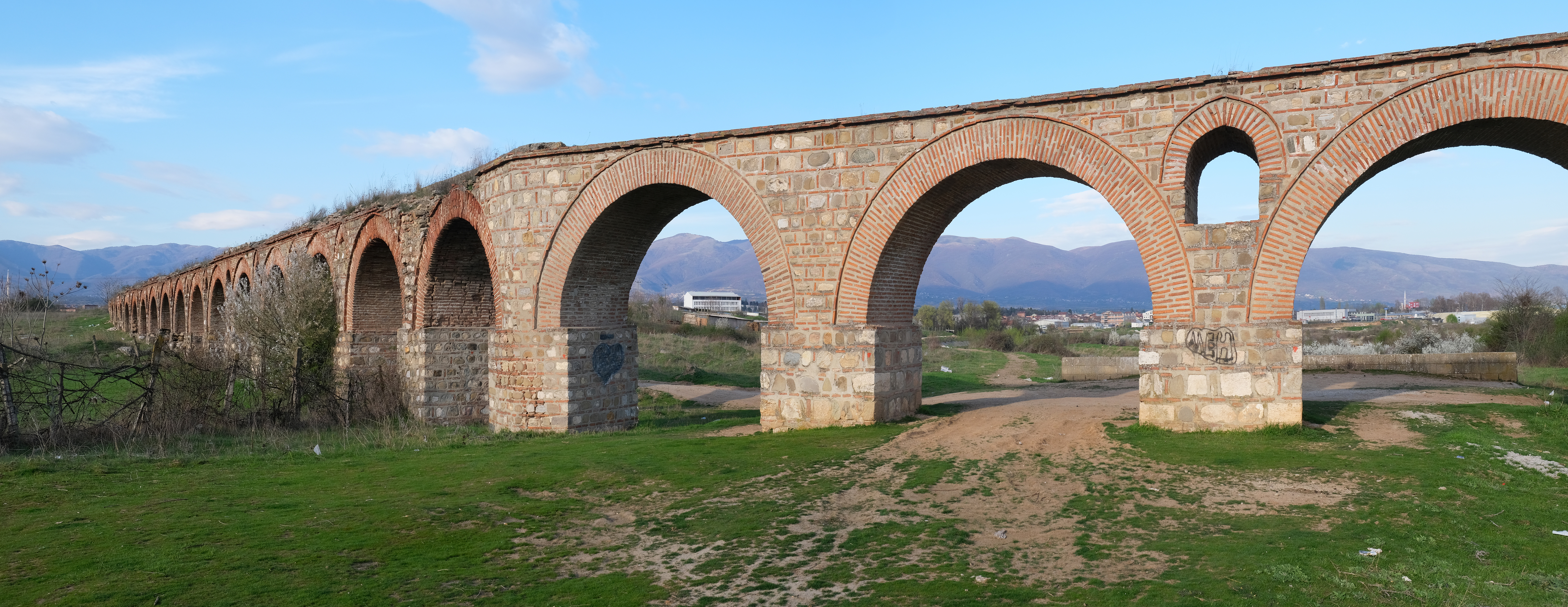
The Skopje Aqueduct

Roman architecture is scattered throughout the country. Skopje is home to a few examples of this type of architecture. One is the Skopje Aqueduct, the only aqueduct in North Macedonia. It consists of 55 stone arches. Another example is Scupi. Although not much remains of this archaeological site, burial grounds and a theatre are somewhat visible.

Although it was founded by the Ancient Macedonians, most of the remains of Heraclea Lyncestis are from Roman occupation. These remains include a portico and a large theatre.

Other examples of Roman architecture in North Macedonia includes the many Roman ruins in and around the town of Strumica. One of the largest is a well-preserved Roman thermae, built during Late Antiquity.

== Medieval Bulgarian and Serbian architecture ==
On and off from 893 A.D. to the 13th century, some or all of today's North Macedonia had been controlled by the First Bulgarian Empire and the Second Bulgarian Empire. This resulted in buildings concentrated particularly in Ohrid which was the capital of the First Bulgarian Empire from 968/972 to 1018 AD. This includes historic churches and monasteries like the Church of Saint Sophia, the Monastery of Saint Naum and the Church of Sts. Clement and Panteleimon.

By 1345, king Stefan Dušan of the Serbian Empire had taken over half of the Balkans including the region of Macedonia and declared himself the new Caesar. The Serbs ruled the territory of modern North Macedonia until end of the 14th century. During their rule, they built notable architecture such as Psača Monastery, Markovi Kuli, and the Church of Saint George.

== Byzantine architecture ==
Byzantine architecture is one of the most prominent forms of architecture in North Macedonia. It is mostly seen in churches and monasteries, such as the Treskavec monastery near Prilep.

== Ottoman architecture ==
The Ottomans controlled the land of present-day Macedonia for about five centuries. They left their mark with the many mosques and other Islamic buildings they constructed.

Ottoman architecture is predominant in some parts of Skopje, especially the city's old town. Mustafa Pasha Mosque is one of the most famous Ottoman buildings in North Macedonia. Built in 1492, the mosque is square in shape and the diameter of the dome is 16 meters. The pillars of the porch are decorated by stalactite decorations that are typical of Ottoman architecture.

Ottoman architecture can also been seen in Bitola and Tetovo.

== 19th-century architecture ==
Examples of neoclassical or baroque architecture are throughout the country but can be rare and limited to one structure per city. Neoclassical architecture can be seen in Skopje (Ristiḱ Palace). The exception to this pattern is in Bitola. Širok Sokak street is filled with neoclassical and baroque architecture and a Gothic Catholic church.

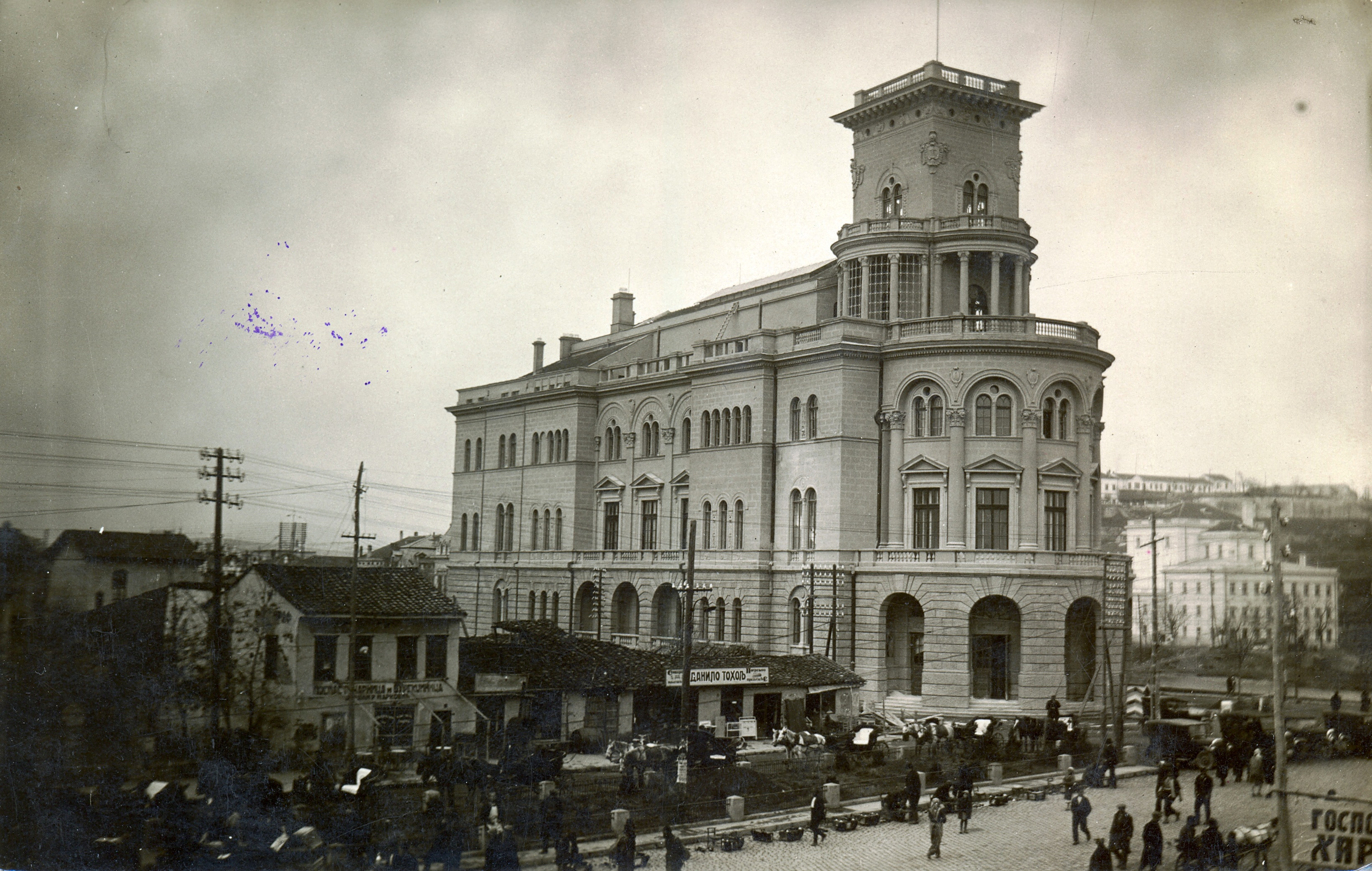
Skopje center in the first half of 20th century

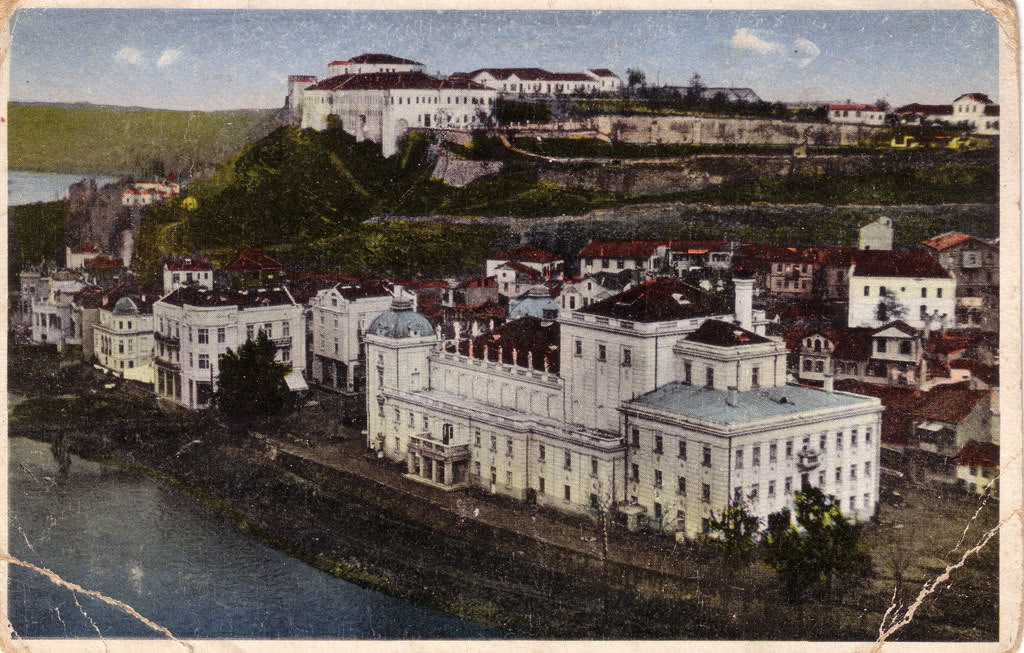
Skopje's National Theatre and Kale Fortress before the 1963 earthquake

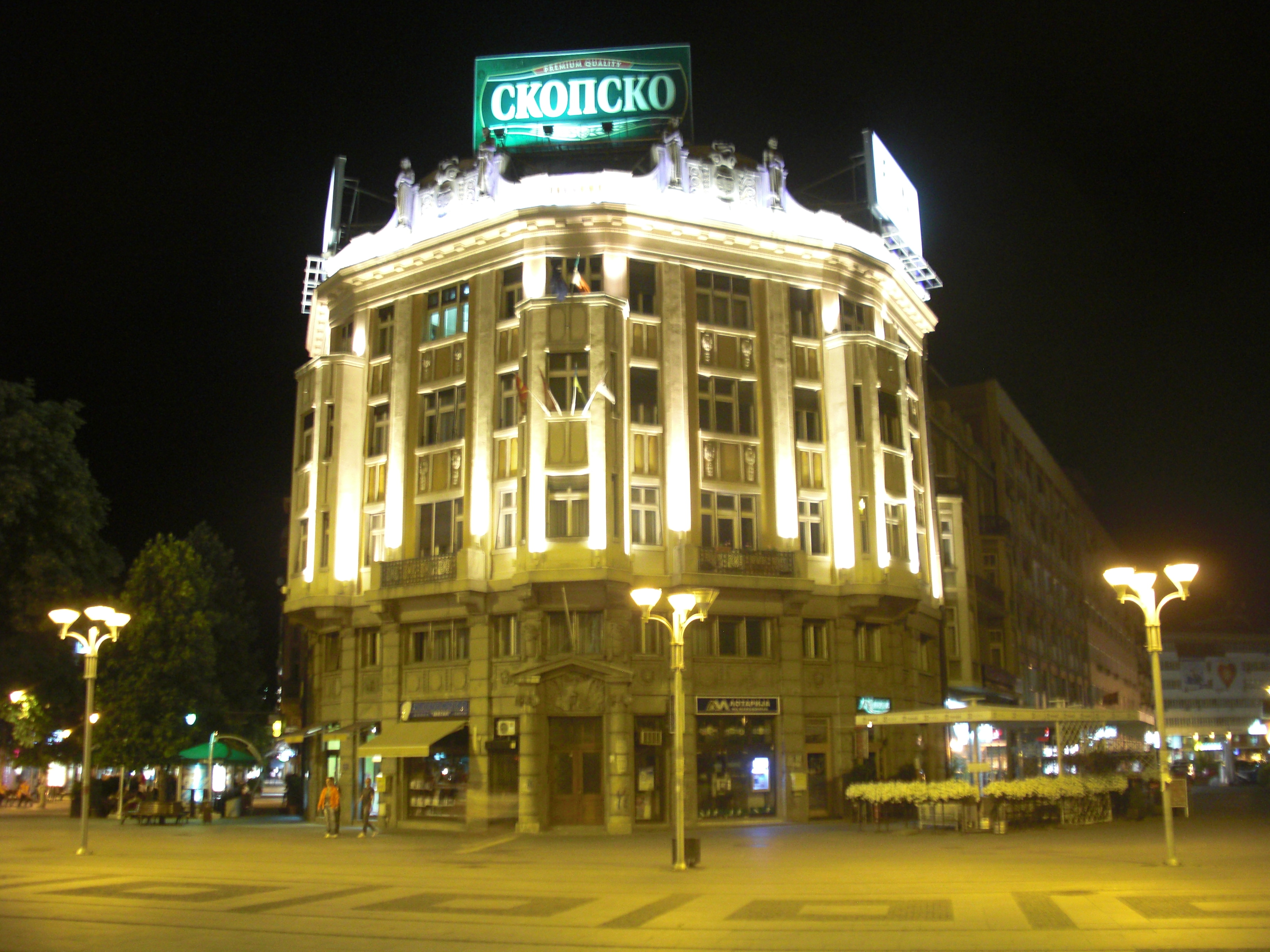
The Ristiḱ Palace in Skopje

== Yugoslav period ==
=== Interwar modernism ===
Yugoslav architecture emerged in the first decades of the 20th century before the establishment of the state; during this period a number of South Slavic creatives, enthused by the possibility of statehood, organized a series of art exhibitions in Serbia in the name of a shared Slavic identity. Following governmental centralization after the 1918 creation of the Kingdom of Yugoslavia, this initial bottom-up enthusiasm began to fade. Yugoslav architecture became more and more dictated by an increasingly concentrated national authority which sought to establish a unified state identity.

Beginning in the 1920s, Yugoslav architects began to advocate for architectural modernism, viewing the style as the logical extension of progressive national narratives. The Group of Architects of the Modern Movement, an organization founded in 1928 by architects Branislav Đ Kojić, Milan Zloković, Jan Dubovy, and Dusan Babic, pushed for the widespread adoption of modern architecture as the "national" style of Yugoslavia to transcend regional differences. Despite these shifts, differing relationships to the West made the adoption of modernism inconsistent in Yugoslavia during WWII; while the westernmost republics of Croatia and Slovenia were familiar with Western influence and eager to adopt modernism, long-Ottoman Bosnia remained more resistant to do so. Of all Yugoslavian cities, Belgrade has the highest concentration of modernist structures.

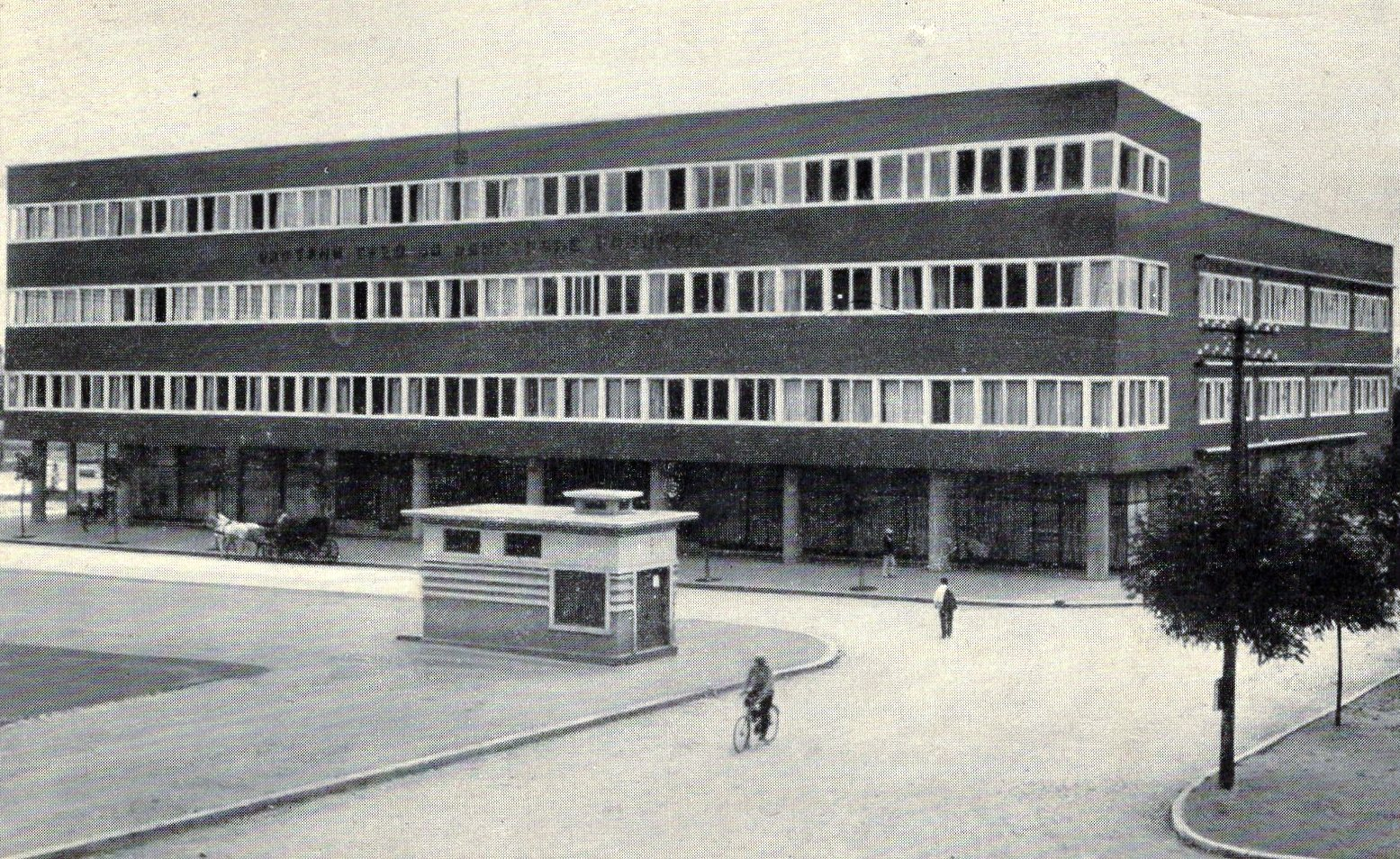
The Skopje City Hospital was designed in 1930 by Drago Ebler

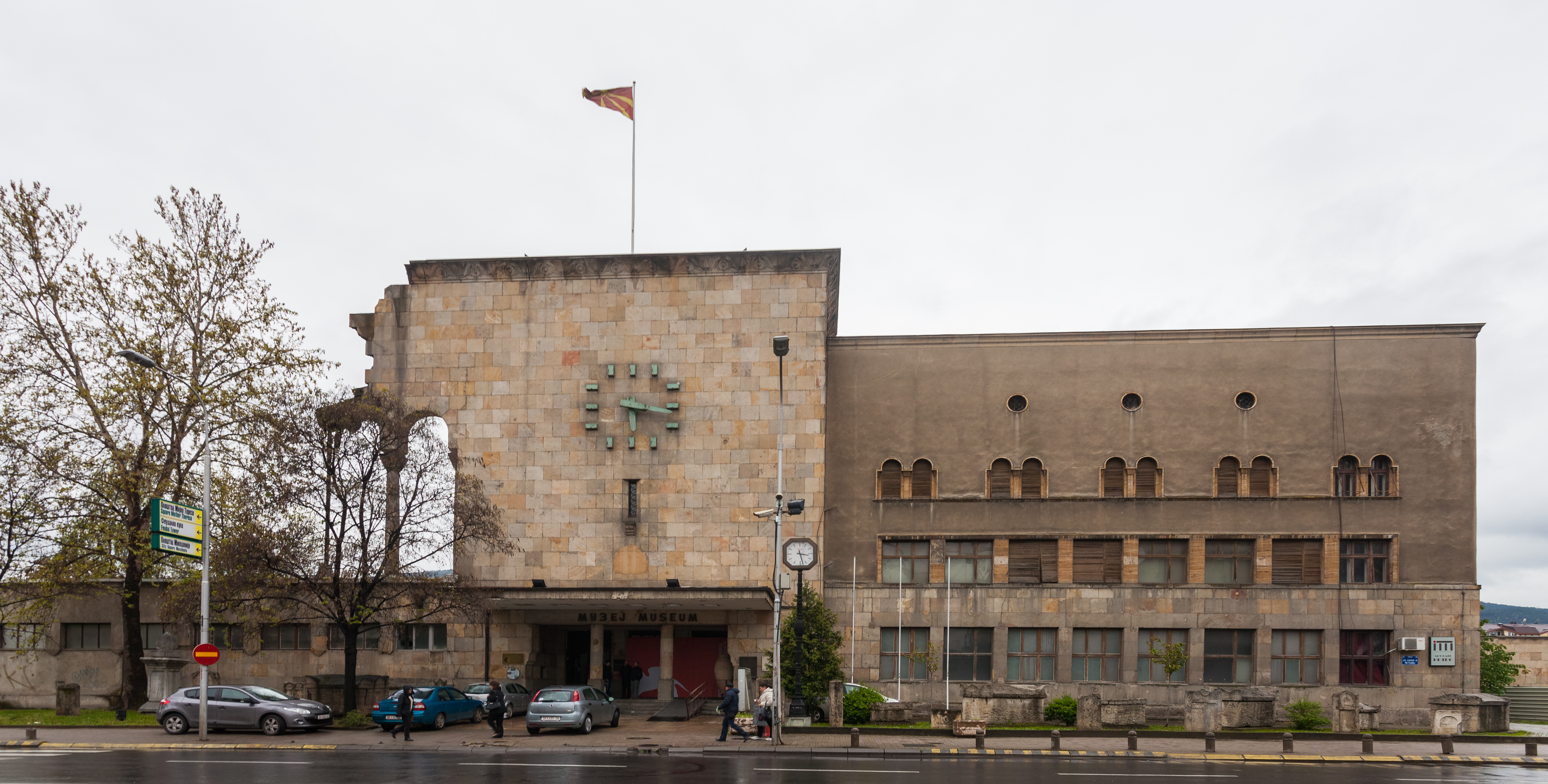
Old Skopje Train Station

=== Socialist realism and creation of national architecture (1945–48) ===
Immediately following World War II in Yugoslavia, the Macedonian national architecture was established in the Socialist Republic of Macedonia after its creation as part of SFR Yugoslavia. Macedonian architects then mostly relied on Yugoslav and Bulgarian scholarly works. They were also educated in Yugoslav academic institutions. Yugoslavia's brief association with the Eastern Bloc ushered in a short period of socialist realism. Centralization within the communist model led to the abolishment of private architectural practices and the state control of the profession. During this period, the governing Communist Party condemned modernism as "bourgeois formalism," a move that caused friction among the nation's pre-war modernist architectural elite.

=== Socialist modernism ===
Socialist realist architecture in Yugoslavia came to an abrupt end with Josip Broz Tito's 1948 split with Stalin. In the following years the nation turned increasingly to the West, returning to the modernism that had characterized pre-war Yugoslav architecture. During this era, modernist architecture came to symbolize the nation's break from the USSR (a notion that later diminished with the growing acceptability of modernism in the Eastern Bloc).

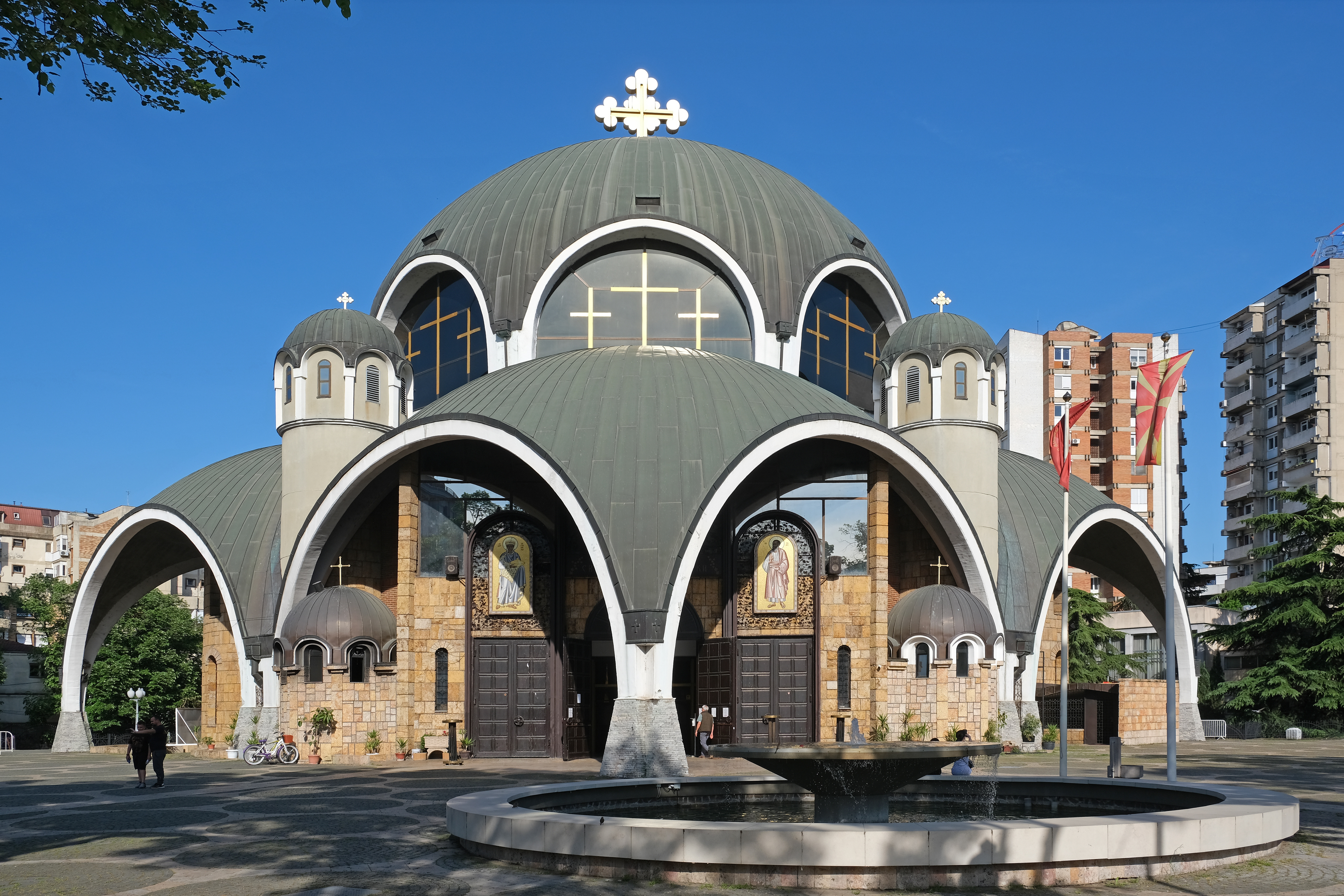
Orthodox Cathedral Saint Clement of Ohrid Slavko Brezoski, Skopje, 1972

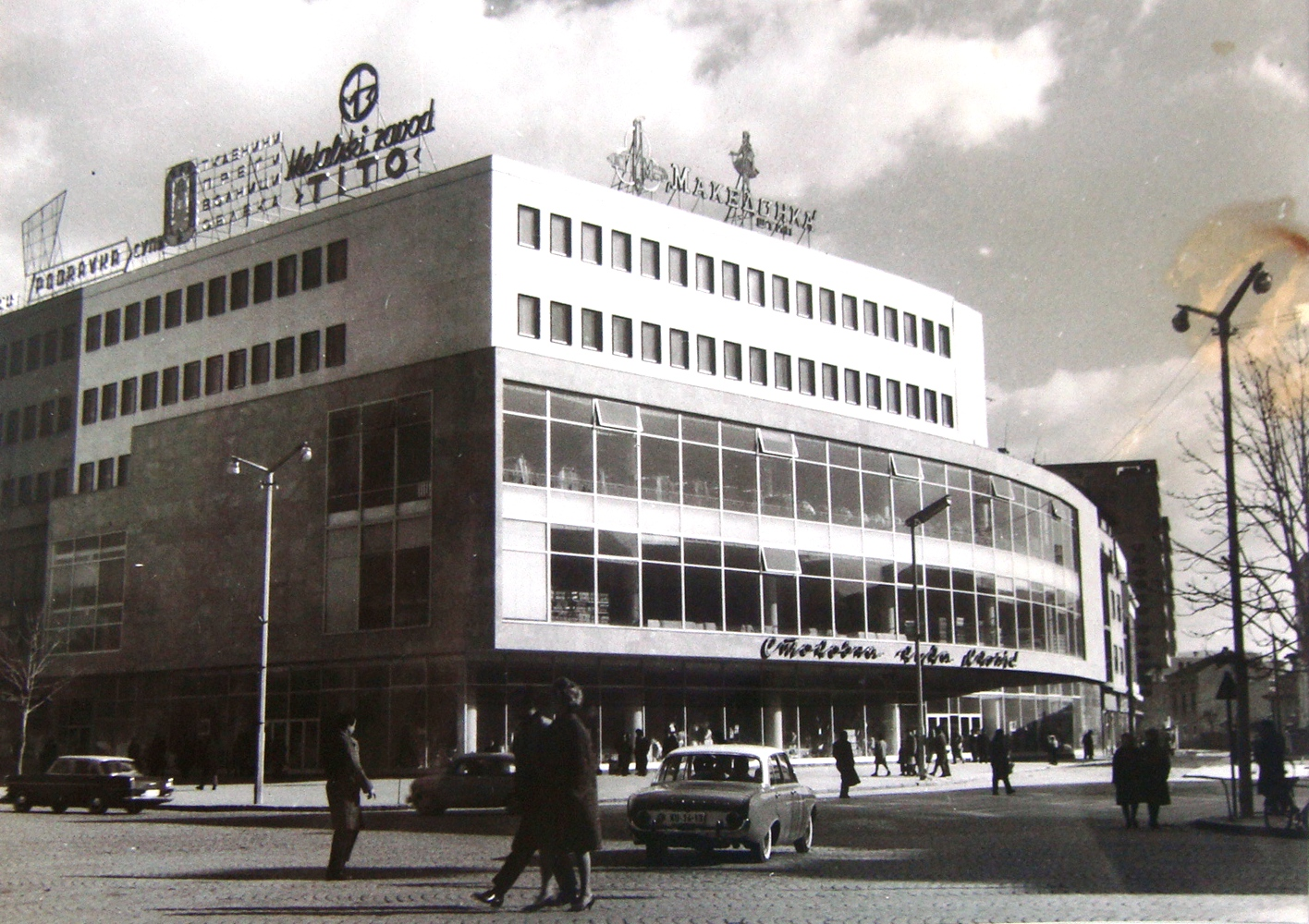
Stokovna Kukja by Slavko Brezoski, Skopje, 1962

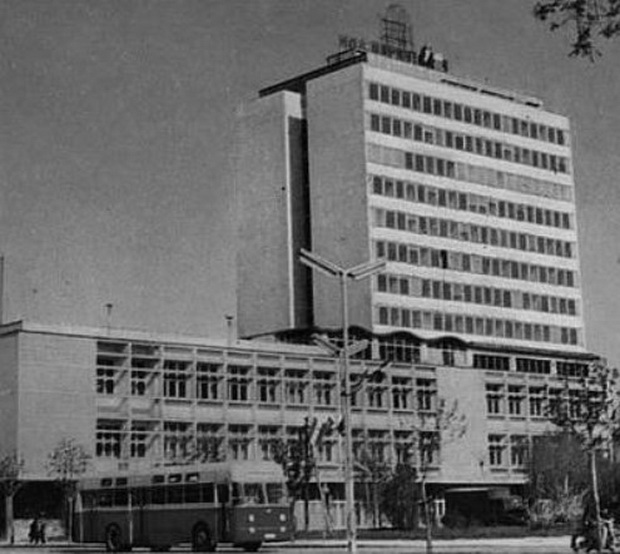
Rabotnički Dom by Slavko Brezoski, Skopje, 1963

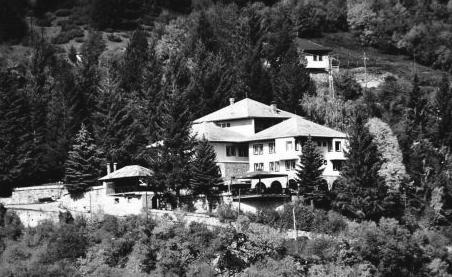
Hotel Neda Slavko Brezoski, Galičnik, 1983

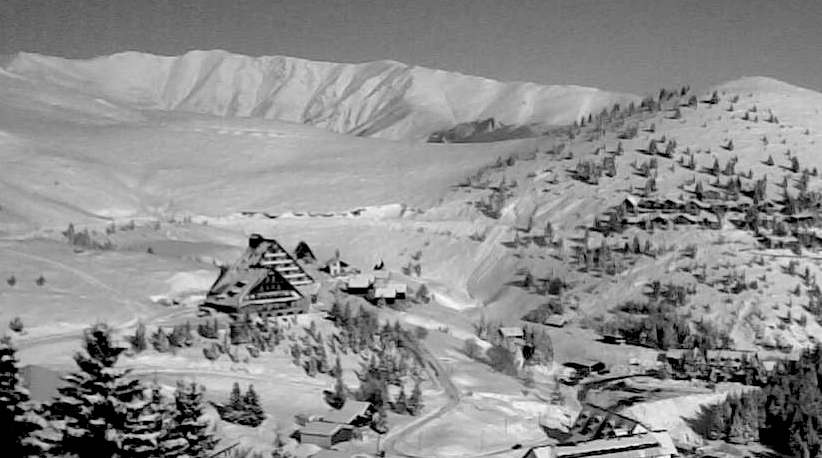
Hotel Slavija by Slavko Brezoski, 1960s

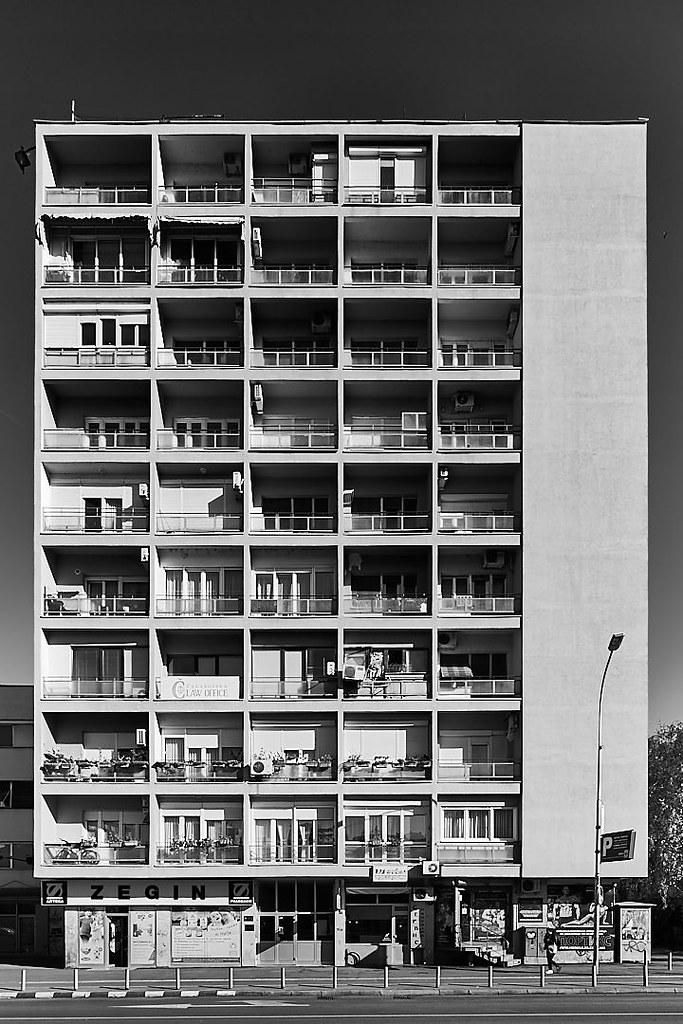
Apartment block 'Papagal' by Slavko Brezoski, 1957

=== Memorials ===
During this period, the Yugoslav break from Soviet socialist realism combined with efforts to commemorate World War II, which together led to the creation of an immense quantity of abstract sculptural war memorials.

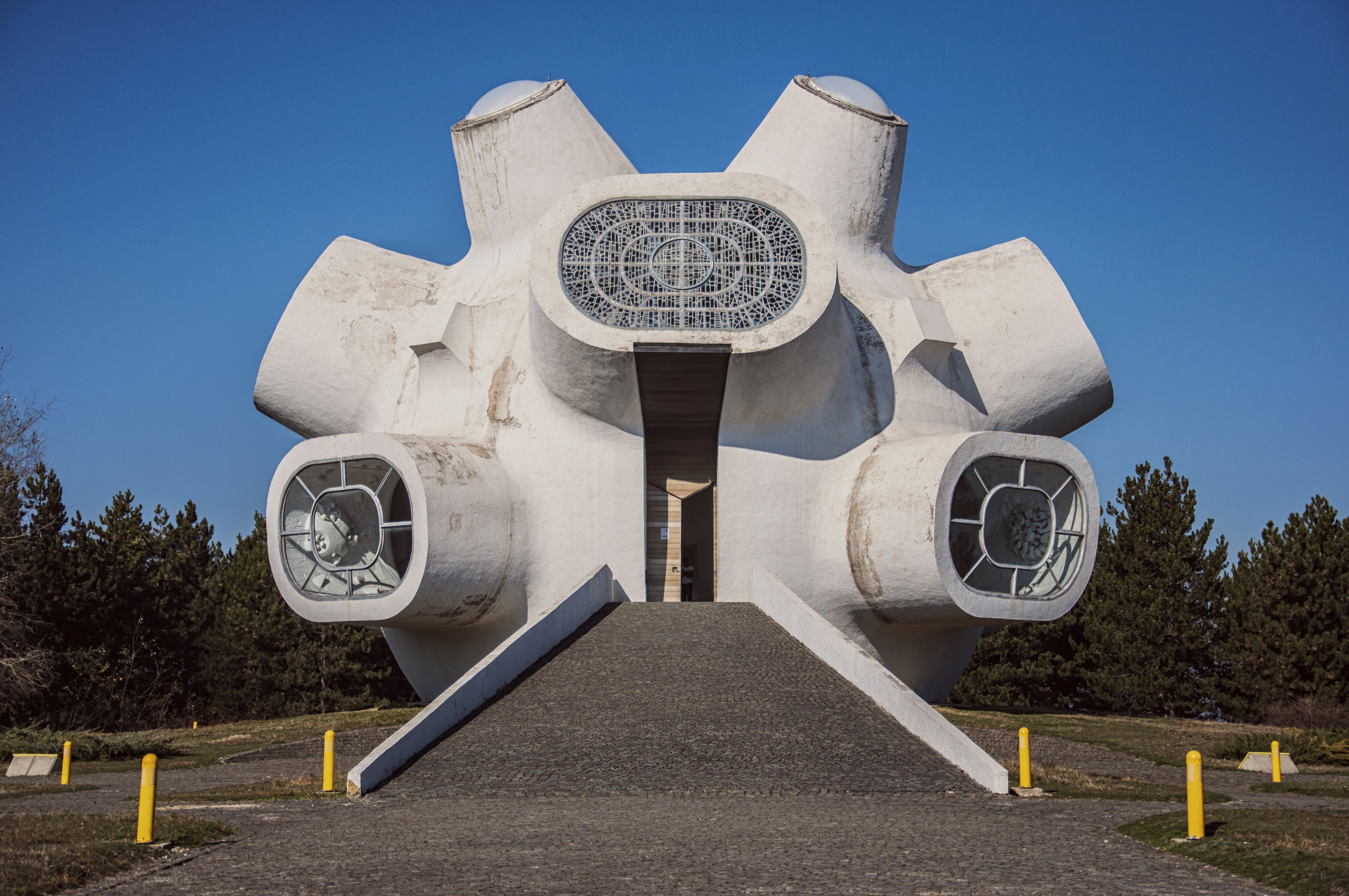
Makedonium spomenik, a monument dedicated to the Ilinden Uprising, Kruševo

=== Brutalism ===
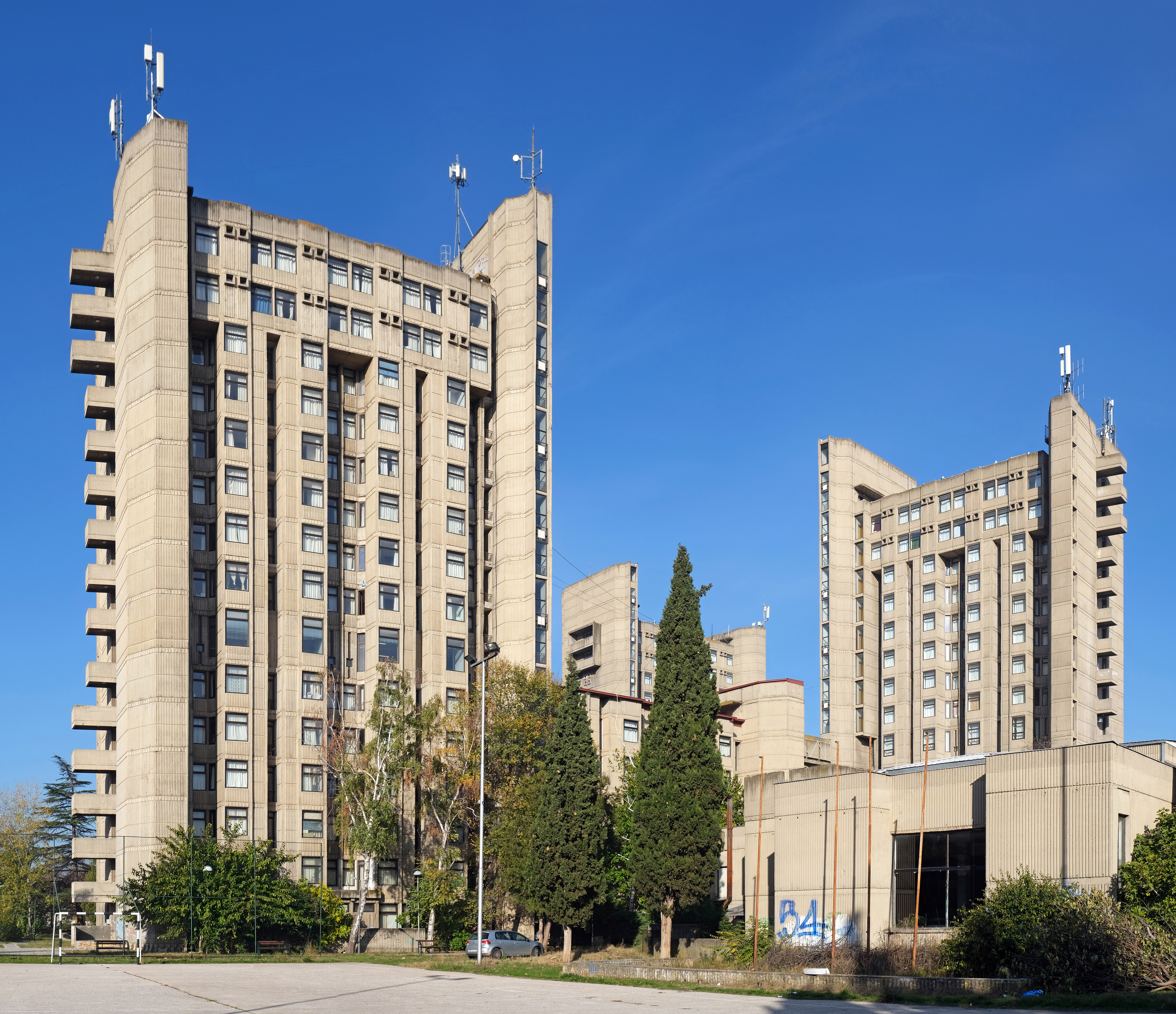
Student dormitory (1971) by Georgi Konstantinovski in Skopje

In the late 1950s and early 1960s Brutalism began to garner a following within Yugoslavia, particularly among younger architects, a trend possibly influenced by the 1959 disbandment of the Congrès Internationaux d'Architecture Moderne.

Brutalism's growing influence in the nation was most prominently exemplified in reconstruction efforts of Skopje following a destructive 1963 earthquake. Japanese architect Kenzo Tange played a key role in pushing for brutalism in the city, going so far as to propose a full redesign of Skopje in the style.

The earthquake destroyed 80% of the city, the reconstruction effort received international attention and the world contributed a century of modern architectural knowledge to the effort of rebuilding. The winning teams included Kenzo Tange (Japan), Johannes van den Broek and Jaap Bakema (Holland), Luigi Piccinato (Italy), Maurice Rotival (USA), Aleksandar Dordevik (Yugoslavia), Eduard Ravnikar (Yugoslavia), Radovan Mischevik and Fedor Wenzler (Yugoslavia), and Slavko Brezoski (Yugoslavia). The result of the earthquake was the development of an urban master plan for the city, internationally inspired with a focus on social and urban modernisation, a catalyst for architectural development of Skopje and Macedonia.

Reconstruction of Skopje was executed as a major international urban master plan and building effort, see Skopje Master Plan.

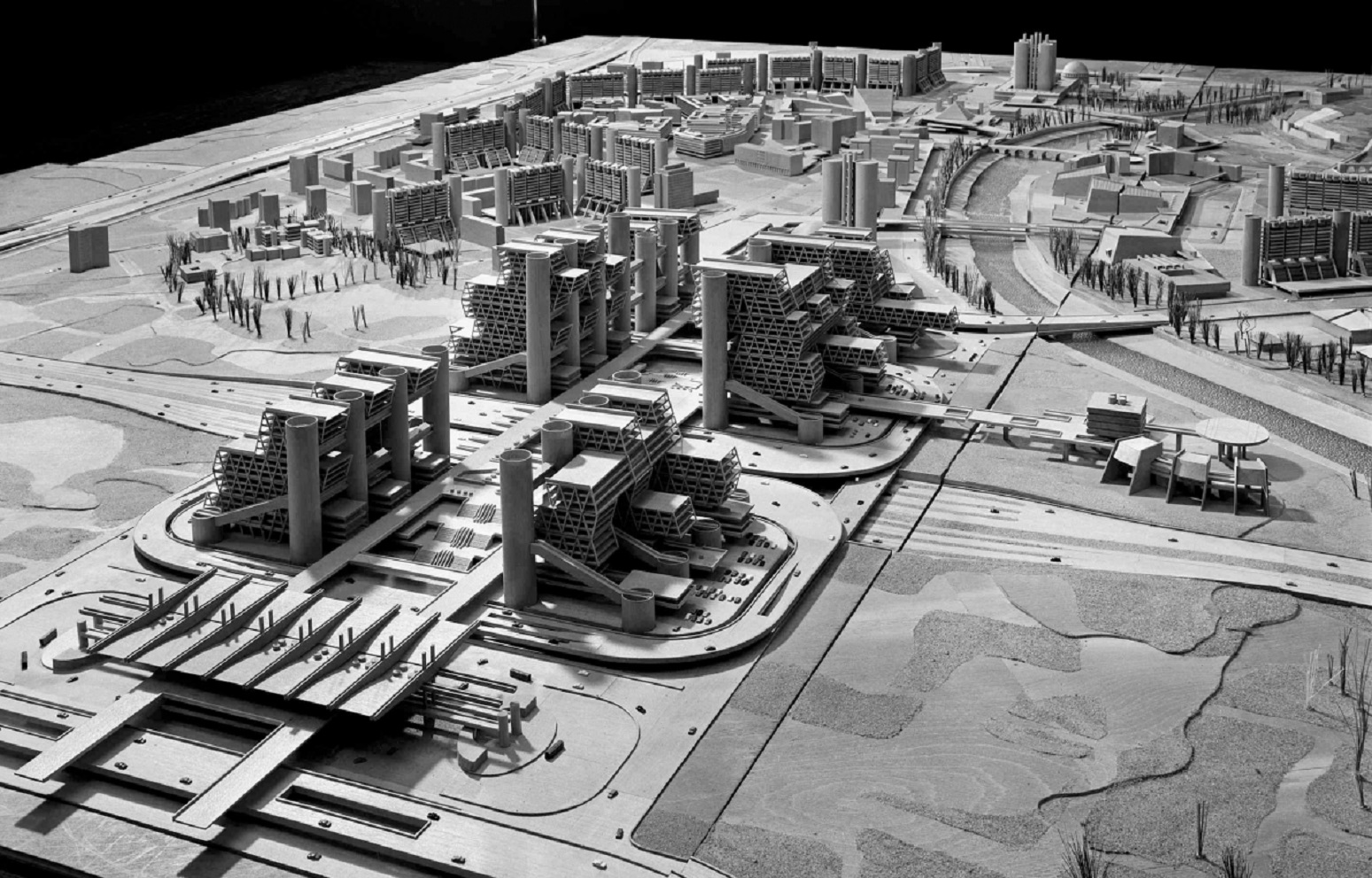
Skopje Masterplan Model Kenzo Tange

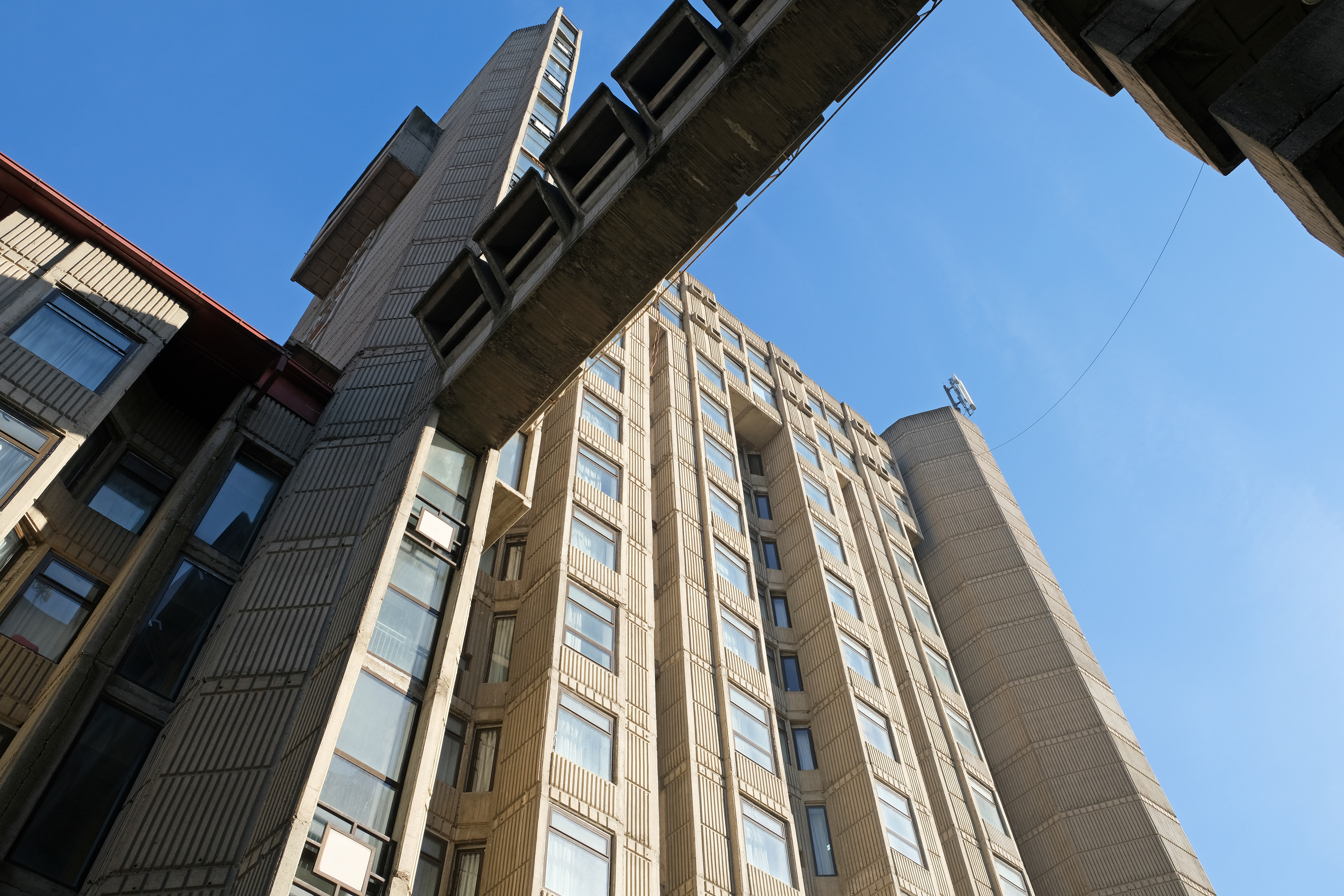
Student dormitory (1971) by Georgi Konstantinovski in Skopje

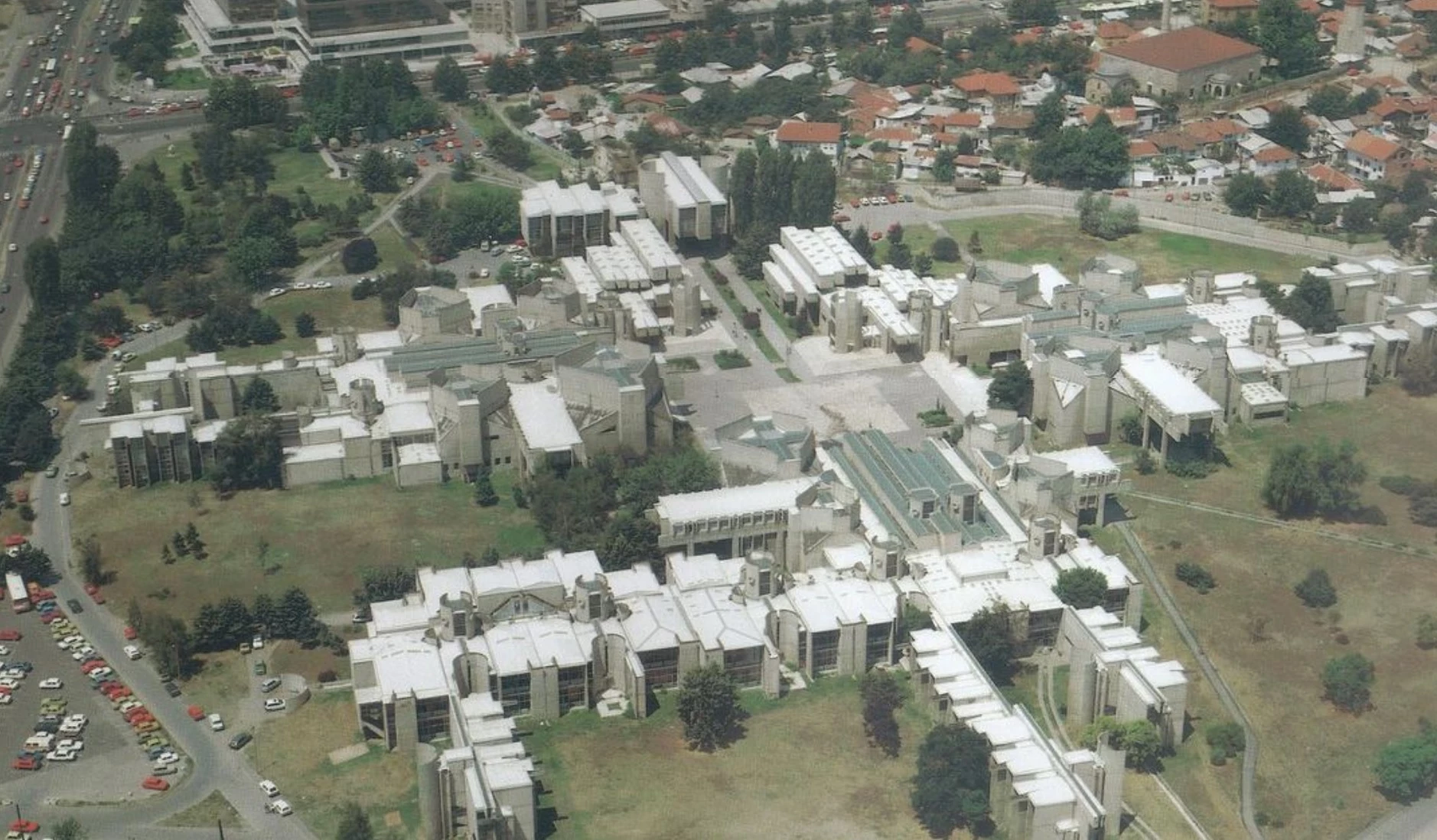
University of Skopje Campus by Marko Mušič, 1974

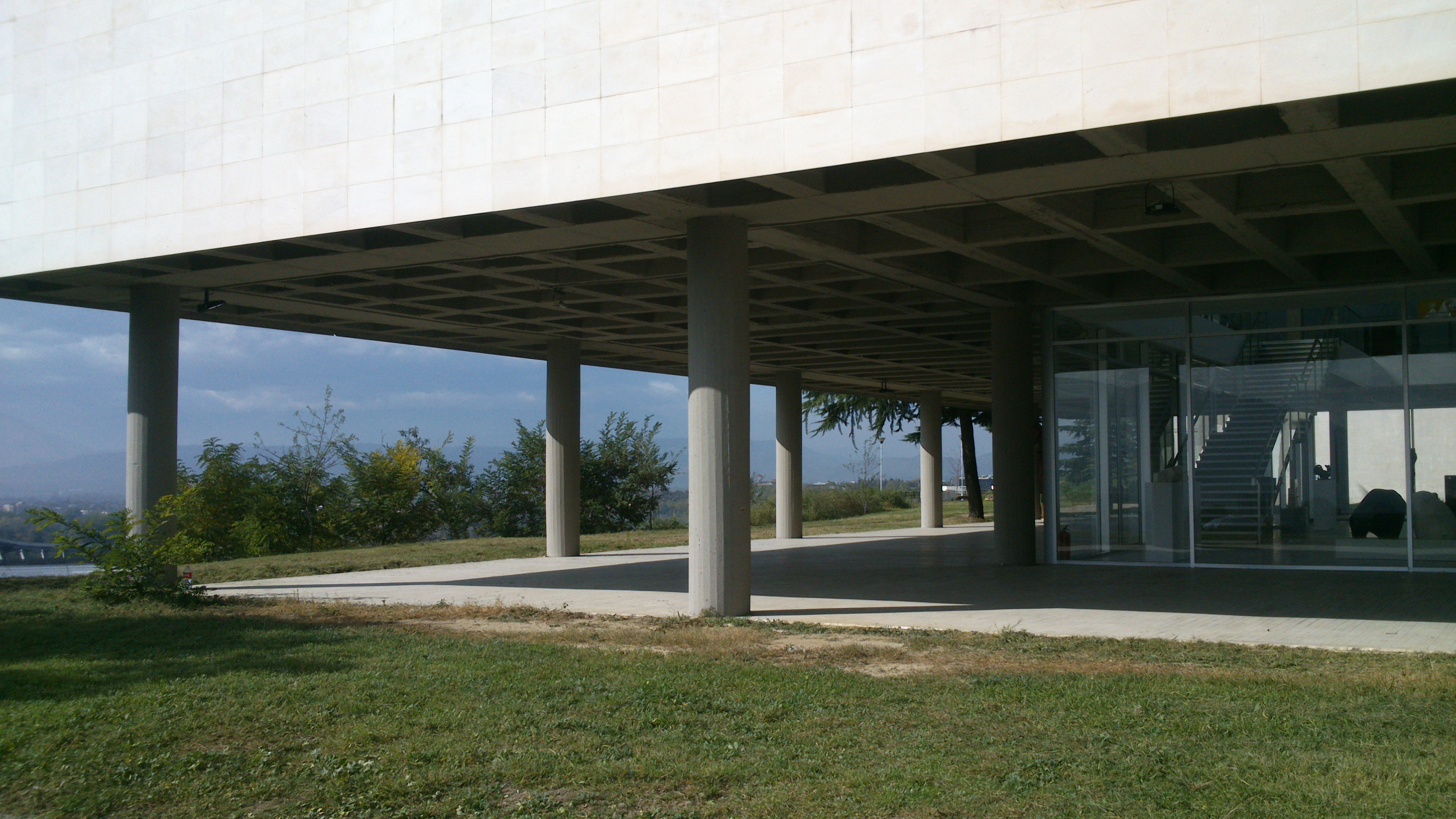
Contemporary Art Museum of Macedonia (1970) in Skopje

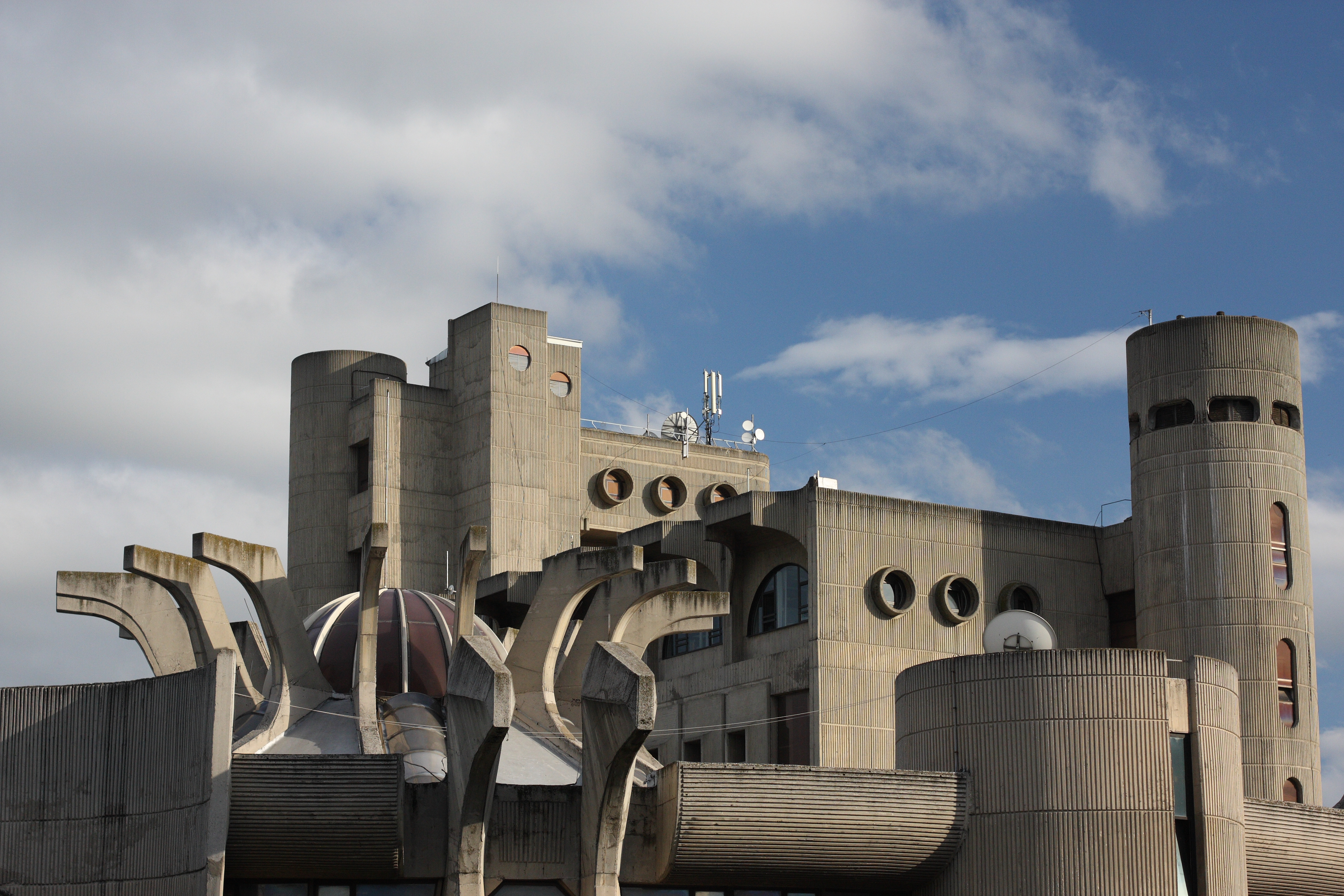
Skopje Central Post Office (1974) by Janko Konstantinov in Skopje

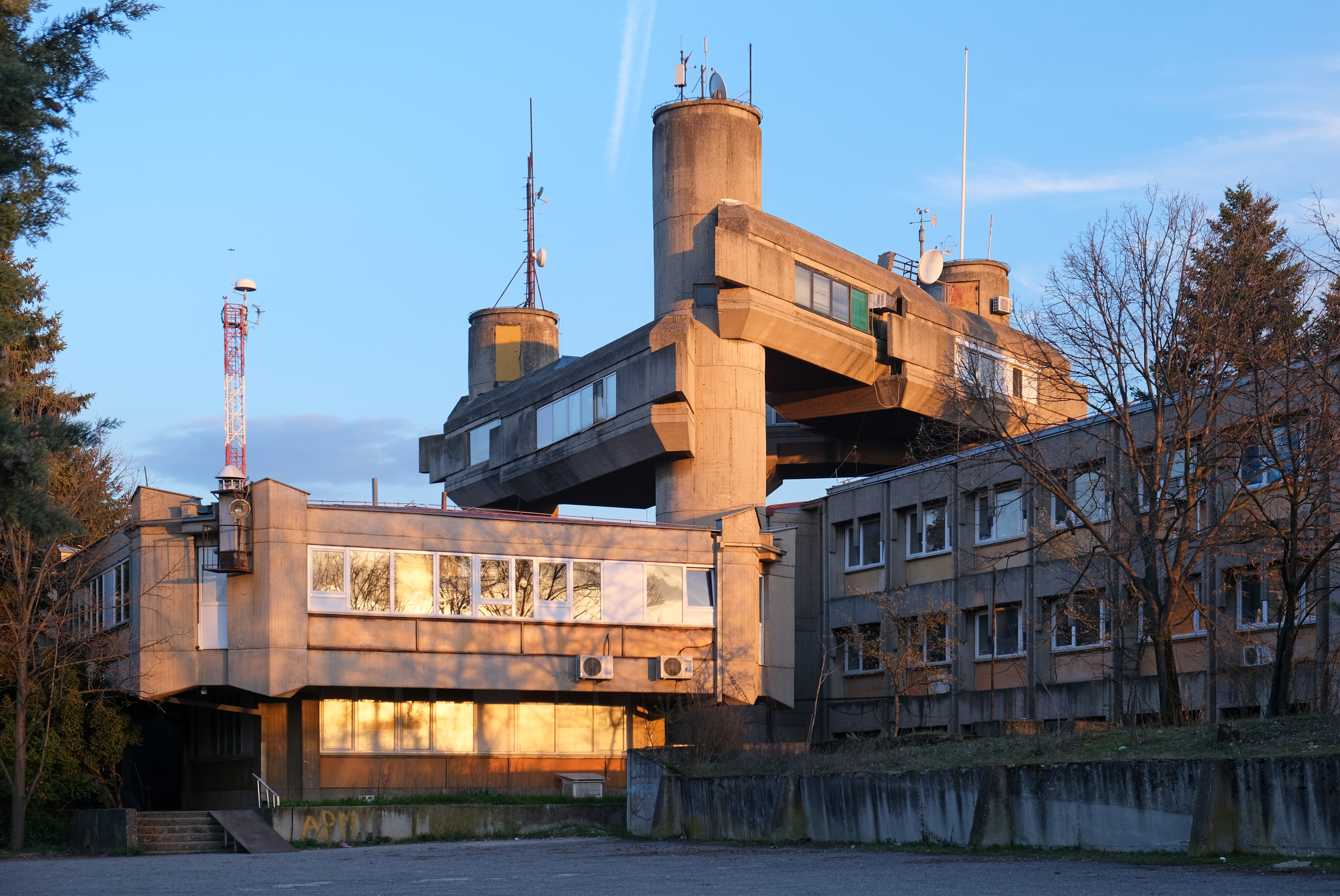
Hydrometeorological Institute (1979) by Krsto Todorovski in Skopje

=== Decentralization ===
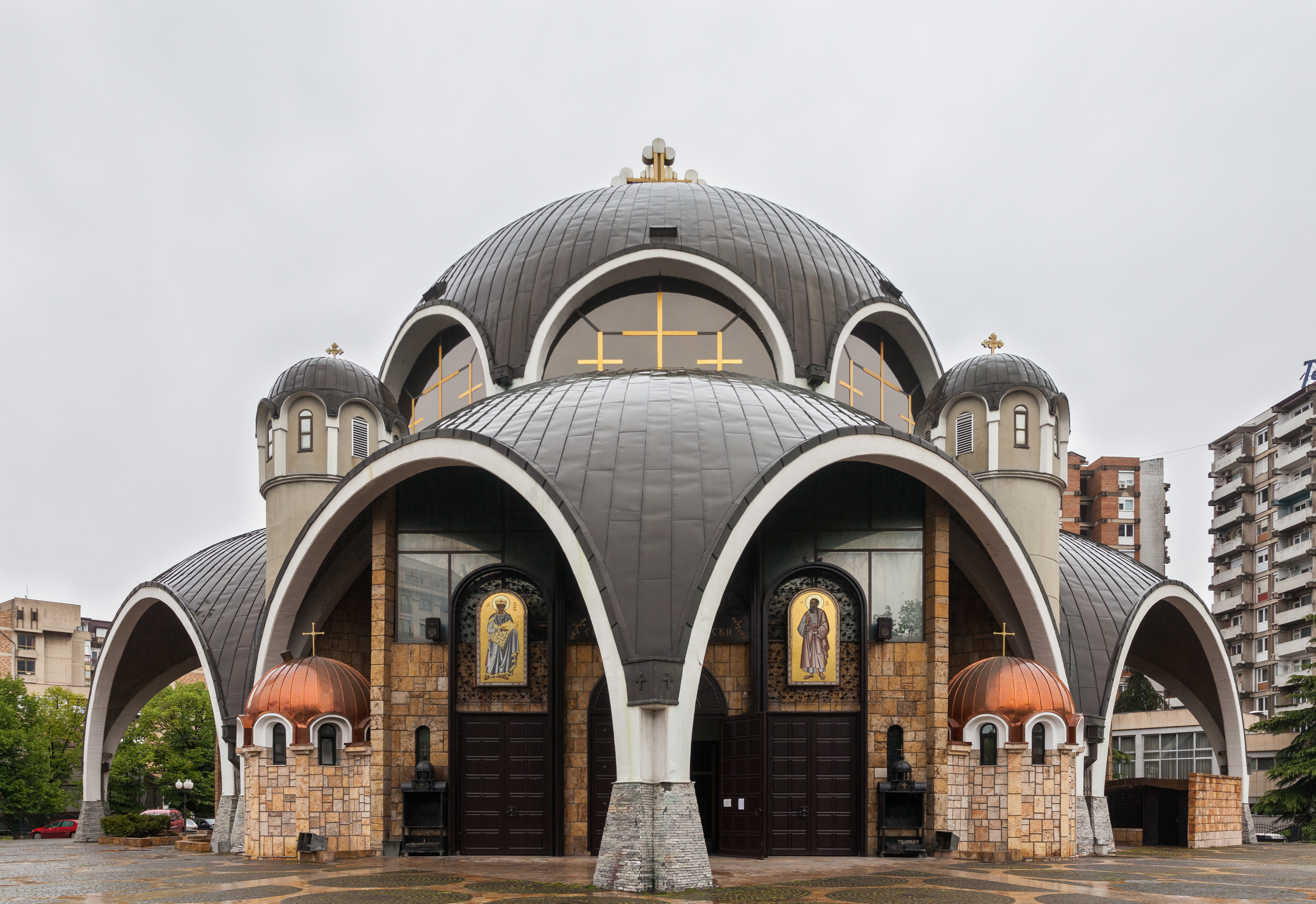
The Church of St. Clement of Ohrid (1972) by Slavko Brezoski in Skopje blurs the lines between Macedonian religious architecture and postmodernism.

With 1950s decentralization and liberalization policies in SFR Yugoslavia, architecture became increasingly fractured along ethnic lines. Architects increasingly focused on building with reference to the architectural heritage of their individual socialist republics in the form of critical regionalism. Growing distinction of individual ethnic architectural identities within Yugoslavia was exacerbated with the 1972 decentralization of the formerly centralized historical preservation authority, providing individual regions further opportunity to critically analyze their own cultural narratives.

== Contemporary architecture ==
Most of the modern buildings in North Macedonia are located in central Skopje. One example is the MRT Center (the national TV broadcast station), rising to 230 ft (70.10 m) (70 m) which was the tallest building in the country until 2013 when the Cevahir Towers were built.

Examples of modern architecture are also found in other cities, mainly Bitola and Gostivar.

=== Skopje 2014 ===
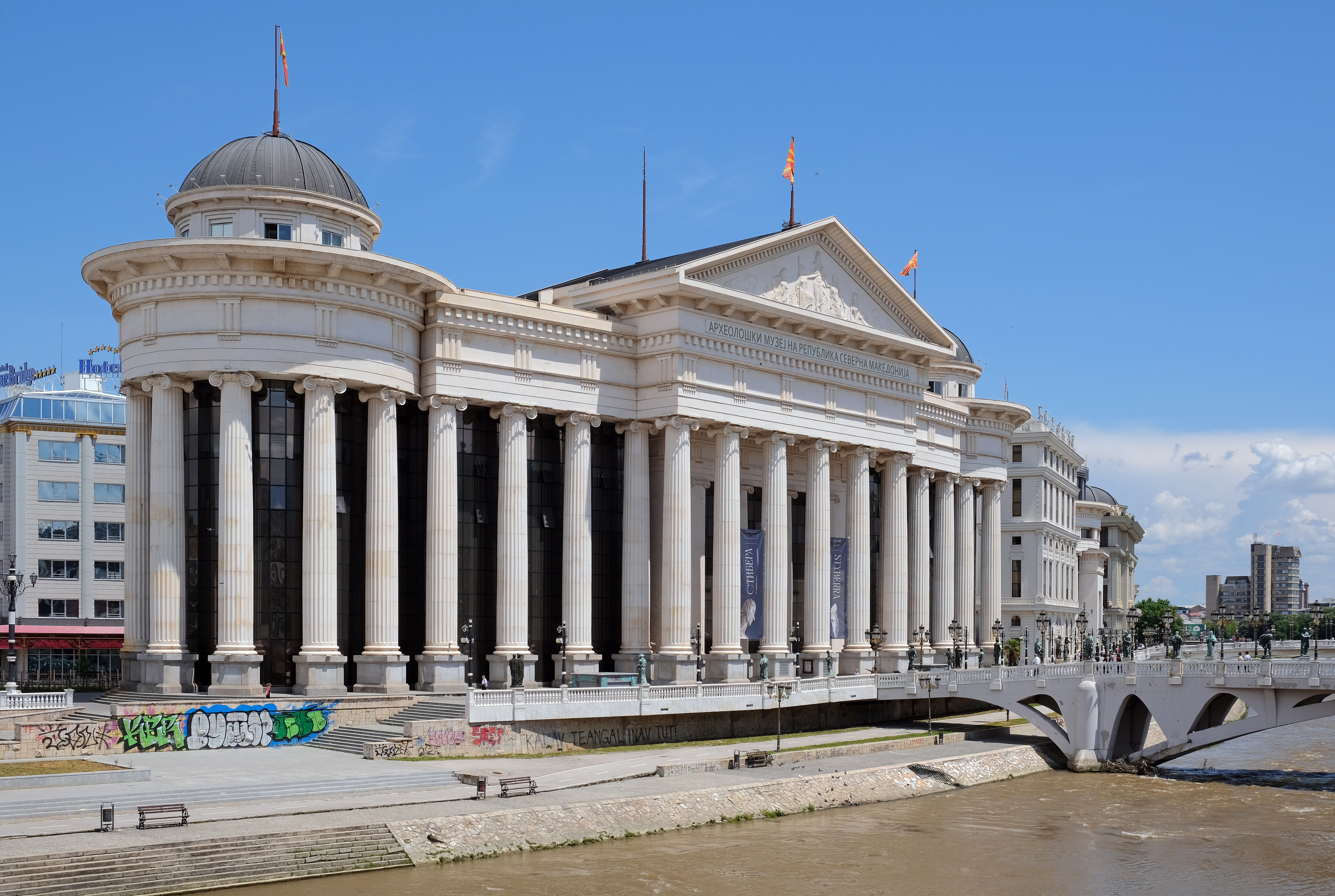
Renovated Museum of Archeology

Skopje 2014 was a project with the purpose of giving the capital Skopje a neo-classical appeal, by constructing several buildings, mostly in the neoclassical style and altering facades of modernist buildings to look neo-classical, which has drawn criticism from architects as being kitsch. The impact of the project continues to be controversial, due to the severe impact it has on damaging standards and guidelines drawn to develop the city by an international generation of architects as an architectural and social ecosystem.
