= Memorial House of Mother Teresa =

Museum in Skopje, North Macedonia

Mother Teresa Memorial House
- Спомен-куќа на Мајка Тереза
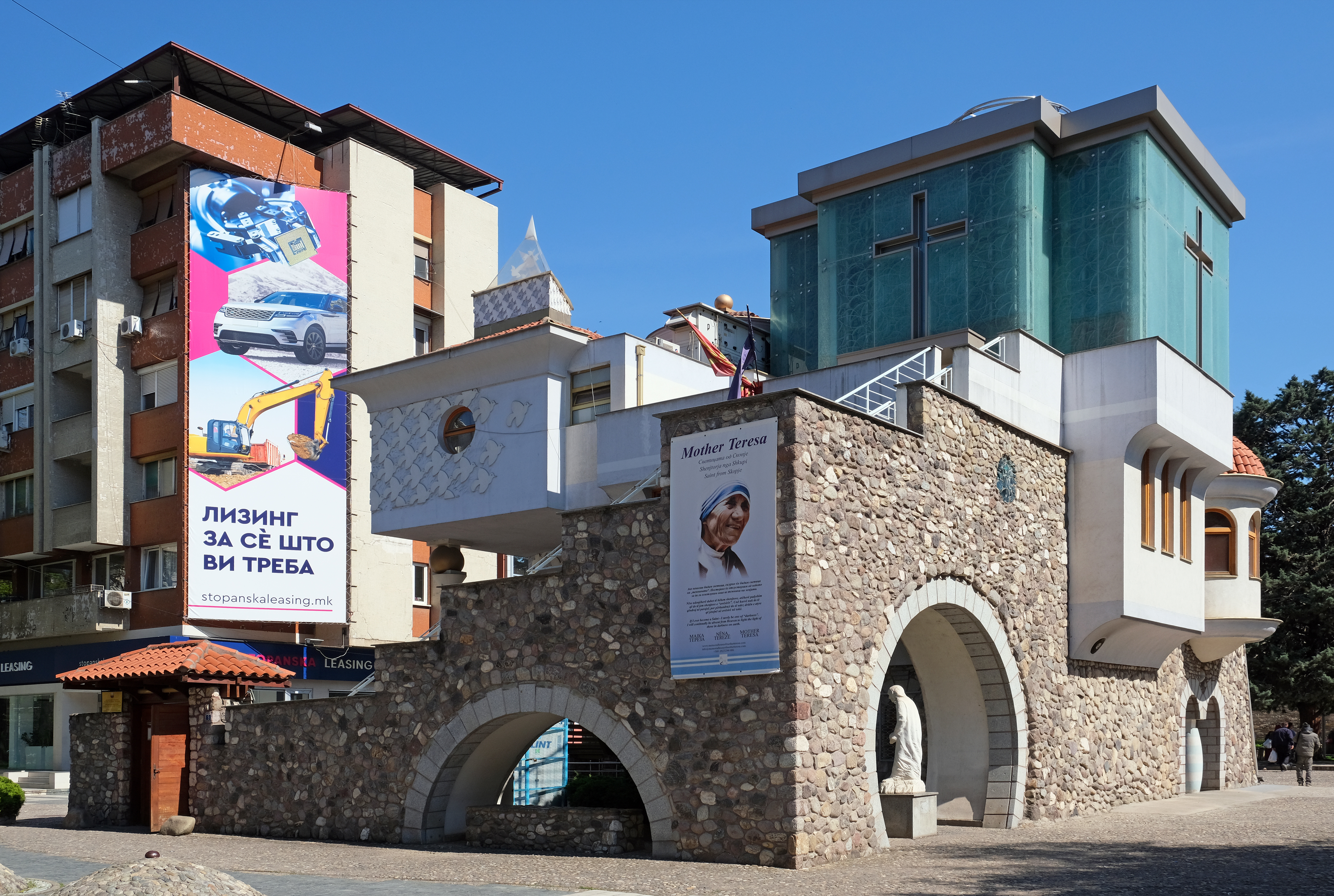
- The Memorial House of Mother Teresa

- Location in North Macedonia
- Established: 30 January 2009
- Location: Skopje, North Macedonia
- Coordinates: 41°59′38″N 21°25′51″E
- Type: Memorial, museum
- Visitors: Around 12,000 (first three weeks)
- Founder: Government of North Macedonia
- Architect: Vangel Božinovski
- Public transit access: Macedonia Square
- Website: memorialhouseofmotherteresa.com.mk

The Mother Teresa Memorial House (Macedonian: Спомен-куќа на Мајка Тереза, romanized: Spomen-kukja na Majka Tereza, Albanian: Shtëpia përkujtimore e Nënë Terezës) is a museum dedicated to the Catholic saint and Nobel Peace Prize laureate Mother Teresa. It is located in her hometown Skopje, in North Macedonia, where she lived from 1910 to 1928. The memorial house was built on the Macedonia Street in the Centar municipality, on the location of the former Sacred Heart of Jesus Roman Catholic Church, where Mother Teresa was baptized. It lies just east of the Ristiḱ Palace and the Macedonia Square. Opened in January 2009, the memorial house was visited by around 12,000 people in its first three weeks.

== History ==
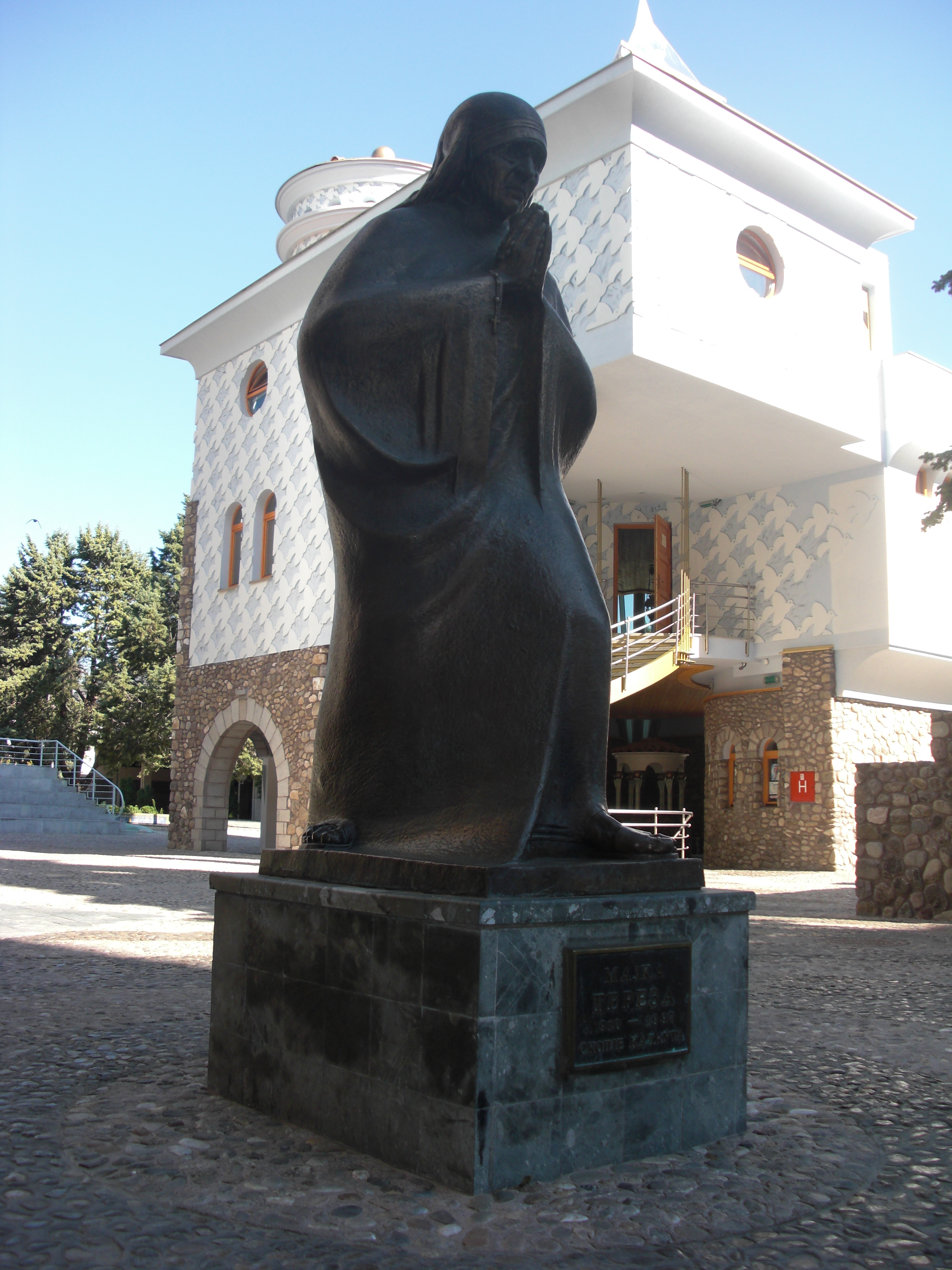
Monument of Mother Teresa next to the memorial house

On her 100th birthday anniversary, the Memorial House of Mother Teresa was incorporated into the Skopje 2014 project. Construction of the building began in May 2008. It was built on the location of the former Sacred Heart Catholic Church (the place where Mother Teresa was baptized), which was destroyed in the 1963 Skopje earthquake. The government funded the project with €2,000,000. In an international competition for the project, the Macedonian Ministry of Culture declared a Portuguese architect as the winner. However, the government overturned this decision, choosing a design previously produced by a local architect team. The architect of the project was Vangel Božinovski. The memorial house was opened on 30 January 2009. Catholic bishop Kiro Stojanov consecrated the memorial house.

Within the first three weeks after its opening, the museum was visited by around 12,000 people. Inside the museum, part of her relics are preserved, which were transferred to Skopje, with the help of the Catholic Church. In 2013, the Memorial House of Mother Teresa was promoted to a cultural heritage object.

== Reception ==
Architect Maren Harnack said that the building "does not symbolize Mother Teresa's life and her renunciation of material goods", while architect Erich Raith described the structure as "designed very perfunctorily, with too many stories to tell, but without any essential message to give". Raith said that "if it weren’t for the Christian cross, it could be a disco or casino".

Architecture professor Divna Pencić has called the building "a tactless and tasteless homage to Mother Teresa" and "a depressing example of political meddling":

It is like someone tastelessly dressed, arrayed in gumboots, lace stockings, a brocade skirt and a Chinese silk shirt, all heavily accented with bling and what appears to be a cosmonaut's helmet. … If it weren't designed to commemorate such an important figure, this building might have gotten away with its inoffensive zaniness. But, as it turns out, it is hugely offensive. It offends with its skewed selection procedure, with its pretentiousness, with its arrogance, with its tastelessness. But, most of all, it offends by totally ignoring any architectural correlation with the life and work of Mother Teresa. Will Skopje get another chance? After this, it does not deserve one.

An architect involved in the making of the museum said:

I admit that some critiques about Skopje 2014 are reasonable. But the critiques about the Mother Teresa House are totally ungrounded and not professionally presented. The Memorial House is built according to the principle of a cenotaph, that is, a monument which calls for the soul of the deceased to return home. The Pope approved for one bone from Mother Teresa’s finger to be brought in from the Vatican to the House. This made it a sanctuary.

According to the museum, "the most positive reviews of the eclectic style come from foreign architects, tourists, and younger visitors". In 2020, architect Miroslav Grčev called for the demolishment of the museum, along with Porta Macedonia.
