= Ancient Theatre of Ohrid =

Archaeological site in North Macedonia

Coordinates: 41.114711°N 20.793894°E

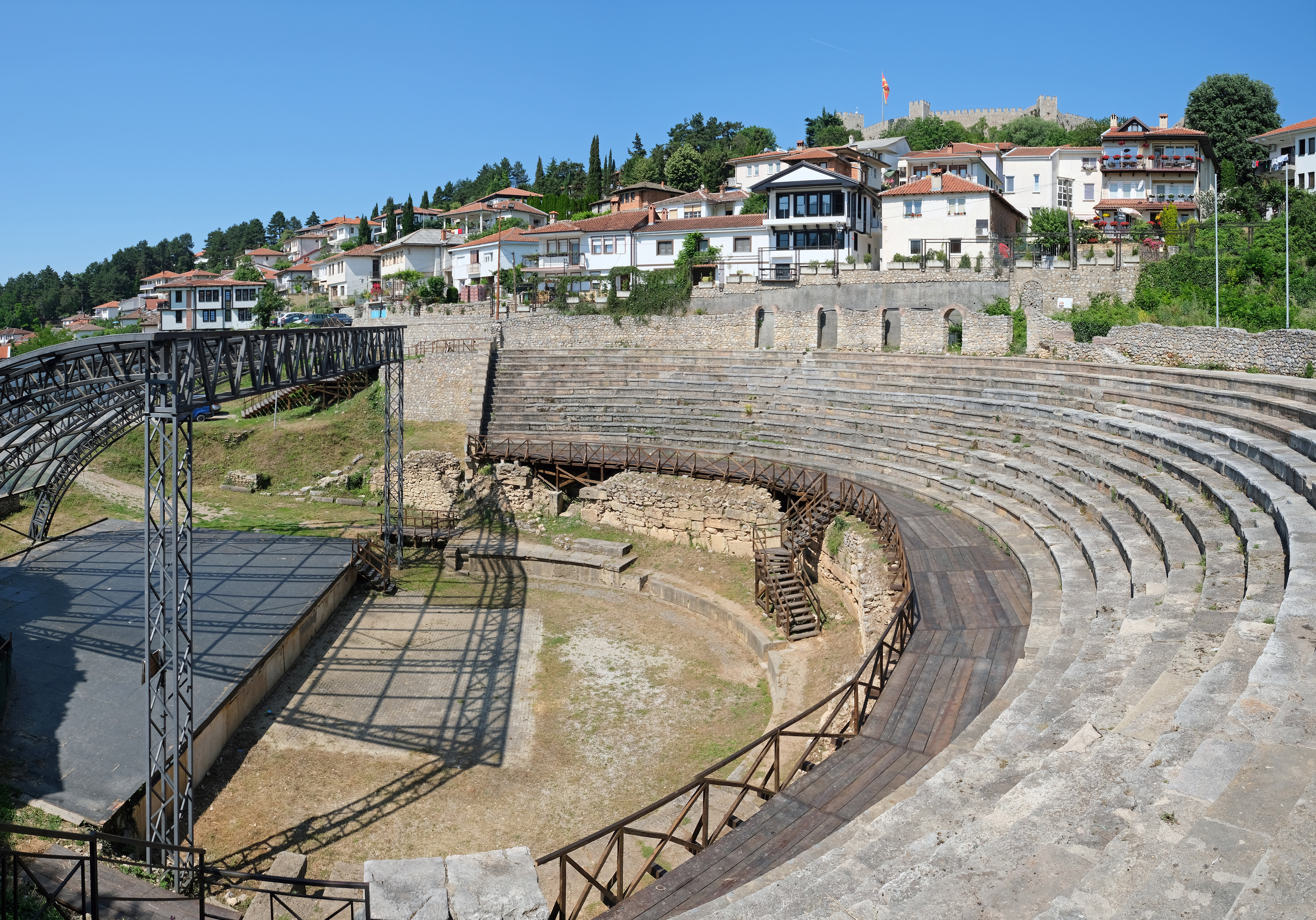
The Ancient Theatre

The Ancient theatre of Ohrid is located in Ohrid, North Macedonia. It was built in 200 BC and is the only Hellenistic-type theatre in the country as the other three in Scupi, Stobi and Heraklea Lynkestis are from Roman times. It is unclear how many people the original theater used to seat, as only the lower section still exists. The open theater has a perfect location: the two hills that surround it keep it protected from winds that could interfere with acoustics during performances. It was built at the end of 3rd or the beginning of 2nd century BC, during the late Hellenistic period.

During Roman times, the theater was also used for gladiator fights. However, since the theater was also a site of executions of Christians by the Romans, it rapidly turned to a highly disliked site by the locals. In fact, as a result of this dislike, the theater was abandoned and buried by the locals after the demise of the Roman Empire. This allowed for most of the structure to be well preserved, only to be uncovered accidentally in the 1980s. Namely, during construction work around some of the houses in the area, large stone blocks with carvings of the Greek god Dionysus and the muses, deities related to the performance arts, were showing up, which led archaeologists to believe that a Greek theater must have been located nearby.

Since the late 1980s, the theater is again a site of public performances, such as plays, concerts, operas, ballet performances. Recently, high-profile cultural performances such as those by the Bolshoi and José Carreras take place each summer as part of the Ohrid Summer Festival.

== See also ==
- List of ancient Greek theatres
