= Ristić Palace =

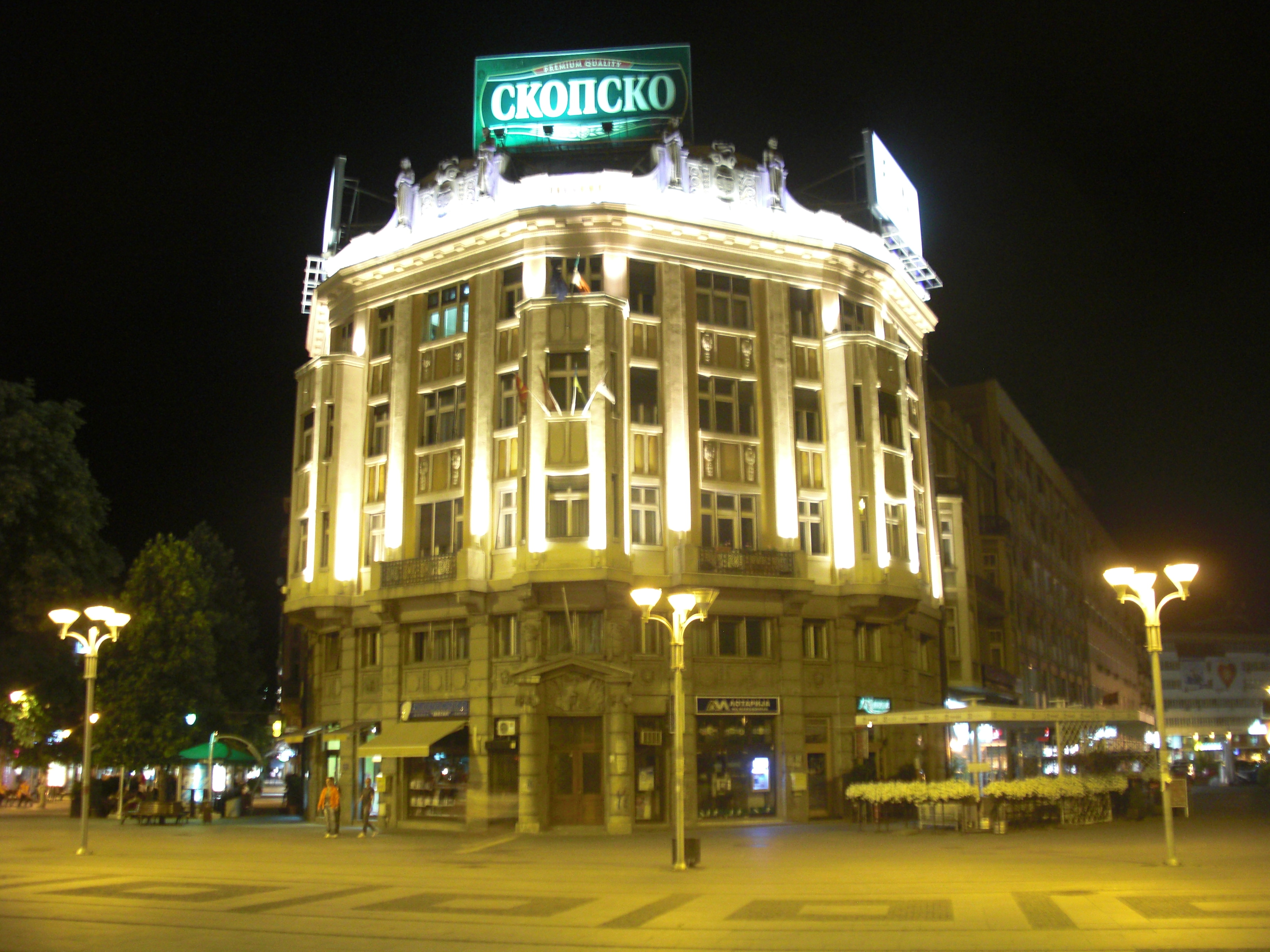
- Ristić Palace illuminated at night

- Location within North Macedonia

General information
- Location: Skopje, North Macedonia
- Coordinates: 41°59′44″N 21°25′51″E
- Completed: 1926
- Client: Vladislav Ristić

Design and construction
- Architect: Dragutin Maslać
- Engineer: Danilo Stanković

Ristić Palace (Serbian Cyrillic: Ристићева палата; Macedonian: Ристиќева палата, Ristikjeva palata, Albanian: Pallati Ristiq) is a monumental symbolic building at Macedonia Square in Skopje, North Macedonia. The palace is located on the southern side of the Vardar river, in the southern part of Macedonia Square to the east is the birthplace of Mother Teresa, and to the south is the Memorial House of Mother Teresa and the headquarters of the Ministry of Transport and Communications of North Macedonia. It was built in 1926 and is currently used as an office block.

== History ==
Built in 1926 in then Kingdom of Yugoslavia by Serbian Vladislav Ristić (Serbian Cyrillic: Владислав Ристић), a pharmacist, the building served as offices on the ground floor with the Ristiḱ family living in the other floors. However, now it is a complex of business offices.

The palace is one of the few large buildings in Skopje from that period that survived the shocks of the 1963 Skopje earthquake which occurred in then part of SFR Yugoslavia, now North Macedonia. The architectural design of the building is credited to Dragutin Maslać and construction credit is to Danilo Stanković, who provided the sculptural aspects of the building.

Threatened with destruction at one time, due to it being an alleged illegal construction area of some 50 square meters, a law was passed by the government of Skopje preserving the palace as a Cultural Heritage landmark.

== Description ==
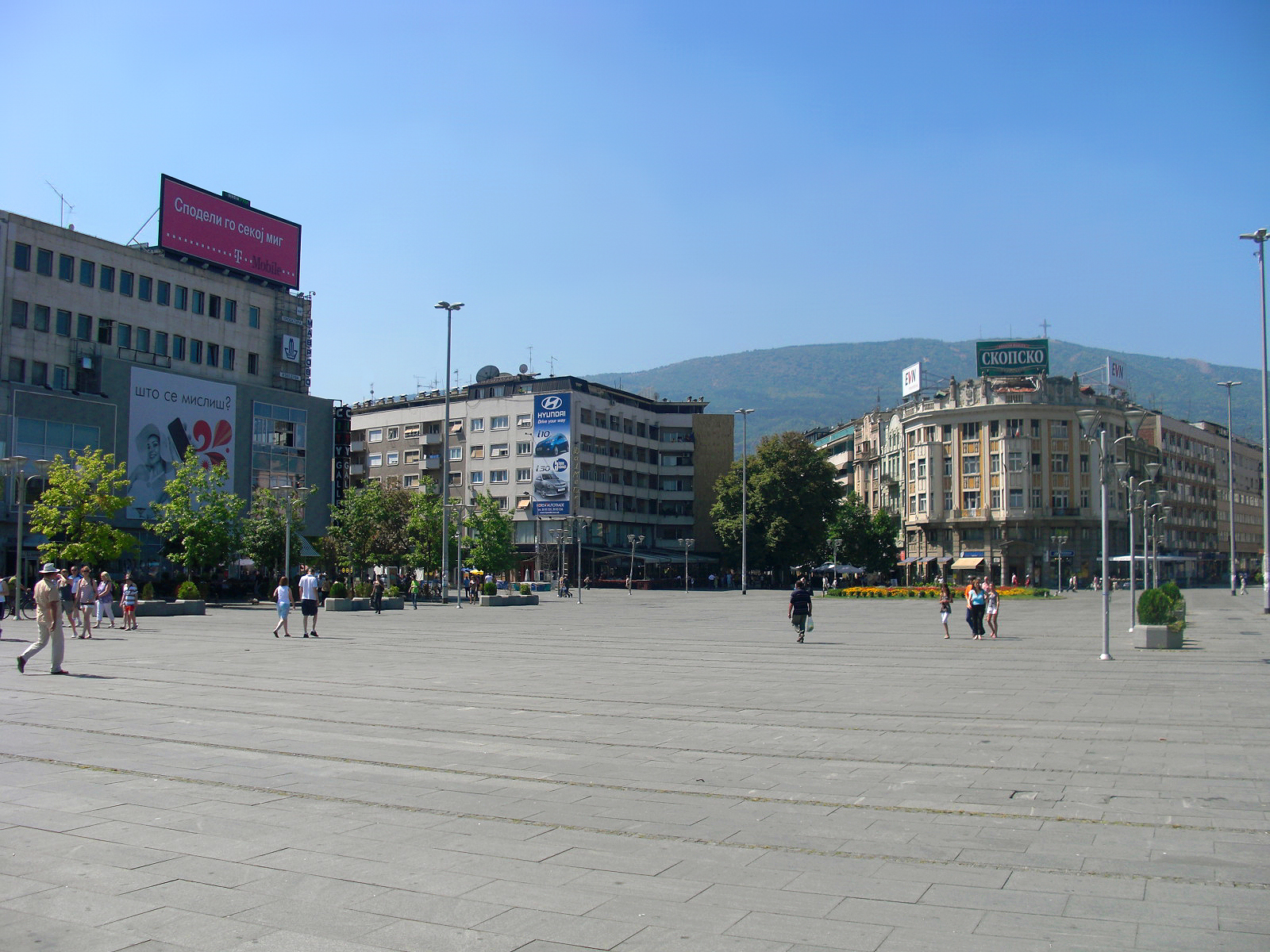
View from across Macedonia Square

The palace was named after its owner, Vladislav Ristić. Designed by Dragutin Maslać, it is typical of the buildings that were built by wealthy businessmen of Skopje. The ground floor formerly housed the business centers, the basement was used as stores and the upper floors were used for residential purpose by the owner and his family. Even at the time it was built, the building had many modern facilities such as refrigerator that functioned on ice, telephones, and attached toilets and bathrooms with each room.

Ristić Palace is a cream and beige painted building, aside from the basement it includes the ground floor, a first floor, then a midsection consisting of three floors, and then the attic and roof part of the building which contains the banner on top. The ground floor today contains shops and flowers are sold to the right of the building. Two of the rooms on the second floor (the lowest of the three floor midsection) contain small balconies overlooking the square. The railings are low, but elegantly designed. Above the two balconies, between the second and third floors and again above that, between the third and fourth floors, are symmetrical sculptural designs painted white/cream, consisting of two, side by side, above each window, so eight in total, facing the square.

When the building was built, the designers and architects were aware of the seismic conditions of the area, based on past experience of earthquake incidence and its damaging effects on buildings particularly in metropolitan cities like Skopje. They had thus taken due care to account for the seismic parameters based on the magnitude of earthquakes as design factors in the design of the building. This is one reason due to which the palace survived the effects of the 1963 Skopje earthquake; earthquake was of magnitude of 6.1 that occurred on July 26, 1963, causing death of 1070 apart from injuries to many people. Ristiḱ Palace was one of the few buildings that survived when nearly 70% of the buildings in the town were destroyed. Most of the buildings were built in Skopje with vertical load bearing walls and this is one reason attributed for the collapse. Other reasons mentioned for the collapse being use of the materials used in construction. In the case of the palace, modern building standards were followed. Ikonomov House was built in 1922 by architect Boris Dutov, Todorov House built in 1927 by the architect Novakovic. in the same area which became the elite area of Skopje.

== Gallery ==
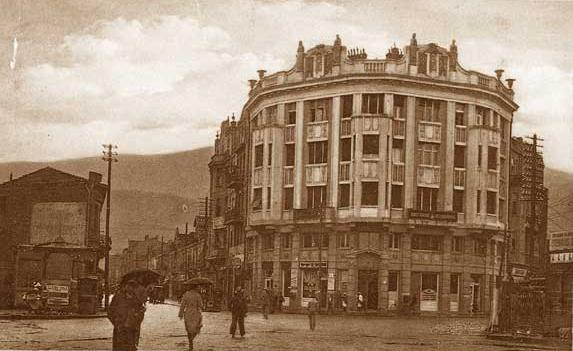
Ristić Palace in 1926 when built

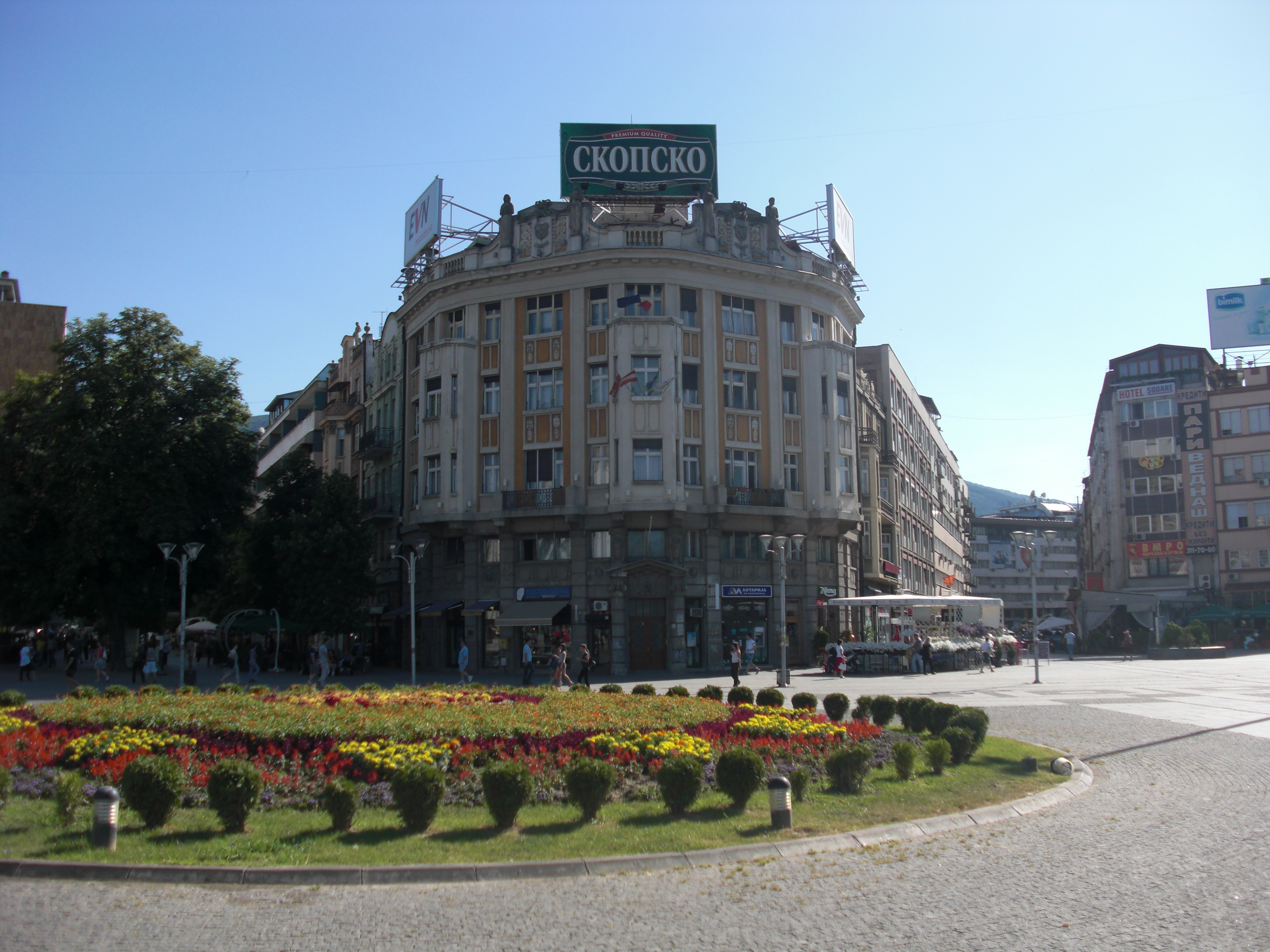
Ristić Palace now

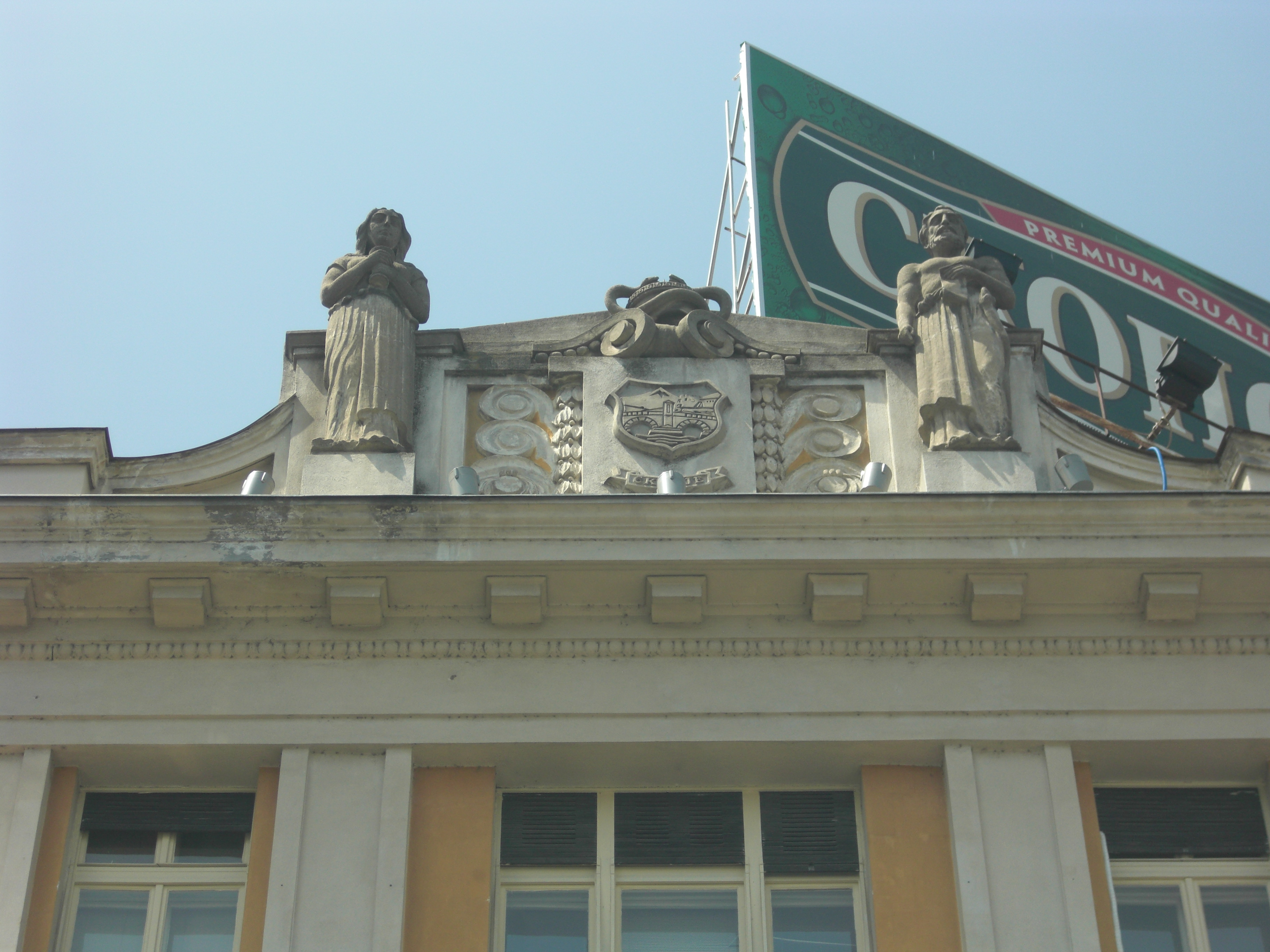
Details from the building's sculptures

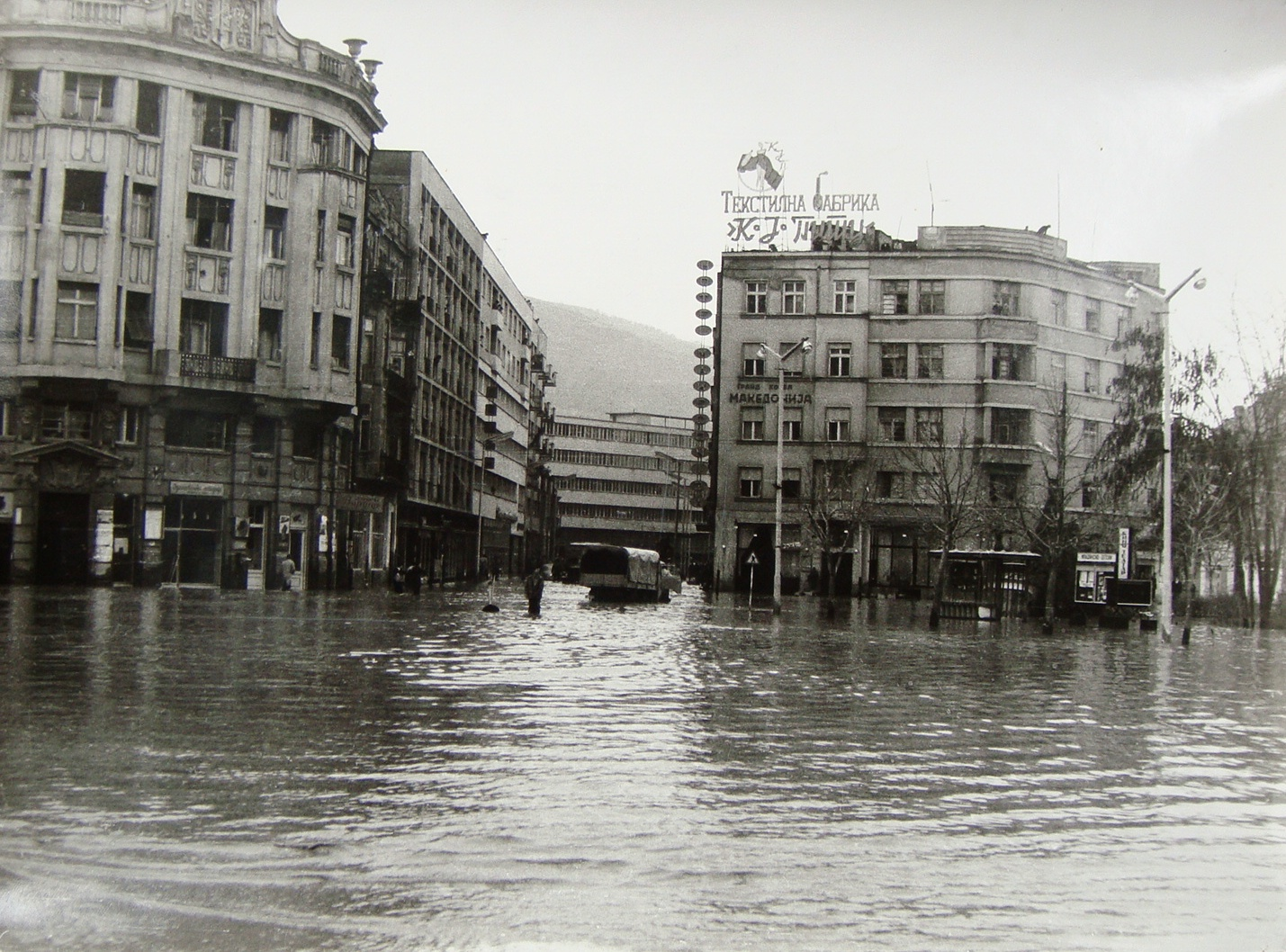
Flooding in 1962 in Skopje, locality: hotel Macedonia and Palace Ristić
