= History of the Jews in Monastir =

The history of the Jews in Monastir (present-day Bitola, North Macedonia) and its region reaches back two thousand years. The Monastir Province was an Ottoman vilayet, created in 1864, encompassing territories in present-day Albania, North Macedonia (one of the successor states of the former Yugoslavia, from which it declared independence in 1991) and Greece.

On March 11, 1943, the Sephardic Jewish community of Monastir, historically the largest Jewish community in Macedonia was deported. The Jews who trace their ancestry to the Macedonian city known since 1913 as Bitola continue to call the city by the name it bore during centuries of Ottoman rule: Monastir.

Between 1941 and 1944, Bulgaria, in alliance with Nazi Germany, occupied the Yugoslav province of Macedonia. On March 11, 1943, in cooperation with the Germans, Bulgarian military and police officials rounded up 3,276 of Monastir's Jewish men, women, and children, deported them to German-controlled territory and turned them over to the custody of German officials. The Germans transported the Jewish population of Monastir and environs to their deaths in Treblinka as part of their plan to murder all European Jews.

== Monastir Jews before World War II ==
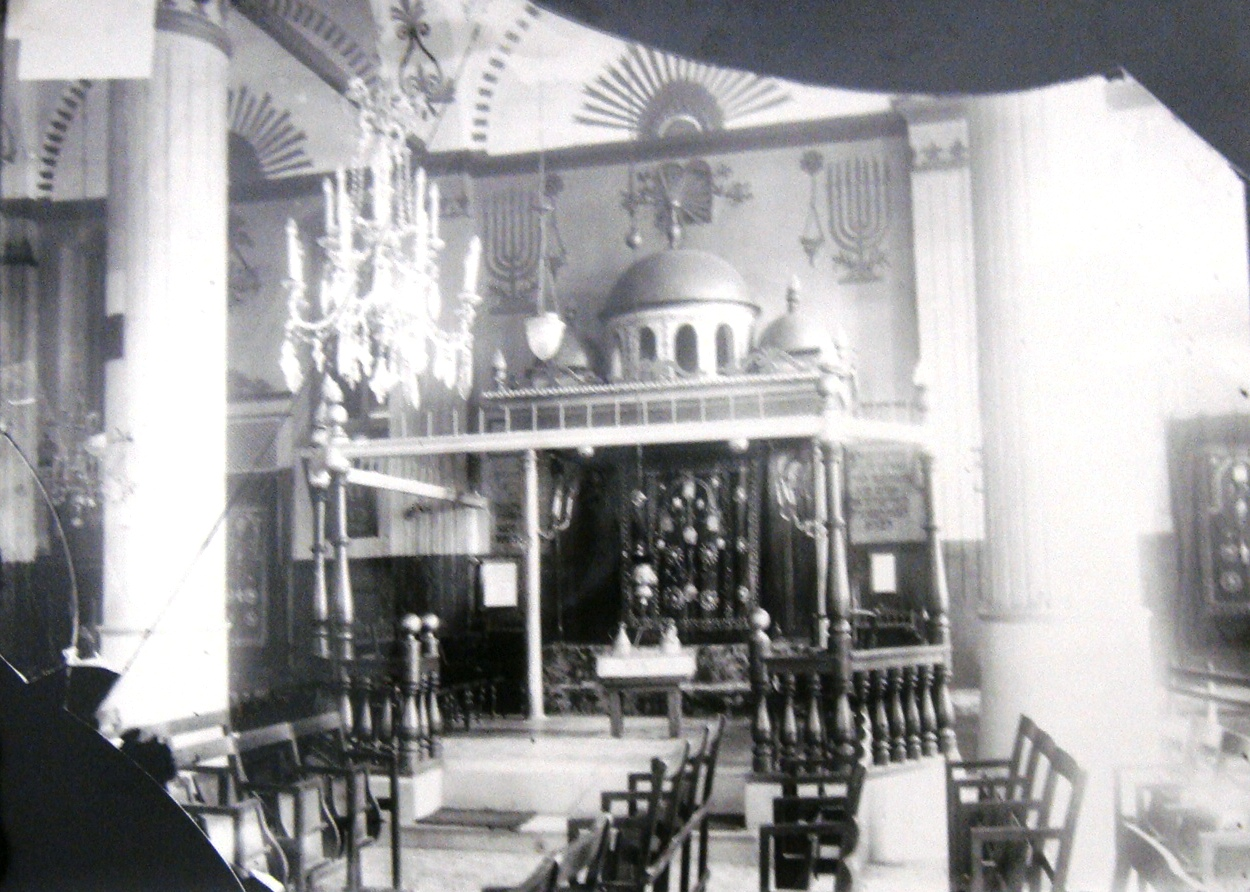
Interior of the Kal di Aragon (Synagogue of Aragon) in Monastir, photographed between the two world wars (1918-1941)

Although Jews had lived in Monastir from Roman times, the Sephardic Jews, who originally migrated from the Iberian Peninsula in the fifteenth century, became the predominant group in the town by the sixteenth century. They maintained a highly traditional and distinctive lifestyle characterized by residence in a Jewish quarter, attachment to the Judeo-Spanish (Ladino) language and Sephardic folklore, commitment to Jewish religious observance, and allegiance to Jewish communal institutions including synagogues, religious schools, religious courts, and mutual aid societies.

In 1863, after a fire destroyed much of the Jewish quarter, the community turned to the Jewish world's leading philanthropist, England's Sir Moses Montefiore, for assistance in reconstruction. This appeal to the West marked the beginning of the Sephardic community's reorientation toward European culture and the gradual introduction of secular education and values into the population. These changes took place at the same time as new transportation links to Salonika expanded trade and brought economic prosperity to the Monastir Jewish community.

This period of cultural and economic development was cut short by political upheavals in the region, beginning in 1903 with the Macedonian rebellion against the Turkish rulers of the Ottoman Empire. Ethnic violence among Greeks, Serbs, and Bulgarians over the future of Macedonia exposed Monastir to political violence and economic disruption throughout the first decade of the twentieth century. As a result, thousands of Jewish Monastirlis (as the locals referred to themselves) emigrated to North and South America, Jerusalem, and the Sephardic metropolis of Salonika. After the end of the Second Balkan War in 1913, formerly Ottoman Macedonia was carved up among Serbia, Bulgaria, and Greece. Monastir, then renamed Bitola, was in the territory incorporated by Serbia. However, the Jewish community continued to call the city by the name it bore during centuries of Ottoman rule: Monastir.

At the turn of the twentieth century, Monastir's Jewish population reached nearly 11,000, but by 1914 years of emigration had reduced the community to just over 6,000. During World War I, Monastir suffered two invasions and two years of bombardment. More than 5,000 Monastir Jews fled their homes and lived as refugees in the surrounding area. When the war was over, Monastir's Jews numbered just over 3,000. Bitola became part of the new state of Yugoslavia, and in the 1920s and 1930s Zionism emerged as the dominant force among the local Jewish youth. During those years, 500 of these young men and women emigrated to Palestine.

== Monastir during the Holocaust ==
In 1941, some 78,000 Jews lived in Yugoslavia, including about 4,000 foreign or stateless Jews who had found refuge in the country during the 1930s. Although Yugoslavia had reluctantly joined the Axis alliance with Germany, the Yugoslav government was toppled by an anti-German military coup on March 27, 1941. Nazi Germany invaded the Balkan nations of Yugoslavia and Greece in early April 1941. Supported militarily by her Axis allies (Italy, Bulgaria, Hungary, and Romania), Germany quickly subdued the Balkans. Yugoslavia was partitioned among the Axis allies. Bulgaria annexed Yugoslav Macedonia (the area including the cities of Skopje and Bitola in southern Yugoslavia).

On October 4, 1941, the Bulgarians enforced an extraordinary measure that prohibited the Jews of Yugoslav Macedonia from engaging in any type of industry or commerce. All existing Jewish businesses had three months to transfer ownership to non-Jews or sell their assets and close down. In addition, a law that barred Jews from certain areas of town was enforced in Monastir in late 1941. Jews who lived in the more prosperous part of Monastir, located on the east side of the Dragor River, were forced to move to a poorer part of town located near the traditional Jewish quarter on the west side, and this area became the ghetto.

With Monastir's Jews forced into a ghetto and registered, it became easier to carry out the theft of their property. On July 2, 1942, the Bulgarian government demanded that all Jewish households hand over 20 percent of the value of all assets, including property, furniture, cash, and household items. Committees were established to assess the value of the Jews' property. The possessions of those who did not have the money to pay the tax were sold at auction.

All of these degrading, restrictive measures halted normal Jewish life in Monastir. Žamila Kolonomos, a local Jewish woman, lived through these years of occupation in Monastir. She wrote, "Ansina la vida si truko i no avia mas ni enkontros, ni fiestas, ni bodas, ni aligrias" (Thus life was so greatly changed and there were no more get-togethers, no festivals, no weddings, no celebrations).

Though allied with the Germans, the Bulgarian government refused to deport Jews residing in Bulgaria proper. Bulgarian authorities did, however, deport Jews without Bulgarian citizenship from the territories of Yugoslavia and Greece which Bulgaria occupied. They deported the Macedonian Jews in simultaneous actions that began in the early morning of Thursday, March 11, 1943. In Monastir, Skopje, and Štip, where there was a tiny population of Sephardic Jews, several hundred police and soldiers, as well as cart drivers with their carts, gathered at municipal police stations at 2 a.m. to receive instructions for the removal of the Jews and their belongings. In Monastir, the Bulgarian military established a blockade around the city to prevent escapes.

Between 5 and 6 a.m., groups fanned out into the ghetto to bang on doors and order the residents to leave their homes in one hour. The Jews were told that they were being transferred to other parts of Bulgaria and that after the war they would be returned to their homes, but this did little to ease the terror and confusion of this massive eviction. Advance rumors of this action convinced Kolonomos to hide, and that night she and four others sat in a windowless room in a shop and listened to what was happening to their community. Kolonomos wrote,

At dawn we heard the uproar of groups of police. In a moment there was the sound of horses' footsteps and the noise of carts. Then all was calm. Then came a noise like thunder….We asked each other what it could be? Then we were able to discern the sound of voices, shouts, the crying of many people, of babies, of women! We were able to distinguish the words of the Bulgarians who shouted: 'Quickly! Quickly!' The prayers, moans, curses, the crying was clear… They were taking all the Jews, old and young, not just the youths who could work…. A river of people passed alongside us.

At around 7 a.m. the Jews were forced to walk to the railroad station, where a train was waiting to take them away to neighboring Skopje; a temporary detention center had been established at the state tobacco monopoly warehouse known as Monopol. The Monopol was chosen for its ability to hold thousands of people, and also because it was served by a railroad. Albert Sarfati survived the war, and he gave this eyewitness account:

They loaded us into cattle wagons, fifty to sixty people per wagon, including luggage. There wasn't enough space and many had to stand. There was no water. The children were crying … A woman in one wagon was giving birth… but there was no doctor. We reached Skopje at midnight. Night. Darkness. They opened the wagons and in the darkness pushed us into two large buildings. Cars carrying the Jews from Shtip had been added to our train. Stumbling over one another in the darkness, dragging our luggage and continuously being beaten by the Bulgarian soldiers, the children, the aged and infirm tried to squeeze into the building. When the sun rose, we realized we were in Skopje in the building of the Monopoly, and that all the Jews of Macedonia had been rounded up that same day.

For the next 11 days the Monastir Jews, together with Jews from Skopje and Štip, approximately 7,215 in all, lived in crowded, filthy conditions in four warehouses at Monopol. The weather was cold, there was little food and few blankets, and the Jews were continually searched, beaten, and humiliated. Women and girls were raped. Elena Leon Ishakh, a doctor from Monastir who was released from Monopol to work for the Bulgarians, survived the war and left this description of the Monopol:

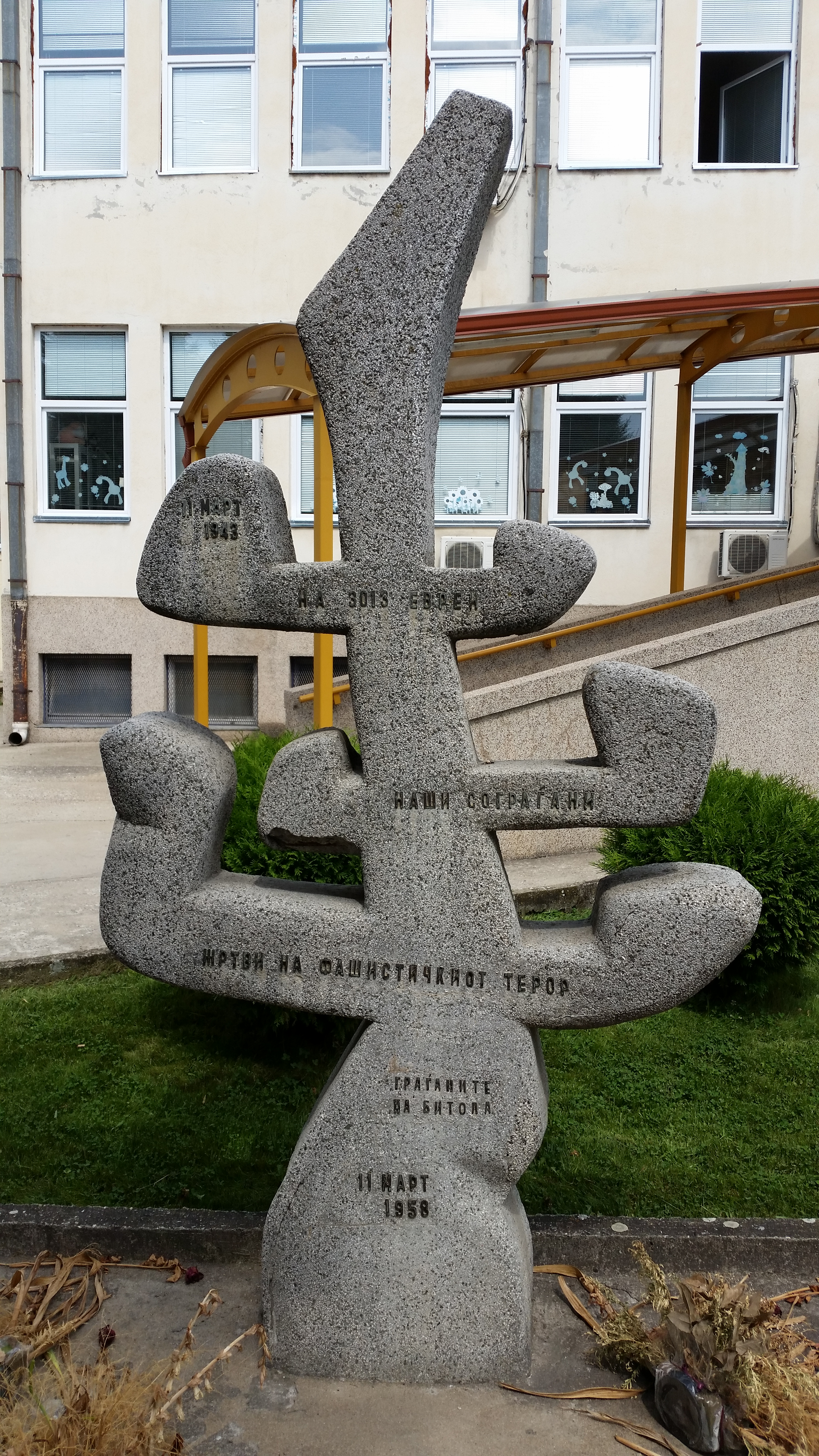
Memorial monument for deported Jews in Monastir

Hunger pervaded… Only on the fifth day did the camp authorities set up a kitchen, but for over 7,000 of us there were too few stoves. Food was doled out starting at eleven in the morning, and the last ones were fed around five in the evening. Food was distributed once daily and consisted of 250 grams of bread and plain, watery beans or rice... They also gave us smoked meat, but it was so bad that, despite our hunger, we couldn't eat it... Under the pretext of searching us to find hidden money, gold, or foreign currency, they sadistically forced us to undress entirely... In some cases they even took away baby diapers... If anything was found on somebody, he was beaten….

Nico Pardo was one of the few who managed to escape from the Skopje detention center and after the war he described the Jews' despair in Monopol:

We were in a terrible mood. The youngsters tried to sing every so often, but the adults and the elderly people were in deep depression. We did not know what awaited us, but the dreadful treatment we received from the Bulgarians showed the value of the promises given us that we would only be taken to a Bulgarian work camp. Here and there youngsters whispered of the possibility of an uprising and a mass escape, but they never materialized. There was no prospect of it succeeding. The yard was surrounded by a wooden fence and behind that a barbed wire fence. At each of the four corners there was a sentry with a machine gun and other armed guards would patrol the yard. Also, the belief that the worst possible fate did not await us prevented such suicidal acts from taking place.

Three railroad transports took the Macedonian Jews from Monopol to Treblinka. The journey typically took six days, and during this time the Jews were locked in cattle or freight cars. Several Jews died during each transport, and the living had to endure the presence of corpses. On the morning of March 22, 1943, some 2,300 Macedonian Jews from Monopol were forced to board a train consisting of 40 cattle cars. Families journeyed together, and the transport included at least 134 small children no more than four years old, and at least 194 children between the ages of four and 10. The train arrived at Treblinka six days later on March 28 at 7 a.m. Four people died on this transport. The overwhelming majority of these Jews were from Skopje.

On March 25, German and Bulgarian soldiers loaded about 2,400 Macedonian Jews onto a train made up of freight cars. All the Jews from Štip, who numbered 551, were on this second transport, as were about 2,000 Jews from Skopje and Monastir. Sarfati was scheduled to board the third transport, and he watched the Jews board this second train:

Each wagon carried between 60 and 70 people with all their baggage. The people came out of the building carrying their belongings on their backs. Everyone was carrying things, from the oldest person to the youngest. With bowed heads, all approached the black train. In front of each wagon stood a German and a Bulgarian policeman checking off a list. It was impossible to sit down in the freight cars. As soon as the 'livestock' had been loaded into a car, it was locked and sealed. Only heads were visible through the small windows... Those of us in the building were not permitted to watch, and the police waved their machine guns toward our windows to keep us from watching. The train was ready and left about eleven o'clock. Hands were waving goodbye from the small wagon windows and all of us in the building were shedding tears.

The last train carried around 2,400 Jews, approximately 2,300 of whom were from Monastir. The Jews began boarding the freight cars at 6 a.m. on March 29 and by noon the train was full. The departure of this train for the killing center at Treblinka signaled the final destruction of the Monastir Jewish community.

== The Monastir photograph collection ==
Photographs of nearly every Jewish adult in Monastir, more than half the community, were collected by the Bulgarian authorities in the first half of 1942. Though many of the Jewish inhabitants of eastern Europe were required to submit photographs for purposes of police registration, work permits, and ration cards both inside and outside ghettos established by Germany or its Axis allies, few of these photograph collections survived the war intact. The Monastir registration photographs constitute one of these rare collections.

The origins of the Monastir photograph collection lay in the directive given by the Bulgarian occupation authorities in early 1942 to the Jews of Monastir, then recently concentrated in a ghetto, to submit photographs of all family members above the age of 13. While some of the submitted photos were newly taken for this purpose, others were older family snapshots dating from the 1890s to the early 1940s. Most of the photographs are head shots of individual adults, but some are group portraits of two, three, or more family members.

Apparently, these photographs were reproduced by the Bulgarian authorities; one complete set now exists at the North Macedonia State Archives, captioned in the 1950s, while another set was cut and pasted into police register books produced by the Bulgarian authorities in 1942. These police registers were recovered after the war and turned over to the Union of Jewish Communities of Yugoslavia. Years later they were donated to Yad Vashem in Jerusalem, but not before a large percentage of the photos were removed by survivors.

The photographs are currently available at the United States Holocaust Memorial Museum.

== Gallery ==
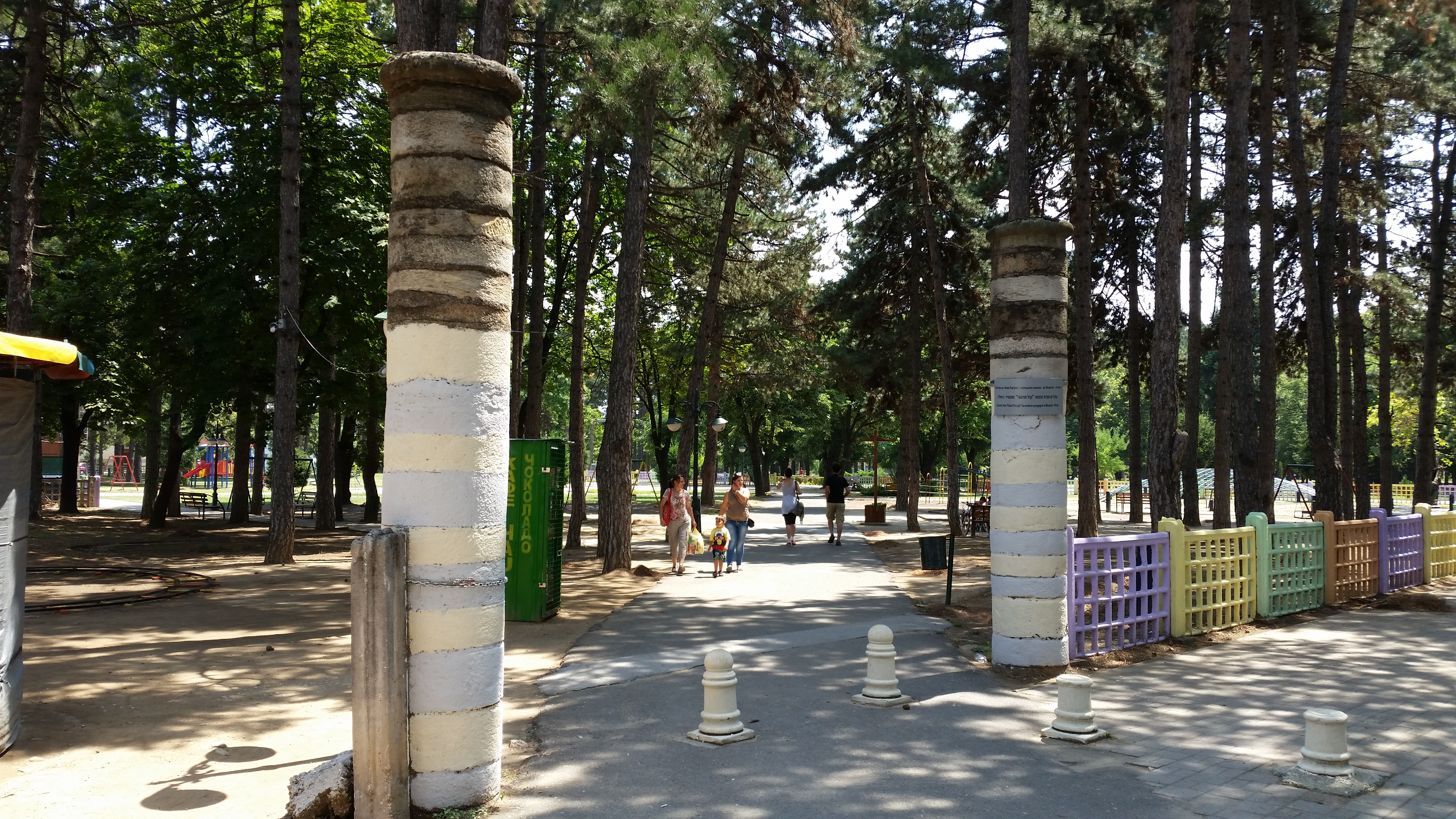
Columns of the destroyed Kal Portugal (Portugal Synagogue)

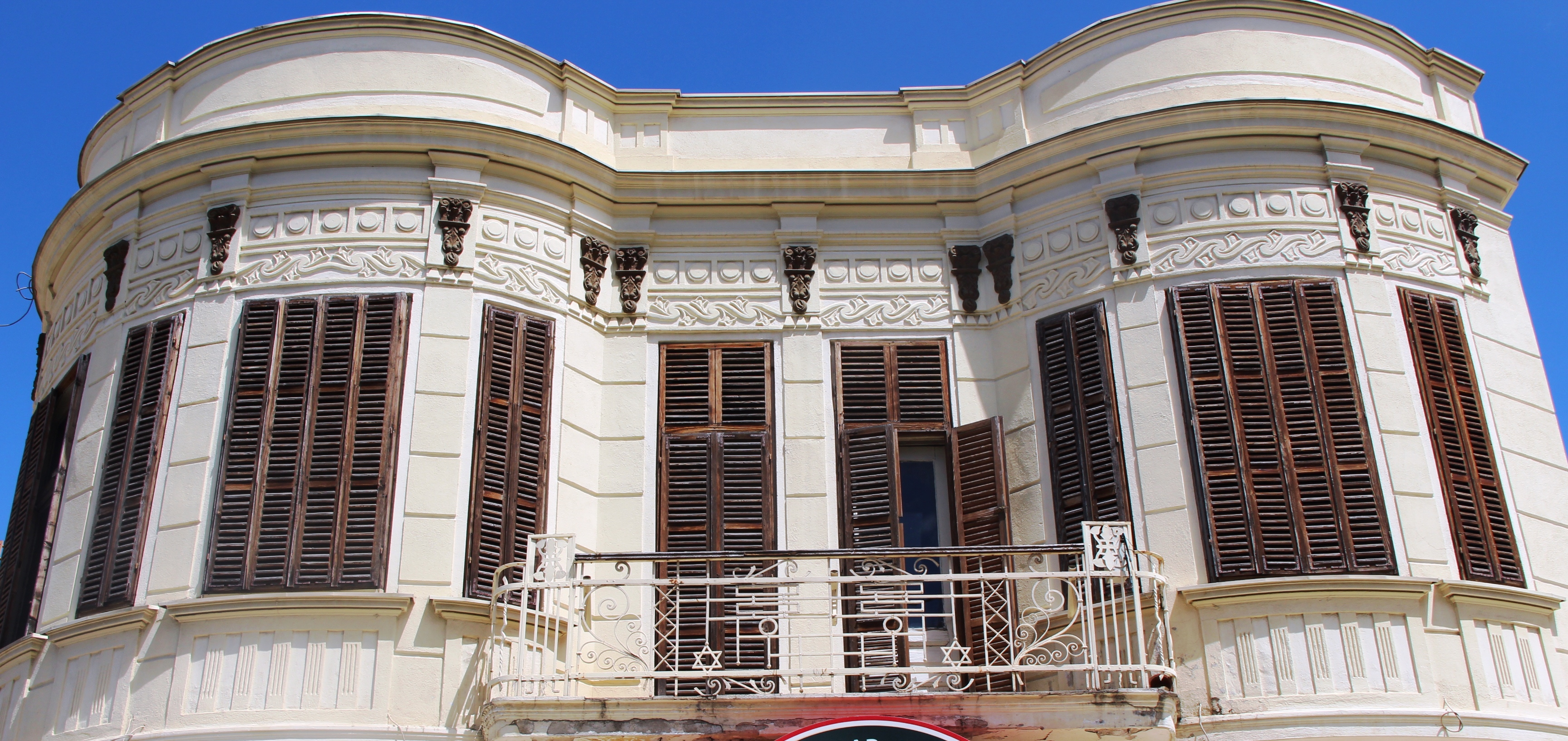
Aroeste house

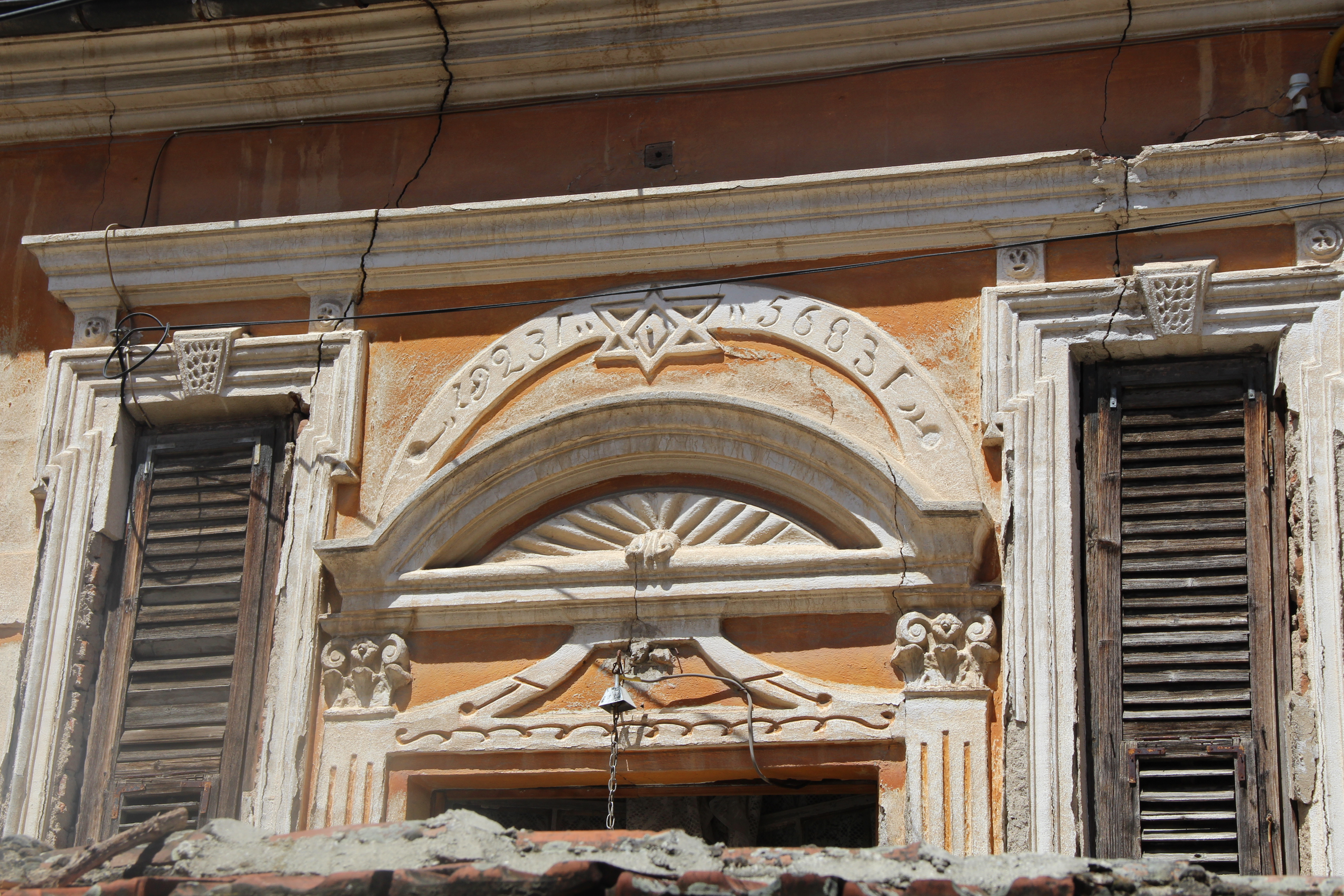
Deserted Jewish house

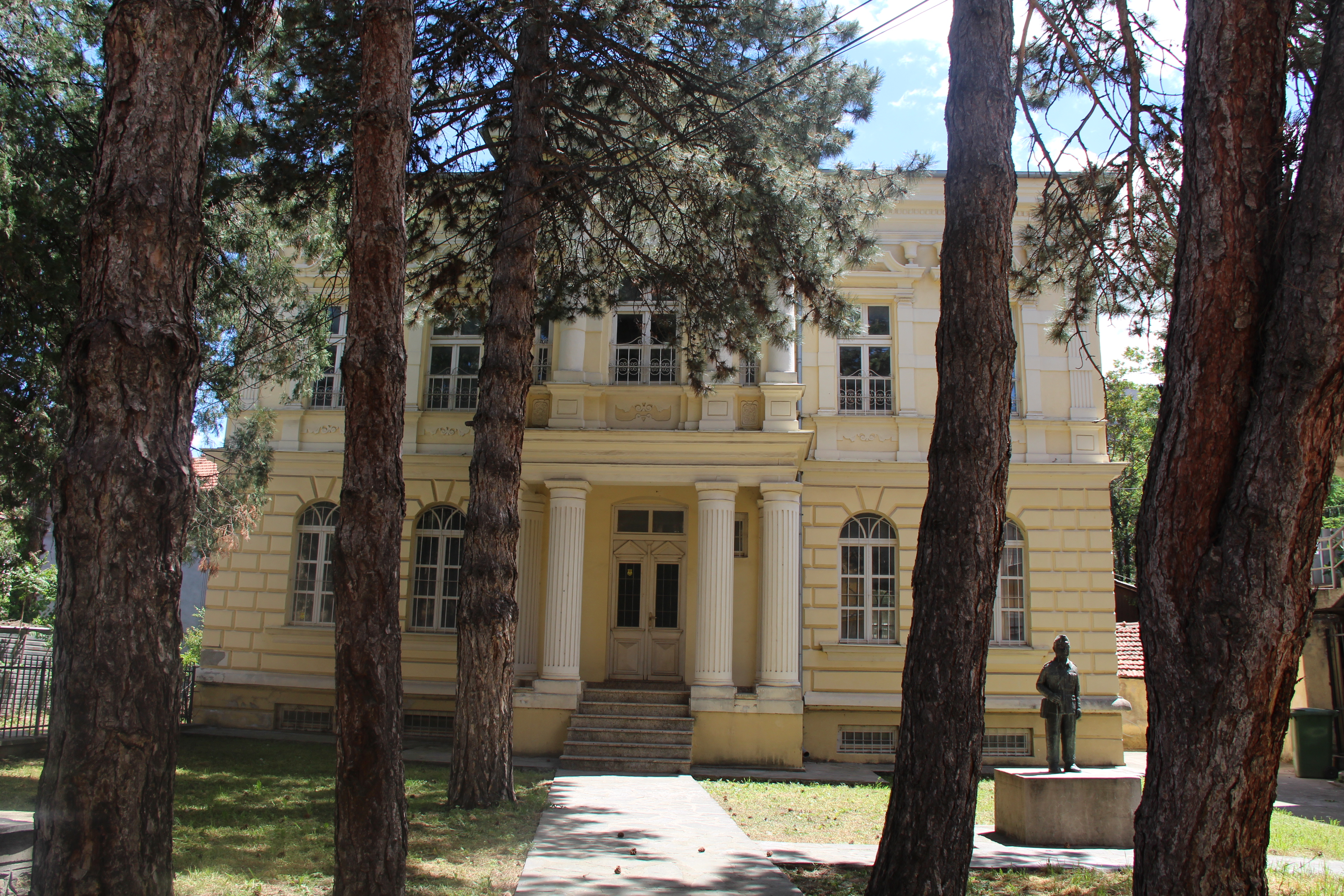
Old Kamchi house which was donated to Hashomer Hatzair

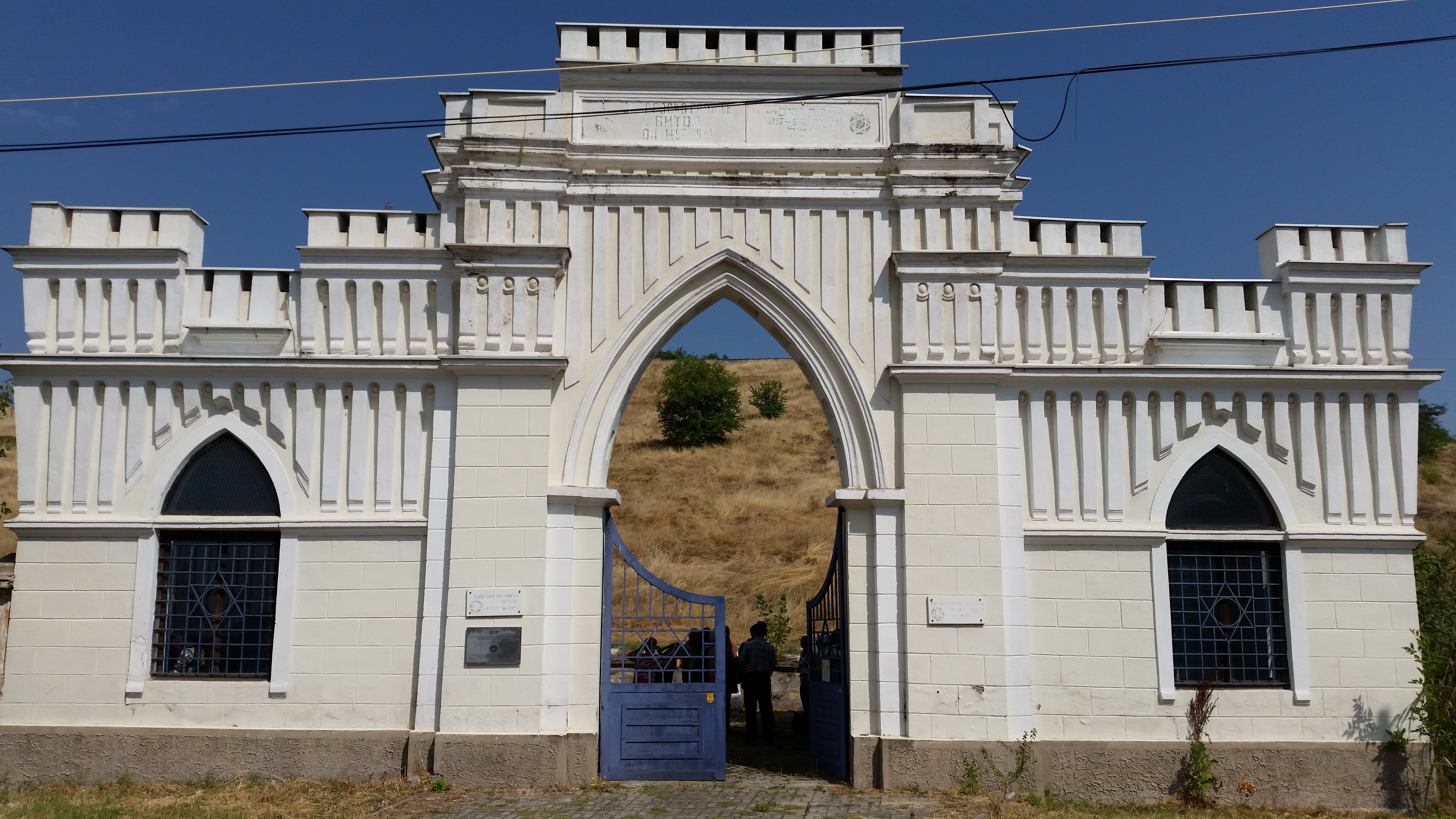
Entrance to the Monastir Jewish Cemetery

== Notable persons ==
- Julia Batino (1914–1942), antifascist and women's rights activist
- Rafael Moshe Kamhi (1870–1970), revolutionary
- Žamila Kolonomos (1922–2013), partisan, writer, and activist
- Estreya Haim Ovadya (1922–1944), partisan

== Notes ==
This article incorporates text from the United States Holocaust Memorial Museum, and has been released under the GFDL.
