= Sofija Grandakovska =

Macedonian writer (born 1973)

Prof. Dr. Sofija Grandakovska
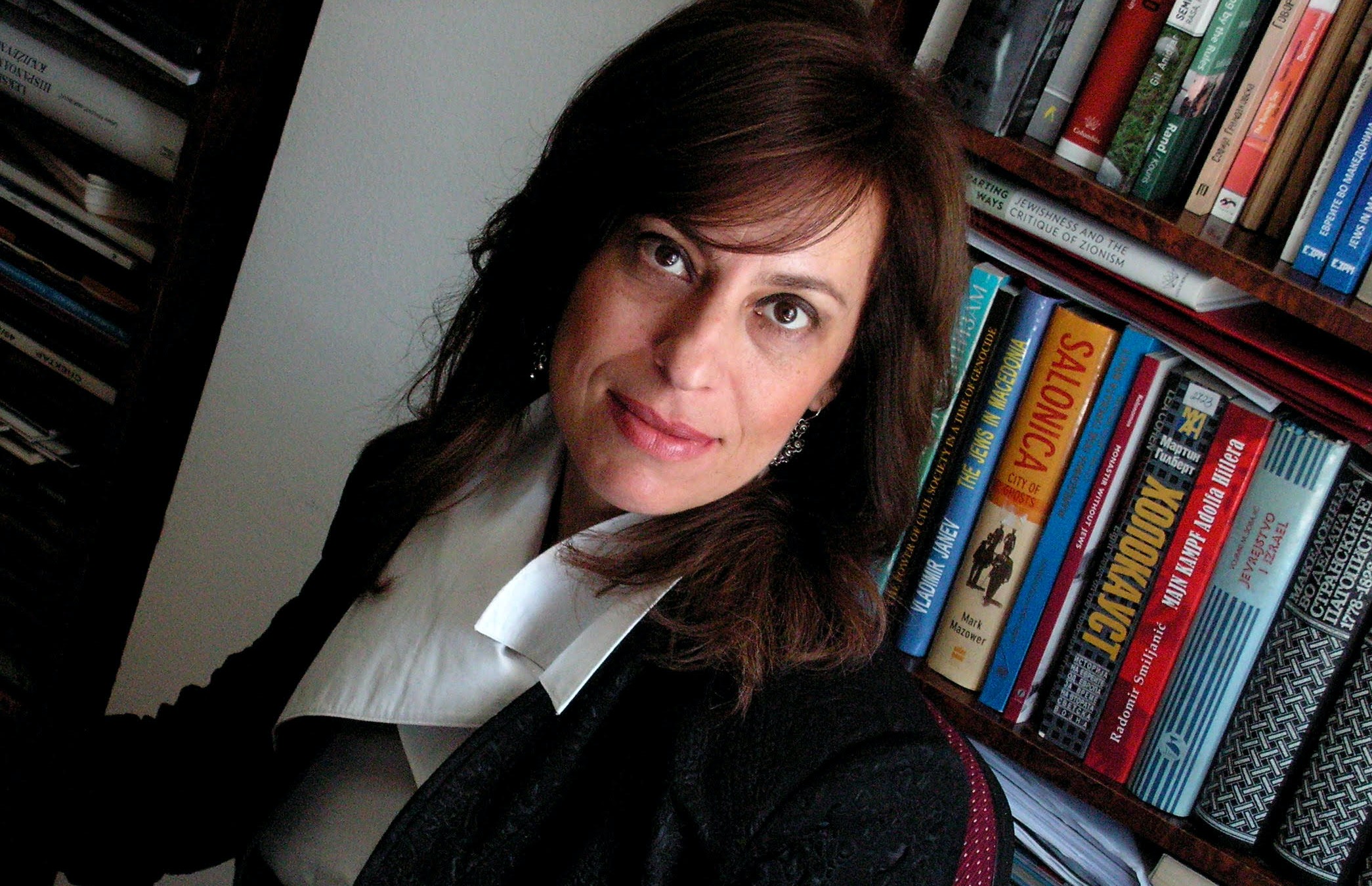
- Sofija Grandakovska
- Known for: Jewish and Holocaust history in North Macedonia; Macedonian cultural heritage
- Awards: Vita Pop-Jordanova Award from the Macedonian Academy of Sciences and Arts (2006); Certificate of gratitude from the Directorate for Protection of the Cultural Heritage of Macedonia (2013)
- Scientific career
- Fields: Comparative literature studies and interdisciplinary studies in Holocaust, Jewish history, literature and culture; Jewish and Holocaust history in the Balkans; Byzantine studies
- Institutions: Ss. Cyril and Methodius University of Skopje; Serbian Academy of Sciences and Arts; Singidunum University; Yad Vashem; Center for Jewish History; John Jay College of Criminal Justice
- Website: Sofija Grandakovska

Sofija Grandakovska (Cyrillic: Софија Грандаковска, Romanized: Sofiya / Sofía Grandakovska) (born 1973) is an academic, poet and author in the field of comparative literature studies and interdisciplinary studies in Holocaust, Jewish history, literature and culture, with a specialization in the Jewish and Holocaust history in the Balkans. Another area of interest is Byzantine studies. She has significant publications in literary and visual semiotics, literary theory, critics and interpretation and art.

== Career ==
=== Education and work ===
Sofija Grandakovska received a bachelor's degree (1999), master's degree (2007) and doctorate (2009) (scientific compartment) from the Department of Comparative Literature, Faculty of Philology "Blaže Koneski", Ss. Cyril and Methodius University of Skopje, North Macedonia. Her bachelor, master and doctoral dissertations are in the field of literary and visual semiotics.

In the bachelor's thesis Inter-medial Aspects of the Icon (theology, semiotics and modern abstract art) [Интермедијалните аспекти на иконата (теологија, семиотика, апстрактна уметност)] (1999), she applies the semiotic model of comparative study of literature and visual arts (medieval icon and modern abstract art) to explore the question: "Does the word precede the image, or the image precedes the word?". The thesis was later developed in the academic book The Portrait of the Image [Портретот на сликата] (2010).

In 2006, Grandakovska was awarded "Best Young Scientist of the Year Vita Pop-Jordanova Award" by the Macedonian Academy of Sciences and Arts, for her extraordinary academic work and internationally published research papers in the field of comparative literary studies.

Her 2007 master dissertation (published next year as The Discourse of the Prayer [Говорот на молитвата]) is focused on defining the discourse of prayer in an interdisciplinary range, from archaic manifestations to its literary phenomena in Jewish, Hellenic, Byzantine and Christian-Orthodox tradition and semiotics of anthropology.

Later in 2007, Grandakovska was nominated by the Department of Literature and Literary Science at the Macedonian Academy of Sciences and Arts for research program at the Serbian Academy of Sciences and Arts, in Belgrade. As a doctoral fellow at the Institute for Byzantine Studies and the Institute for Balkan Studies, she researched the topic "Historical Perspectives between old Hebrew poetry and Byzantine Literature", developed in the 2009 doctoral dissertation The Acathistos Hymn in the Context of Byzantine Hymnography [Богородичниот акатист во контекст на византиската химнографија], later published as The Acathistos Hymn Through Word and Fresco-painting [Неседалната химна низ слово и фреска] (2017).

In the spring of 2009, she was a fellow at apexart arts center, and later that year she became assistant professor in the field of cultural theory at the Institute for Social Sciences and Humanities Research "Euro-Balkan" (Skopje), where she taught in the period 2009 - 2013. In 2014, she was elected senior scientific associate / associate professor at Institute of National History, Ss. Cyril and Methodius University of Skopje.

In 2013 - 2014, Grandakovska was a post-doctoral fellow at the International Institute for Holocaust Research of Yad Vashem. Her research topic was "Holocaust in Macedonia: The Deportation of Macedonian Jews", delving into their unrecognized civic status and their treatment as non-Bulgarian citizens in the territory of Vardar Macedonia occupied, administrated and annexed by the Kingdom of Bulgaria, which led to their deportation to Treblinka II as res nullius.

In 2016 - 2018, she was awarded a Saul Kagan Post-doctoral Fellowship in Advanced Shoah Studies by the Claims Conference for her research "The Jews from Macedonia and the Holocaust: Race, Citizenship, Deportation." Her interdisciplinary and inter-historical scientific investigation was focused on the questions of race and nation in the 20th century through the example of various Holocaust experiences of Macedonian Jews, including those from Vardar Macedonia and those residing on the territory of Yugoslavia. As a Saul Kagan Fellow, Grandakovska was associated with the Faculty of Media and Communications at the Singidunum University in Belgrade (Serbia).

In 2018, she was a visiting scholar at the Center for Jewish History (New York). Her research topic was "Parted Histories of the Sephardim from Monastir: Holocaust and the Migration to the States." The core focus of her research was centered at the settlement of the Sephardi Jews from the Macedonian town Monastir (Bitola), the so-called Monastirlis, in New York City, Indianapolis and Rochester, that occurred during three migratory waves in the period between 1900 and 1924. Grandakovska investigated their institutional (social, religious and professional) integration in the new American environment that provided a new geographical reference for this group and participated into a new cultural narrative of the 20th century history of these immigrant settlements.

Since 2019, Grandakovska is professor at John Jay College of Criminal Justice (City University of New York), at the Department of Anthropology. The subject she teaches explores matters of "culture and crime" manifested in violent form, with a particular emphasis on colonialism, war, and genocide in various societies, territories and times.

=== Comparative literature and cultural studies ===
Grandakovska authored several scholarly books on interdisciplinary studies of literature, art and culture.

The Discourse of the Prayer (2008) studies the phenomenon of prayer in human history and its origins, its pre-literary context, and its development in various civilizations and human ways of overcoming fear and seeking good. The book further studies the prayer as a literary genre in the Hellenistic, Jewish, Christian, Byzantine, and the Old Slavonic literatures.

The Portrait of the Image (2010) is a collection that unifies research carried out in twelve different themes, all connected to the interpretation of literary phenomena and of the forms of artistic and spiritual expression in the medieval and the contemporary epochs. The themes are presented as theoretical windows for the comprehension of the Macedonian cultural heritage, unifying several humanities' areas like archeology and her sub-disciplines, history of fine arts, art criticism, literary genres, cultural-historical analyses and the studies of the medieval church and contemporary spiritual culture.

The Acathistos Hymn Through Word and Fresco-painting (2017) is a multidisciplinary study of the ethics, aesthetics and poetics of the Christian-Orthodox Achatistos hymn in its terminological comprehension, historical, literary, theological, liturgical and visual context. The research delves into the literary text of the Acathistos, as well as its transformation in the art of painting (like the example of the painted cycle in the church "St. Demetrius" within Marko's Monastery near Skopje).

Miniatures and Maximums (2020) is a collection of literary scientific critical studies and essays on a range of topics, with the point of contact around the role of the literature in the contemporary social context. The five parts of the book are dedicated to Ancient and Byzantine poetics and visual arts, Holocaust and Jewish history and culture (presented through archival documents on the Sephardi Jews in Ottoman Macedonia and the Sephardic literature), modern discourses of war, anthropology and deconstruction of the centers of power, contemporary Macedonian literature and shifts in the modern world literature challenged by the Russian avant-garde prose.

=== Jewish and Holocaust history in the Balkans ===
Grandakovska led the 2010–2011 international project "The Jews from Macedonia and the Holocaust", which materialized in a chrestomathy and an exhibition. The project was conducted in the context of dearth of studies about the fate of the Jews from Vardar Macedonia during the Second World War. She is editor, author of the foreword and a co-author of the bilingual chrestomathy The Jews from Macedonia and the Holocaust: History, Theory, Culture [Евреите од Македонија и холокаустот: историја, теорија, култура] (2011). The book is structured as an interdisciplinary and intertextual approach, covering three major aspects of discussion regarding the Holocaust: history, culture and theory. It consists of original texts of 14 authors, as well as archival and photographic material.

Grandakovska is also a writer of the catalogue and co-curator (together with Žaneta Vangeli, the designer of the exhibition) of the multimedia exhibition The Jews from Macedonia and the Holocaust (Macedonian Academy of Sciences and Arts, Skopje, 2011, and Gallery of the Jewish Community, Belgrade, 2013), as a visual replica on the discursive level of the chrestomathy. The documentary film The Jews from Macedonia and the Holocaust, based on her research and collection of documents, was realized by Zaneta Vangeli and produced by the Institute for Social Sciences and Humanities Research "Euro-Balkan" (2011).

Grandakovska has managed the first Summer School in Holocaust studies "The Diverse Survival Strategies of Jewish and Roma Communities in Macedonia: From Resistance to Memorialization" (2011) in North Macedonia, attended by young scholars from European countries and complemented by follow-up activities.

In 2011–2012, she worked with Michael Berenbaum and served as professional consultant and researcher for the conceptual development of the project "Permanent Exhibition of the Holocaust Memorial Museum for the Jews from Macedonia" for the Berenbaum Group (Los Angeles, California). She was consultant, researcher and writer on the segment focused on the deportation of the Jews from Macedonia and the reorganization of the Jewish community in the Socialist Republic of Macedonia after the World War Two from the documentary film The Jews from Macedonia, directed by Dejan Dimeski, produced by the Macedonian National Television and the Ministry of Culture of Macedonia (2016–17).

In 2018, Grandakovska was principal researcher for Macedonia at the European Holocaust Research Infrastructure and author of the study on the project to identify Holocaust-relevant legal cases, including major trials in Macedonia. Another area of her research on this topic is the fate of the Macedonian Jews who, during World War II, happened to be outside Macedonia, in other territories occupied by the Nazis. She uncovered the names of about 200 Macedonian Jews murdered in the early phase of the Holocaust by the German occupier in Serbia and its collaborator, the quisling government of Milan Nedić and by the Ustashas in the Nazi satellite Independent State of Croatia.

=== Poetry ===
Grandakovska is the author of two bilingual books of poetry. The Eighth Day (2005) is described as a modern lyric mythological-poetic epic around holiness perceived and understood as light, a subject of yearning for man, while The Burning Sun (2009) as a type of a modern religious imagination that adopts the discourse of prayer as its semiotic framework for understanding an intimate form of communication with the sacredness.

== Background ==
Grandakovska's ancestors were Sephardi Jews from the neighborhoods Big Yard and New Synagogue of the Ottoman Monastir (nowadays Bitola). Her more recent ancestors were among the few who survived the Holocaust by changing their name.

== Works ==
Comparative literature and cultural studies

- sole author

- The Discourse of the Prayer [Говорот на молитвата] (2008)
- The Portrait of the Image [Портретот на сликата] (2010)
- The Achatistos Hymn Through Word and Fresco-painting [Неседалната химна низ слово и фреска] (2017)
- Miniatures and Maximums [Минујатури и максимали] (2020)

- co-editor and contributor (author):

- DOMA [HOME], vol. 0, a bilingual (English-Macedonian) book-zine edition, edited by Antonio Petrov, Sofija Grandakovska (2010)

Jewish and Holocaust history in the Balkans

- editor and co-author

- The Jews from Macedonia and the Holocaust: History, Theory, Culture [Евреите од Македонија и холокаустот: историја, теорија, култура] (2011)

Poetry

- The Eight Day [Осмиот ден] (2005)
- The Burning Sun [Препечено сонце] (2009)

Literary translations

- Sephardic Stories [Сефарски приказни] (2014), literary stories by Eliezer Papo, translation from Serbian to Macedonian
- Sarajevo Megila [Сараевска Мегила] (2014), novel by Eliezer Papo, translation from Serbian to Macedonian
- The Master and His Students [Учителот и неговите соговорници] (2016), novel by Eliezer Papo, translation from Serbian to Macedonian
- 54 poems and one verse [54 песни и еден стих] (2018), book of poetry by Aleksandar Petrov, translation from Serbian to Macedonian

== Awards ==
- Testimonial for academic and research work on cultural heritage in Macedonia (project The Female Monasticism in Macedonia), awarded by Ford Grant and the Museum of the City of Skopje (2004)
- Best Young Scientist of the Year Vita Pop-Jordanova Award from the Macedonian Academy of Sciences and Arts, for her extraordinary academic work and internationally published research papers in the field of Comparative Literary Studies, in accordance with international classification (2006)
- National Recognition by the Decision of the Government of the Republic of Macedonia regarding receiving the Vita Pop-Jordanova Award from the Macedonian Academy of Sciences and Arts (2006)
- Award as a sign of recognition for the affirmation of Ss. Cyril and Methodius University of Skopje regarding receiving the Vita Pop-Jordanova Award from the Macedonian Academy of Sciences and Arts (2006)
- Certificate of gratitude from the Directorate for Protection of the Cultural Heritage of Macedonia (of the Ministry of Culture), for her participation in a project of historical significance for the Republic of Macedonia, Macedonia: Millennial Cultural and Historical Facts (2013)
