= A History of the Jews in Macedonia =

1982 Macedonian history book

- Author: Aleksandar Matkovski
- Language: Macedonian, English
- Subject: History of the Jews in Macedonia
- Publisher: Skopje: Macedonian Review Editions
- Publication date: 1982 - in Macedonian; 1983 - in English
- Publication place: Socialist Republic of Macedonia

A History of the Jews in Macedonia is a history book by Aleksandar Matkovski, published in Macedonian in 1982 and in English in 1983. It was the first Macedonian language book on the topic of the history of the Jews in Macedonia.

== Background ==
In April 1941, the Bulgarian army in alliance with Nazi Germany occupied Vardar Macedonia. On 11 March 1943, the Bulgarian authorities rounded up most of the local Jews and handed them over to the Germans, who transported them to the Treblinka extermination camp. They were gassed on arrival, and none are known to have survived. This had a devastating impact on the Macedonian Jewish communities. From an estimated antebellum population of almost 8000 Macedonian Jews, only a few hundred survived the war.

Further on, a combination of circumstances determined little awareness about the fate of those people. None of those sent to Treblinka are known to have survived to tell the story. After the war, Vardar Macedonia became again part of Yugoslavia, in its new iteration as the Communist Yugoslavia. The official line was of avoiding delving into the crimes of World War II, as they were considered to be capable of potentially destabilizing the internal inter-ethnic Yugoslav relations. This was to some extent relaxed in the Macedonian case, as the perpetrators were German and Bulgarian occupiers. Nevertheless, the mentioning of the fate of the Macedonian Jews was minimal.

== Past publications ==
For several decades, Aleksandar Matkovski was the only historian involved in researching the topic of the Holocaust of the Jews in Macedonia. His first known text is a monograph which circulated in several languages and formats. The earliest available version of the study is a typewritten manuscript of 91 pages written in Serbo-Croatian and dated 1957 (kept at the Yad Vashem library alongside a translation into Hebrew). During the next five years, Matkovski's research was published in Macedonian (Glasnik, 1958, the journal of the Macedonian Institute for National History), in Hebrew and English (Yad Vashem Studies, 1959), and in a shortened version in a Macedonian newspaper with a large circulation (Nova Makedonija, 1961) before it was turned into a Macedonian-language book titled The Tragedy of the Jews from Macedonia (1962).

The study opened with a short depiction of the history of the Macedonian Jews up to 1941. This description was followed by a minute examination of anti-Jewish policies, the roundups and internment of the Jews at the temporary detention center in Skopje, their deportation, and the subsequent liquidation and plundering of Jewish properties. The account drew from a wide array of archival records from the Bulgarian Commissariat for Jewish affairs, the Bulgarian Ministry of the Interior, the Yugoslav Federal and Republican commissions on war crimes, the Military Historical Institute in Belgrade, Yugoslav and Macedonian Jewish communal institutions, as well as the Macedonian state archives. Also included in the analysis was the German deportation list drawn at the Skopje camp.

Like most scholars at the time, Matkovski had not been granted access to the Bulgarian state archives, but he had consulted copies of the documents available at the Macedonian state archives in Skopje and the Military Historical Institute in Belgrade. The Bulgarian authorities promoted the narrative of the "rescue" of the Bulgarian Jews from the "Old Kingdom", while avoiding the facts of the extermination in the occupied Vardar Macedonia, Western Thrace and the Pirot region. The Bulgarian international diplomacy sought to spread the "rescuing" narrative and it gained significant traction. In this context, the significance of Matkovski's contribution was that for several decades it was the only documented source with significant global circulation about the fate of the Macedonian Jews under Bulgarian occupation in World War II. It came to be known to the majority of scholars worldwide who dealt with the Holocaust in the Balkans.

== Content ==
In 1982, Matkovski published an extended version of the 1962 book, titled A History of the Jews in Macedonia, with a widening of the temporal and geographic scope of the analysis. It is not only about Vardar Macedonia, but the entire region of Macedonia, which had been carved up between Serbia, Greece and Bulgaria following the Balkan Wars (1912–1913). It also has an expanded coverage of the history of the Macedonian Jews from antiquity to 1941.

The chapter "The Deportation and Liquidation of the Jews of Macedonia" updates the previous book. It describes in detail the political, diplomatic and legal preparation of the deportation by the Bulgarian authorities and their German allies, the personnel and the organization of the concentration camp in the "Monopol" Tobacco Factory in Skopje and the three train transports to Treblinka. Matkovski put also a focus on the liquidation of Jewish property, which tended to be neglected in other studies.

Four years later, in 1986, the German and Bulgarian archival materials were translated into Macedonian and their publication was coordinated by former partisan Žamila Kolonomos and historian Vera Vesković-Vangeli. Together with other documents gathered by the editors, they turned into the book The Jews in Macedonia during the Second World War (1941-1945).

== See also ==
- The Jews from Macedonia and the Holocaust (2010-2011 project)
