= Julia Batino =

Women's rights activist

Julia Batino (Monastir, Kingdom of Serbia 1914 – Jasenovac, 1942) was a Macedonian Jewish antifascist and women's rights activist. She was made President of the Bitola WIZO (Croatian ZICO Ženska Internacionalna Cionisticka Organizacija Women's International Zionist Organization) in 1934, an organization which was actively involved in the progressive women's movement in Yugoslavia.

Batino directed her energies towards the emancipation of Jewish women, particularly young women. Batino's connections to the Jewish community in Belgrade enabled her to send a certain number of Jewish girls from Bitola to work or study in Belgrade each year, among them Estreya Haim Ovadya, among the first women to join the Partisans in 1941.

Batino was killed in the Jasenovac concentration camp in 1942.

== See also ==
- History of the Jews in North Macedonia
- History of the Jews in Monastir
