= The Jews from Macedonia and the Holocaust =

"The Jews from Macedonia and the Holocaust" was an international research project realized by the (formerly known as: Institute for Social Sciences and Humanities "Euro-Balkan") Euro-Balkan University in Skopje, North Macedonia, at the Department for Cultural and Visual Research in 2010–2011. It was led by Prof. Dr. Sofija Grandakovska and it materialized in a chrestomathy and an exhibition with the same name.

== Project ==
The project "The Jews from Macedonia and the Holocaust" was supported by the Education, Audiovisual and Culture Executive Agency (Brussels) within the Action 4 Program and it followed the general subject Active European Remembrance aiming at preserving the sites and archives associated with deportations as well as the commemorating of victims of Nazism and Stalinism. The central subject of scientific interest was the destiny of 7,148 Jews from Macedonia murdered in 1943 in the gas chambers of Treblinka II (Poland), their culture and ontology, but also the complex discourse of the post-Holocaust theoretic thought. The aim was to initiate a serious academic discussion on the presence of the Jewish discourse as an inclusive factor in the establishment of the pre-Holocaust, the Holocaust and post-Holocaust historical and socio-cultural image of North Macedonia. The project developed with an interdisciplinary approach, with the involvement of experts from different fields.

== Background ==
In April 1941, the Bulgarian army in alliance with Nazi Germany occupied Vardar Macedonia. On 11 March 1943, the Bulgarian authorities rounded up most of the local Jews and handed them over to the Germans, who transported them to the Treblinka extermination camp. They were gassed on arrival, and none are known to have survived. This had a devastating impact on the Macedonian Jewish communities. From an estimated antebellum population of almost 8000 Macedonian Jews, only a few hundred survived the war.

Further on, a combination of circumstances determined little awareness about the fate of those people. None of those sent to Treblinka are known to have survived to tell the story. After the war, Vardar Macedonia became again part of Yugoslavia, in its new iteration as the Communist Yugoslavia. The official line was of avoiding delving into the crimes of World War II, as they were considered to be capable of potentially destabilizing the internal inter-ethnic Yugoslav relations. This was to some extent relaxed in the Macedonian case, as the perpetrators were German and Bulgarian occupiers. Nevertheless, the mentioning and, even less, the study of the fate of the Macedonian Jews was minimal. Only the historian Aleksandar Matkovski published in 1958, 1962 and 1982 increasingly detailed accounts of the course of events. He made use of Yugoslav, as well as Bulgarian archival material available in Yugoslavia and described in detail the diplomatic, political and legal preparation of the deportation by Bulgarian authorities and their German allies, the personnel and the organization of the concentration camp for Jews in the Tobacco Factory in Skopje and the three transports by Bulgarian State Railway to Treblinka.

Matkovski's update of 1983, A History of the Jews in Macedonia, served as a blueprint for a document edition of 1,500 pages published in 1986 by the Macedonian Academy of Sciences and Arts, titled The Jews in Macedonia during the Second World War (1941-1945) (co-edited by Vera Vesković-Vangeli and Žamila Kolonomos). The archival basis of this collection are documents from Macedonian and other Yugoslav archives as well as document copies from Bulgarian, German and other European archives in the possession of Yugoslav archives. The same as for Aleksandar Matkovski, the editors did not have direct access to archives in neighboring Bulgaria. After the war, the Bulgarian authorities sought to promote the narrative of the "rescue" of the Bulgarian Jews from the "Old Kingdom", while avoiding the facts of the extermination in the occupied Vardar Macedonia, Western Thrace and the Pirot region.

For a long time, Matkovski's works and the 1986 collection of archival documents were the only significant studies about the fate of the Macedonian Jews in World War II. The 2010–2011 project aimed to expand the scope of research and the spectrum of interdisciplinary angles around this topic. Another aspect is that, unlike in the previous Communist period, the Bulgarian archives are open to scholars. The project itself was a rather singular event in an otherwise sparse scholarship on this topic.

== Chrestomathy ==
The Jews from Macedonia and the Holocaust: History, Theory, Culture
- Editor: Sofija Grandakovska
- Original title: Евреите од Македонија и холокаустот: историја, теорија, култура
- Language: English/Macedonian versions
- Subject: The Holocaust
- Publisher: Evro-Balkan press
- Publication date: 2011
- Publication place: North Macedonia
- ISBN: 978-9989-136-75-7 (Macedonian language edition: ISBN 978-9989-136-74-0)

The chrestomathy The Jews from Macedonia and the Holocaust: History, Theory, Culture [Евреите од Македонија и холокаустот: историја, теорија, култура] was published in 2011 by Sofija Grandakovska, as editor, author of the foreword and co-author. The book has an interdisciplinary and intertextual approach, it consists of fourteen original works, created by the authors for this publication and it is structured in three parts. It includes archival material that is of closer importance for the topic of the Holocaust in Macedonia as a result of the research process.

=== Synopsis ===
Sofija Grandakovska - Foreword: Homage on the Irony of Evil and on the Historical, Cultural and Theoretic Memory of the Holocaust

The foreword introduces an outline of the historical presence of the Jews in Macedonia, the genealogy of the structure of the Final Solution of the Jewish question in Europe, its implementation in Macedonia and the concept of personal testimony as a document of the passive Holocaust history. It further presents the structure and the interdisciplinary concept of the chrestomacy.

Section I: The Historical Narrative and Testimony as Passive History

1. Vera Vesković-Vangeli - Treblinka, Compilation of Documents On the Genocide of the Macedonian Jews in WW II

Vera Vesković-Vangeli introduces the historical presence of the Jews in Macedonia since the times of the Roman Empire and their participation in its pre-Holocaust history. Then, with a selection of 49 documents, she traces the path that let to their destruction: the laws of the occupying Bulgarian authorities regarding the liquidation of Jewish assets and a complete exclusion of the Jewish population from social and economic life, the specific law that turned the Jews from Vardar Macedonia into people without citizenship, the minutes of the discussions between the Nazis and the Bulgarian authorities regarding the fate of the Jews, the creation of a Commissariat for Jewish Affairs at the Ministry of Interior and Public Health, the appointment of the Bulgarian officials who ordered the extermination, the agreement between the Bulgarian and Nazi German authorities to "resettle" the Jews, the reports about the rounding-up and temporary encampment, the bills, notes and delivery police reports about the special trains from Skopje to Treblinka, the analysis stating that the deportation of Jews from Macedonia and Thrace was completed successfully, testimonies of non-Macedonian survivors and of staff members about Treblinka, investigations of the liberators at the site of the camp.

2. Marija Pandevska - The Rescue of the Jews from (1941-1943): Options and Opportunities

Drawing from diaries, statements, testimonies of those who escaped deportation and death in Treblinka, Marija Pandevska creates an analysis of the objective conditions and the practicability of the opportunities for rescue operations. The authorities sought to keep the plan secret, many Jews did not believe the rumors about the preparations, the testimonies say that they were assured by Bulgarian Archimandrite Stefan and Bulgarian Archbishop Filaret in Bitola that nothing would happen. A few young Jews involved in the resistance of the Macedonian branch of the Communist Party of Yugoslavia and the Resistance Movement in Macedonia heeded the warning and absconded. Some of them entered the Partisan units of Macedonia and continued to share the fate of the Macedonian Partisans. Some of them were killed in battles and others managed to survive until the country was liberated.

3. Jasminka Namicheva - Human Fate Clenched Between a Yellow Badge and a Paper Envelope – A Kaleidoscope of the Jewish Holocaust in Macedonia

Newly discovered paper envelopes issued by the Bulgarian National Bank for storing Jewish objects of value and declarations of the immovable and movable property testify to the anti-Semitic laws adopted by the Bulgarian occupier and their implementation in Macedonia. They also bring to light the destiny of twenty-eight Jews with foreign citizenship in Macedonia, thought to have been murdered in Treblinka. These new artifacts found in the period between 2007 and 2010, apart from being valuable from an historical aspect, provide the possibility for another deliberation in a different context, as museums objects. The museum approach towards the archive material related to the Holocaust in Macedonia would deepen the interdisciplinary approach with new forms of discussion within the field of museology and the Holocaust.

4. Liljana Panovska - On the Jewish Deportation From Thessaloniki in 1943 (According to the Testimony of Rafael Kamhi)

The study follows the personal testimony of Rafael Moshe Kamhi, a participant in the Ilinden Uprising and an eyewitness to the deportation of the Macedonian Jews from Thessaloniki in 1943. The document, written in the Macedonian dialect of the Thessaloniki region, consists of a panoramic cross-section of the Jewish neighborhoods in Thessaloniki, the course of the deportation and the destruction of spiritual and material values of the Jewish culture. One of the points of significance of the study is the historic approach towards personal testimony and its archival importance in conveying the past, the extent a personal testimony presents an important methodological tool for the historic factography.

5. Žamila Kolonomos - How did I Survive the Holocaust?

The primary attribute of the Final Solution was the secrecy and determination of the perpetrators not to leave any trace of the crime, of personal or historic memory of it. Thus the narration of the Holocaust experience carries the structural element of resistance against oblivion, as a counterpoint for the knowledge of the murder of 7,148 Macedonian Jews, among who were the author's entire family. Žamila Kolonomos hailed from the Jewish community of Bitola and, shortly after the 1941 occupation, she joined the anti-fascist resistance. The personal testimony unfolds the increasingly unbearable situation of the Macedonian Jews, the warning of a leader of the Resistance to avoid staying at home around the days of the rumored deportation, the month spent in hiding in a tiny kiosk in the city, the escape to the partizans and the grueling life of guerrilla warfare, then in 1945, after the liberation, the news from those who escaped from the "Monopol Tobacco Warehouse" in Skopje about the horrors prior to the deportation by train to Treblinka.

Section II: How Culture Remembers?

6. Ivan Mikulčić - The Jews in Stobi

The section dedicated to the possibilities and forms of remembering the Jewish culture in Macedonia begins with an archeological study of the earliest Jewish community in Stobi. The layer of the Synagogue I, dating from the 2nd century CE, attests an economically powerful Jewish community. The excavations at the site called "House of Parthenius" indicate a rich house owner apparently keen on antique art, who commissioned art works according to his own artistic preferences. In fact, he managed to rescue parts of what was not destroyed by fanatic Christians at that time. Some specific details indicate he was a Jewish Samaritan. The author considers that the archeological artifacts are related to Joannes Stobaeus and that the library of the house was the place where he stored the manuscripts of the Greek authors, many of them thus saved from oblivion.

7. Nancy Hartman - The Holocaust in Macedonia

Nancy Hartman creates a photo-essay as a visual continuity of the Jewish community in Macedonia. Prewar photographs provided by family members of victims and survivors provide a glimpse into the vibrant cultural life of their communities: their families, schools, political activities, recreation, and religious life. In 1941 Bulgaria occupied Vardar Macedonia and enacted a series of anti-Semitic laws. Photographs from this period show Jewish families in difficult, crowded living conditions, and illustrate the attempt to carry on with daily activities despite the deprivations and persecution. In early 1942, Bulgarian authorities issued a directive that Jews were to register with the police, and submit photos of all family members over the age of thirteen. Of these, many appear to have been taken at the same studio, showing identical scenic backgrounds and similar formats. Early in the morning of March 11, 1943, the Macedonian Jews were rounded up and taken to the state tobacco monopoly warehouse known as Monopol. The photographs, likely taken by Bulgarian authorities, show dismal conditions and later on the Bulgarian officials overseeing their boarding on the trains to Teblinka. Only a few managed to avoid deportation, by going into hiding or by joining the resistance. Although these photographs are far less numerous, resisters’ portraits provide a counterpoint to the deportation ones. The photographs at the end of the war show the houses and synagogues occupied or destroyed, the few survivors struggling to rebuild their lives.

8. Krinka Vidaković-Petrov - Corpus of Sephardic Folklore from Macedonia

The study examines the importance of oral history as a significant chapter in cultural memory, which sustained every act created by the Sephardic cultural community in Macedonia and determined the distinction of its specific culture on this territory. It concerns with the effort made by the folklorists to maintain the cultural memory belonging to the Sephardic cultural community in Macedonia, via the earliest sacral and patrimonial poetic forms, and afterwards via their literary records.

9. Samuel Sadikario - In the City of the Dead

It is an artistic text in poetic-prose format as an allusion on the dead, on life turned into ashes, on deportation, on the bloodshed, but also on the memory of family objects and the home. The author conveys the inhuman behavior towards Jews and the indignity too immense for words to express the unjustified suffering.

10. Ivana Vučina Simović and Jelena Filipović - Judeo-Spanish Language in Bitola and Skopje: Between Tradition and Modernity

This is a study on the influence of modernity as a powerful sociological and ideological phenomenon on the traditional socio-cultural, religious and language practices and values of the Macedonian Sephardim. The discussion outlines the existence of different language ideologies. The Israelite Alliance aimed to westernize, with an accent on the French language, while the Zionist thought aimed to restore the Hebrew language as a language of all the Jews. Additionally, the incorporation of Vardar Macedonia in 1913 into the Kingdom of Serbia (later Kingdom of Yugoslavia) saw a policy of Serbianisation. The fact that Macedonia remained a part of the Ottoman Empire until 1913, accounted for a slower pace of modernization of all the ethnic groups living in its territory. Furthermore, poverty and overall socio-economic hardship of Sephardic communities in Macedonia made it even more difficult for them to take part in cultural and other changes based upon the model of Western European countries. Consequently, Judeo-Spanish in Macedonia was maintained longer than in other parts of Yugoslavia (particularly in Belgrade and in Sarajevo). The Holocaust brought about the disappearance of the Judeo-Spanish language among the Sephardic Jews in Macedonia.

11. Jovan Ćulibrk - The Holocaust of the Macedonian Jews in Historiography

Jovan Ćulibrk affirms two main positions in the study of the Holocaust in Macedonia, via its affiliation to Yugoslav historiography: the historical and the cultural narrative. The historical narrative demanded that the crimes that had happened during the World War II be avoided, as they were considered to be capable of potentially destabilizing the internal Yugoslav relations. In the official historiographic practice, the history of the Second World War became the history of the People's Liberation Struggle, as a symbol of the joint struggle of the abstract "antifascists of the Yugoslav nations and peoples" against the depersonalized enemies. On the other hand, the cultural narrative was considerably richer. In Macedonia, given that the perpetrators were Germans with Bulgarian support, the research on the fate of the Jews was, to a considerable degree, less restrained than in the rest of Yugoslavia, and the narrative of the Holocaust was considerably closer to the main historiographic stream of the Second World War historiography.

The 1990s, when the Yugoslav historiography on the Holocaust begun to integrate in the mainstream of science itself, were a specific period in which the research "has given answers to most of the basic questions", but on the other hand, a considerable deal of the questions raised by Yeshayahy A. Jelinek have remained open up until today. We know very little about the existing collaboration (especially about the local pro-Bulgarian elements), the by-standers, the inner life of the community during the years of suffering and the role of the Jewish self-government, the general attitude and the role of the Muslim citizens, the “conflict of "all against all" over looted Jewish property, about the reason why 95% of the Jews were murdered, the Jewish sources from that time, the art and literature created at that time and dealt with those questions, etc. What is missing in particular is a regional synthesis which would encompass the territory from Thessaloniki to Bitola, Priština and Skopje, a territory connected by the railroad that in 1943 served to cleanse the territory of the Jewish population in a single breath by the same villains.

Section III: THE Post-Holocaust and Its Theoretic Discourse

12. Tijana Milosavljević-Čajetinac - The Absence of Evil in the Republic (A Possible Dialogue between Plato and Hannah Arendt)

By way of comparative realizations, Tijana Milosavljević-Čajetinac juxtaposes the discourse of Plato's philosophy and post-Holocaust theoretic thought of Hannah Arendt, as an intersection between the practical and theoretic relations of evil. The example of the earliest ancient thought conveys the notion that evil does not strive towards causal or rational explanation on its existence, therefore evil cannot be a subject of knowledge, for there is no legal or moral explanation about it. The novelty introduced by the contemporary theory is that the question of evil is a fundamental subject in the post-Holocaust intellectual life of Europe and as such should have a privileged place in contemporary critical thought. While Plato regards evil as the absence of good, for Hannah Arendt evil demonstrates the most radical form in the totalitarian regime and its forms (the concentration camps) and determines it as different from all previous evils, since it is directed against humanity. In this context, the pathologization of evil is underlined: when carried out by many and organized in legitimate formation, it is very difficult to recognize it as such, for its executor is not an individual.

13. Sofija Grandakovska - On Holocaust Photography: Or when the memory practice of the victims is empty

The linguistic insufficiency to express the Holocaust event on discursive level suggests the necessity to consider it on so-called secondary levels, like the semiotics of the Holocaust photography. Defined as an event without an archetypical paradigm and a crime without a face, the typological determinant of the Holocaust is constituted as a modern archetype. Hence, because of the absence of the memory practice of the victims from Macedonia, with the methodology of the semiotic-hermeneutic frame, photography acquires a powerful memorial character; it is a documented testimony, language, historical document, a word on the secrecy of evil, on death as bio-political act, on bureaucracy of death and the terrorized relation between life and death, on the bourgeois relation of death and its institutionalization within the Nazi ideology in Europe and the Holocaust period.

14. Gil Anidjar - A Grammar of the Holocaust

The theoretic perspective presented in this discussion problematizes the question of the manner in which the Holocaust is phrased or named in relation to the syntagmatic determination of other events as holocaust. By comparing the discursive attempts to pluralize the event, the author underlines the determination of the Holocaust as an isolated event, singular and paradigmatic, and by discussing the Holocaust exceptionality through the theoretic post-Holocaust thought, the Holocaust indicates to a unique historical reality, i.e. that it is single. The other crucial question prompted by the discussion is the need to expand the geographic boundaries of Holocaust studies in the countries where it occurred, but where science failed to pay heed, like for instance, in North Macedonia.

== Exhibition ==
Another result of the project was a multimedia exhibition (co-curators: Žaneta Vangeli and Sofija Grandakovska), as a visual replica of the chrestomathy, held in 2011 at the Macedonian Academy of Sciences and Arts in Skopje and in 2013 at the Gallery of the Jewish Community in Belgrade.

== Further developments ==
The head of the project, Sofija Grandakovska mentioned that she found the Bulgarian scientific environment professional and cooperative in the research process and in later public lectures and discussions in Bulgaria about the topic. The stance of the scientific public regarding the question of Bulgaria's role in the Holocaust is not in the same line with the political one, which is characterized by revisionism, contradicting the researches and the critical position established by the scholarship. She gave also the example of 2013 Resolution of the Bulgarian Parliament, with the official position of regretting the deportation of 11,343 Jews from the Northern Greece and the Kingdom of Yugoslavia, condemning the criminal act, taken on Hitler's orders and regretting the fact that the local Bulgarian administration was not in a position to stop this act. However, the deportation was implemented by the Bulgarian authorities, fact confirmed later by perpetrators, like the Ministry of Interior at that time Petar Gabrovski. Additionally, the resolution does not assume responsibilities for the Bulgarian territorial expansion at that time, the Kingdom of Yugoslavia mentioned in the resolution as one of the areas where the extermination was perpetrated did not even exist after 1941.

The documentary film The Jews from Macedonia and the Holocaust, based on Sofija Grandakovska's research and collection of documents, was realized by Žaneta Vangeli and produced by the Institute for Social Sciences and Humanities Research "Euro-Balkan" (2011).

Grandakovska was consultant, researcher and writer on the segment focused on the deportation of the Jews from Macedonia and the reorganization of the Jewish community in the Socialist Republic of Macedonia after the World War Two from the documentary film The Jews from Macedonia, directed by Dejan Dimeski, produced by the Macedonian National Television and the Ministry of Culture of Macedonia (2016–17).
