= The Jews in Macedonia During the Second World War (1941–1945) =

1986 book

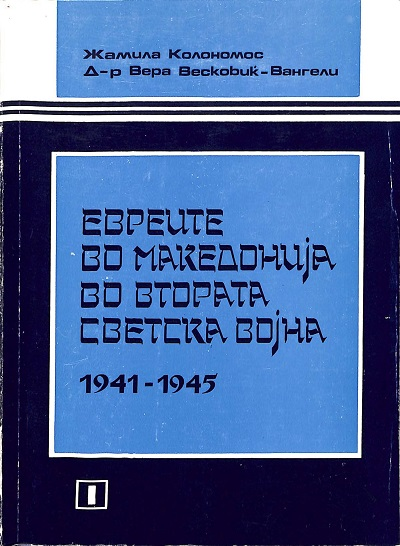
- Editors: Žamila Kolonomos and Vera Vesković-Vangeli
- Original title: Евреите во Македонија во Втората светска војна (1941–1945)
- Language: Macedonian
- Subject: The Holocaust
- Publisher: Macedonian Academy of Sciences and Arts
- Publication date: 1986
- Publication place: Socialist Republic of Macedonia

The Jews in Macedonia During the Second World War (1941–1945) is a collection of archival documents concerning the fate of the Macedonian Jews in the years 1941–1945, co-edited by Žamila Kolonomos and Vera Vesković-Vangeli and published in 1986.

== Historical context and background ==
The Jewish communities of present-day North Macedonia were almost annihilated in the Holocaust. In April 1941, the Bulgarian army in alliance with Nazi Germany occupied Vardar Macedonia and the new authorities quickly implemented increasingly painful anti-Semitic measures. On 11 March 1943, the Bulgarian authorities rounded up most of the local Jews and handed them over to the Germans, who transported them to the Treblinka extermination camp. They were gassed on arrival, and none are known to have survived. This had a devastating impact on the Jewish communities. From an estimated antebellum population of almost 8,000 Macedonian Jews, only a few hundred survived the war.

Further on, a combination of circumstances determined little awareness about the fate of those people. None of those sent to Treblinka are known to have survived to tell the story. After the war, Vardar Macedonia became again part of Yugoslavia, in its new iteration as the Communist Yugoslavia. The official line was of avoiding delving into the crimes of World War II, as they were considered to be capable of potentially destabilizing the internal inter-ethnic Yugoslav relations. This was to some extent relaxed in the Macedonian case, as the perpetrators were German and Bulgarian occupiers. Nevertheless, the mentioning of the fate of the Macedonian Jews was minimal.

Aleksandar Matkovski was the only historian involved in researching the topic of the Holocaust of the Jews in Macedonia. In 1958, he published a lengthy article entitled The Tragedy of the Jews from Macedonia, and enlarged in a book in 1962. For several decades it was the only documented source with significant global circulation about the fate of the Macedonian Jews under Bulgarian occupation in World War II. It came to be known to the majority of scholars worldwide who dealt with the Holocaust in the Balkans.

In 1982, Matkovski published an extended version of the 1962 book, titled A History of the Jews in Macedonia, which contained an update of his 1962 book in the form of a chapter on The Deportation and Liquidation of the Jews of Macedonia. He made use of Yugoslav, as well as Bulgarian archival material available in Yugoslavia and described in detail the political, diplomatic and legal preparation of the deportation by Bulgarian authorities and their German allies, the personnel and the organization of the concentration camp for Jews in the "Monopol" Tobacco Factory in Skopje and the three transports by Bulgarian State Railway to Treblinka. The documents constitute the blueprint of the 1986 book The Jews in Macedonia During the Second World War (1941–1945) co-edited by Žamila Kolonomos and Vera Vesković-Vangeli and published by the Macedonian Academy of Sciences and Arts.

== Content ==
The two-volume book has an in-depth introduction and 732 documents, mostly from Macedonian and other Yugoslav archives, as well as document copies from Bulgarian, German and other European archives in the possession of Yugoslav archives. The same as for Aleksandar Matkovski, the editors did not have direct access to archives in neighboring Bulgaria. After the war, the Bulgarian authorities sought to promote the narrative of the "rescue" of the Bulgarian Jews from the "Old Kingdom", while avoiding the facts of the extermination in the occupied Vardar Macedonia, Western Thrace and the Pirot region.

The documents are translated into Macedonian. There are document summaries in English and the introduction is also translated in English. Besides those from the 1982 book of Aleksandar Matkovski, there are many other documents gathered by the editors. Several Jewish testimonies before the Yugoslav Federal Commission for the Investigation of War crimes were published in full length for the first time. The archival records of the Skopje Jewish municipality, then housed at the Belgrade Jewish Museum, shed light on the ambivalent role the Central Consistory of the Bulgarian Jews had played in conveying anti-Jewish state demands to Macedonia's Jews. The dissemination of leaflets by the Partisan movement and the Communist Party came as reminders of inter-ethnic solidarity. Nonetheless, some documents also suggested that not all of the citizens of Macedonia had shown unwavering support for the plight of the Jews. The chosen materials featured mostly those pro-Bulgarian Macedonians who had been repeatedly stigmatized in Macedonian public history as traitors to the Macedonian cause. However, their publication contrasted with the elusive strategy adopted by Vardar Macedonian authors until that point.

Finally, the collection comprises a list of deportees based upon the German documentation compiled at the Skopje detention camp. It contains the personal data of 7,148 Jews from Vardar Macedonia, as well as from Preševo, Momchilgrad, and Vranje in Bulgarian-occupied former Serbia who were deported via Skopje to Treblinka. The lists contain first names, patronyms and surnames, exact addresses and birth dates, as well as information on gender, kinship relations, profession and citizenship. The lists have been compiled by Bulgarian and German authorities in the "Monopol" temporary concentration camp in Skopje in March 1943 and were handed over to the administration of the Treblinka extermination camp once the transports from Macedonia had arrived there.

== Relevance ==
Although the book was compiled with the intent to remain a collection of documents, its extent and the profound introductory study made it one of the most important works about the topic of the Holocaust of the Macedonian Jews. It had an important role in its introduction in the mainstream of history studies, almost with no other existing example in the Yugoslav historical science of the time. Based primarily on Bulgarian documents, the book represents the history of the Holocaust as seen through the eyes of those who had perpetrated it, a typical attitude of scientists who had survived the war, and of the early period of the Holocaust research.

== See also ==
- The Jews from Macedonia and the Holocaust (2010–2011 project)
