= History of the Jews in North Macedonia =

The location of North Macedonia (dark green) in Europe

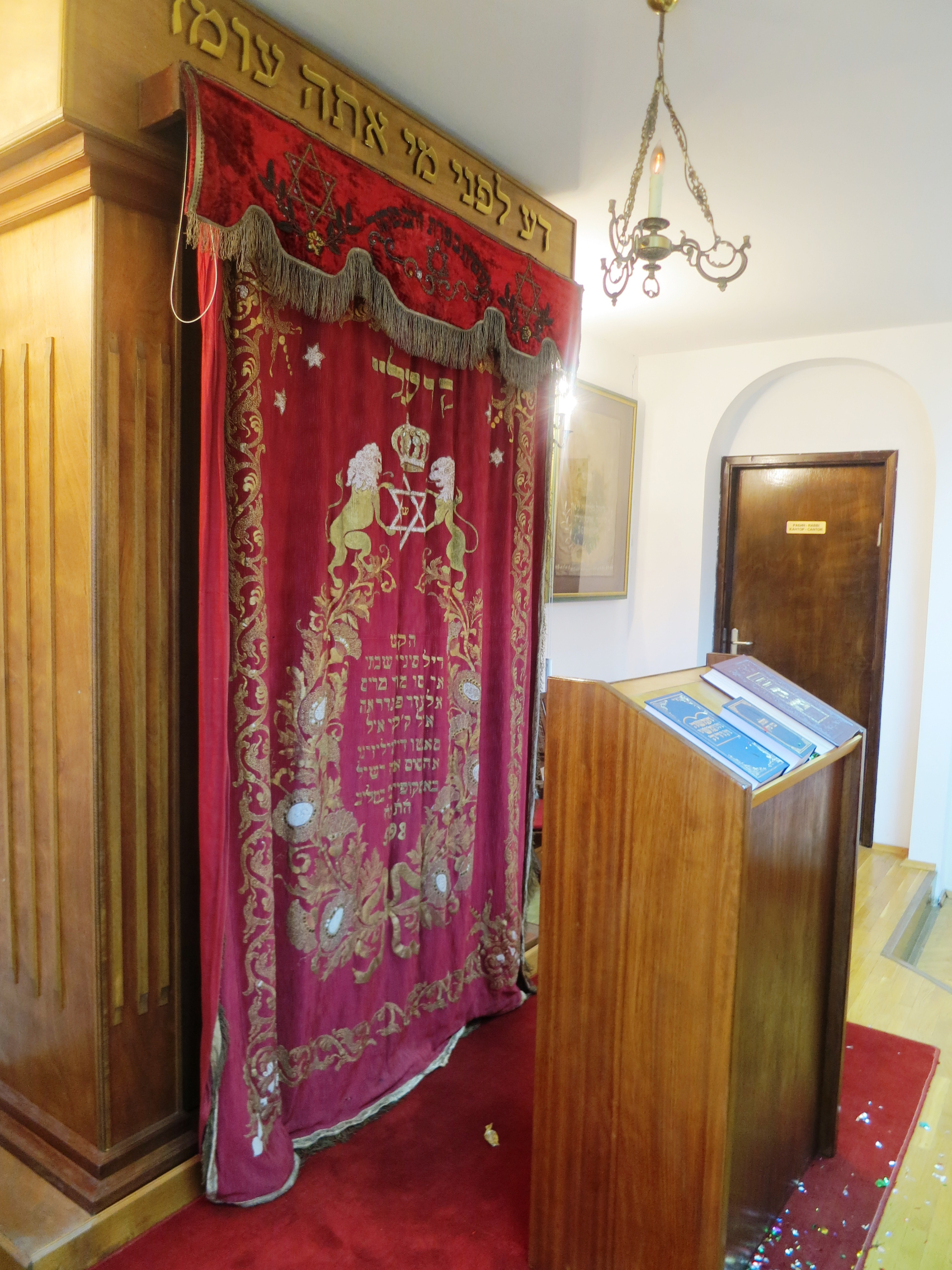
The Torah Ark of the Bet Jakov synagogue in Skopje, North Macedonia

The history of the Jews in North Macedonia stretches back two thousand years, beginning during Roman antiquity, when Jews first arrived in the region. Today, following the Holocaust and emigration, especially to Israel, 66 Jews remain in North Macedonia, mostly in the capital, Skopje and a few in Štip and Bitola.

== Ancient Roman times ==
The first Jews arrived in the area now known as North Macedonia during Roman times, when Jews fled persecution in other Roman territories, with some settling in the Roman territory of Macedonia. The presence of Jews in North Macedonia is attested by Agrippa's letter to Caligula.

At Stobi, in 165 AD, Tiberius Polycharmus, who is designated "father of the synagogue", converted his villa into a synagogue containing a prayer hall, a triclinium (dining hall) and a portico, reserving the upper story of the complex for his residence and that of his successors. The information comes from a very impressive and informative inscription, arguably the most important one found to date in a Diaspora synagogue.

The remnants of a Jewish synagogue excavated in Stobi (North Macedonia) date back to that period and the conclusion that a developed Jewish Community existed in that locality those days is based on these findings.

== Medieval times ==
The Jewish community persisted in North Macedonia (as well as in the rest of the Macedonian region) after Roman rule. The medieval Jewish population of North Macedonia consisted until the 14th-15th century primarily of Romaniote Jews. The First Crusade devastated the Jewish population in Pelagonia and Skopje. However, the Jews in North Macedonia continued to have prominent members of their communities. For instance, Leo II Mung, the Philosopher, converted to Christianity and succeeded Theophylactus of Ohrid as the archbishop of Ohrid from 1108 to 1120. A leading Jewish scholar, Judah Leon ben Moses Mosconi, born in Ohrid in 1328, wrote commentaries stating that incorrect interpretations of scripture often resulted from neglect of grammar. He later became the physician of the king of Majorca, where he assembled a vast library that was used by scholars for centuries to come. The first known synagogue in Skopje, Beth Aharon, was built in 1366.

== Ottoman Rule and Sephardic migrations ==
The area's Jewish community remained small well into Ottoman times, with the next major influx of Jews to the area coming with the Spanish and Portuguese Inquisitions, and Sultan Bayezid II of the Ottoman Empire welcomed Jews who were able to reach his territories. They were granted significant autonomy, with various rights including the right to buy real estate, to build synagogues and to conduct trade throughout the Ottoman Empire. Wealthy merchant cities in the present-day North Macedonia such as Skopje, Monastir (present-day Bitola) and Štip attracted many Jews. Jews in this area prospered in the fields of trade, banking, medicine, and law, with some even reaching positions of power. The Jewish cemetery in Bitola was established in 1497, soon after the first Sephardic Jews moved to the area. The cemetery is the oldest Jewish cemetery in North Macedonia, if not in the Balkans overall.

Relations between the Jews and the local non-Jewish population were generally good. Confirmation of good conditions for Jews in North Macedonia (and the broader Macedonian region) and Ottoman Europe in general comes from a 15th-century letter from the Macedonian Jew, Isaac Jarfati, sent to German and Hungarian Jews advising them of the favorable conditions in the Ottoman Empire, and encouraging them to immigrate to the Balkans. An Italian traveler wrote in 1560 that in Skopje Jews exceeded other populations in number. In the 17th century, there were 3,000 Jews and two synagogues in Skopje, Beit Aron and Beit Yaacov. In 1680, Nathan of Gaza died and was buried in Skopje. His burial place was a pilgrimage site after his death, but it would not become a permanent pilgrimage site, since it was destroyed in World War II.

At one point, Bitola had nine synagogues, Skopje three and Štip had two.

Several notable Jewish philosophers are born or lived for a time in North Macedonia, including Samuel de Medina, Josef ben Lev, Shlomo Koen, Kirco Blazevski, Jaakov tam David Yahia, Ishaak ben Samuel Adrabi, Aharon ben Josef Sason, and Salamon.

Piccolomini's burning down of Skopje in 1689 and a massive fire in Bitola in 1863 significantly diminished the Jewish population in North Macedonia in the two largest Jewish centers. In 1689, the Jewish population of Skopje was 3,000 of the total 60,000 population.

The Jewish community was almost entirely Sephardic, and most spoke Ladino at home. 1895 the Alliance Israelite Universelle established a school in Bitola. More than 30% of Macedonian Jews spoke French at this time.

Jews also took part in the liberation movement against Ottoman rule. A great number of Macedonian Jews participated in the Ilinden-Preobrazhenie Uprising. One of the most notable participants was Rafael Moshe Kamhi who led one of the rebel groups. It was he who took part in the early activities of the movement under the nickname Skanderbeg (Skender-beg). He headed a unit in Debar during the uprising of 1903. Mentes Kolomonos, Santo Aroesti, the Muson brothers and Avram Nisan are other known participants in the uprising who collected weapons and provided rebels with money.,

Jews from modern-day North Macedonia got their citizen rights after the region became a part of Kingdom of Serbia.

== Distribution ==
Prior to World War II, the Jewish community of Vardar Macedonia (the area roughly corresponding to the borders of the present-day republic) was centered on Bitola (approximately 8,000 Jews), Skopje (approximately 3,000 Jews) and Štip (approximately 500 Jews). The Jewish communities during World War I in smaller areas, like Dojran and Strumica, that were close to the front line, were significantly affected by the fighting and fled the area. The partition of the region also adversely impacted the Jews in the smaller centers since it deprived them of free flow for most of their merchant activities to the largest Jewish trading center in the Balkans, Thessaloniki.

== World War II and the Holocaust ==
In March 1941, Bulgaria became an ally of the Axis Powers and in April 1941 the Bulgarian army entered Vardar Macedonia, in an effort to recover the region, which it saw as a natural part of its own national homeland.

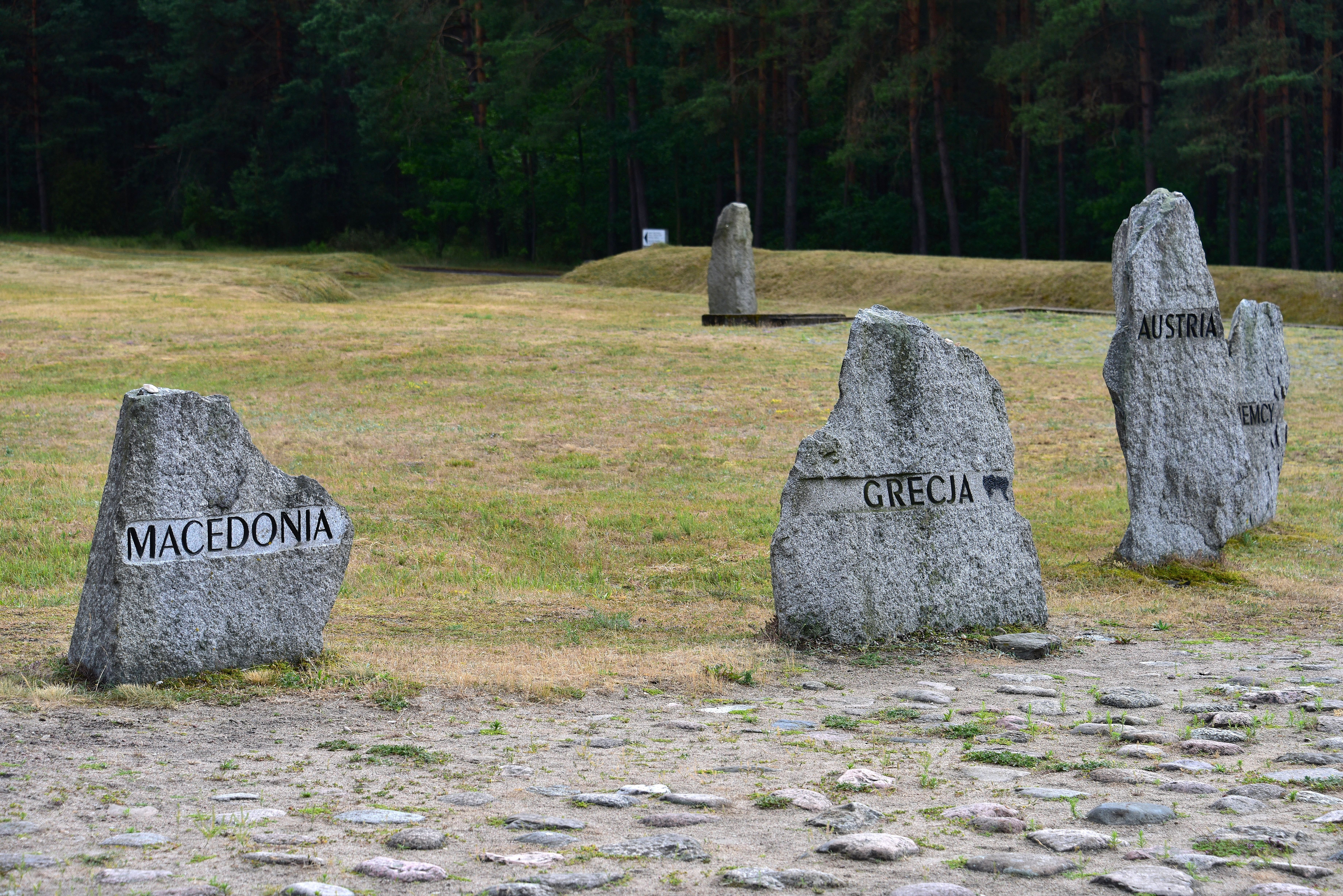
A stone commemorating Jews from North Macedonia on site of the former Treblinka extermination camp

Bulgarian authorities had already adopted an antisemitic law called "Law for Protection of the Nation" in January 1941. According to the U.S. Holocaust Museum, "on October 4, 1941, the Bulgarians enforced an extraordinary measure that prohibited the Jews of Macedonia from engaging in any type of industry or commerce." Over the course of 1942, they enacted increasingly harsh measures against the Jews under their control in Vardar Macedonia, as well as in occupied northern Greece. Some of the harsh demands by the Bulgarian government were that all "Jewish households hand over 20 percent of the value of all assets." The harsh measures culminated in 1943 with the deportation, upon orders from Germany, of "Macedonian Jews" and Greek Jewry to the Bulgarian border on the river Danube. From there they were transported with German boats and trains to the German death camp Treblinka in occupied Poland. Jews from Skopje, Stip, and Bitola, approximately a total of 7,215, were kept in "crowded, filthy conditions in four warehouses at Monopol" for 11 days before being put on trains to Treblinka.

Nazi Germany even requested that Bulgaria finance the deportations. On February 22, 1943, an agreement was signed between Theodor Dannecker, the special Nazi envoy sent to facilitate the deportations, and the Bulgarian Commissar for Jewish Affairs, Alexander Belev to deport 20,000 Jews (12,000 from Vardar Macedonia and Thrace and 8,000 from Bulgaria proper). This is the only agreement that a country ever signed with Nazi Germany for deportation of Jews. Bulgaria had to pay all transportation costs and promise never to claim those Jews as citizens.The Miraculous Rescue of the Bulgarian Jews during the Holocaust (1939 – 1945) (The Bulgarian Miracle) (Part 1) by Dr. Marcel Israel.

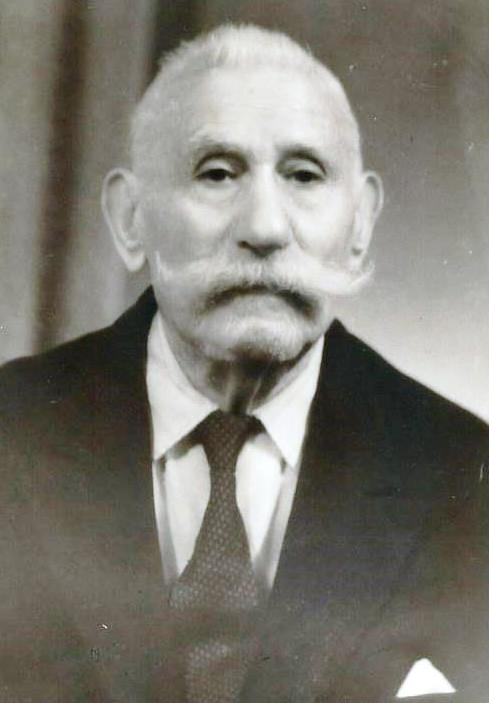
Rafael Moshe Kamhi was among the few survivors, after being saved by Bulgarian authorities. Among them were also Illés Spitz, Pepo Alaluf and others.

Many Jews joined the partisans fighting the Nazis in Yugoslavia. In Vardar Macedonia, Estreya Haim Ovadya, a Jewish woman from Bitola, was among the first women to join the partisan movement in 1941. The day before the deportations, the Central Committee of the Communist Party of Macedonia gave the Jewish community advance warning of the deportation. Shelters were organized, as well as connections to the partisan units, but unfortunately, few Jews believed that a program for their destruction was underway and chose to stay together in the ghettos instead. In contrast with the old Bulgarian territories, where widespread protests against the deportations took place, including petitions to the Sofia government, in Vardar Macedonia such organized movements were lacking. In the early morning of Thursday, March 11, 1943, Bulgarian police and army rounded up the entire Jewish population of Skopje, Bitola and Štip. The population was sent to a temporary detention center at "Monopol" the state tobacco warehouse in Skopje. Among 7,215 people who were detained in warehouses there were:

Further, the Jews were transported to the Bulgarian border with Romania on the river Danube, surrendering them to the Nazi German authorities and thus sending them to their deaths. As a result, the Jewish communities of Bulgarian-controlled Yugoslavia and Greece were almost completely wiped out. There was much harsh treatment before the Jews were transported in German cattle-cars to Treblinka. A few dozen Bitola Jews managed to avoid deportation, and four escaped from the transit camp. None of the 3,276 Jews of Bitola deported to Treblinka survived. In 2003, one Jew remained in the city that had been home to a Sephardic community for more than 400 years. Štip's ancient Jewish community was also completely destroyed.

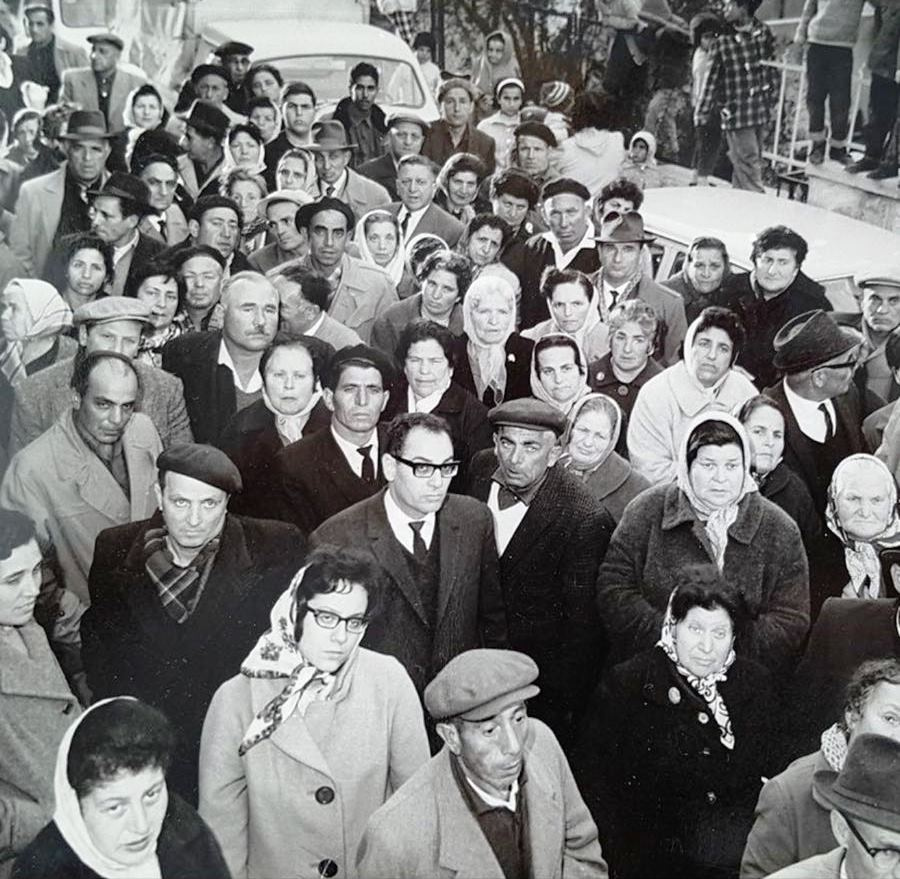
A crowd of Jewish immigrants gathered at the gates of the Yagel Yaakov Synagogue in Jerusalem, in preparation for a memorial service for the victims of the Monastir community who were murdered in the Holocaust (1967)

After World War II in Yugoslav Macedonia the total number of surviving Jews, according to Society of Jewish Communities in Yugoslavia, was 419. Some sources state that the remnants of the Jewish community re-gathered in Belgrade, Serbia and only about 140 had survived. Most had survived by going into hiding or fighting with the Yugoslav, Jewish partisans. Of those transported to the death camps, nobody survived. Most survivors chose to immigrate to Israel, with some returning to North Macedonia, and others remaining in Serbia. As a result of this the number of Jews living in North Macedonia dropped to 81 in 1952.

== Research and awareness of the Holocaust ==
A combination of circumstances determined little awareness in the decades after the war about the fate of the Macedonian Jews murdered in the Holocaust. Its impact almost annihilated the Macedonian Jews communities and only twelve of those sent to Treblinka are known to have survived to tell the story. After the defeat of the Axis, Vardar Macedonia became again part of Yugoslavia, in its new iteration as the Communist Yugoslavia. The official line was of avoiding delving into the crimes of World War II, as they were considered to be capable of potentially destabilizing the internal inter-ethnic Yugoslav relations. This was to some extent relaxed in the Macedonian case, as the perpetrators were German and Bulgarian occupiers. Nevertheless, the mentioning of the fate of the Macedonian Jews was minimal. Only in 1958, the historian Aleksandar Matkovski published The Tragedy of the Jews from Macedonia, in 1959 translated in English under the title The Destruction of Macedonian Jewry in 1943 in the yearbook of Yad Vashem, and enlarged in a brochure in 1962.

In 1967, Yugoslavia cut diplomatic ties with Israel, as it sided with the Arabs in the aftermath of the Six-Day War. This appears to have added another layer to the avoidance of researching the Holocaust. In the 1970s, the Yugoslavian authorities ordered the Macedonian historians to counter the increasing Bulgarian claims about the nonexistence of the Macedonian identity. The Institute of National History published several detailed studies on various aspects of the Bulgarian occupation of Vardar Macedonia in World War II, but the Holocaust and Bulgarian anti-Jewish measures were generally not covered.

In Bulgaria the post-war communist government increasingly focused the narrative on the rescue of the Bulgarian Jews, maintaining silence around the deportation and subsequent extermination of Jews in Vardar Macedonia, Western Thrace and the Pirot region in Serbia. In 1983, Matkovski broke the silence by publishing the first Macedonian language A History of the Jews in Macedonia. The chapter "The Deportation and Liquidation of the Jews of Macedonia" updates his previous 1962 book. It describes in detail the political, diplomatic and legal preparation of the deportation by the Bulgarian authorities and their German allies, the personnel and the organization of the concentration camp in the "Monopol" Tobacco Factory in Skopje and the three train transports to Treblinka. Four years later, in 1986, the editors Žamila Kolonomos and Vera Vesković-Vangeli published the collection of documents The Jews in Macedonia during the Second World War (1941-1945), translated in Macedonian. The book had an important role in the introduction of this topic in the mainstream of history studies.

The 2010–2011 project "The Jews from Macedonia and the Holocaust" sought to expand the scope of research and the spectrum of interdisciplinary angles around this topic and it materialized in a chrestomathy of fourteen original works and archival documents and also in an exhibition.

== Modern period ==
Presently, the Jewish community of North Macedonia numbers 66 people. Almost all live in Skopje, with one family in Štip and a single Jew remaining in Bitola.

The community opened in 2000 at the Beth Yaakov Synagogue, and has a community center in Skopje. The community also maintains ties with Jewish communities in Belgrade and Thessaloniki, while a rabbi travels to Skopje from Belgrade to aid in the conducting of services. The community also recently sent, for the first time, a representative to the annual bible quiz in Israel celebrated every year on Israel's independence day.

In January 2020, the government of North Macedonia appointed its first Jewish government cabinet minister, Labour and Social Policy Minister, Rasela Mizrahi, a member of VMRO-DPMNE. Immediately following this, she was the target of antisemitic comments, such as calls for her to prominently place the Star of David in her office. The Simon Wiesenthal Center responded that “antisemitic reactions have been revealing and outrageous." Within a month, she was fired from the Minister post for standing in front of a sign with the country's previous name (Macedonia). The charge to remove her was led by the Prime Minister Oliver Spasovski from the Social Democratic Union of Macedonia. The majority of the antisemitic comments against Mizrahi were directed from supporters of this political party. Mizrahi stated these "anti-Semitic attacks were a surprise. People in Macedonia are not anti-Semitic."

=== Religious revival ===
Sephardic synagogue in Bitola, before World War II

The First Balkan Rabbinical Conference was also held there, organized by the Jewish Community in North Macedonia "Yeshiva Bet Midrash Sepharadi – Rabbi Shlomo Kassin, World Zionist Organization – Department for Religious Affairs in Diaspora – Jerusalem – Israel", led by Rabbi Yechiel Wasserman and by the Government of North Macedonia (a commission for relations with religious communities and groups).

For this event, about 25 rabbis from all over the world participated including the Chief Rabbis of Moscow, Croatia, Serbia, Romania, Strasbourg, Lyon, rabbis from France, Bulgaria, Israel and represents from WJC and Israeli high government members. Also Yeshiva Bet Midrash Sepharadi – Rabbi Ezra Kassin and other rabbis from yeshivas who are serving all around the world.

The president of the European Jewish Congress – Mr. Moshe Kantor also participated, as well as a Representative of the JDC, World Jewish Congress, European Jewish Fund and many others. The Conference was hosted, in part, by Gligor Tashkovich, Minister of Foreign Investment of the Republic of Macedonia and he also gave a luncheon address.

This project to train Rabbi Kozma, to serve in a community where the institution of rabbi didn't exist for 60 years, was supported by the Jewish community in North Macedonia, Yeshiva – Rabbinical College Bet Midrash Sepharadi in Jerusalem – Israel and the World Zionist Organization – Department for Religious Affairs in Diaspora – Jerusalem – Israel. From 2000 Rabbi Avi M. Kozma served as an assistant Rabbi and Chazzan to the Chief Rabbi of Serbia Isak Asiel who was also serving Macedonian Jewish Community. Rabbi Avi M. Kozma was appointed in this conference (2008) as the first young Macedonian Jewish orthodox Sephardic rabbi born after the Holocaust to serve as a Chief Rabbi of the country.

== The Holocaust Museum in Skopje ==
A museum dedicated to the memory of North Macedonia's Jews who perished in the Holocaust during the Bulgarian rule was inaugurated in the presence of the country's president and representatives of North Macedonia's religious communities and international Jewish organizations in 2011. The modern building is located in the heart of what was once the city's Jewish quarter (Macedonian: Еврејско маало), in the center of the Macedonian capital Skopje. North Macedonia's Jewish community benefited from a 2002 law providing for the return of heirless Jewish property to the Jewish community, a law that is widely recognized as one of the best in Europe. North Macedonia was widely hailed for enabling the Jews to regain their heirloom that was lost in the Holocaust. The museum opened in March 2011, with transferring the urns containing the ashes of Macedonian Jews executed in Treblinka from the Museum of the City of Skopje to the Holocaust Museum. The museum was the first one to be opened in a museum complex that includes the Archeological Museum of Macedonia and the Museum of Macedonian Independence. Major landmarks and tourist attractions, such as the Stone Bridge, Skopje Fortress and the Old Turkish Bazaar are located around the museum.

Macedonian President Gjorge Ivanov recalled the long history of co-habitation between Jews and Macedonians and said that with the loss of the Jews "a part of [the Republic of] Macedonia had been torn out and that on the Jewish streets of Skopje, Bitola and Štip, after the war there was silence." Representatives of the Orthodox, Catholic and Muslim communities joined their Jewish countrymen in the inauguration of the museum. The museum details the history of North Macedonia's Jewish community since ancient times.

World Jewish Congress (WJC) Research Director Laurence Weinbaum pointed out that no Jewish community in Europe had suffered a greater degree of destruction than the one from North Macedonia.

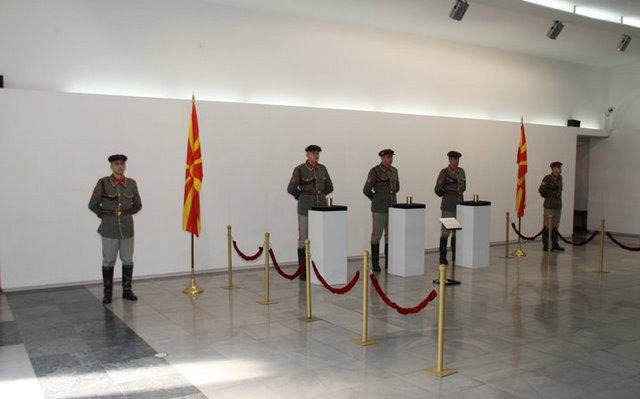
Transferring the urns containing ashes of North Macedonia's Jews executed in Treblinka

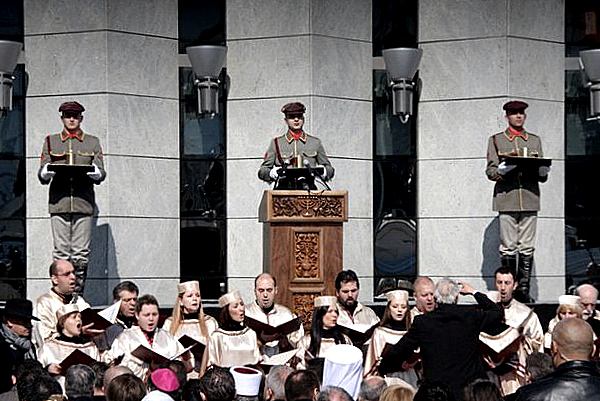
Inter-religious inauguration ceremony of the urns containing ashes of North Macedonia's Jews executed in Treblinka as part of the opening of the new Holocaust Museum in Skopje, North Macedonia

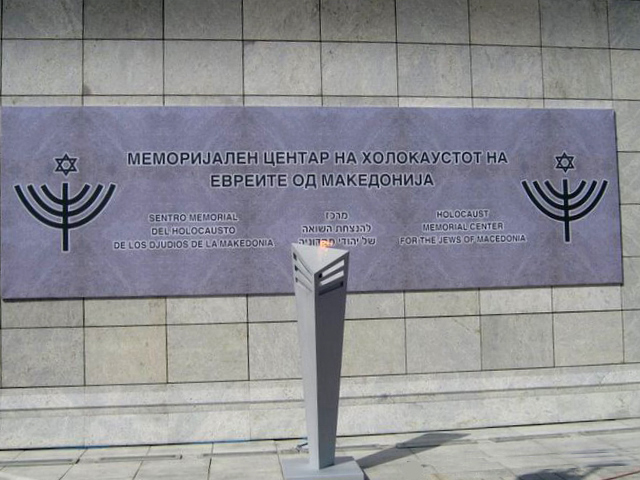
The sign of the Holocaust Museum in Skopje, North Macedonia in Macedonian, Ladino, Hebrew and English
