= Estreya Haim Ovadya =

Jewish partisan (1922–1944)

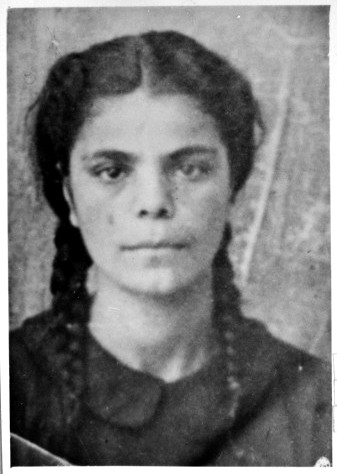
- Born: 25 December 1922; Bitola, Kingdom of Yugoslavia
- Died: 26 August 1944 (aged 21); Kajmakčalan, Bulgarian occupation zone of Yugoslavia
- Other name: Mara (nom de guerre)
- Military career
- Allegiance: Yugoslav Partisans
- Service years: 1943–44
- Units: 3rd Macedonian Brigade; 7th Macedonian Brigade
- Awards: Order of the People's Hero

Estreya Haim Ovadya (Serbo-Croatian: Естреја Хаим Овадија; 25 December 1922 – 26 August 1944) was a Jewish partisan from Bitola who participated in the anti-fascist resistance after the Axis invasion of Yugoslavia in 1941 during World War II. She was posthumously proclaimed People's Hero of Yugoslavia.

== Life ==
Estreya Ovadya was born in Bitola, Kingdom of Yugoslavia (now in North Macedonia) on 25 December 1922 to a very poor Jewish family. She became a member of Women's International Zionist Organization (WIZO), which supported the education of impoverished Jewish girls like her. She was sent to study in Belgrade in 1938 by Bitola's branch of WIZO due to Julia Batino's connections with the city's Jewish community. Ovadya joined the Workers' Movement faction of the League of Socialist Youth of Yugoslavia and was active in its women's sections.

After the bombing of Belgrade that began the invasion of Yugoslavia by the Axis powers on 6 April 1941, she returned to Bitola where she was forced into a Nazi Jewish ghetto due to antisemitic legislation imposed by the new Bulgarian authorities. In May 1941, she became involved in preparations for the anti-fascist resistance. She organized groups of Jewish women in the ghetto to discuss women's rights. Ovadya formally became a member of the Communist Party of Yugoslavia in 1942. During the deportation of the Jews from Bitola on 11 March 1943, Ovadya was hid by a member of the anti-fascist resistance Stojan Siljanovski, and escaped, along with other Jewish women, such as Adela Feradic, Stela Levi and Žamila Kolonomos. Along with the other Jewish women, she became a member of the Damjan Gruev partisan unit in April 1943.

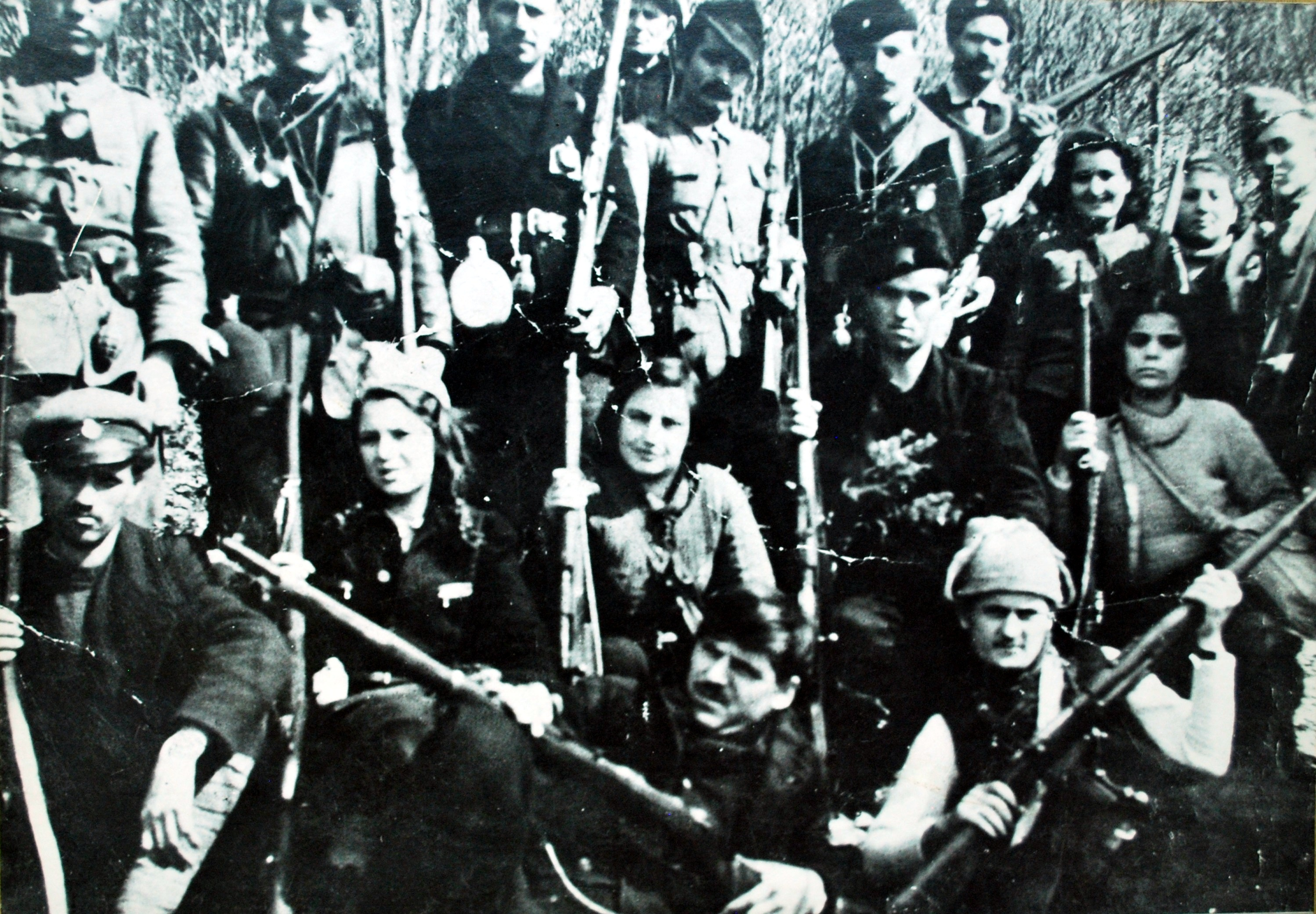
Fighters of the Bitola-Prespa partisan detachment "Dame Gruev" in Macedonia during World War II. Žamila Kolonomos (center) and Estreya Ovadia (right) between 1942 and 1944

The following month, she went into combat against the Axis forces with the new Goce Delcev partisan unit and then transferred to the Stiv Naumov Battalion when it was formed on 11 November. She fought under the nom de guerre Mara (Мара). When the battalion was integrated into the 3rd Macedonian Brigade, Ovadya was appointed as the political commissar of her squad. Her unit helped to organize the founding meeting of the Anti-fascist Assembly for the National Liberation of Macedonia on 2 August 1944, which proclaimed the Democratic Federal Macedonia.

Ovadya was appointed political commissar of a battalion in the newly formed 7th Macedonian Brigade on 21 August. She was killed in combat with Bulgarian Army border detachment, near the Kajmakčalan peak five days later. After the war, Ovadya was posthumously awarded the Order of the People's Hero on 9 October 1953 and Bitola built a monument in her honor. Ovadya was the only woman among 11 Jews proclaimed as such in Yugoslavia. She has been also commemorated in a folk song. A school was also named after her in the city. In 1978 historian Stojan Ristevski published a biography about her. The Jerusalem Municipality also named one of the streets in the Ramat Beit HaKerem neighborhood after her.

== Gallery ==
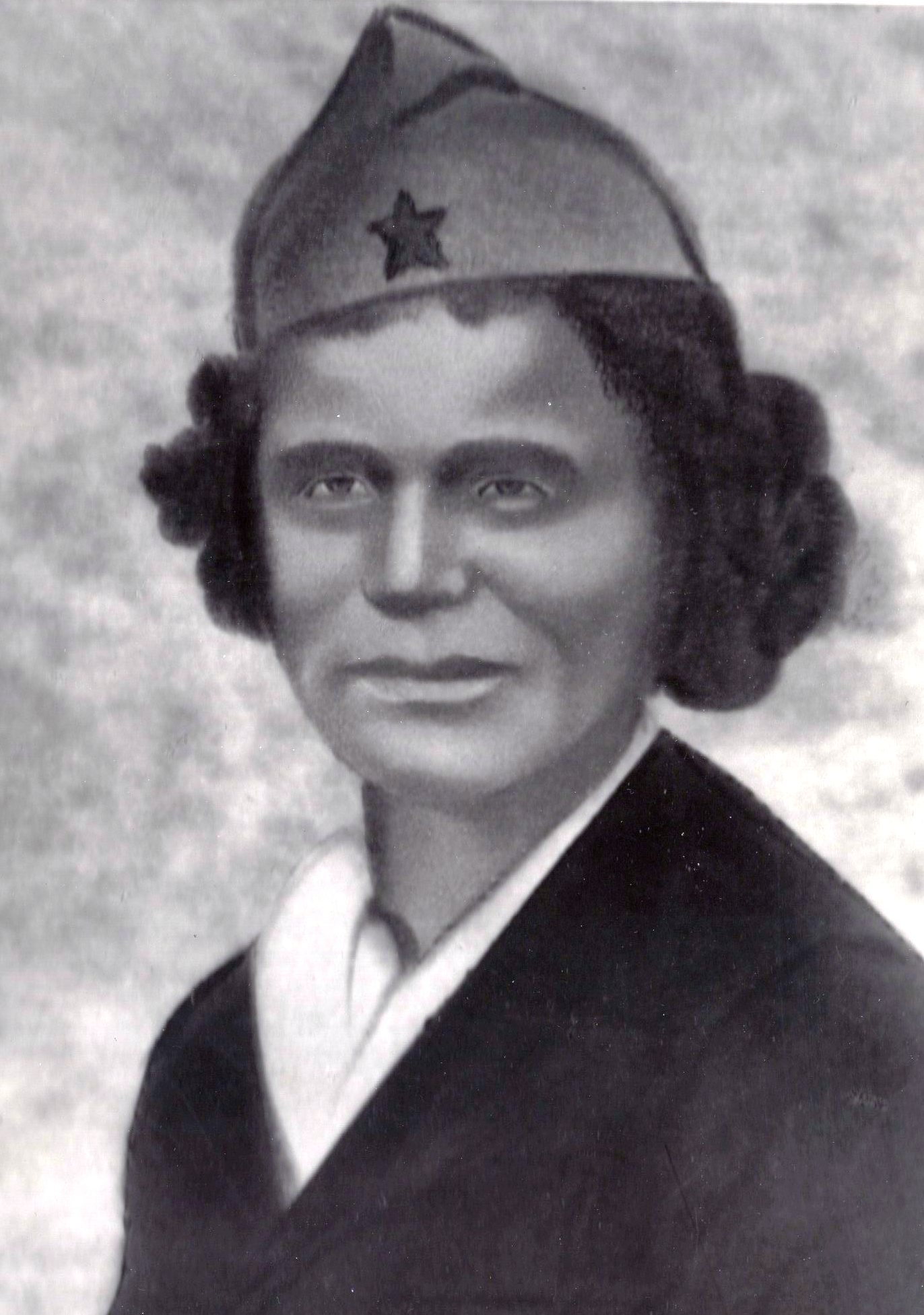
Drawing of Estreja

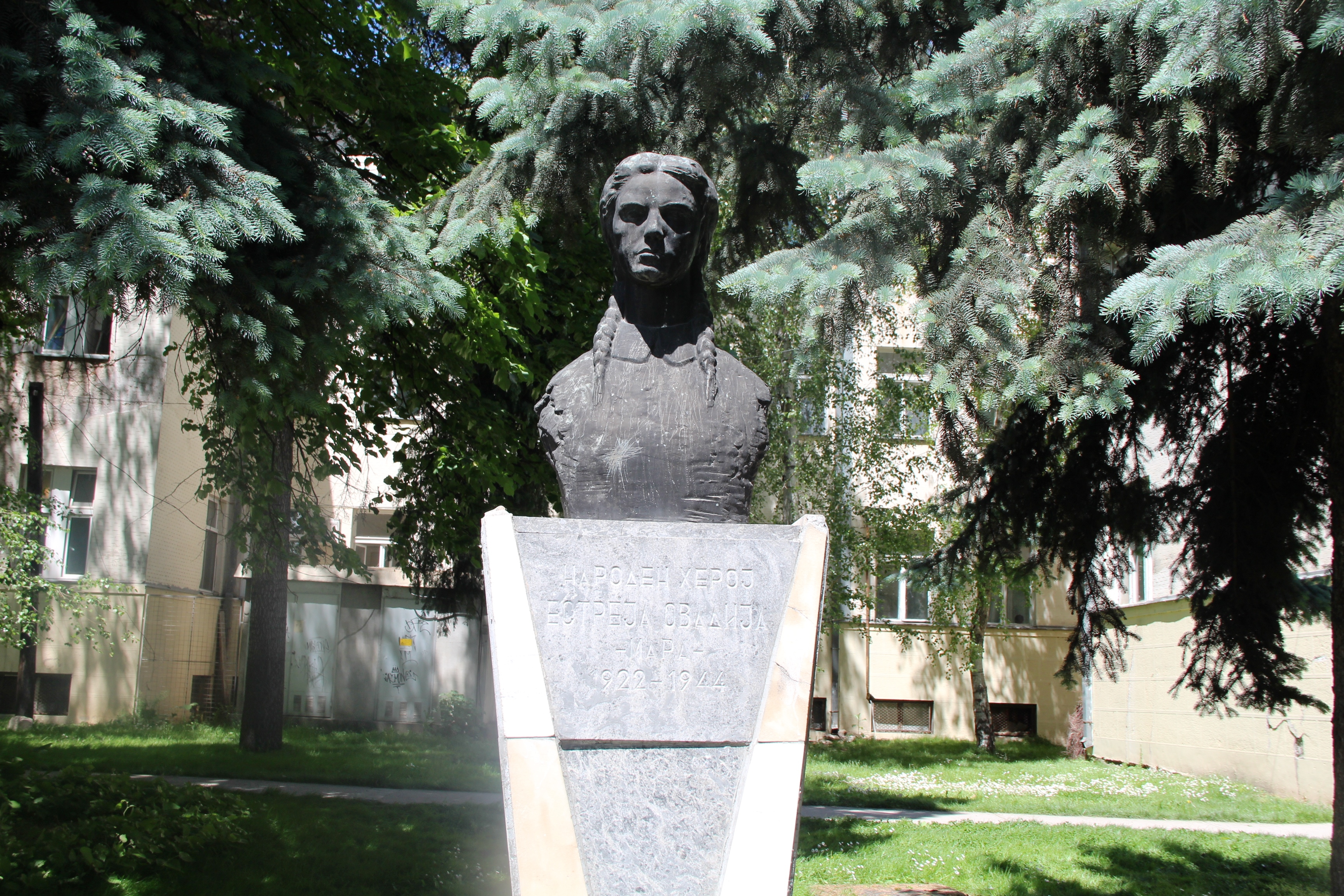
Estreya Ovadia's bust located where the Kal Di Aragon synagogue stood in Bitola

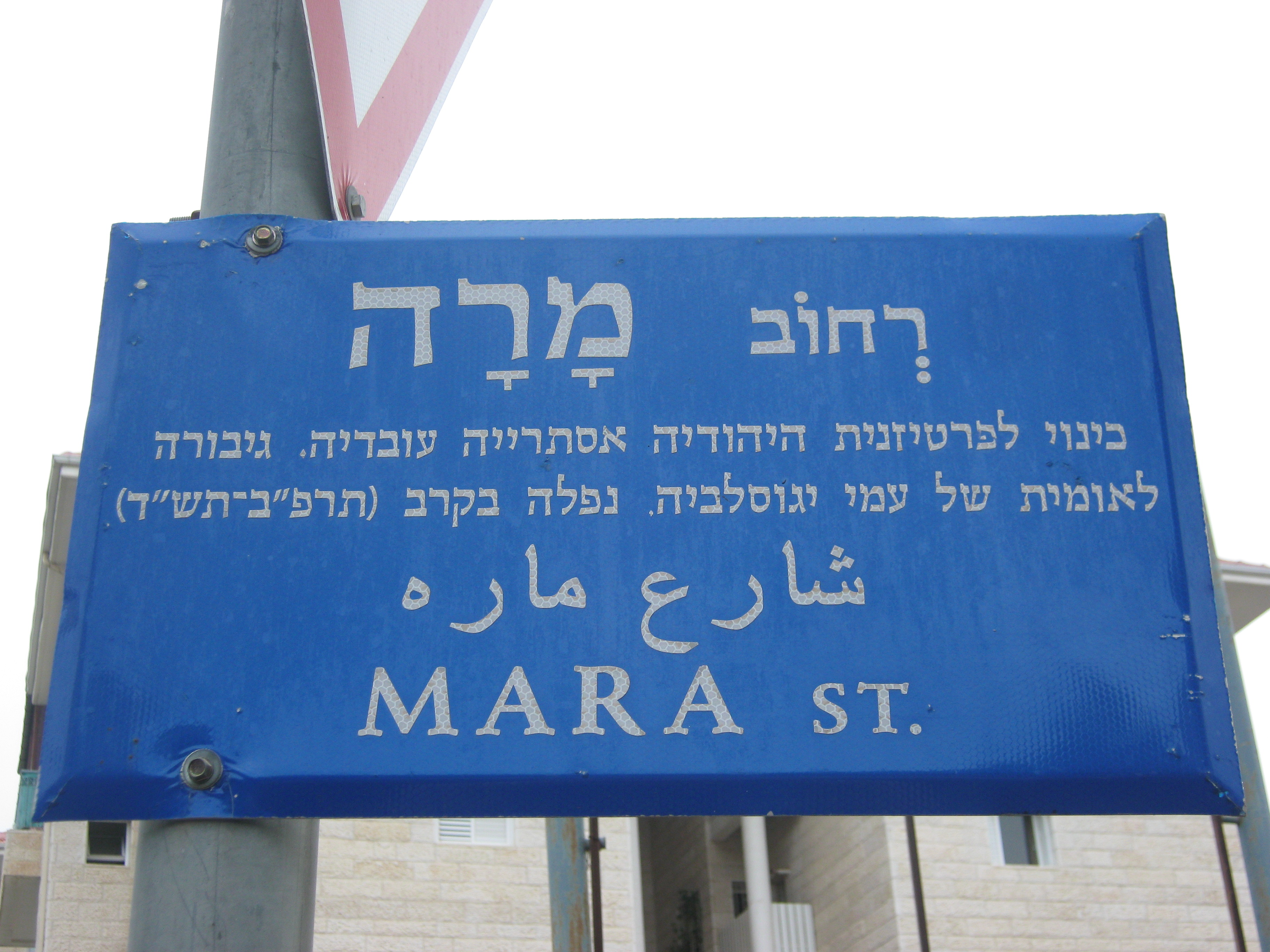
Mara Street for Estreya Ovadia at Jerusalem

== Bibliography ==
- Vesković-Vangeli, Vera (2005). "Ovadya, Haim Estreya". In Haan, Francisca de; Daskalova, Krassimira; Loutfi, Anna (eds.). Biographical Dictionary of Women's Movements and Feminisms in Central, Eastern, and South Eastern Europe: 19th and 20th Centuries. New York: Central European University Press. ISBN 978-963-7326-39-4.
- Cohen, Julia Philips; Stein, Sarah Abrevaya (2014). Sephardi Lives: A Documentary History, 1700–1950. Stanford University Press. ISBN 978-080-4791-91-5.
- Bataković, Dušan T. (2011). Minorities in the Balkans: state policy and interethnic relations (1804 - 2004): Les minorites dans les Balkans. Balkanološki institut SANU. ISBN 978-867-1790-68-0.
- Himka, John-Paul; Michlic, Joanna Beata (2013). Bringing the Dark Past to Light: The Reception of the Holocaust in Postcommunist Europe. University of Nebraska Press. ISBN 978-080-3225-44-2.
- Troebst, Stefan (2013). "Macedonian Historiography on the Holocaust in Macedonia under Bulgarian Occupation". Südosteuropäische Hefte. 2 (1).
- Alboher, Shlomo (2010). The Jews of Monastir Macedonia: The Life and Times of the Departed Jewish Community of Monastir. Holocaust Fund of the Jews from Macedonia. ISBN 978-608-6512-91-0.
- Zdravkovska, Žaneta (11 January 2021). "Улица во Ерусалим го носи името на битолчанката Естреја Овадија-Мара, еврејка прогласена за народен херој во Југославија". SDK.MK (in Macedonian).

== See also ==
- Fascism in Bulgaria
- World War II in Yugoslav Macedonia
