= Žamila Kolonomos =

Sephardi Jewish writer, academic, and activist (1922–2013)

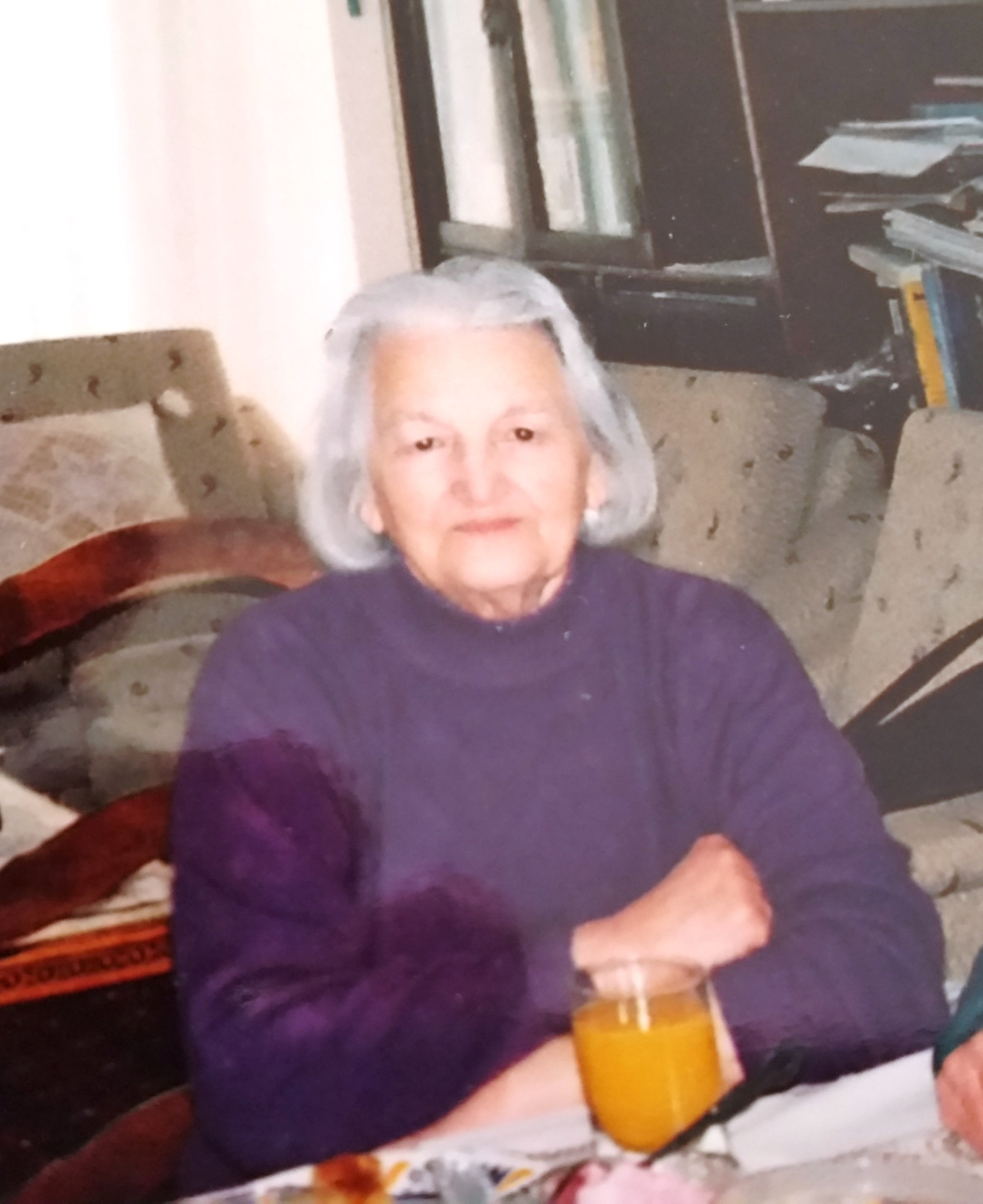
- Born: June 18, 1922; Monastir, Kingdom of Yugoslavia
- Died: June 18, 2013 (aged 91); Skopje, Macedonia
- Other name: Cveta (Note: Also rendered as Tsveta.) (nom de guerre)
- Occupations: Macedonian partisan, writer, academic, political activist
- Employer: Ss. Cyril and Methodius University of Skopje
- Organization: Hashomer Hatzair
- Political party: Communist Party of Yugoslavia; Communist Party of Macedonia
- Spouses: Čede Filipovski Dame (m. 1944; died 1945) Avram Sadikario (m. 1947; died 2007)
- Children: 2

Žamila Andžela Kolonomos (Note: Her first name has been also rendered as Zhamila, Jamila and Djamila.) (Macedonian: Жамила Ангела Колономос; June 18, 1922 – June 18, 2013) was a Sephardi Jewish partisan, writer, academic, and political activist in what is now North Macedonia.

During World War II in Vardar Macedonia, Kolonomos joined the Yugoslav communist resistance. After the war, she realised her entire family had been killed in an extermination camp. Later she became a professor at the Ss. Cyril and Methodius University of Skopje and worked to preserve the identity of the country's Jewish community. Through her scholarly publications and memoirs, she played a significant role in the shaping of the Holocaust's legacy in the country.

== Early life ==
Žamila Kolonomos was born on June 18, 1922, in Monastir (now Bitola, North Macedonia) to Jewish parents. She grew up in the Jewish community in the city, where her father was a manager in the local branch of Banque Franco-Serbe (French-Serbian Bank). Her parents, Isak and Esterina Fransez Kolonomos, had five children. Her father was descended from Romaniote Jews from Ioannina in present-day Greece. The Kolonomos family had likely resided in the area during Roman and later Byzantine rule. In the early twentieth century, three brothers from the family settled in Monastir, home to an active Sephardi community. Her family was a prominent banking and trading family. The Kolonomos family was not very religious, although they celebrated the Jewish holidays. Living in a multicultural region, the family spoke Ladino, Greek, French, Serbian, and Turkish.

In her teens, Kolonomos studied at the French school in Bitola, beginning in 1940. She was a member of the Socialist-Zionist youth organization Hashomer Hatzair (The Young Guard).

== World War II ==
In 1941, the Axis powers occupied Vardar Macedonia, including Monastir. After their occupation of Monastir on April 9, 1941, the German authorities prohibited the activities of Hashomer Hatzair and other youth movements. The Bulgarian authorities implemented the Law for Protection of the Nation and other anti-Jewish regulations in the same month. At the age of 19, shortly after the occupation began, Kolonomos joined the Yugoslav communist resistance to the Axis occupation. Her father also encouraged her to join the partisans, who saw it as a way for her to protect herself; her mother had died earlier that year of a heart disease. She participated in the League of Communist Youth of Yugoslavia, where three groups came under her responsibility.

She had already been involved in anti-fascist efforts through Hashomer Hatzair, making shoes for resistors and collecting weapons. She helped found underground resistance groups for women and youths. In April 1942, she became a member of the Communist Party of Yugoslavia.

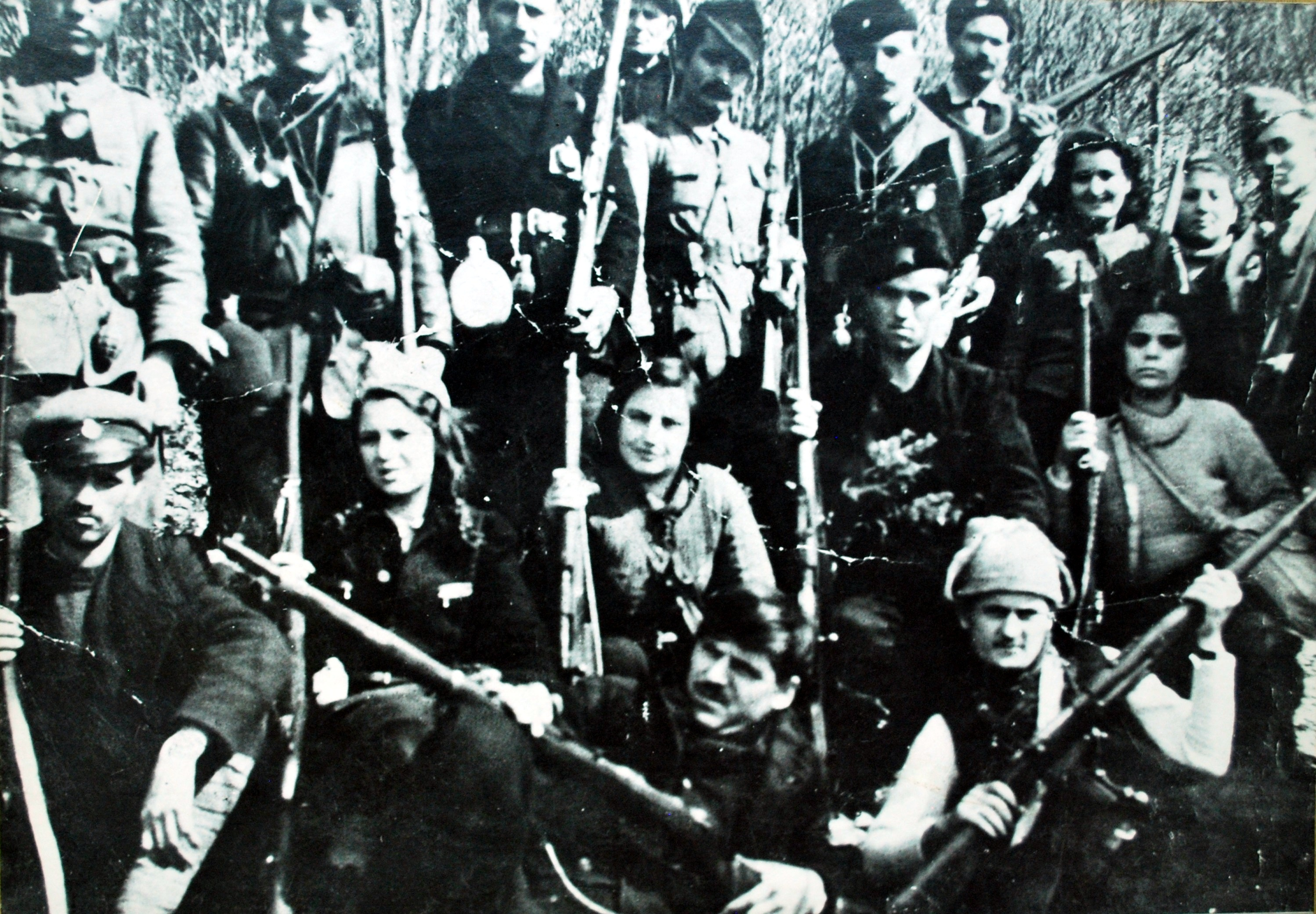
Žamila Kolonomos (center) with fighters of the Dame Gruev detachment in Macedonia during World War II.

As Monastir's Jews were rounded up and deported by the Bulgarian authorities on March 11, 1943, Kolonomos and several other Jewish resisters such as Estreya Ovadya, Adela Feradji, Stela Levi and Rosa Kamhi managed to escape by hiding in a cigarette kiosk, belonging to a member of the anti-fascist resistance - Stojan-Bogoja Siljanovski. She fled the city and joined the Dame Gruev detachment of the Macedonian Partisans in the following month. After joining the detachment, along with her fellow partisans, she fought against Bulgarian troops in villages. According to her, they also had many battles with Germans, Italians and Ballists. She also edited the detachment's newspaper. Monastir's Jewish community was nearly completely wiped out. Kolonomos lost 18 members of her family, including her father, grandparents, and siblings, who were sent to the Treblinka extermination camp. She was the only member of her immediate and extended family to survive the Holocaust.

Fighting under the nom de guerre Cveta, she eventually rose to the rank of commissar for several battalions, then became the deputy commissar of the First Macedonian Brigade and the 42nd Yugoslav Division. After nearly dying of starvation in the winter of 1943–1944, Kolonomos was hit by an exploding shell and wounded in the back during the battle for Debar the following August. She survived, and Vardar Macedonia was fully liberated in November 1944.

== Postwar period ==
After the liberation of Macedonia, she married fellow partisan Čede Filipovski Dame, who had saved her life on several occasions, in December 1944. He died in a motorcycle accident in June 1945; Kolonomos gave birth to their daughter, Mira, a month later.

She moved to the capital, Skopje, in late 1945, after having learned of the deaths of her family members. There, she married another fellow partisan Avram Sadikario, who had also survived the occupation of Bitola, in June 1947. The couple had a son, Samuel, and were married until his death in 2007. However, tragedy struck again in 1963 when Kolonomos lost her 18-year-old daughter, Mira, in the Skopje earthquake.

In the years after the war, she received several national medals in recognition for her wartime service in the resistance, including the Commemorative Medal of the Partisans of 1941. She continued to be involved in political activism, including through the Alliance of Yugoslav Resistance, the Union for the Protection of Childhood of Macedonia, and the Alliance of Anti-Fascist Women of Macedonia. She served as president of the Union of Women's Associations, the War Veterans' Union, and various other groups. Kolonomos also became a member of the Central Committee of the Communist Party of Macedonia in 1948. In 1956, she traveled to China in a delegation to represent Yugoslavia, meeting with Mao Zedong. Kolonomos served as a deputy in the National Assembly of the Socialist Republic of Macedonia, and as a member of the Council of the Republic of Macedonia until her retirement.

== Academic career and death ==
Kolonomos received a doctorate in Ladino from Ss. Cyril and Methodius University of Skopje in 1961, and she became Professor Emeritus of the Faculty of Philosophy in the department of Romance philology there in 1962. She also studied at the Sorbonne in this period.

She wrote and edited various articles and books on the region's history, Ladino, and the Yugoslav-Macedonian resistance during World War II. This notably includes The Jews in Macedonia during the Second World War (1941–1945), originally published in 1986 in Macedonian, co-written with Vera Veskoviḱ-Vangeli.

In the 1970s, she published two collections on Sephardi Jewish language, culture, and history: Poslovice i izreke sefardskih Jevreja Bosne i Hercegovine (Proverbs and Sayings of the Sephardi Jews of Bosnia and Herzegovina), about Bosnia and Herzegovina, and Poslovice, izreke i priče sefardskih Jevreja Makedonije (Proverbs, Sayings and Tales of the Sephardi Jews of Macedonia), about Macedonia. Animal tales (including five from Skoplje and two from Monastir) are present in the latter work. She was the only Macedonian Sephardic collector of linguistic and cultural heritage of Macedonian Jews in this period.

Her 2006 memoir Monastir sin Djudios was published in English translation as Monastir Without Jews: Recollections of a Jewish Partisan in Macedonia in 2008. Subsequently, her 2007 memoir of the resistance Dviženjeto na otporot i Evreite od Makedonija was translated into English in 2013 under the title The Resistance Movement and the Jews From Macedonia. Her books were frequently published in Ladino as well as Macedonian.

Žamila Kolonomos died in Skopje on June 18, 2013, at the age of 91. Her work represents some of the only firsthand accounts of Jewish life and the Holocaust in what is now North Macedonia. A collection of her photographs, documents, medals, and other objects is held by the United States Holocaust Memorial Museum.

== Selected works and honours ==
Kolonomos produced the following works and received the following honours:

- Poslovice i izreke sefardskih Jevreja Bosne i Hercegovine (Proverbs and Sayings of the Sephardi Jews of Bosnia and Herzegovina), 1976
- Poslovice, izreke i priče sefardskih Jevreja Makedonije (Proverbs, Sayings and Tales of the Sephardi Jews of Macedonia), 1978
- Evreite vo Makedonija vo Vtorata svetska vojna, 1941–1945 (The Jews in Macedonia During the Second World War (1941–1945)), co-edited with Vera Veskoviḱ-Vangeli, 1986
- Sefardski odglasi: Studii i sekavanyaza evreite od Makedoniya (Sephardic Echoes: Studies and Memories about the Jews from Macedonia), 1995
- Monastir sin Djudios (Monastir without Jews), 2006
- Dviženjeto na otporot i Evreite od Makedonija (The Resistance Movement and the Jews From Macedonia), 2007
- (Socialist Federal Republic of Yugoslavia) Order of Bravery (1947)
- (Socialist Federal Republic of Yugoslavia) Order of the Partisan Star (1952)
- (Socialist Federal Republic of Yugoslavia) Order of Brotherhood and Unity (1950)
- (Socialist Federal Republic of Yugoslavia) Order of Merits for the People (1975)
