= Battle of Štip =

Battle of Štip (1689)
- Part of the Great Turkish War; Karposh's rebellion
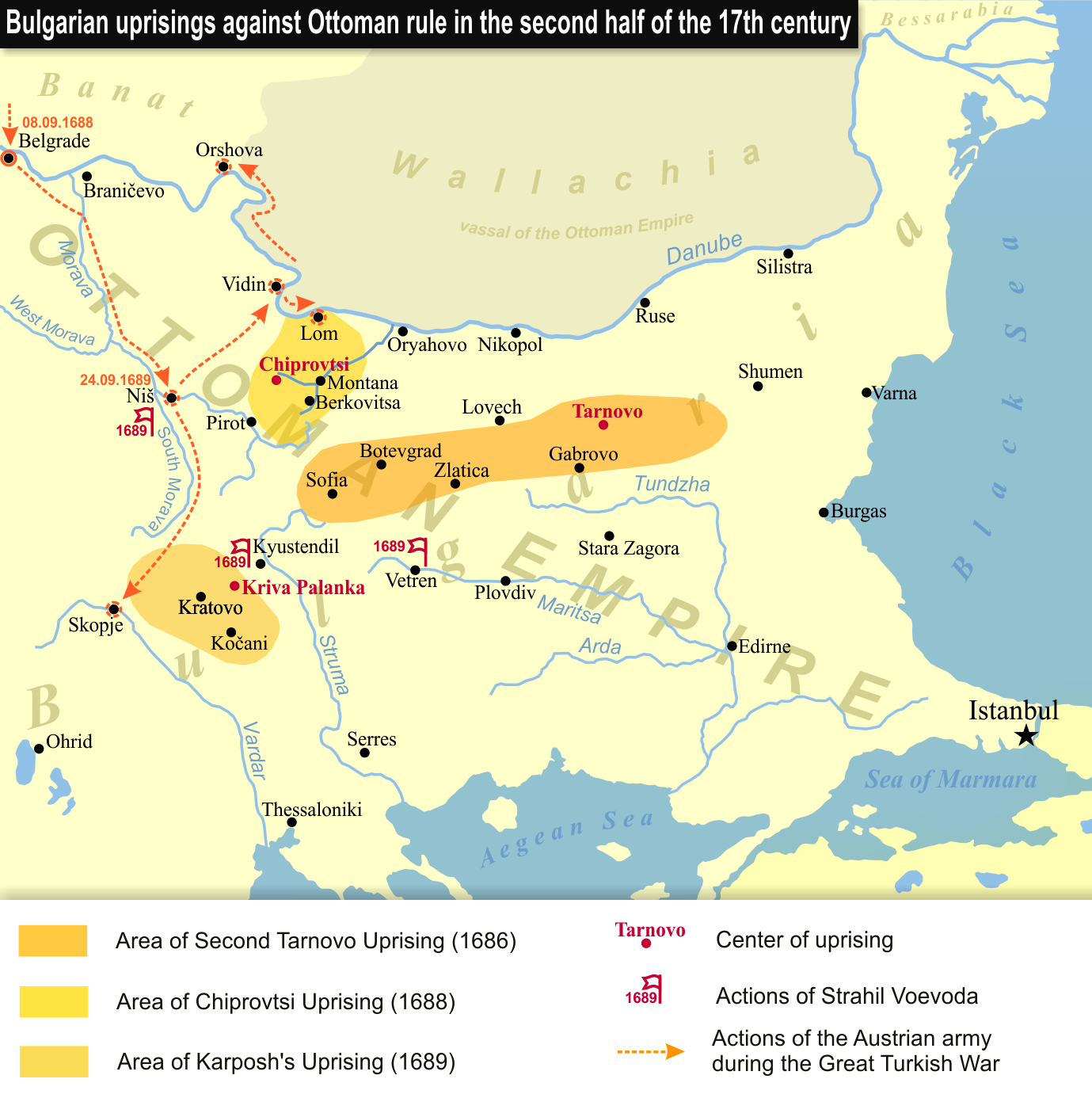
- Karposh's rebellion
Date	November 10, 1689
Location	Štip (now North Macedonia)
Result	Habsburg victory

Belligerents
Habsburg Monarchy	Ottoman Empire

Commanders and leaders
Johann Georg von Holstein	Unknown

Strength
Unknown	6,000

Casualties and losses
Unknown	2,000

The Battle of Štip was a clash between the forces of the Habsburg Monarchy and Ottomans during the Austrian counteroffensive of the Great Turkish War on November 10, 1689. The battle ended in victory for the Austrians, the Ottomans suffered heavy losses of about 2,000 dead, and were forced to retreat.

== Background ==
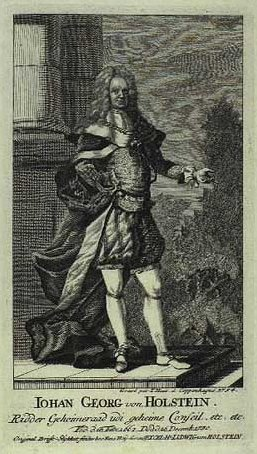
Johann Georg von Holstein

After setting Skopje on fire, the Austrians continued to make breakthroughs deep into Macedonia, whose task was to observe the area in order to prevent and disrupt the concentration of enemy forces. One such breakthrough was made by Prince Johann George von Holstein, who took command of Enea Silvio Piccolomini's troops after he died of cholera.

== Battle ==
Learning that the Turkish army had concentrated in Štip, he decided to smash it and drive it out of the city with a swift attack. Leaving their camp near the Kumanovo village of Orizari, Johan Georg von Holstein's Austrian troops arrived in Štip at dawn on November 10, 1689. This was the fiercest and largest clash between the Austrian and Ottoman armies on Macedonian territory. The battle ended in a convincing victory for the Habsburg monarchy.

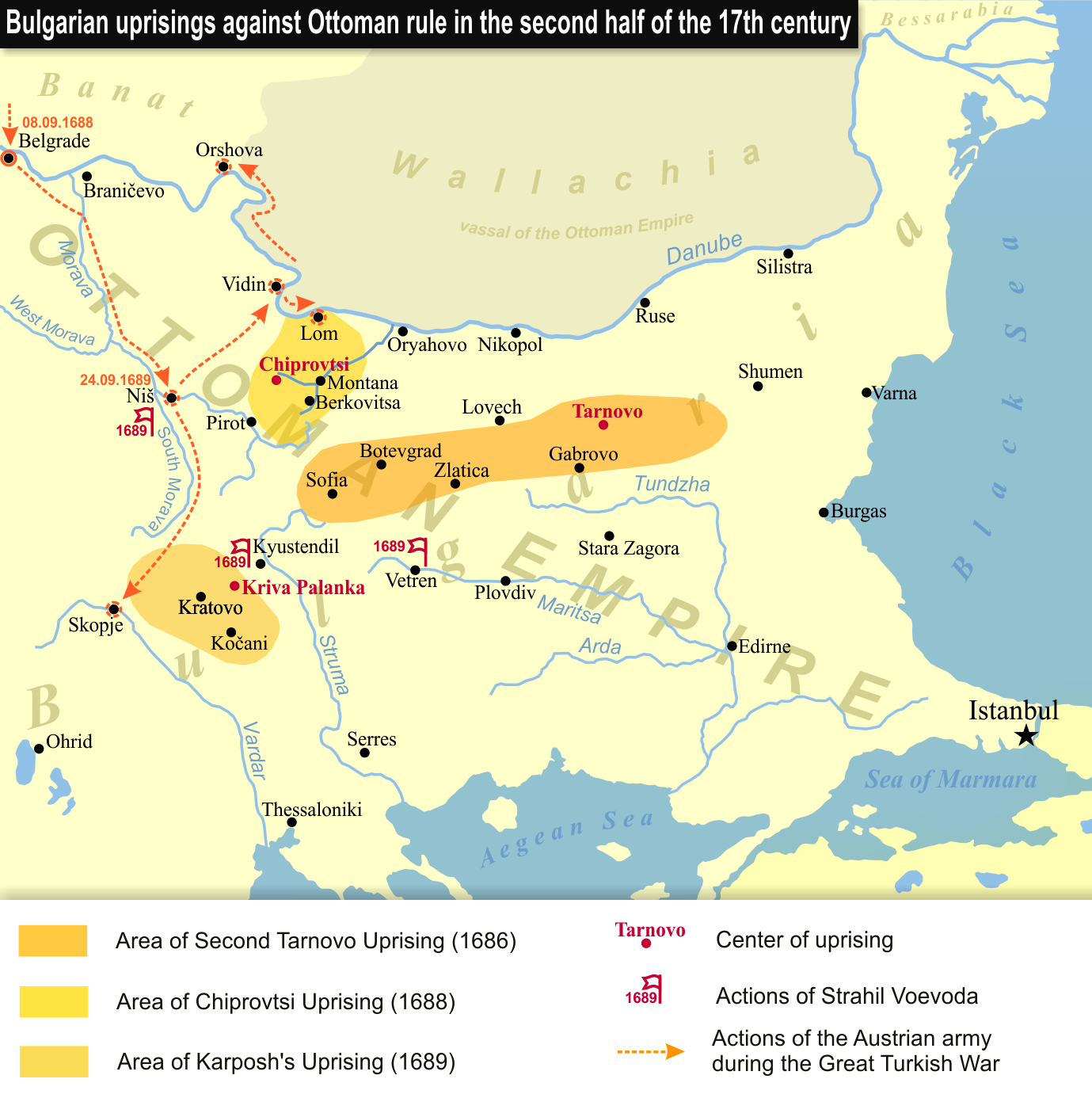
Map of the Karposh's rebellion

The Ottomans were completely smashed. Leaving behind some 2,000 dead, they were forced to retreat. The Austrians set the city on fire and returned to Kosovo, carrying a substantial cargo of several thousand barrels of goods. Returning, they smashed another Turkish reconnaissance unit of 300 men.

== Aftermath ==
After two years, in 1691, the city was reconquered by the Ottomans. The city suffered severe damage. Due to the destruction, Štip could not recover until the 19th century.

== See also ==
- Skopje fire of 1689
- Great Turkish War
- Enea Silvio Piccolomini

== Sources ==
- eprints.ugd.edu.mk
- History of the city – Municipality of Stip
- Municipality of Stip, STIP - TOURIST INFORMANT, With map of the city. Stip: Municipality of Stip, 2011, p. 1. 7.
