= Mehmet Bey Mosque =

Former mosque in Serres, Central Macedonia, Greece

- Τέμενος Μεχμέτ Μπέη
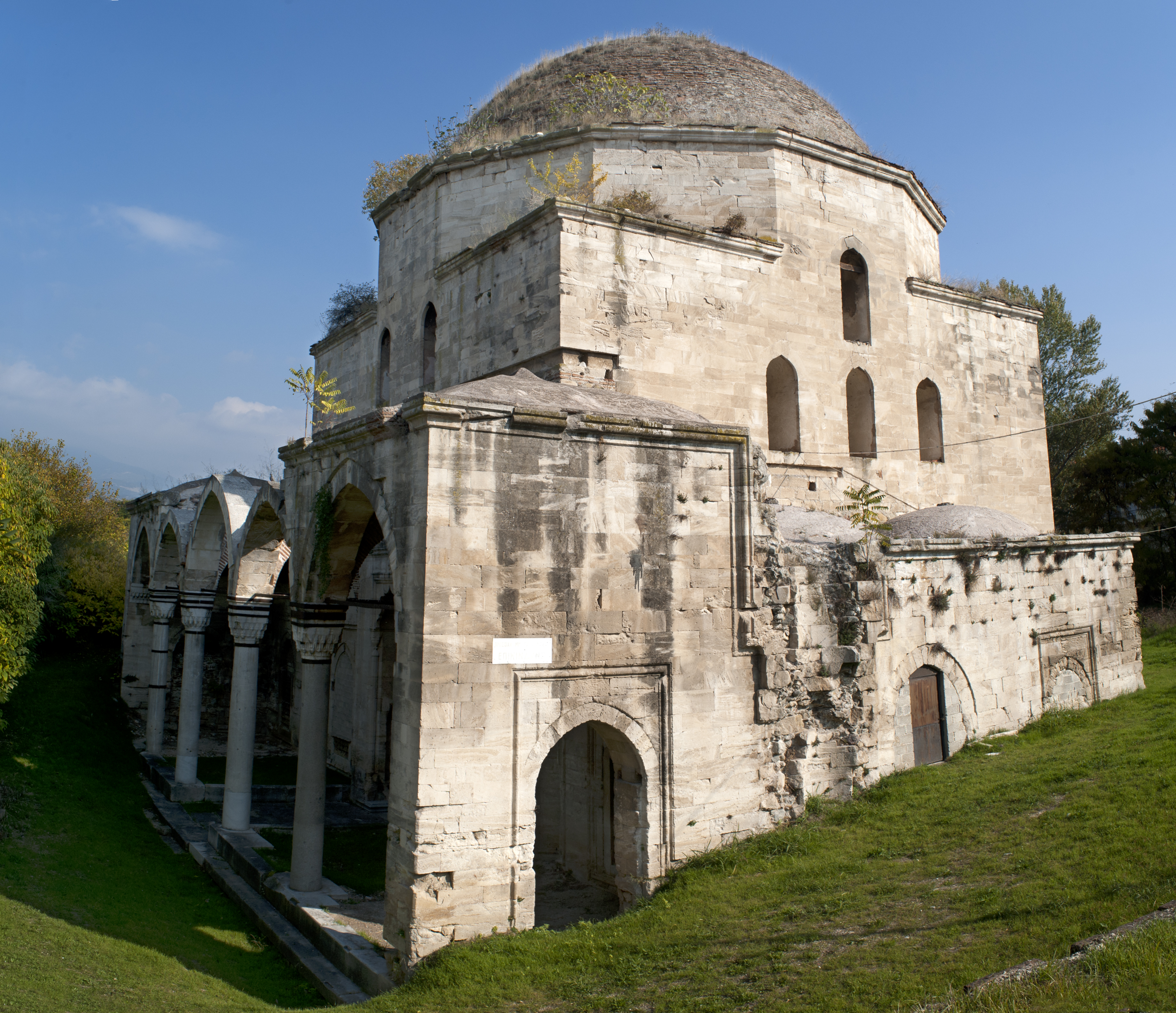
- The former mosque in 2011

- Location of the former mosque in Greece

Religion
- Affiliation: Islam (former)
- Ecclesiastical or organisational status: Mosque (1493–19th century)
- Status: Abandoned (as a mosque); Partially preserved

Location
- Location: Serres, Central Macedonia
- Country: Greece
- Interactive map of Mehmet Bey Mosque
- Coordinates: 41°05′29″N 23°33′34″E

Architecture
- Type: Mosque
- Style: Ottoman
- Founder: Mehmet Bey
- Completed: c. 1493

Specifications
- Dome: 1
- Dome height (outer): 14.58 m (47.8 ft)
- Materials: Limestone ashlar; bricks; marble; lead

The Mehmet Bey Mosque (Greek: Τέμενος Μεχμέτ Μπέη, Turkish: Mehmet Bey Camii), locally also known as Hagia Sophia (Greek: Αγιά Σοφιά), is a former mosque in the city of Serres in northern Greece. Built in c. 1493 during the Ottoman era, the mosque was abandoned in the late 19th century.

== History ==
The mosque was built by the eponymous Mehmet Bey in 1492-1493. Mehmet was a son-in-law of Sultan Bayezid II, having married the princess Seldjuk Hatun. The couple lived in the city in the late 15th century and endowed it with several other buildings, none of which survive.

Despite being the oldest and largest of the city's surviving mosques, today the building is derelict and unused. It had ceased to function as a mosque sometime in the late 19th century, when it suffered extensive damage from the flooding of the nearby Agioi Anargyroi stream.

== Architecture ==
The mosque is built of carefully carved yellow limestone ashlar masonry, except for the domed parts, which are built of brick. It consists of a spacious square central prayer hall, topped by a single dome with a diameter of 14.58 metres (47.8 ft). Four smaller rooms covered by half-domes are arranged two each on the east and west sides of the central space, while the southern face features a pentagonal portico containing the mihrab. The main entrance is located on the northern wall, topped by the founder's dedicatory inscription and fronted by a portico comprising five arches supported by columns of white marble with exquisitely carved capitals. The central arch is topped by a semi-spherical dome, while the arches on either side are topped by funnel domes. Originally, all the domes of the mosque were roofed in lead, and the interior walls plastered, while travellers report that a beautiful garden surrounded the building.

The mosque was famed for its architecture and the beauty of its garden. The Ottoman chronicler Evliya Çelebi noted that:

All of the structures, the domes, the madrasah, the school and the soup kitchen are all covered in lead. It is almost impossible to describe how light and spiritually refreshing this mosque is. It would take many many words to truthfully describe the beauty of the handwork in the many areas of the mosque. The only other mosque that could compare to this one is the Yahya Paşa Mosque in Üsküp [Skopje]. But the gardens surrounding this mosque have no rival; they are as if covered in green velvet, with majestic trees and every possible type of bird flies around in this greenery. Thousands of the faithful can sit in the shade of the many trees and discuss things. The smell of the garden's many cypresses are intoxicating, and the mosque has become famous from Greece to Persia.

— Evliya Çelebi

== See also ==
- Islam in Greece
- List of former mosques in Greece
- Ottoman Greece
