= Bit Pazar shooting =

- Part of the prelude to the 2001 insurgency in Macedonia
- Date: 6 November 1992
- Location: Bit Pazar in Skopje, Macedonia

Parties
Macedonian Police	(Albania) Ethnic Albanian civilians

Casualties
- Deaths: 3 Albanian male civilians 1 Macedonian female civilian
- Injuries: 36 Albanian civilians wounded

Bit Pazar shooting or Bit Pazar incident took place on 6 November 1992. At the time, it was an event that weakened the stability of Macedonia and raised the possibility of an outbreak of armed conflict between ethnic Albanians and Macedonians in the country.

== Background ==
Following independence, relations between the Macedonian state and the ethnic Albanian minority were tense due to disagreements over sociopolitical rights. Amidst that situation, on 6 November 1992, action was undertaken by Macedonian police against smuggling operations within Bit Pazar, an open marketplace located in the capital city Skopje.

== Shooting ==
A series of accounts exist as to what took place on 6 November 1992. In one rendition, a teenager in Bit Pazar from an Albanian background that sold smuggled cigarettes tried to run away from police during a routine inspection and in the process, stumbled and yelled to say the police were physically attacking him. It generated a riot at Bit Pazar.

In another recollection, the teenager was taken by police to a hospital and that he was either treated badly or killed resulting in a group of 2000 people in an angered state to assemble and attempt to enter the medical facility. Later, police dressed in riot gear arrived with a support van to stabilise the location. Shots were fired from afternoon until nighttime and protestors were armed with guns and grenades.

According to the other versions of the event, the police arrested several Albanians during an operation in Bit Pazar with the news media reporting that a young Albanian male, from the village of Ljuboten, was beaten to death at a police station. A group of people angered by the incident later assembled, declared the innocence of the men and demonstrated against discrimination from the state. The protest risked breaking out into violence and fueled concerns that armed conflict might occur. In the ensuing confrontation due to the incident, police shot and killed 1 Macedonian female civilian and 3 Albanian male civilians. 36 people were injured.

== Aftermath ==
At the time it was said among Macedonian circles that those wounded or killed were from Albania and Kosovo and not citizens from Macedonia. In some parts of Skopje, buses were stoned, and in others, barricades made from tyres were erected. At the funerals for Albanians, there was large turnout that for a short time obstructed major roads.

British journalist Misha Glenny described most of Tetovo and Skopje after the incident as being in a state of "war psychosis". He reported that people kept away from city streets in the evening and both ethnic groups were preparing for the possibility of a larger conflict. According to him, ethnic Albanians and Macedonians credit Mitat Emini, then part of the Party for Democratic Prosperity (PDP) leadership and who had the trust of Macedonian leaders as preventing the situation from escalating out of control. Emini spoke for more than half an hour in Albanian and urged Albanians in the country to not go out onto the streets.

Macedonian-Albanian relations in the country were thrown into crisis due to the shooting. The event placed the spotlight on the real possibility of violent conflict in the state, similar to the ongoing war in Bosnia-Hercegovina. Among Macedonians, it sparked fears regarding the future and whether Albanians were loyal to the Macedonian state. The Macedonian Ministry of Internal Affairs, dominated at the time by former communist members with anti-Albanian sentiments, used the incident as a reason not to recruit Albanians into the security forces. Among Albanians, it sparked the fear that it signaled the beginning of police repression. After the killings, leading Albanian politicians questioned the possibility of sharing positions in the government with the Macedonian majority.

Some reactions among Macedonians involved othering such as describing Albanians as divjaci ("savages"), criminals, a threat to the state, overdemanding when it came to rights, with the shooting as the work of organised elements, in reference to criminality and Albanian ethnicity. The shooting had the effect among Macedonians of transposing an image of Albanians as different through their Albanian language and Muslim religion, being prone to criminality and violence. The incident also weakened attempts to portray the republic as a robust and secure country and to gain wider global recognition under its then constitutional name Republic of Macedonia. The incident was a prelude to the 2001 insurgency in Macedonia.
