= Sultan Murad Mosque =

Ottoman-era mosque in Skopje, North Macedonia

Sultan Murat Mosque Султан-муратовата џамија Xhamia e Sulltan Muratit Sultan Murat Camii
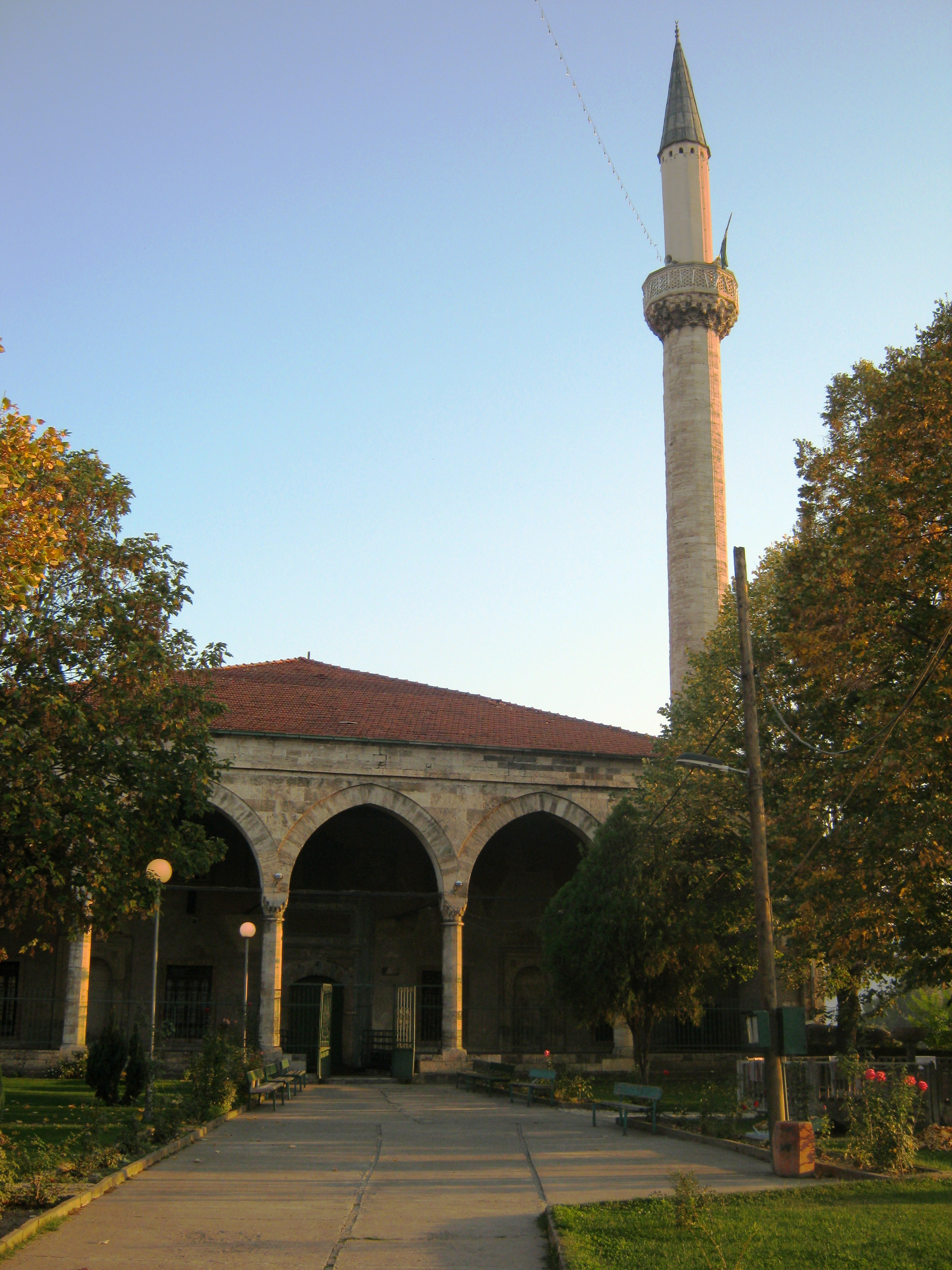

Religion
- Affiliation: Islam

Location
- Location: Skopje, North Macedonia
- Interactive map of Sultan Murat Mosque; Султан-муратовата џамија Xhamia e Sulltan Muratit; Sultan Murat Camii
- Coordinates: 42°0′7″N 21°26′7.5″E

Architecture
- Architect: Husein bey of Dibra
- Type: mosque
- Style: Early Constantinople Ottoman Architecture
- Completed: 1436; 590 years ago

Specifications
- Dome: 1
- Minaret: 1

The Sultan Murad Mosque (Macedonian: Султан-муратовата џамија; Albanian: Xhamia e Sulltan Muratit; Turkish: Sultan Murat Camii) is an Ottoman-era mosque in Skopje, North Macedonia. It was built in the 15th century on top of the Monastery of Saint George which was destroyed when Ottoman commander Pasha Yiğit Bey captured Skopje from Vuk Branković in 1392.

== History ==
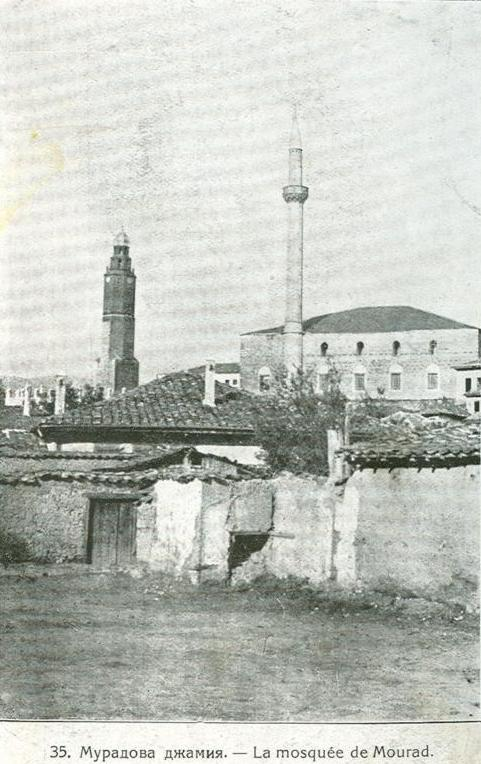

It was built with Sultan Murad's money donation. The mosque was built in 1436.

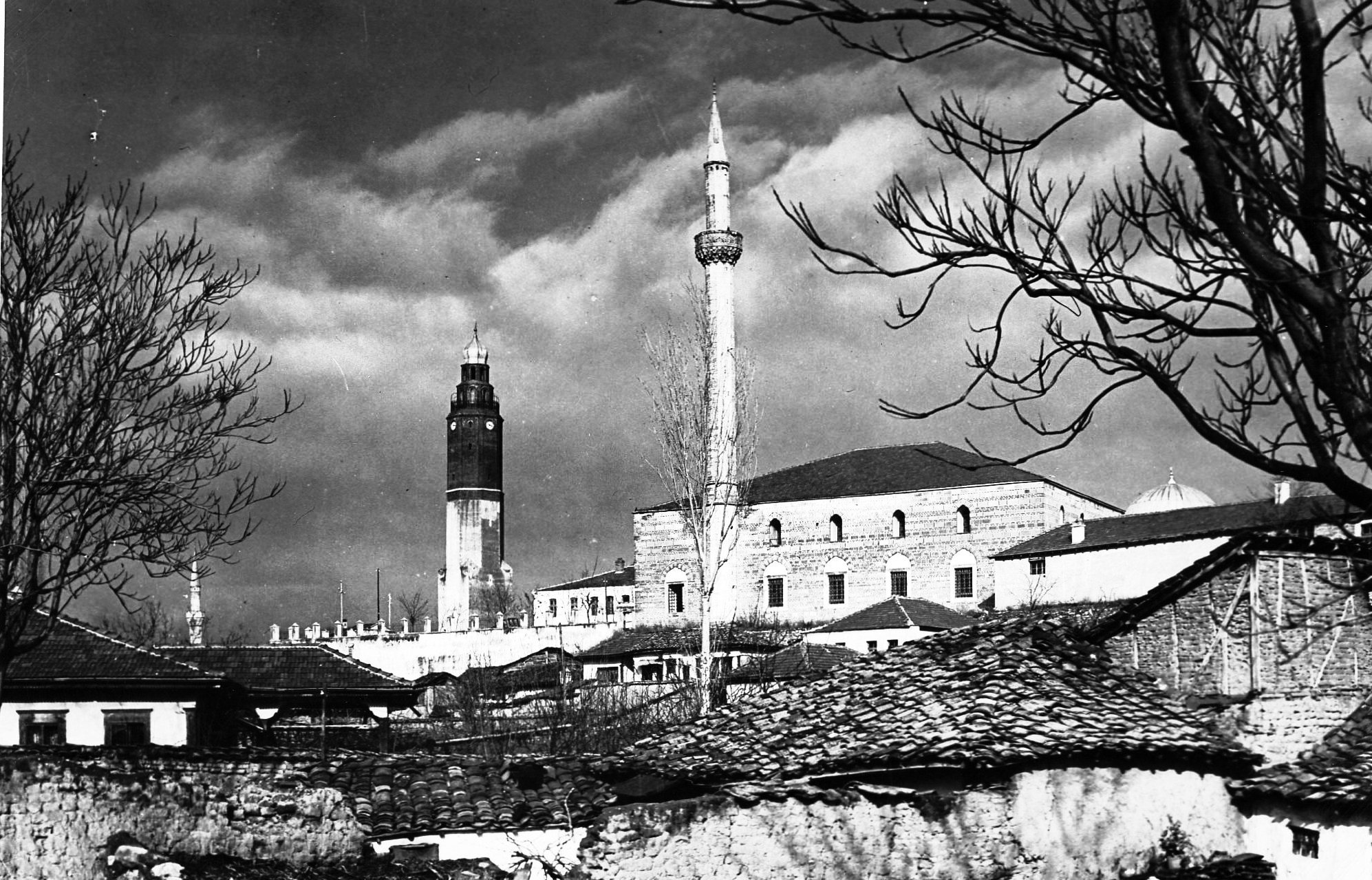
Postcard of Skopje, Sultan Murat Mosque and Clock Tower, 1939

The Sultan Murat Mosque complex, the only Sultan endowment in Skopje, stands on a low hill in the central part of Skopje's Old Bazaar. It was burnt down and heavily damaged a number of times during its existence, events and changes to which the three inscriptions above the entrance refer. The first time of the fire was 1537, after which it was reconstructed by Sultan Suleyman in 1539. The second time, it was burnt down by the Austrian armies led by their military leader Piccolomini, who set the whole city on fire. It was renewed after twenty three years in 1711 by decree of Ahmed III. The mosque underwent repair work for the last time in 1912, decreed by Mehmed V.

In terms of its architectural features, as one of the largest mosques in Skopje, it belongs among the most significant specimens of Ottoman building in the Balkans. It has a basilica architectural form and is covered with a four-ridged roof. This is similar to the Early Constantinople style in Ottoman architecture. The interior is partitioned into three naves with rows of three columns, while the ceiling is made of a flat wooden coffered ceiling. The mihrab, minber and mahvil date from the 1910s.

The Türbe of Ali Pasha of Dagestan stands next to the east facade of the Sultan Murad Mosque. It houses two stone sarcophagi, the burial site of Ali Pasha's wife and daughter. The Türbe of Bikiy Han stands on the south side of the mosque. In the interior, there are five tombs without inscriptions. With its grand monument, the Türbe of Bikiy Han is the largest among this type of edifices which survive in North Macedonia. There is a necropolis in the area surrounding the two türbe, with several grave markers.

Sultan Murad Mosque stands on a plateau next to the clock tower. The main architect of the mosque was Husein from Debar. The mosque has remained mostly undamaged through the fires and earthquakes Skopje has sustained.

The Sultan Murad Mosque is rectangular in shape, with a porch including four columns with decorated caplets, connected by arcades.
