= Kapan Han =

Caravanserai in the Old Bazaar of Skopje, North Macedonia

Coordinates: 42°00′03″N 21°26′12″E

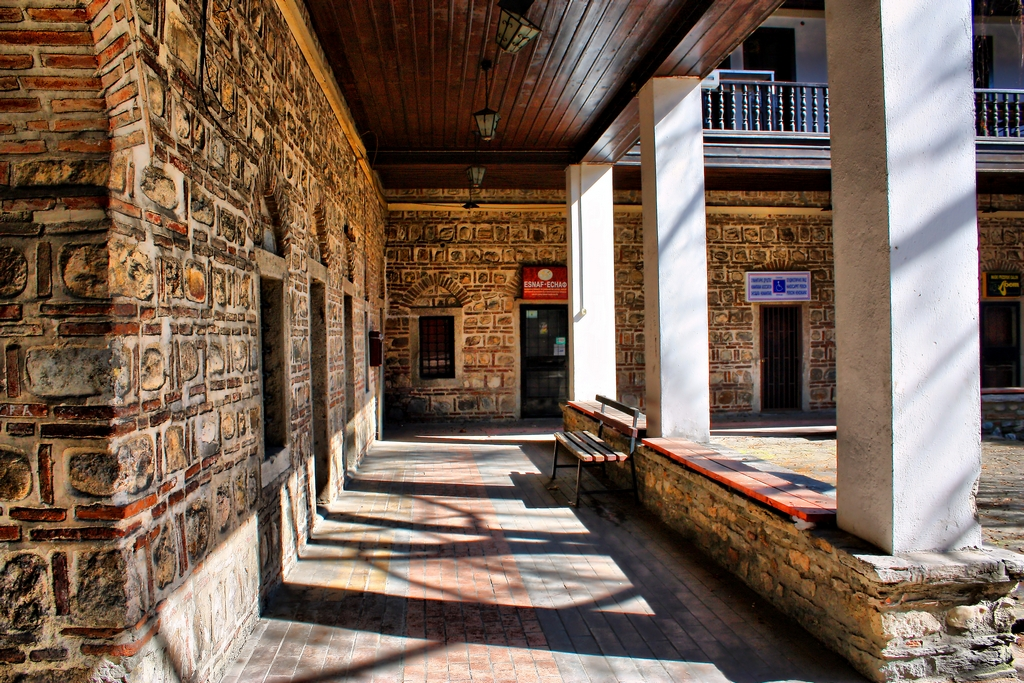
Kapan Han

Kapan Han (Macedonian: Капан ан, romanized: Kapan an, Albanian: Hani i Kapanit, Turkish: Kapan Han) is a han (caravanserai) in the Old Bazaar of Skopje, North Macedonia. It was built in the mid-15th century by Bosnian general Isa-Beg Isaković, ruler of Skopsko Krajište, in order to provide a regular source of income for his endowment (vakuf).

== Etymology ==
The name of the han is derived from the Arabic word kabban which was a device used for measuring the weight of sold goods at the entrance of the han.

== Characteristics ==
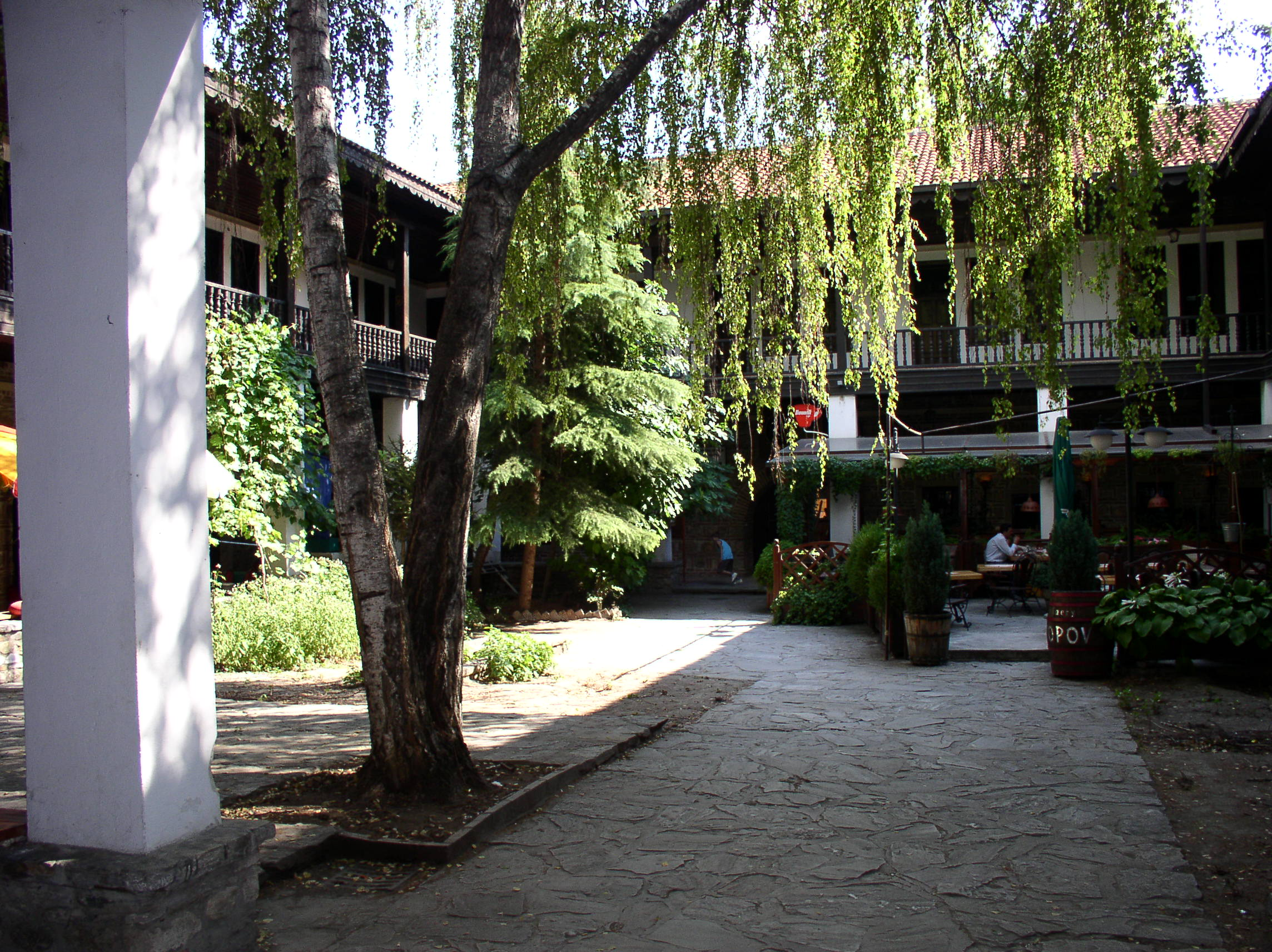
Part of Kapan An is now a restaurant

The Kapan Han has a surface area of 1,086 m². The building has two entrances, a ground level and second level. There were 44 rooms for guests and traders with their caravans. There was space for horses on the east side of the han.

The neighbourhood surrounding Kapan Han was known as Kapan.

== See also ==
- Caravanserai
- Old Bazaar, Skopje
- Ottoman Vardar Macedonia
