= Skopje fire of 1689 =

Urban fire set by invading Austrian forces

The fire of Skopje started on 26 October 1689 and lasted for two days, burning much of the city; only some stone-built structures, such as the fortress and some churches and mosques, were relatively undamaged. The fire had a disastrous effect on the city: its population declined from around 60,000 to around 10,000, and it lost its regional importance as a trading centre. Many residents settled in the imperial capital of Istanbul, creating the Üsküp mahallesi (Turkish for "Skopje neighborhood").

In 1689 the Austrian general Enea Silvio Piccolomini led an army to capture Kosovo, Bosnia and Macedonia from the Ottoman Empire.

In the same time, successful development of Skopje was suddenly interrupted in 1689 by the entry of the Austrian army into Macedonia. During the Austrian-Turkish war (1683–1699), Austrian troops under the command of General Piccolomini penetrated in an unstoppable advance far into the interior of European Turkey and, after taking the fortress of Kaçanik, descended into the Skopje plain. On 25 October 1689, they took Skopje without much struggle, for the Turkish army and some of the inhabitants had left the town. Ottoman forces were due back with a counteroffensive in three days. By order of General Piccolomini, Skopje was set on fire, and the conflagration lasted two days (26 and 27 October); great many houses and shops were destroyed. Along the way on his retreat from Skopje, General Piccolomini contracted and died from cholera. Some accounts of these events state that Piccolomini razed Skopje due to an inability of his forces to occupy and govern a city so far from his headquarters.

== Buildings damaged by the fire ==
- Church of the Ascension of Jesus
- Kapan Han
- Skopje clock tower
- İshak Bey Mosque
- Yahya Pasha Mosque
- Sultan Murad Mosque and its medrese
- Suli An
- Kursumli An
- Skopje Bedesten
- Arasta Mosque
