= Old Bazaar, Skopje =

Bazaar in Skopje, North Macedonia

Coordinates: 42°00′03″N 21°26′13″E

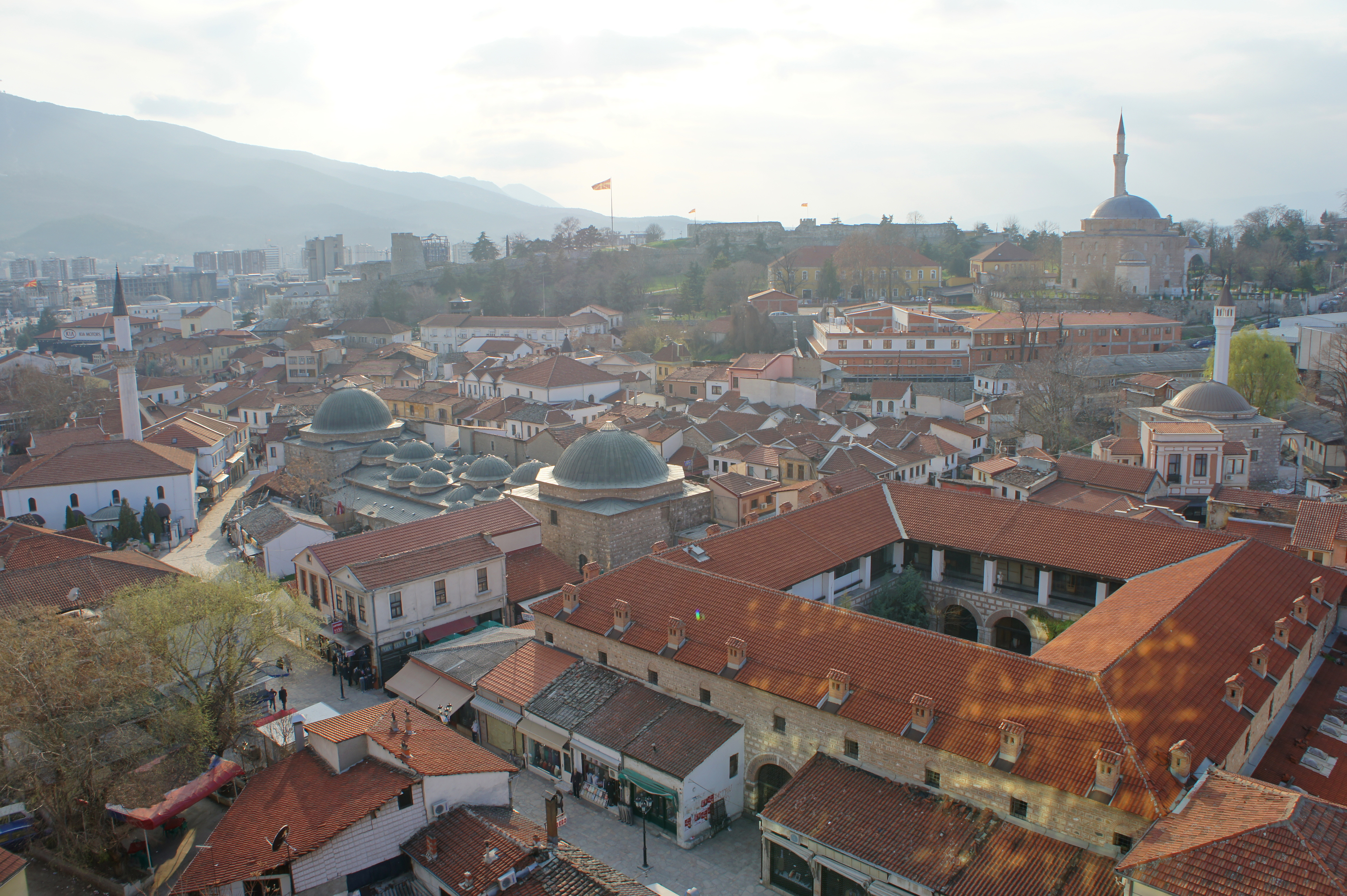
View above the Old Bazaar

The Old Bazaar (Macedonian: Стара чаршија, romanized: Stara čaršija; Albanian: Çarshia e Vjetër; Turkish: Eski Çarşı or Üsküp Türk Çarşısı) also known as Turkish Bazaar (Macedonian: Турска чаршија, romanized: Turska čaršija; Albanian: Çarshia e Vjetër Turke) is a bazaar located in Skopje, North Macedonia, situated on the eastern bank of the Vardar River, stretching from the Stone Bridge to the Bit-Pazar and from the Skopje Fortress to the Serava river. The Old Bazaar falls primarily within the borders of Čair Municipality but a part of it is located in Centar Municipality. As one of the oldest and largest marketplaces in the Balkans, it has been Skopje's centre for trade and commerce since at least the 12th century.

The earliest known sources that describe the existence of a merchant quarter on the bazaar's territory date back to the 12th century. During Ottoman rule of Skopje, the Old Bazaar developed rapidly to become city's main centre of commerce. The Ottoman history of the bazaar is evidenced by roughly thirty mosques, numerous caravanserais and hans, among other buildings and monuments. The bazaar was heavily damaged by the earthquake in 1555, the burning of the city in 1689, the earthquake in 1963, as well as during the First and the Second World Wars and faced various rebuildings following these events.

Beside its importance as a market place, the Old Bazaar is known for its cultural and historical values. Although Ottoman architecture is predominant, remains of Byzantine architecture are evident as well, while recent reconstructions have led to the application of elements specific to modern architecture. The Old Bazaar is still home to several active mosques, türbes, two churches and a clocktower, that, together with the buildings of the Museum of the Republic of North Macedonia and the Museum of Modern Art, form the core of the modern bazaar. The area is of significant importance to the Albanians, who form the majority in Čair Municipality. As such, the Skanderbeg Square has been established there.

In recent years there have been a raising interest to make the Bazaar a touristic attraction. On 13 October 2008, the Macedonian Parliament adopted a law recognising the Old Bazaar as cultural heritage of particular importance for the country to be permanently protected. In early 2010, the Macedonian Government began a project for the revitalisation of the Old Bazaar, which includes the restoration of several objects and aiming a further economic and cultural development of the site.

== History ==
Machiel Kiel has been conducting a contemporary architectural survey of the old bazaar before the Skopje earthquake of 1963.

=== Early period ===
The earliest known archaeological findings revealed at the Kale Fortress testify that the surrounding area has been inhabited since 4,000 BC, while the earliest historical facts mention the Paeonians as the first people who settled up on this area.

Following the fall of the city of Scupi under Roman rule, numerous Roman buildings, such as temples, thermaes, and theatres were built inside the city, that subsequently promoted it as an important religious and cultural centre in the Roman Empire.

In 518, Scupi was heavily damaged by a devastating earthquake, which prompted the Byzantine emperor Justinian I to rebuild a new capital that was located distantly from the destroyed city. Nevertheless, the local population settled up on a hilly area, where, later, the emperor Justinian ordered the construction of the Kale Fortress.

During the reign of king Samuel, Skopje was given a particular strategic, political, economic, and cultural importance, so that the surrounding area of the Kale hill was embanked by the enactment of defensive walls, in order to keep the treasures that were present in the settlement. At the time, there was a gate named "Watertower Gate", which was built with the purpose to defend the city against the successive attacks by the Byzantine emperor Basil II in 1001.

=== Middle Ages ===
==== Byzantine rule ====
After the fall of the First Bulgarian Empire under Byzantine rule in 1018, the emperor Basil II transformed Skopje into a capital of a theme and an episcopal see, whose bishop was elected for a four-year term. Following the death of Basil, his successor, Romanos III Argyros, undertook activities to reconstruct the Monastery of St. Georgi, which was situated on the place where today the Sultan Murad Mosque is located. It is said that the monastery, at the time, was one of the most reputable and decorated monasteries in most of the Balkans.

With the coming to power of the Komnenni dynasty in the beginning of the 12th century, the city lived a relatively calm period and saw significant development. The development was followed by construction of walls and defense towers around Dolengrad, monasteries and churches. Strong development contributed to the city to take the position of an important trading center which was visited by merchants from many other places like Dubrovnik and Republic of Venice.

==== Serbian rule ====
In 1282, the Serbian King Stefan Uros II Milutin conquered Skopje, the city became a part of Raska and later within the medieval Serbian state. This period is characterized by the construction of numerous churches, monasteries and palaces in and around the city. During his stay in Skopje in 1299 and 1300, the Byzantine envoy Theodore Metochites noted that apart Gorengrad, there was Dolengrad, which was protected by walls.

King Stefan Dusan In 1345 Skopje was declared the capital of Serbian Kingdom by Stefan Dusan. The following year he was crowned king in Skopje. During this time the area of bazaar was a particular shopping center, but the city generally stated as the main trade center with developed crafts, where a special role had merchants from Dubrovnik and Republic of Venice. In addition it is possible that today's Sultan Murat mosque is located in the exact place where Dushan's royal palace was.

After the death of Stefan Dusan, the city was under Serbian rule until 1385 when Vuk Brankovic surrendered to the Ottomans and Skopje became part of the Ottoman Empire.

==== Ottoman Period ====
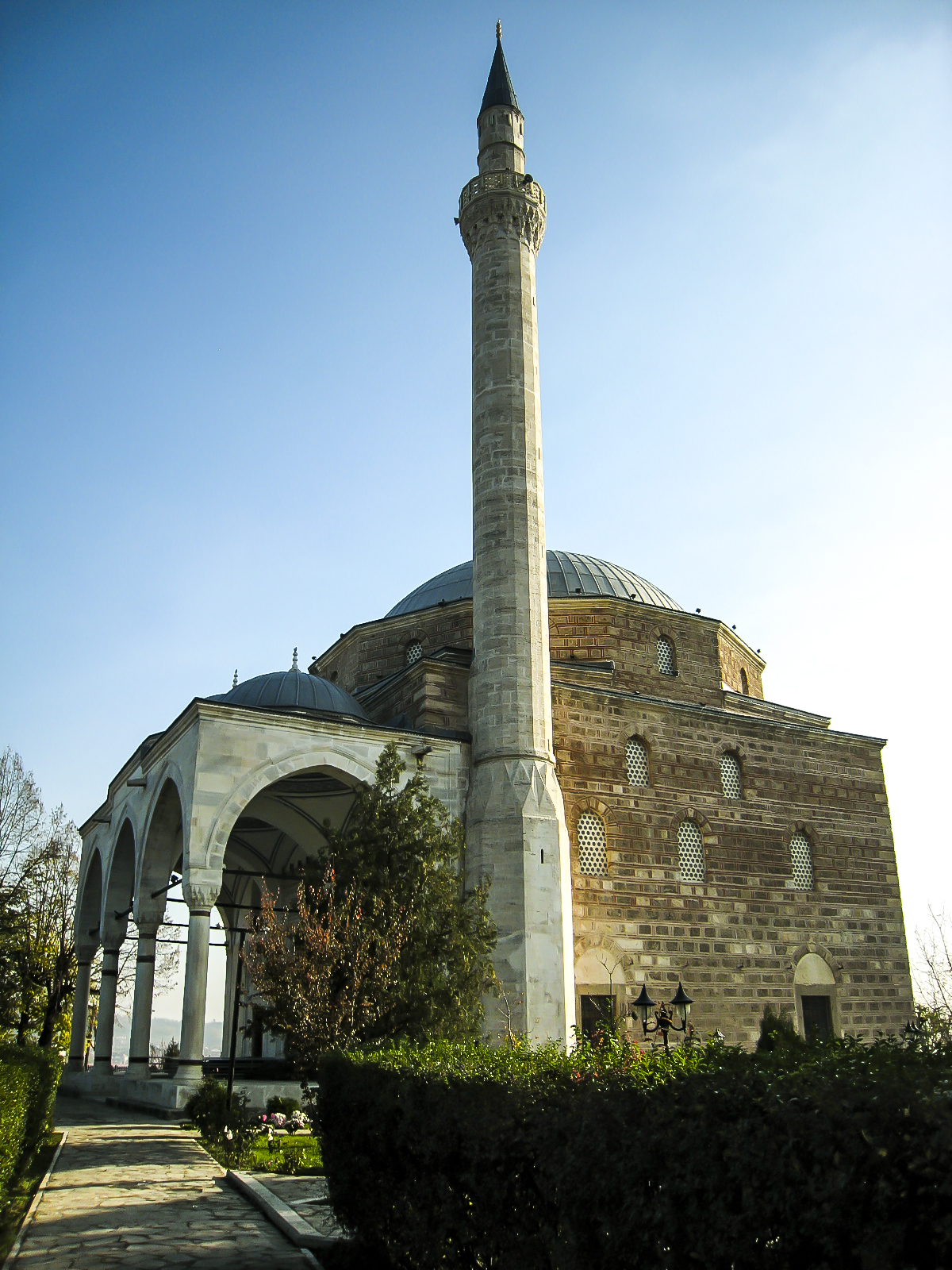
Mustafa Pasha Mosque

The conquest by the Ottoman Turks rapidly began to change the ethnic composition of the Skopje. The wealth with which handled the local churches, monasteries, and the population itself passed into the hands of the Turks. The city transformed into a military stronghold and the construction of several buildings of religious character changed the architecture of the city. A number of typical Ottoman buildings were built immediately after the conquest. Those objects were built primarily to serve Muslim population.

Major changes to the architectural character of the current Old Bazaar occurred during governorship of Ishak Beg and his son Isa Bey. Ishak Beg began construction of Sultan Murad Mosque, which construction was completed in 1436. In 1438 began construction of Ishak Beg Mosque and the mausoleum where Ishak Beg was buried. After his death his son and successor, Isa Beg, constructed numerous buildings in what is today Old Bazaar. These buildings, constructed between 1445 and 1469, were indispensable for the economic development of the city. Thus, during this time Skopje saw new buildings like Bezisten and Çifte Hamam. After the death of Isa Beg, in accordance with his testament was built Isa Beg Mosque (1475) and later Haji-kasamova mosque (1489–1490) and Mustafa Pasha Mosque (1492).

In the period from 1489 to 1497 Daut Pasha, Grand Vesir of East Rumelia, invested in the construction of several buildings in the bazaar, among which the most famous is Daut Pasha Hamam. At the same time were built imarets i.e. public houses where food was prepared and served to the homeless and travelers who have stayed in the city.

During the 16th and 17th centuries, the Bazaar reached its urban and economic zenith, developing into one of the greatest oriental bazaars in the Balkans. The accelerated development of trade and the construction of new stores and facilities continued further. In 1504, near the bazaar, Yahya Pasha built Yahya Pasha Mosque which still survives today. Kurşumli Han inn was built in the middle of the century, and in 1543 began the construction of the Church of the Ascension of Jesus, which was the first Christian project that was approved during the Ottoman period in Skopje. The strong earthquake which struck in Skopje 1555, caused massive damage in the bazaar, but the city soon recovered and continued unimpeded development of trade. During this time most of trade took place thanks to the influential Jewish colony and other colonies were created like that of merchants from Dubrovnik.

=== Modern period ===
==== Yugoslavia ====
There are preserved important buildings of the Ottoman period within the Old Bazaar. The buildings have undergone changes in their social, religious and cultural usage such as mosques that were linked with madrassas, caravansaries, libraries, water fountains and burial chambers. Following the 1963 earthquake, urban planners pursued a museification of the area reserving it mainly for foreign visitors and ideological reasons for doing so were based upon Yugoslav socialism and its understandings of secularism and modernity.

==== Independent Macedonia ====
For some months following the inter-ethnic conflict of 2001, Macedonians were cautious and hesitant to stroll around the Old Bazaar as the place was associated with criminality, uncleanliness and Albanians by Macedonians.

From 2005 onward Čair municipality outlined a vision for the capital city's historic core and implemented policies that promoted the revival of the Old Bazaar to its former Ottoman state with specific boundaries for the area. Its initiatives include the refurbishment of the area's historical architecture, inaugurating a Jazz festival, opening a House of the esnaf (professional guilds with Ottoman era origins) and reserving a hall for the arts and music. The urban planners of Čair, mainly Albanians, view the Old Bazaar as characterised by its Ottoman heritage and identity that was neglected or destroyed by architects from the Yugoslav and post Yugoslav eras. The local Turkish community of Skopje has significantly contributed to the history of the Old Bazaar and supported initiatives for the refurbishment of Skopje's historical core associated with the Ottoman period. Due to five centuries of Ottoman rule the old Bazaar is still filled with preserved Ottoman style buildings, narrow cobblestone walkways, many mosques and small craftsmen shops. The Old Bazaar is a travel destination for tourists from overseas.

==== Public Opinion ====
Different perspectives based on community experiences of the space exists among Albanians and Macedonians of the history of the Old Bazaar. For local Albanians, the Yugoslav era and its socialist understanding of architectural modernism resulted in neglect and failure to properly restore Ottoman religious heritage in the area. Tourism existed and the area economically benefited until the Yugoslav financial crisis of the 1980s. Following independence in 1991, the political elite in power took a nationalist path and as the Old Bazaar is perceived as Albanian it was allowed to decay. A refurbishment initiative during the 1990s on the Old Stone Bridge prevented people from crossing the structure and it resulted in negative economic effects for many craftsmen of the Old Bazaar. Following the 2001 conflict and the 2004 redrawing process of municipality borders, against a backdrop of limited state funds the Old Bazaar has flourished once again due to a proactive mayor, municipal actions and initiatives resulting in new urban development.

For local Macedonians the Old Bazaar of the 1960s was industrious, lively, disorderly and a multiethnic place where Macedonians, Albanians, Turks and Romani lived, traded and worked alongside each other. Over a span of twenty to thirty years the area underwent a demographic change of Albanisation and it became reflected in the usage of the Latin alphabet and Albanian writing in shops of the Old Bazaar. At the beginning of the 1990s the Old Bazaar was associated with Albanian criminality and the black market. Toward the end of the decade the Old Bazaar was still a popular place for Macedonian youth to socialise with friends. The historical core of Skopje was viewed as more aesthetically pleasing unlike the southern half of the capital with its socialist era buildings. Many cafes and restaurants existed and received visits from the few foreigners working in Macedonia. The conflict of 2001 was the turning point as Macedonians abandoned the Old Bazaar for the right bank of the river Vardar, especially after new restaurants and bars opened in that area. Following those transformations the Old Bazaar gained an Albanian character.

== Landmarks ==
=== Bezisten ===
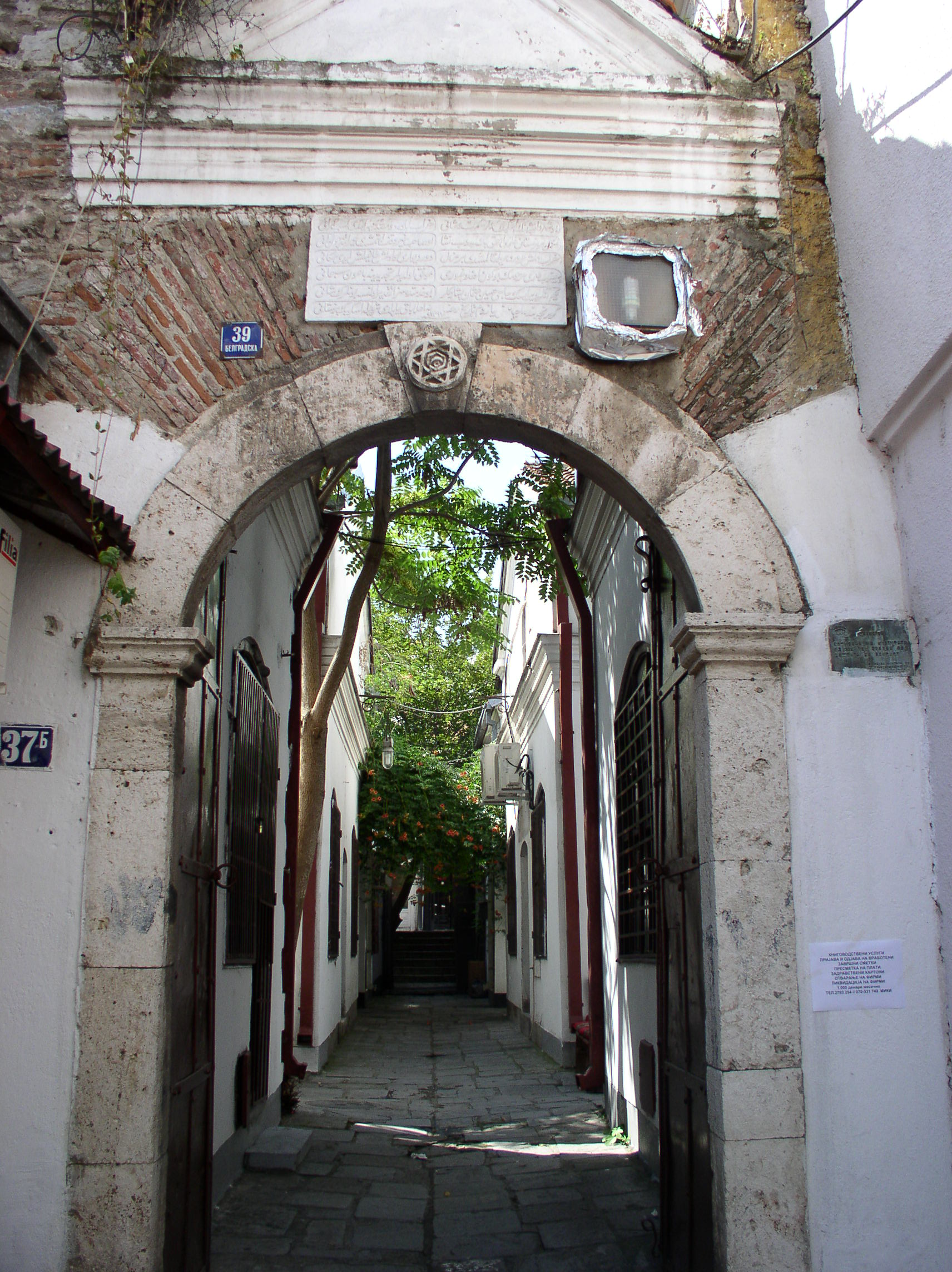
Bezisten

Skopje's bezisten, a covered market, was built in the 15th century by Gazi Ishak Bey, the Sultan's Skopje regent. It was destroyed by a fire in 1689 and was later rebuilt. The bezisten has looked the same since its renovation in 1899.

=== Clock tower ===
Skopje's clock tower, built in the 16th century on the foundations of an older edifice, is located just north of the Sultan Murad Mosque. Originally built of wood, the top was replaced with bricks in 1902.

The hexagonal tower was heavily damaged during the 1963 earthquake. It was soon fully repaired.

=== Čifte Hamam ===
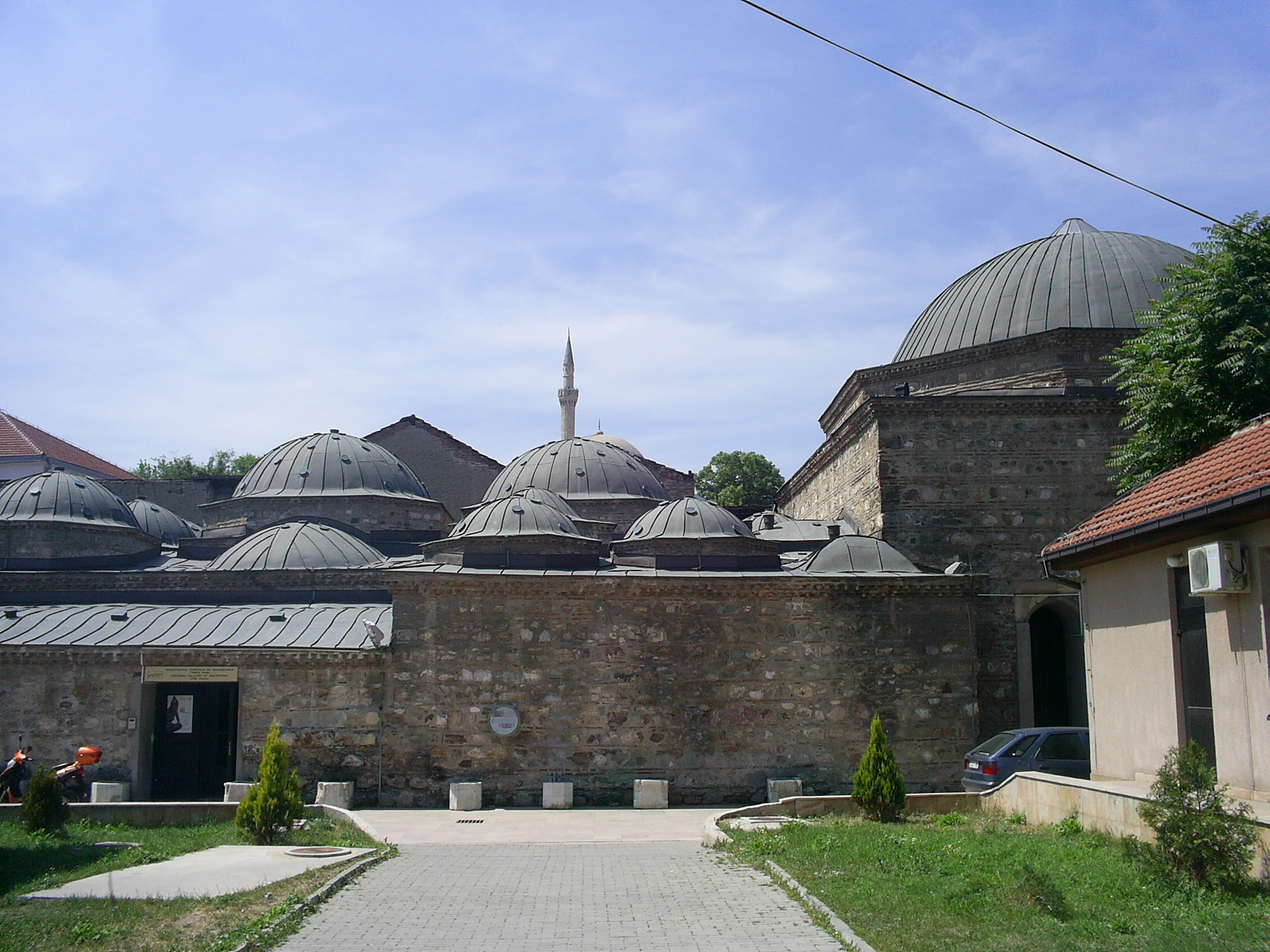
Çifte Hamam

The Čifte Hamam (Turkish for 'double bath'), located in the centre of the old bazaar, was built in the 15th century under Isa Bey. The building is divided into two wings (hence the name 'double'): one for men and one for women. The layout of both sections are nearly identical.

The Čifte Hamam was used as a bathhouse until 1915. After suffering damages during the 1963 earthquake, it was repaired and has housed the Contemporary Art Gallery since then.

=== Daut Pasha Hamam ===
Daut Pasha, Grand Vesir of East Rumelia, constructed this hamam in the 15th century. The building consists of fifteen rooms covered by thirteen domes. The two largest domes covered the two changing rooms and the rest of the domes covered individual bathing rooms.

Since 1948, the Daut Paşa Hamam has housed the National Art Gallery.

=== Isa Bey Mosque ===
Situated on the outskirts of the bazaar, this mosque was built as a memorial for Isa Bey after his death. The mosque has two dominant domes and five smaller ones above the porch area.

=== Ishak Bey Mosque ===
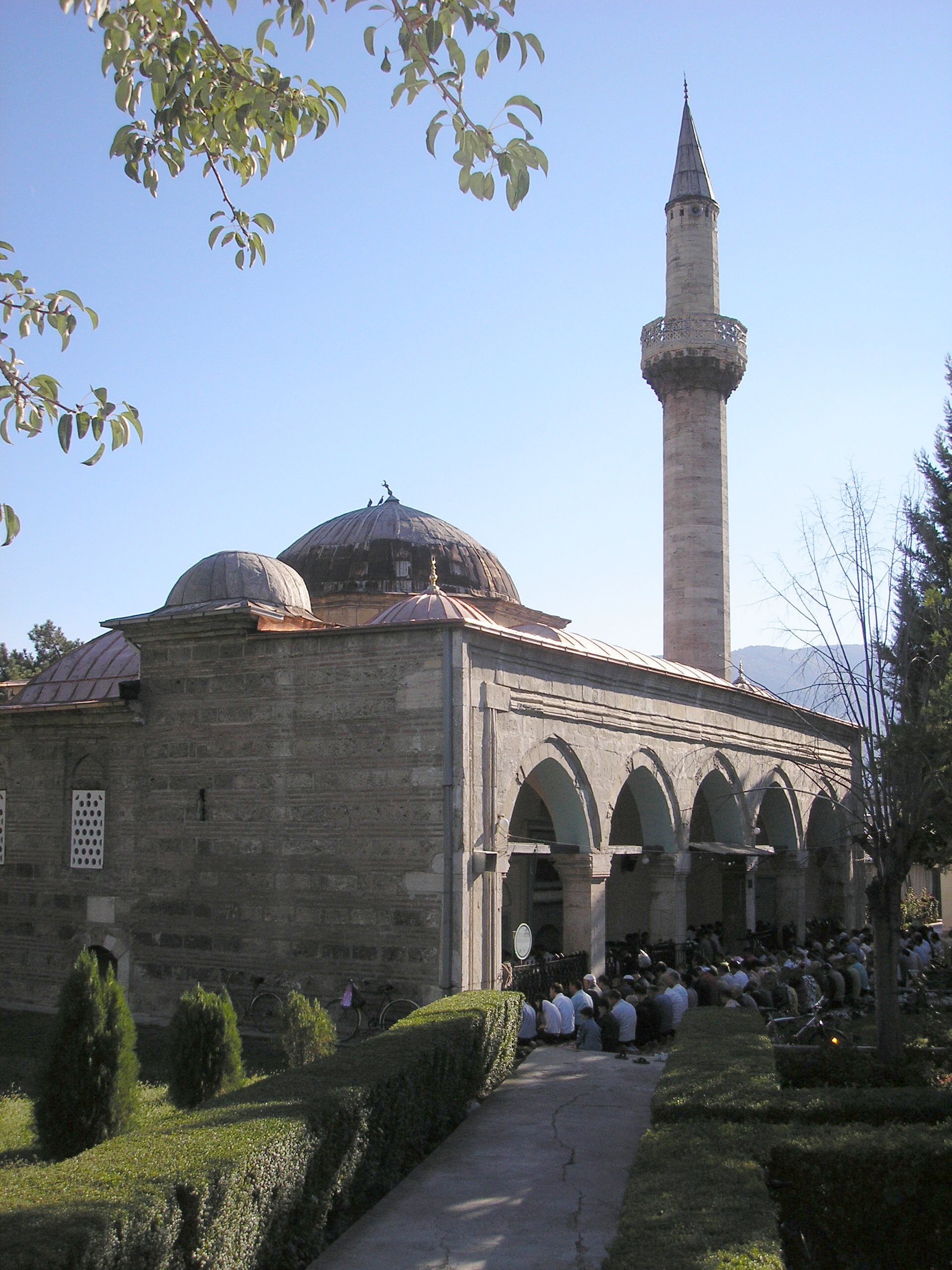
Ishak Bey Mosque

Also known as the Decorated (Aladža) Mosque because of the floral decorations, inscriptions and coloured tiles found on its walls, the Ishak Bey Mosque was constructed in 1438 in the northern part of the Old Bazaar. The mosque's minaret rises 30 meters (98.4 feet). There is a türbe located behind the mosque. Within this mosque was one of the first Islamic libraries in Europe.

=== Kale Fortress ===
Located on the highest hill in Skopje, overlooking the city and the river, the area upon which the fortress was built was first inhabited in prehistoric times, according to archaeological findings.

Most researchers believe that the fortress was first constructed in the 11th century.

=== Kapan Han ===
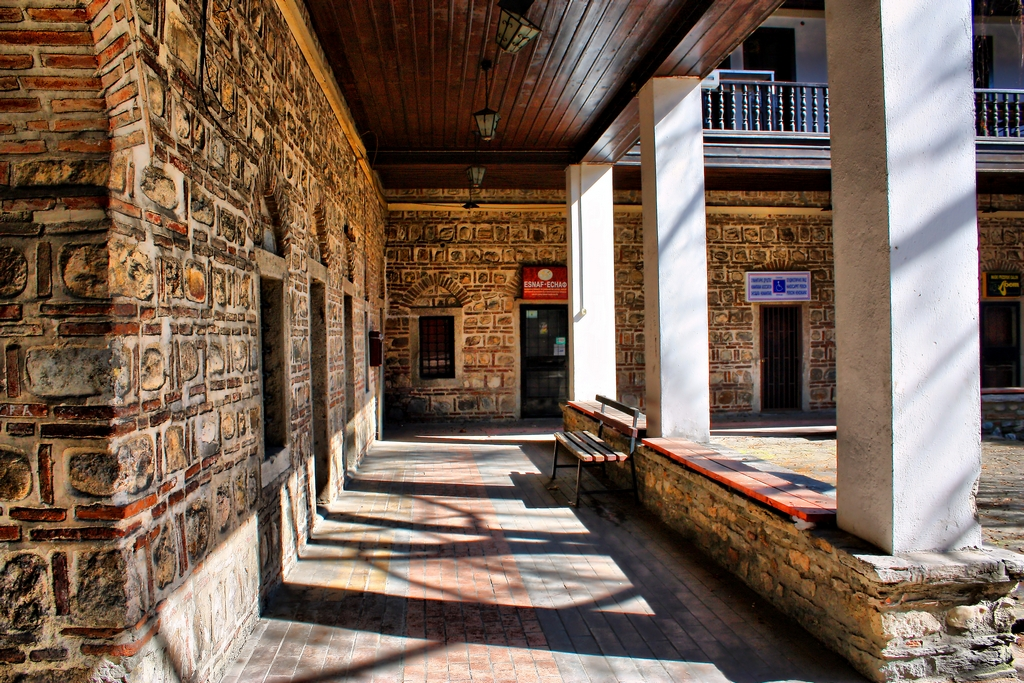
Kapan Han

One of the three remaining caravanserais in the Old Bazaar, the Kapan Han was built in the 15th century. The rooms in the upper floor were available to guests, while the ground floor was used as a stable to house the guests' horses and cattle.

=== Kuršumli Han ===
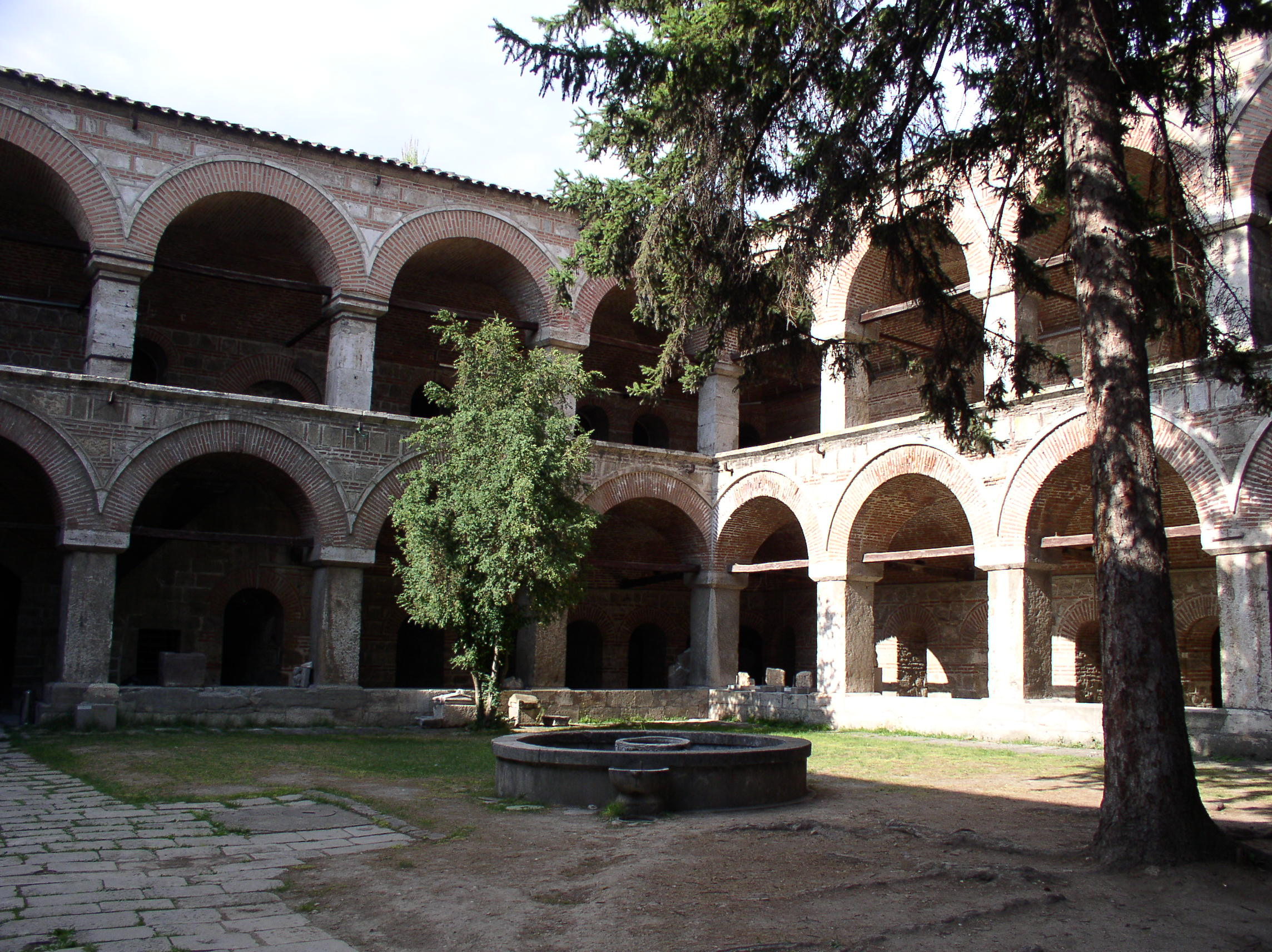
Kurşumli Han

The largest of the three remaining caravanserais, the Kuršumli Han (Turkish for 'Lead Inn') was built by Musein Odza, the son of a scientist at Sultan Selim II's court, in the 16th century.

The roof of the inn was once covered in lead (hence the name), but was removed during World War I. The Kuršumli Han also has several small pyramidically-shaped domes. The building has a ground floor, which housed the cattle and horses, and a first floor, which housed the guests.

The attached mosque, built in the 17th century, and most of the hamam, built in the 15th century, were destroyed in the 1963 earthquake.

Today, the former han houses the statue collection of the Museum of the Republic of North Macedonia.

=== Mustafa Pasha Mosque ===
The Mustafa Pasha Mosque, built in 1492 by Mustafa Pasha on an older Christian site, stands above the Old Bazaar, near Kale Fortress. Considered one of the most elegant Islamic buildings in Macedonia, the complex includes the mosque, the tomb of Mustapha Paşa, the sarcophagus of one of his daughters, a fountain, and remnants of other buildings.

The mosque is square in shape and its largest dome is 16 metres (52.5 feet) in diameter. The porch is positioned on four marble pillars, decorated with stalactite, and covered by three small domes. The interior is decorated and includes calligraphic inscriptions. The minaret of Mustafa Paşa Mosque, rising 42 metres (137.8 feet) is made of limestone.

Mustafa Pasha is buried in the hexagonal marble türbe covered by a dome above a short eight-sided tambour. Umi, one of his four daughters, is buried in the decorated sarcophagus which includes Persian inscriptions on two of the four walls. The mosque courtyard is filled with roses and, due to its elevated location, offers a distinct view of the Old Bazaar.

=== Church of the Holy Salvation ===
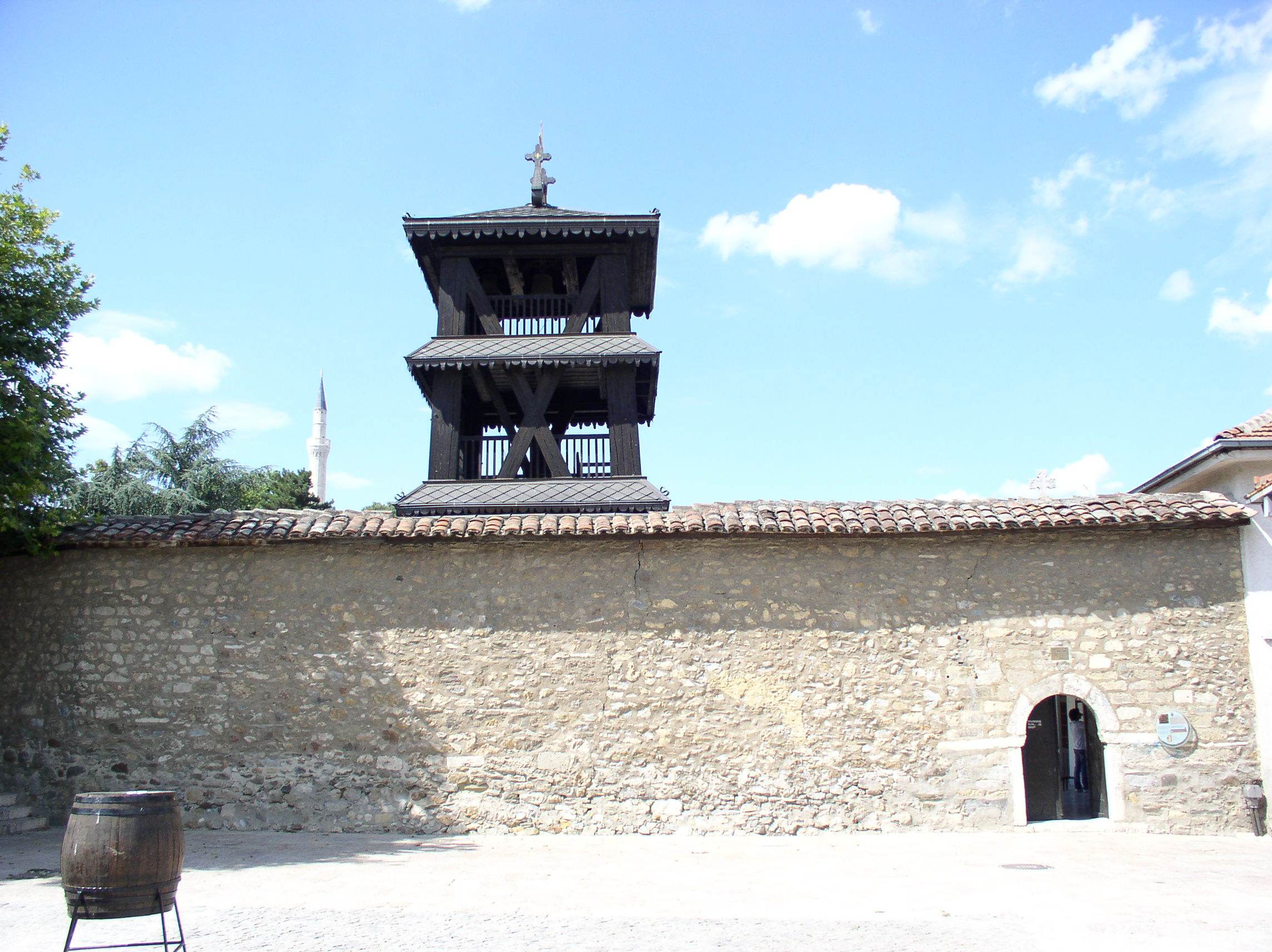
Entrance to the Church of Holy Salvation in Skopje

Constructed in the 19th century on the foundations of an older church, half of the church was built underground as it was illegal under Ottoman rule for Christian buildings to be taller than Islamic buildings so mosques could dominate the city skyline. The church got its present appearance in the 19th century.

The church's iconstasis was carved in wood and is 10 metres (32.8 feet) long, 4.5 to 7 metres (14.8 to 23 feet) in height.

Revolutionary Goce Delčev is buried in a white stone sarcophagus in the church's courtyard.

=== Stone Bridge ===
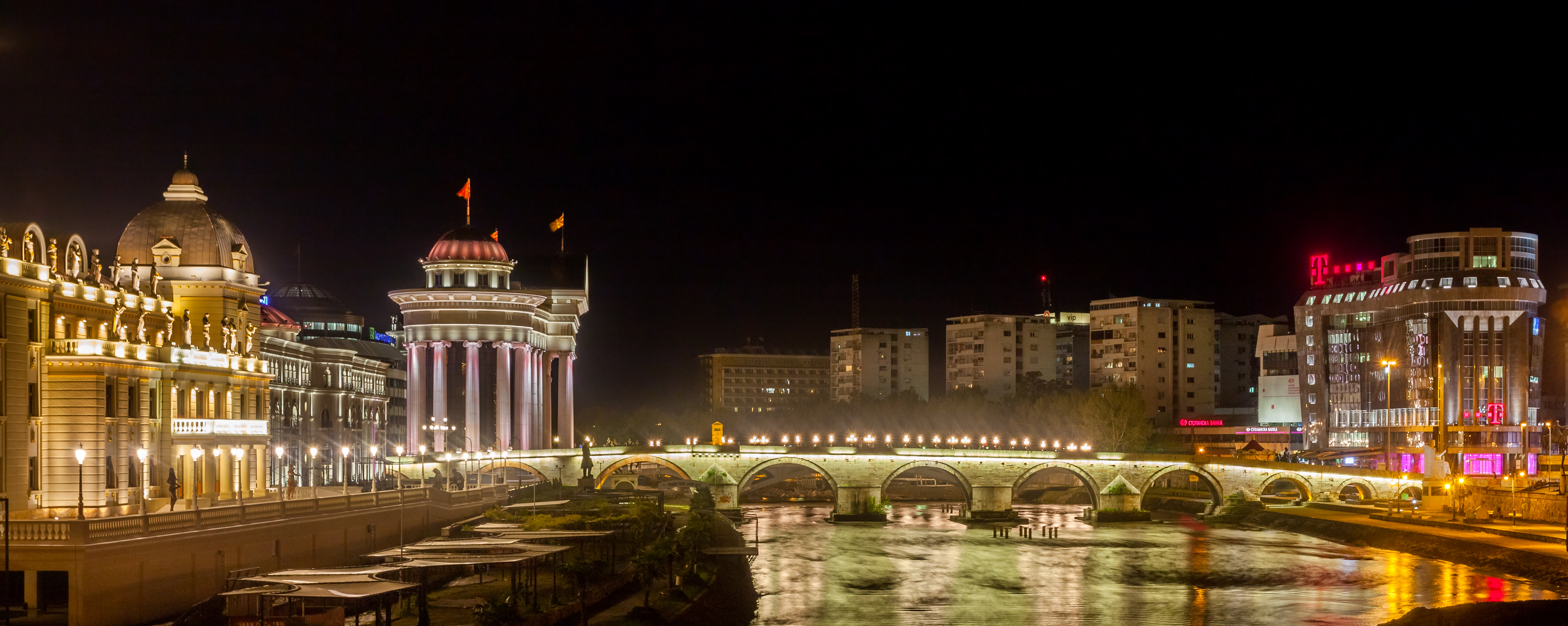
Stone Bridge at night

The Stone Bridge, across the Vardar River, connects the Old Bazaar to Macedonia Square in the new part of the city. The bridge, built in the 15th century under Sultan Murad, was built of stone blocks as its name suggests, which has helped it survive the fires and earthquakes Skopje has seen. The Stone Bridge has had the same appearance since it was first built.

The bridge has 12 semicircular arches and is 214 metres (702 feet) long. During Ottoman rule, countless executions were conducted on the Stone Bridge.

=== Suli Han ===
The Suli Han was built under Ishak Bey in the 15th century. It has two floors with the upper having 54 rooms for the guests and the lower for the guests' cattle. It was fully repaired after sustaining heavy damaged during the 1963 earthquake.

The han today houses the Skopje Academy of Art and the Old Bazaar Museum.

=== Sultan Murad Mosque ===
Sultan Murad built this mosque in 1463, just south of where the clock tower would be built. The mosque has remained mostly undamaged through the fires and earthquakes Skopje has sustained.

The Sultan Murad Mosque is rectangular in shape, with a porch including four columns with decorated caplets, connected by arcades.

=== Bit Pazar ===
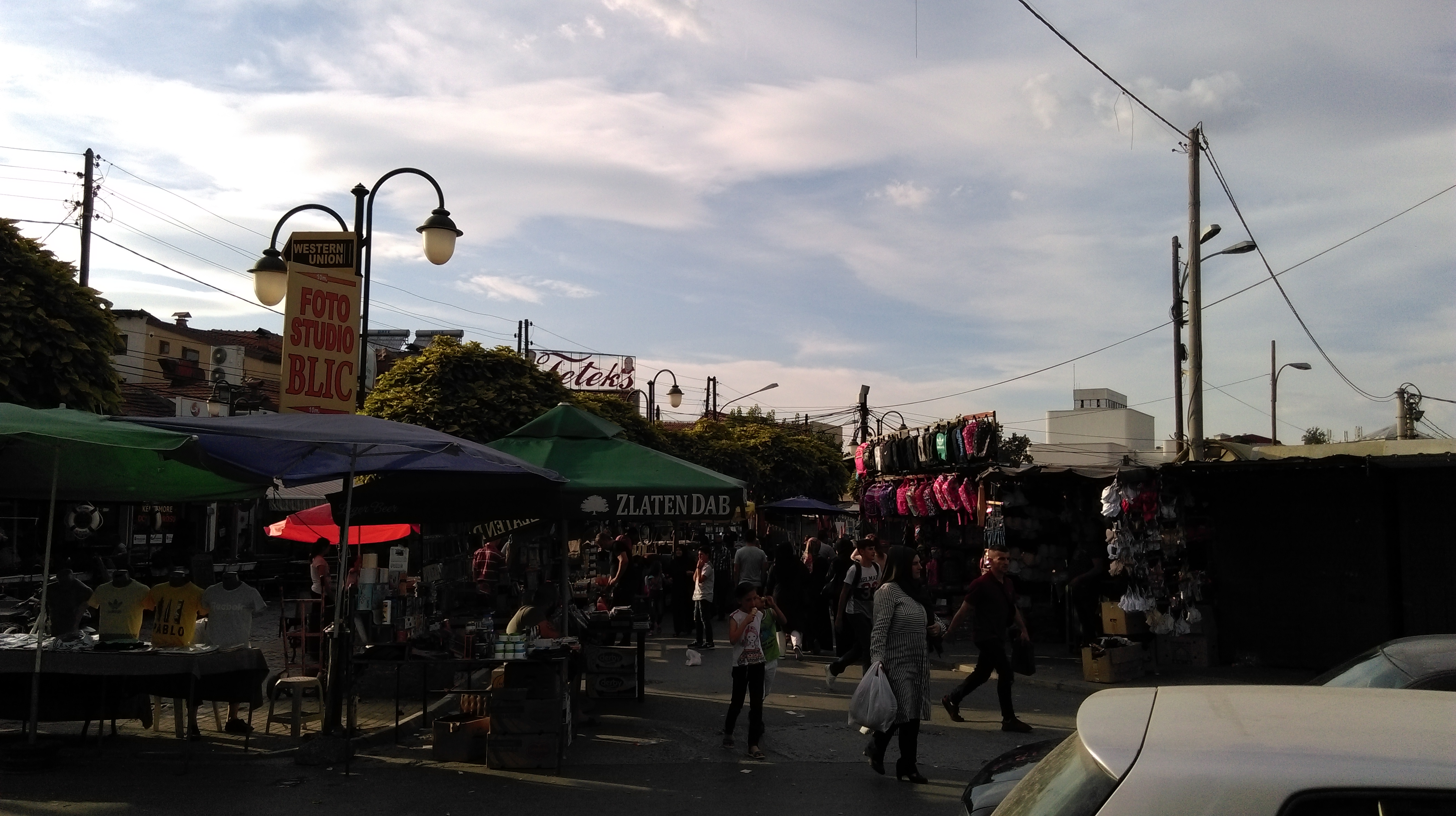
Bit Pazar

Bit Pazar is part of the wider area of the Čaršija or Old Bazaar. Skopje's largest market, Bit Pazar is located next to the Old Bazaar proper and retained its multi-ethnic and multi-lingual environment where rural people come to sell farming produce and locals conduct business. During 2007-2008 a gate was built called the "Ottoman door" to separate the Čaršija and increase its individuality from Bit Pazar.

=== Skanderbeg Square ===
An existing statue of Skanderbeg, an important historical figure to ethnic Albanians, is the main fixture of a square that bears his name located at the entrance to Skopje's Old Bazaar. The square's total cost is estimated at around 10 million euros and was completed in 2018. The square covers 28,000 m^{2} (301,389 ft^{2}) and extends from the Macedonian Philharmonic and Macedonian Opera to the Old Bazaar. To accommodate construction a portion of the square was built on top of Goce Delčev Boulevard. Aside from plenty open space, the square contains an amphitheatre, a fountain, and underground parking.

== Gallery ==
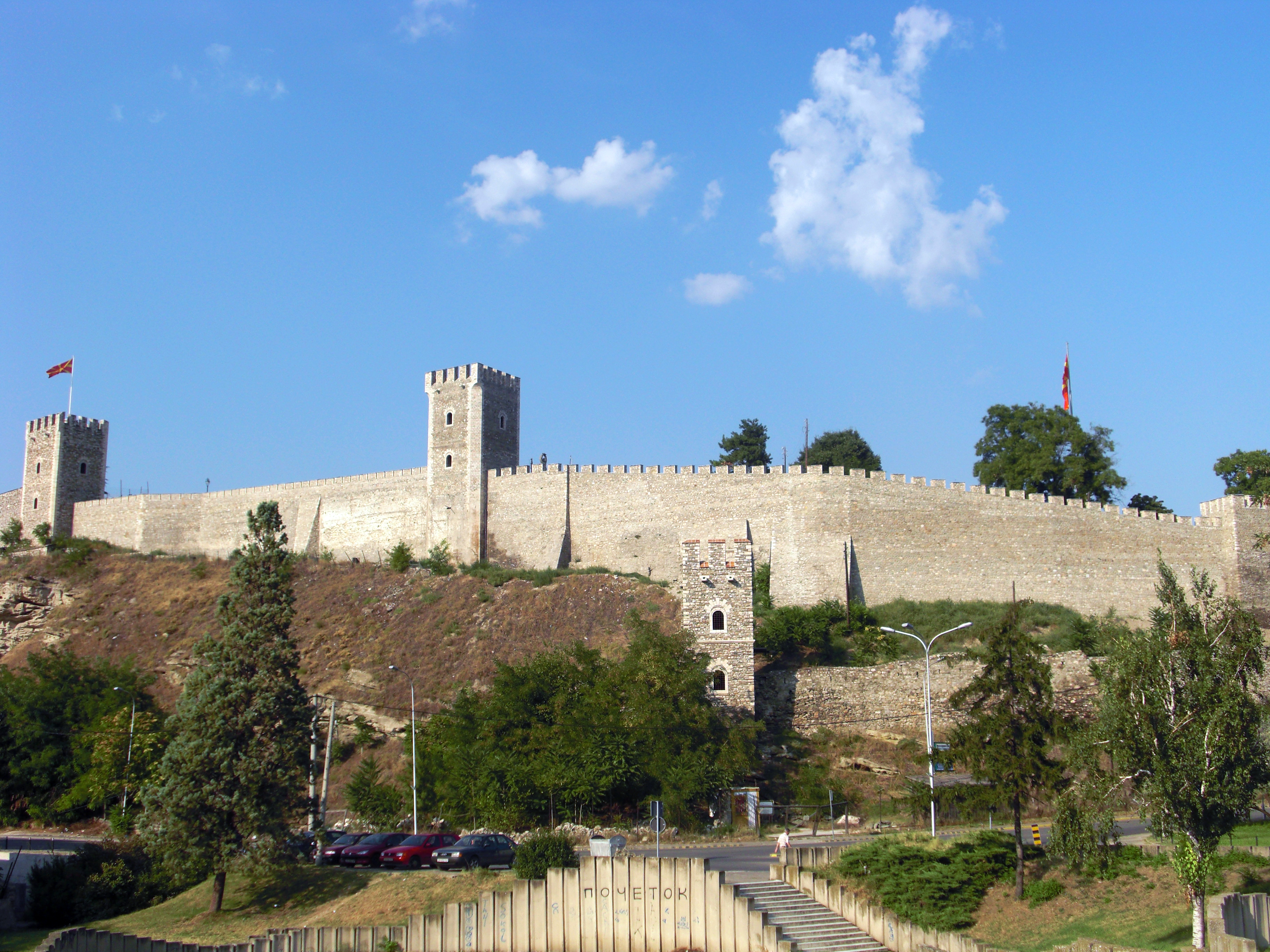
Kale Fortress

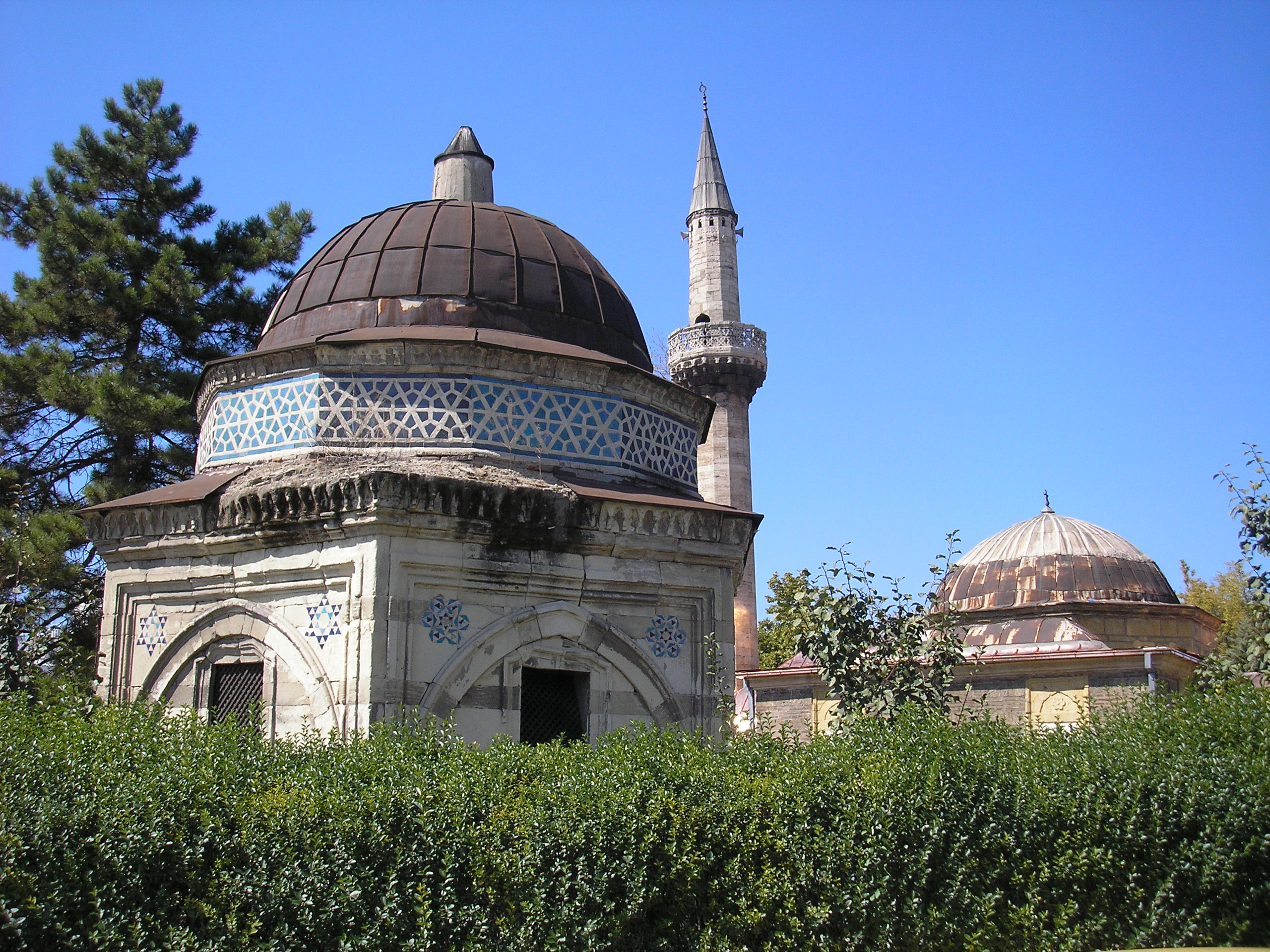
Türbe at Ishak Bey Mosque

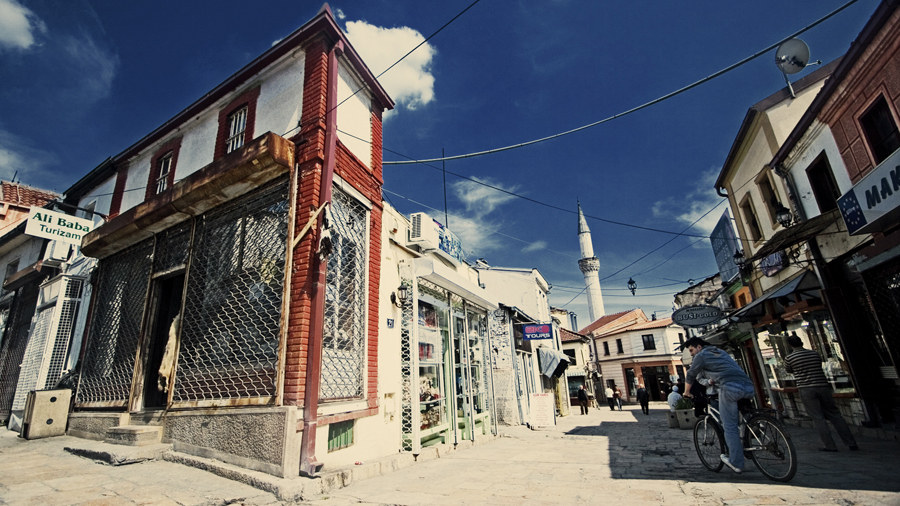
Street in old bazaar

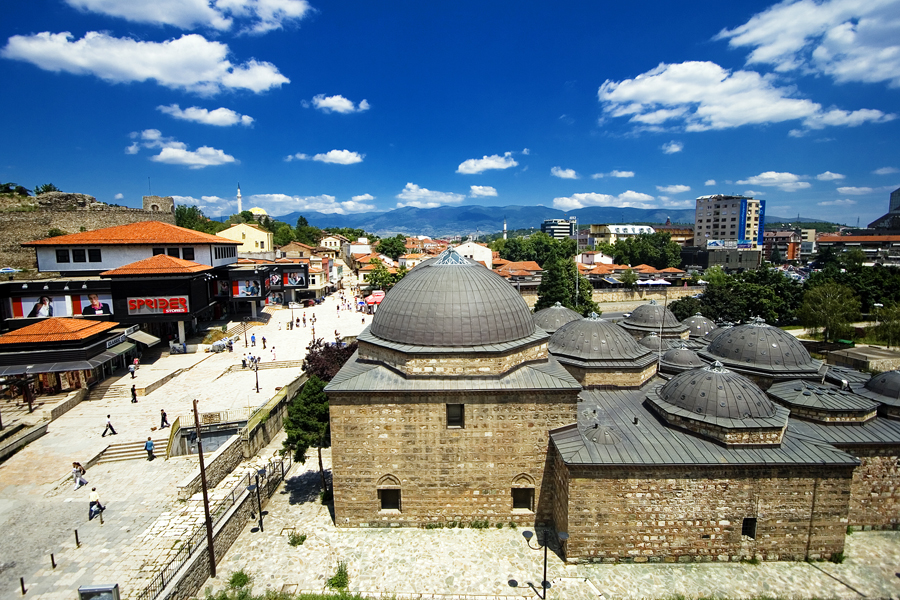
View over Daut Paşa Hamam

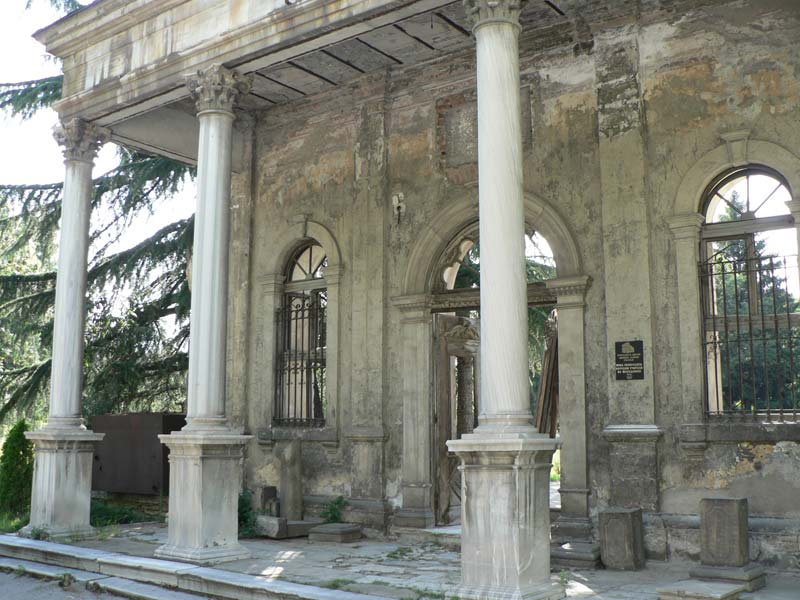
Old school

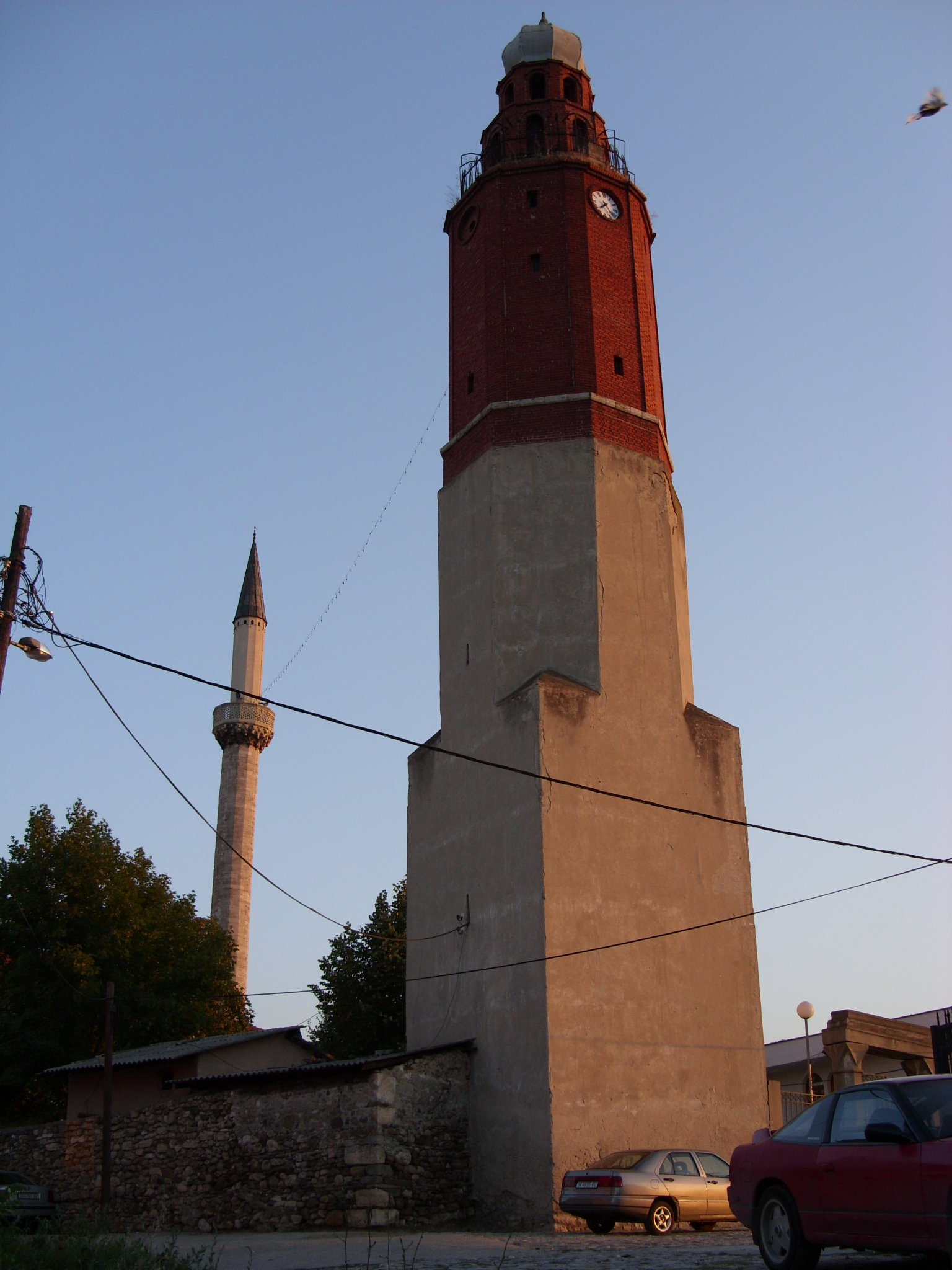
Clock tower of the Old Bazaar

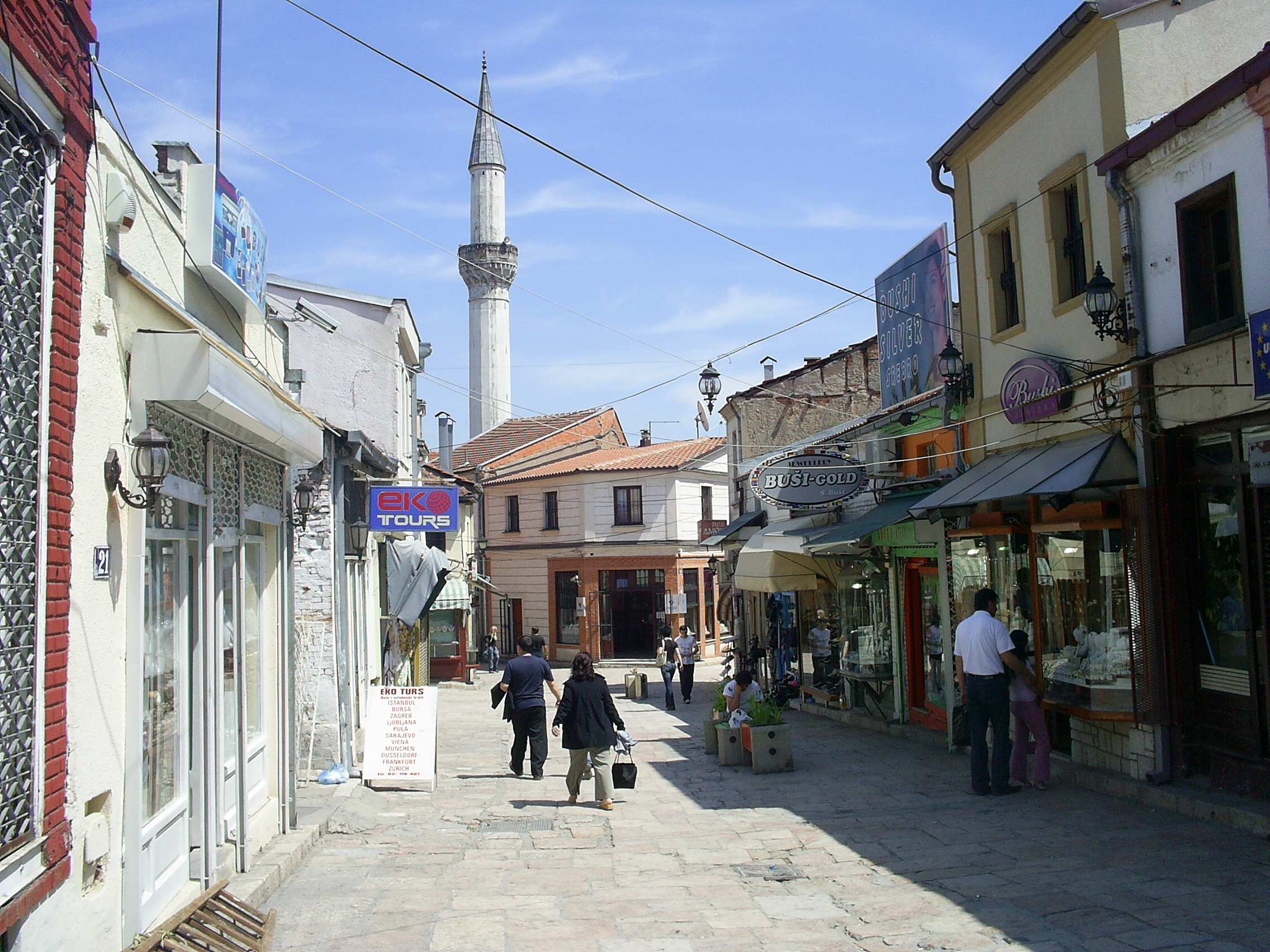
Street in old bazaar

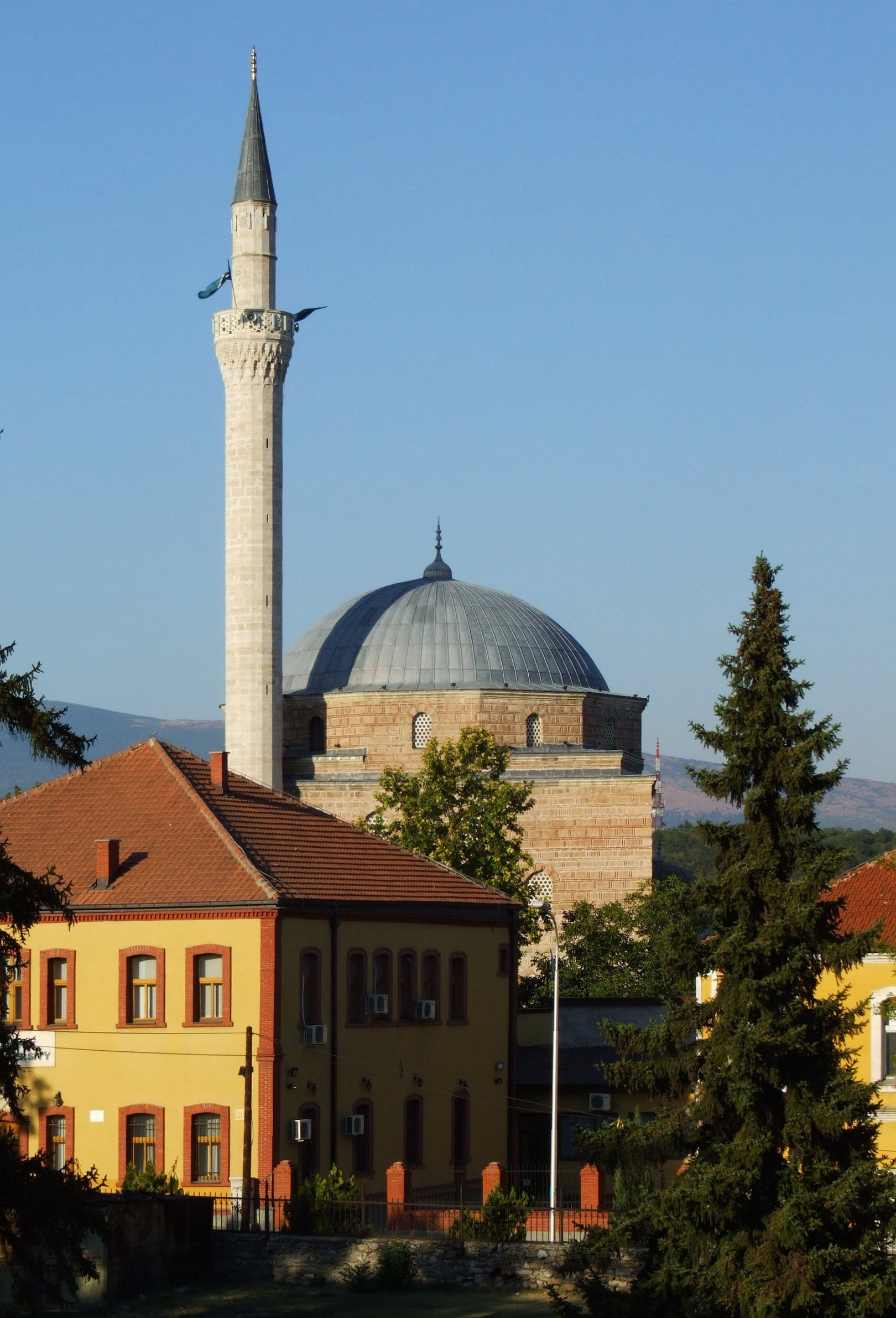
Mustafa Paşa Mosque

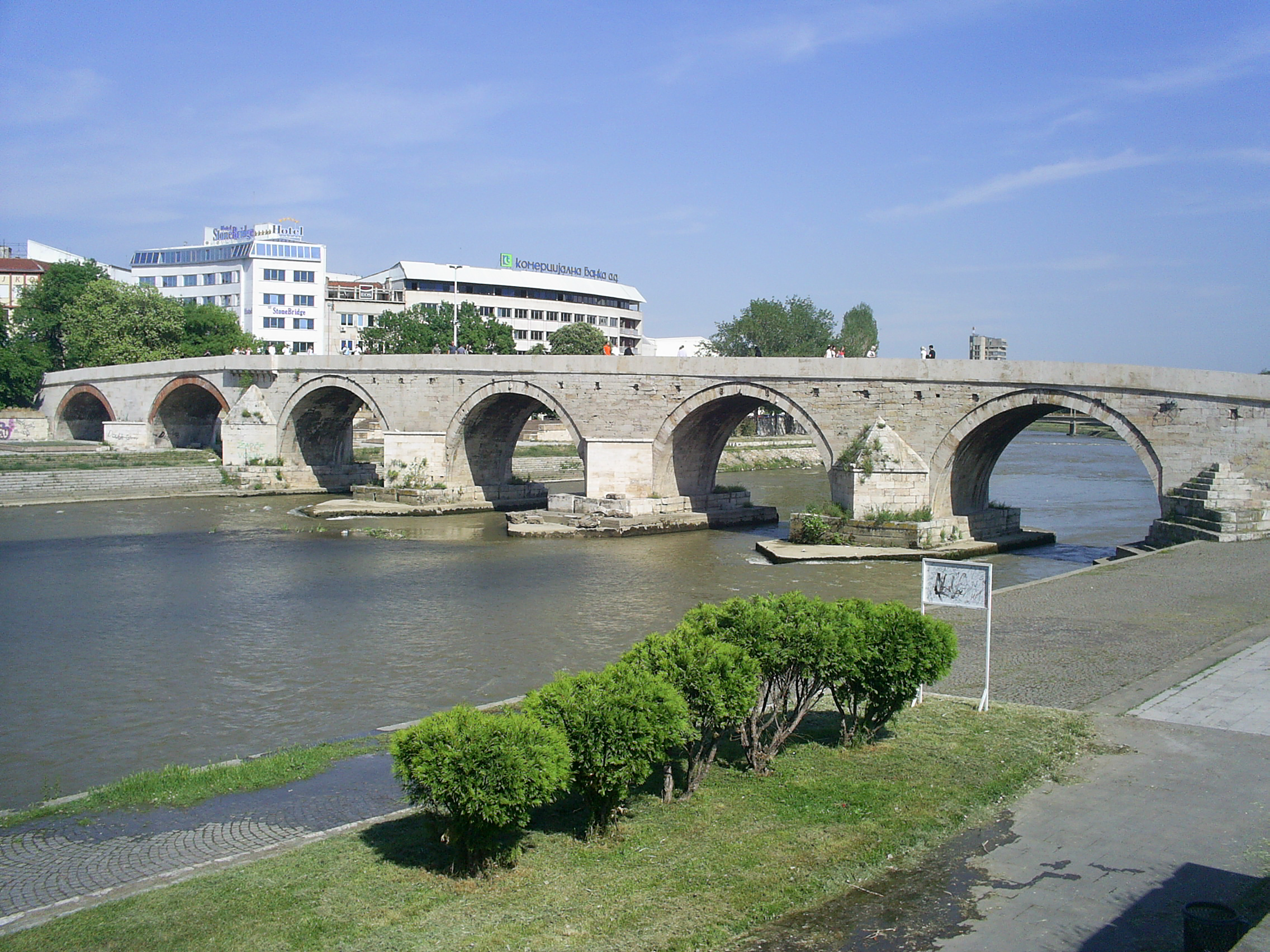
Stone Bridge

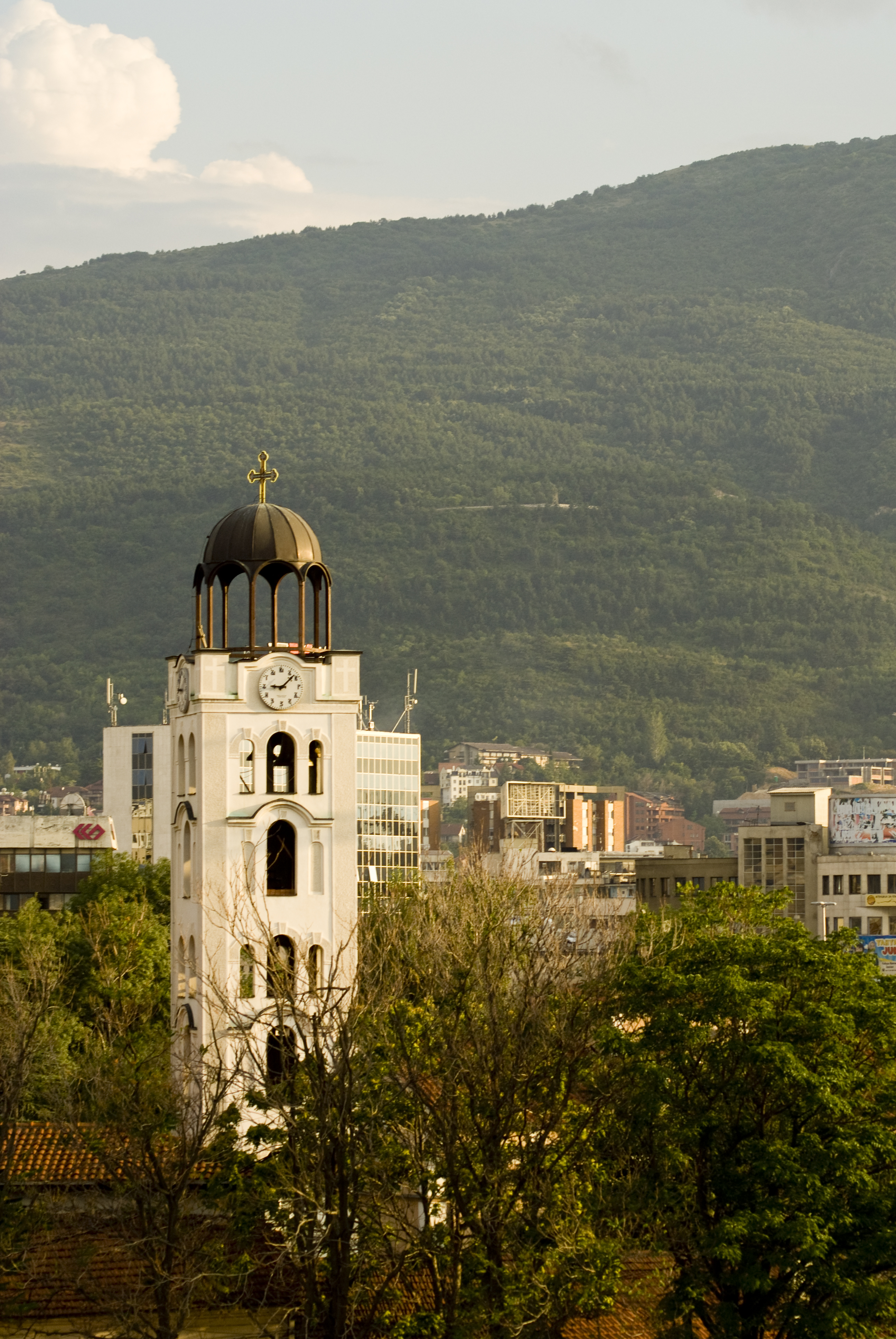
Clock tower of St. Demetrius Church

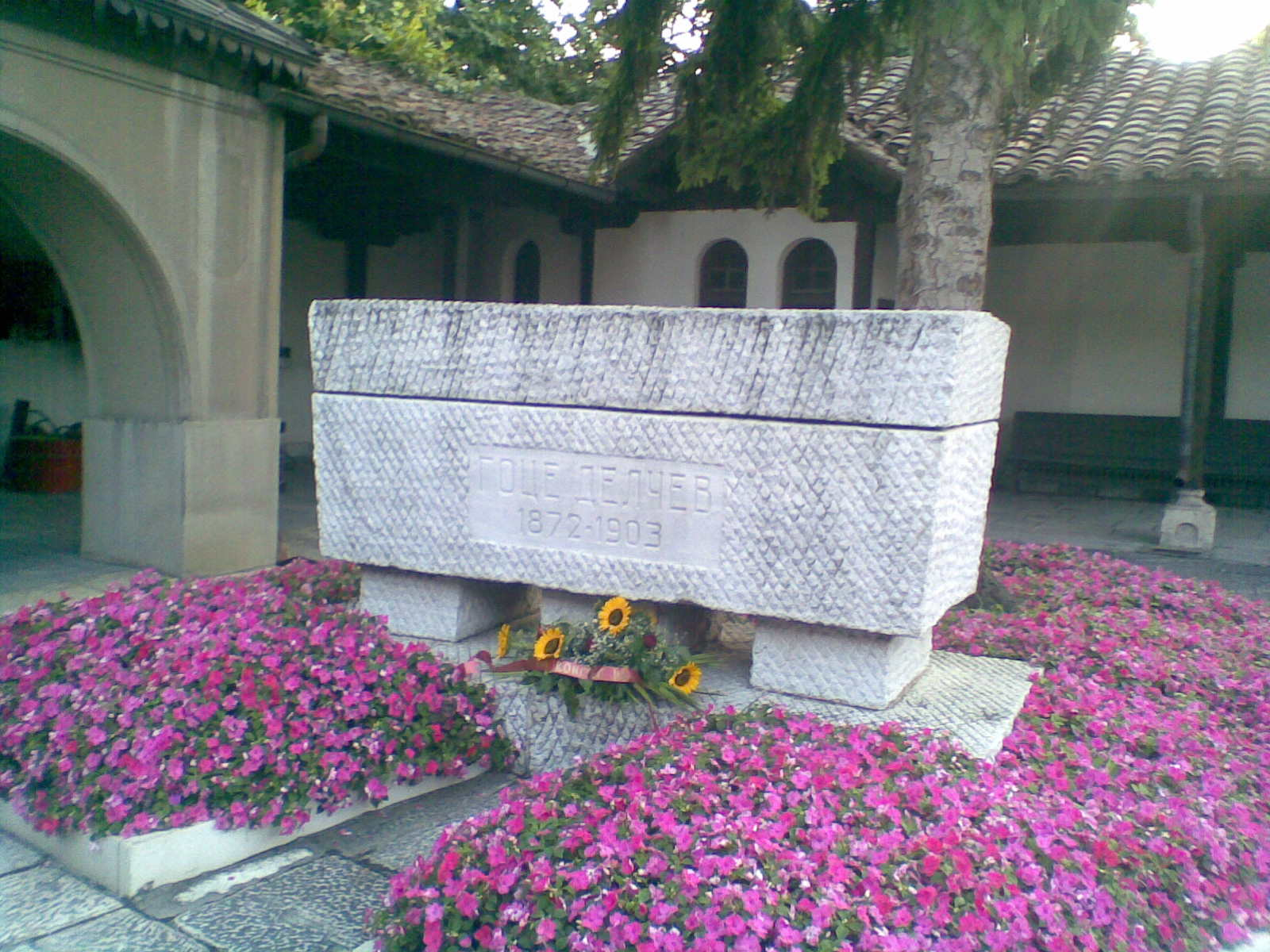
Goce Delčev's tomb at St. Spas

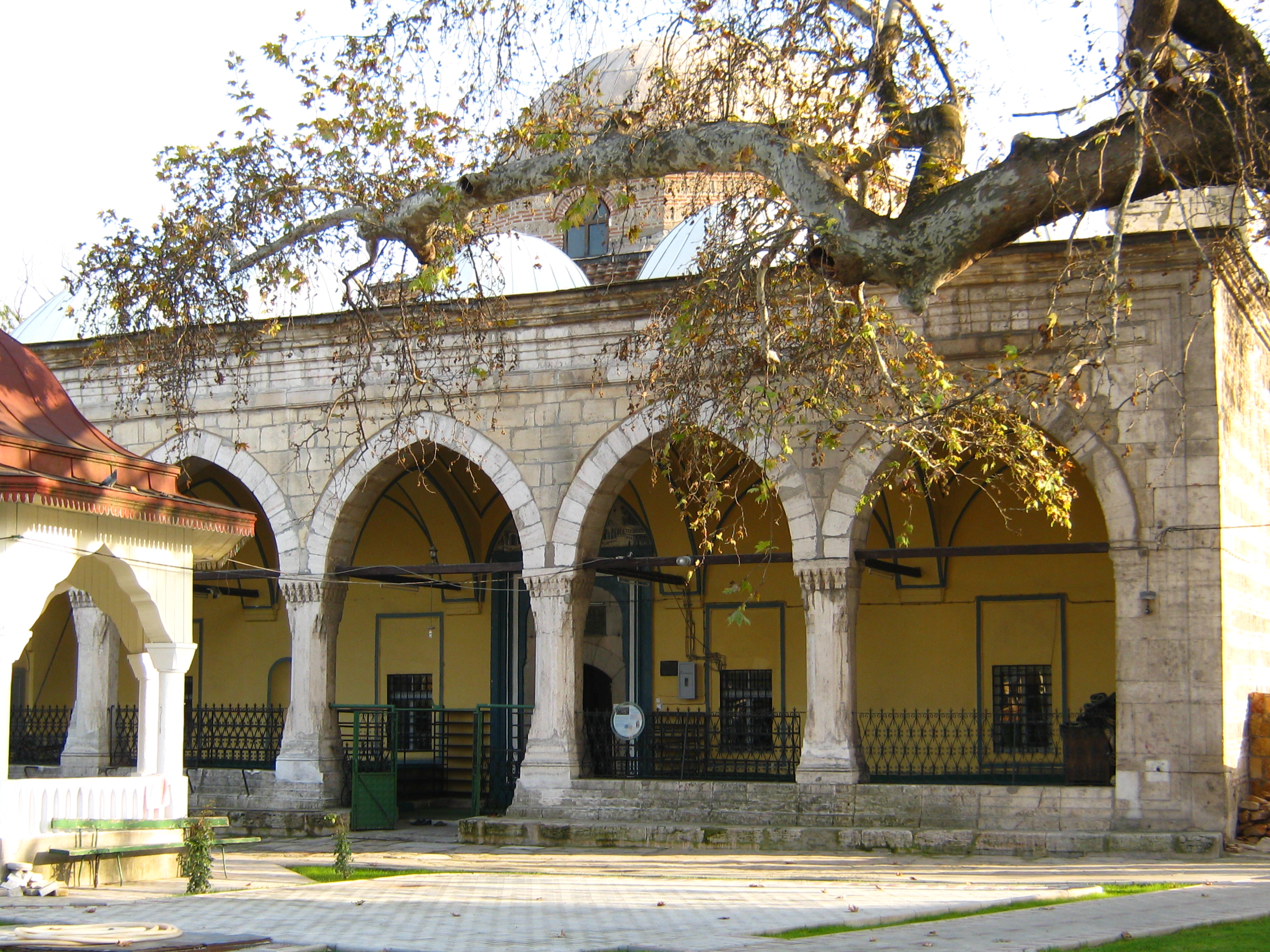
Isa Bey Mosque

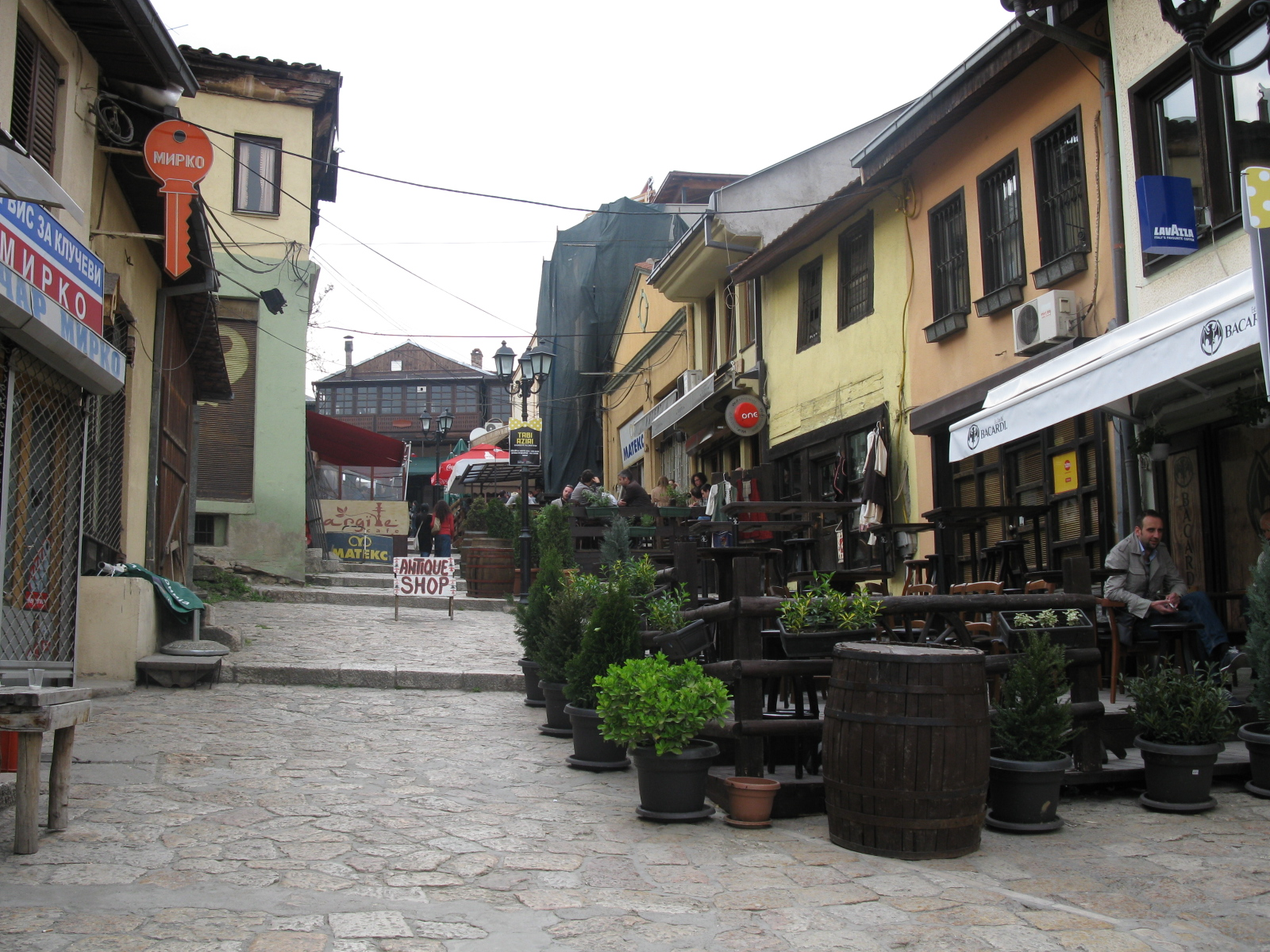
A view from Old Bazaar

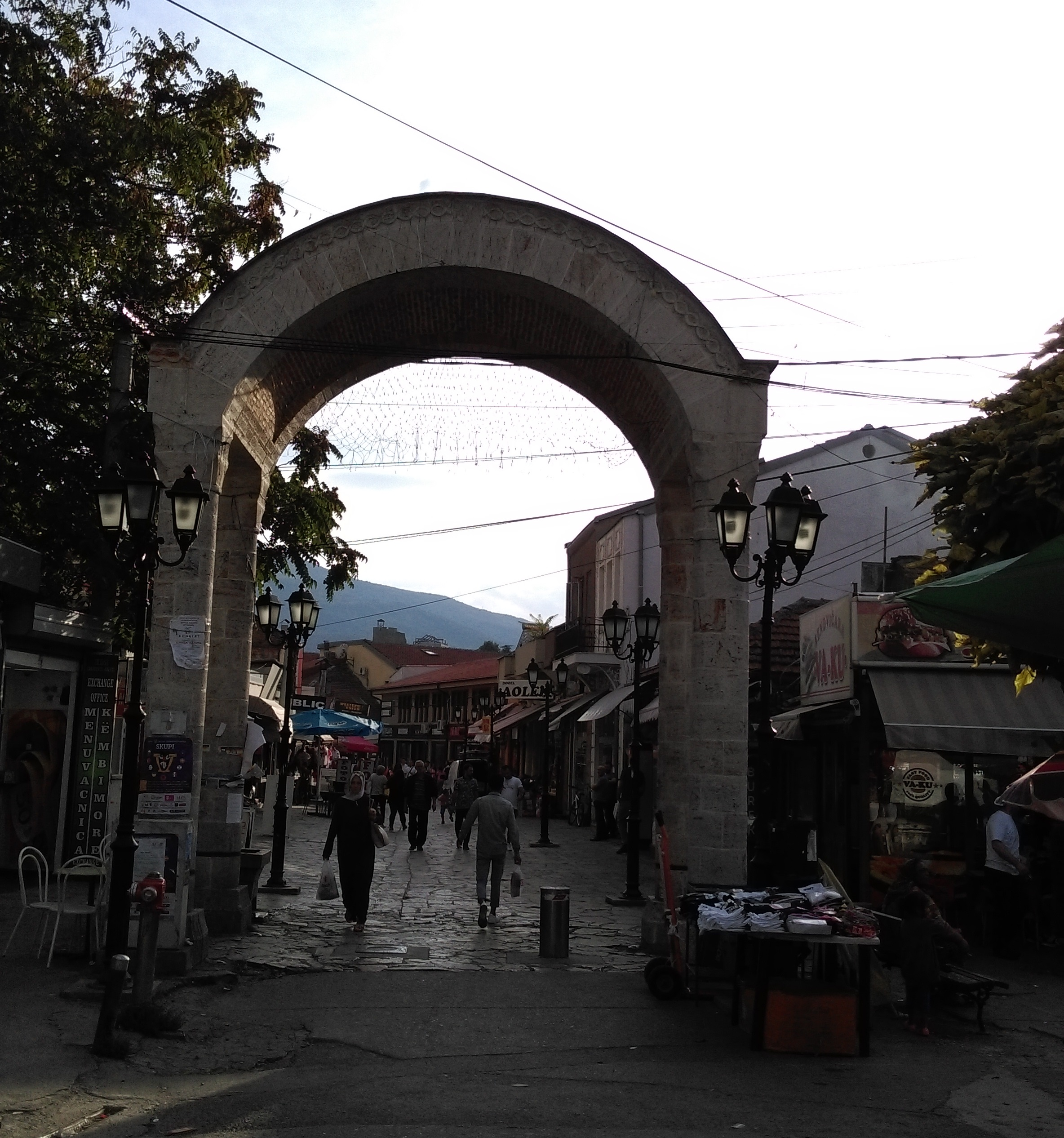
Ottoman Gate, separating the Old Bazaar (north) and Bit Pazar (south)

=== Historical ===
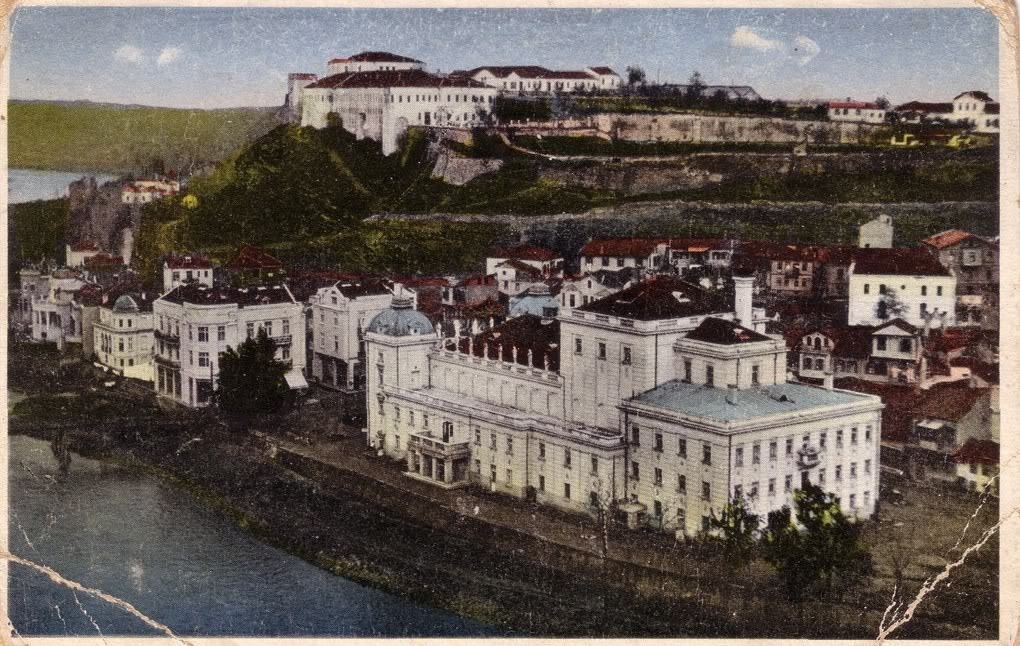
Old town in 1920s

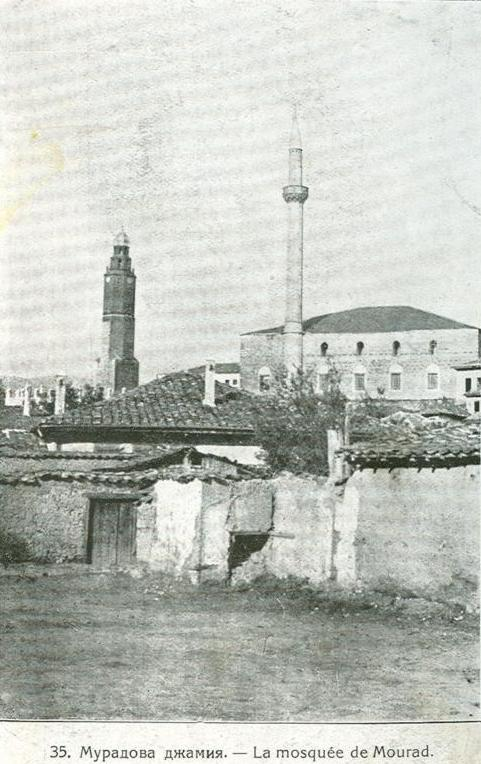
Sultan Murad Mosque

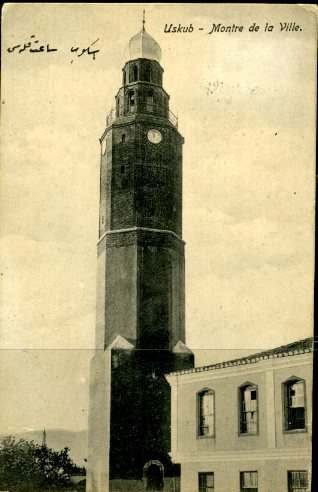
Postcard with clock tower

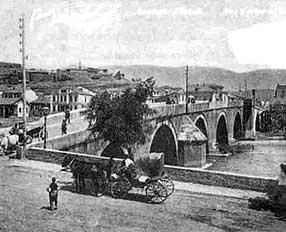
Stone Bridge in 1909

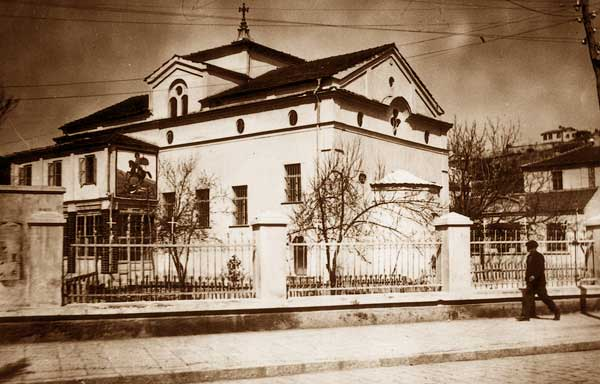
St. Demetrius Church in 1935

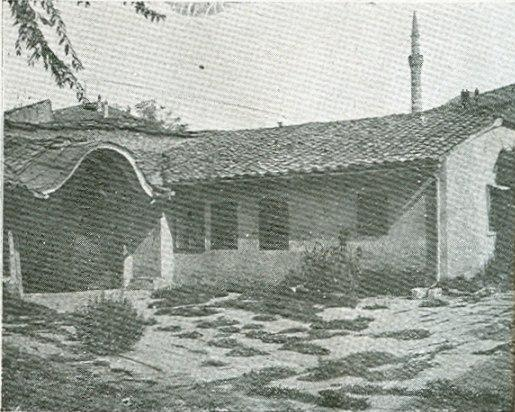
St. Spas Church in the 1920s

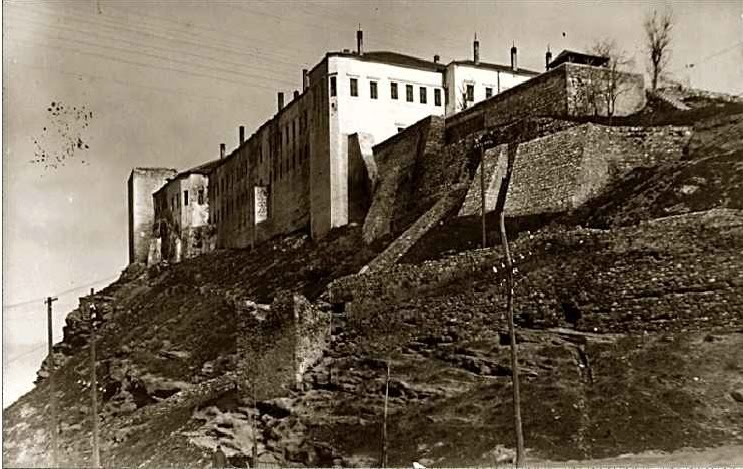
Kale Fortress in the 1920s

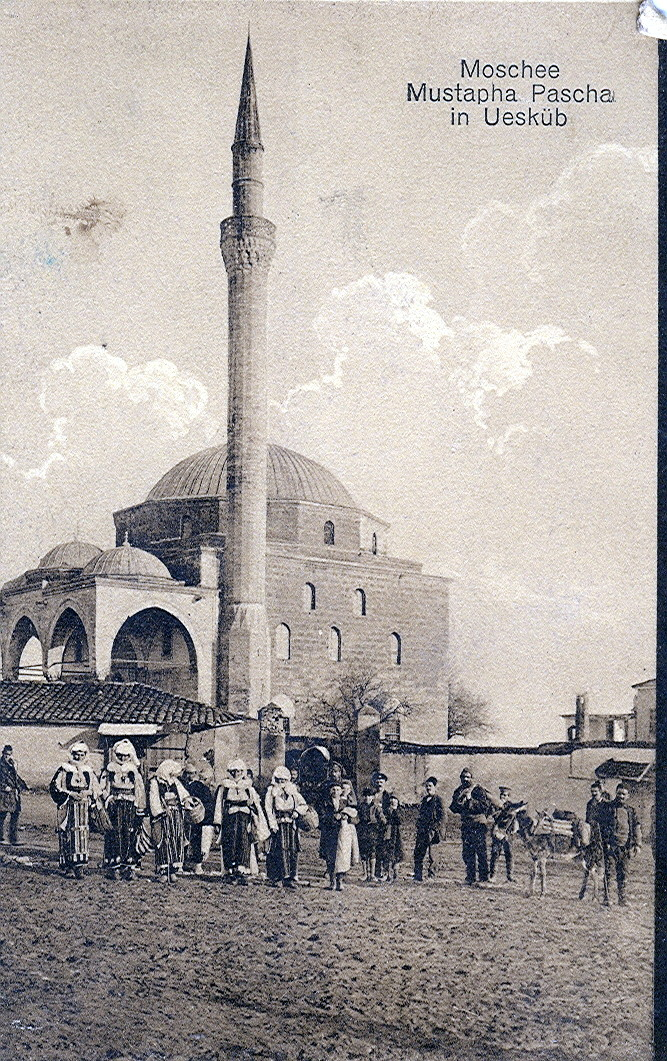
Mustafa Paşa Mosque

== See also ==
- Bazaar
- Economy of North Macedonia
- Market (place)
- Ottoman Vardar Macedonia
- Retail
- Souq
- Bit Pazar Shooting
