= Enea Silvio Piccolomini (general) =

Imperial general

Enea Silvio Piccolomini (German: Johann Norbert Piccolomini; Papal States, c. 1650 – Prizren, Ottoman Empire, 9 November 1689) was a Sienese nobleman whose lineage included two popes, and who served in the Habsburg army of Leopold I, Holy Roman Emperor. He is known for leading a campaign against the Ottomans in Bosnia, Macedonia and Kosovo in 1689, and for setting fire to Skopje, the present day capital of the Republic of North Macedonia.

== Origins ==
Enea Silvio Piccolomini came from the long-established noble family Piccolomini, which included two popes: Pius II (born Enea Silvio Piccolomini) and Pius III (born Francesco Todeschini Piccolomini), as well as the Generalfeldmarschall Ottavio Piccolomini.

== Early career ==
Young nobles left Siena individually and contacted the important Italian lobby in Vienna, hoping to obtain junior positions in some German regiment. In February 1660 Enea Silvio also left Siena to look for a career in Vienna. Enea Silvio's father established him in an apartment in the imperial capital, with a page, two valets, and a groom for his horses, while the youngster sought audiences with the emperor Leopold I, empress, the archduke and important ministers on the credentials of his famous ancestors.

A breakthrough came when he managed to obtain a position in the regiment of the minister Count Rabassa. Enea Silvio's situation, like that of other young German and Italian officers, was precarious. When the emperor dissolved some of his regiments in October 1660, he narrowly escaped complete unemployment and was happy to be a simple comet in his patron's cavalry regiment.

In 1675 Enea Silvio was a lieutenant-colonel on a campaign. He describes some desperate and bloody engagements he fought against the French in the Rhineland under Montecuccoli.

Although his court patron, the empress Claudia Felicitas of Austria died in 1676, he gained sudden popularity with the court. In January 1677, he describes himself as being feted by the emperor and all the ministers in Vienna, appearing to have as many friends at court as if he had never left it. The last letter, from November 1681, shows him negotiating through the Dowager Empress Leonora for the positions of pages for his nephews; for him, they represented two more Piccolomini and Sienese in Germany.

== Campaign in the Balkans ==
After the siege of Vienna (1683), emperor Leopold I mounted a series of campaigns against the Ottomans (see: Great Turkish War), to capture territories of the Balkans.

During the Battle of Mohács (1687) Enea Silvio Piccolomini, now a lieutenant-general under the command of Charles V, proved victorious against the Ottoman cavalry.

In 1689 one of the Austrian campaigns was led by Piccolomini. He led an army into Kosovo, where it was welcomed by Catholic Archbishop Pjetër Bogdani. Piccolomini's army was largely made up of ethnic Albanians, amassing some 20,000 under his orders.

He attempted to conquer the Ottoman territories of Kosovo, Bosnia and Macedonia. During the offensive, the city of Skopje, the present-day capital of the Republic of Macedonia, was plagued by epidemics of cholera. To prevent the outburst of the disease, or, by other accounts, to retaliate for the siege of Vienna, General Piccolomini ordered the city to be burned (see Fire of Skopje). He perished of the plague himself in Prizren on 9th of November 1689. He was buried in the main church of the city, in a ceremony conducted by Bogdani, who was then Archbishop of Skopje. After Piccolomini's death, leaderless, his army was defeated. Many of the Serbs fled into exile, led by the Patriarch Arsenije III Crnojević.

== See also ==
- Piccolomini
- Great Turkish War
- Holy League (1684)
- Jovan Monasterlija
