= Reconstruction of Skopje 1963 =

Reconstruction of Skopje, Urban master plan of Skopje 1963

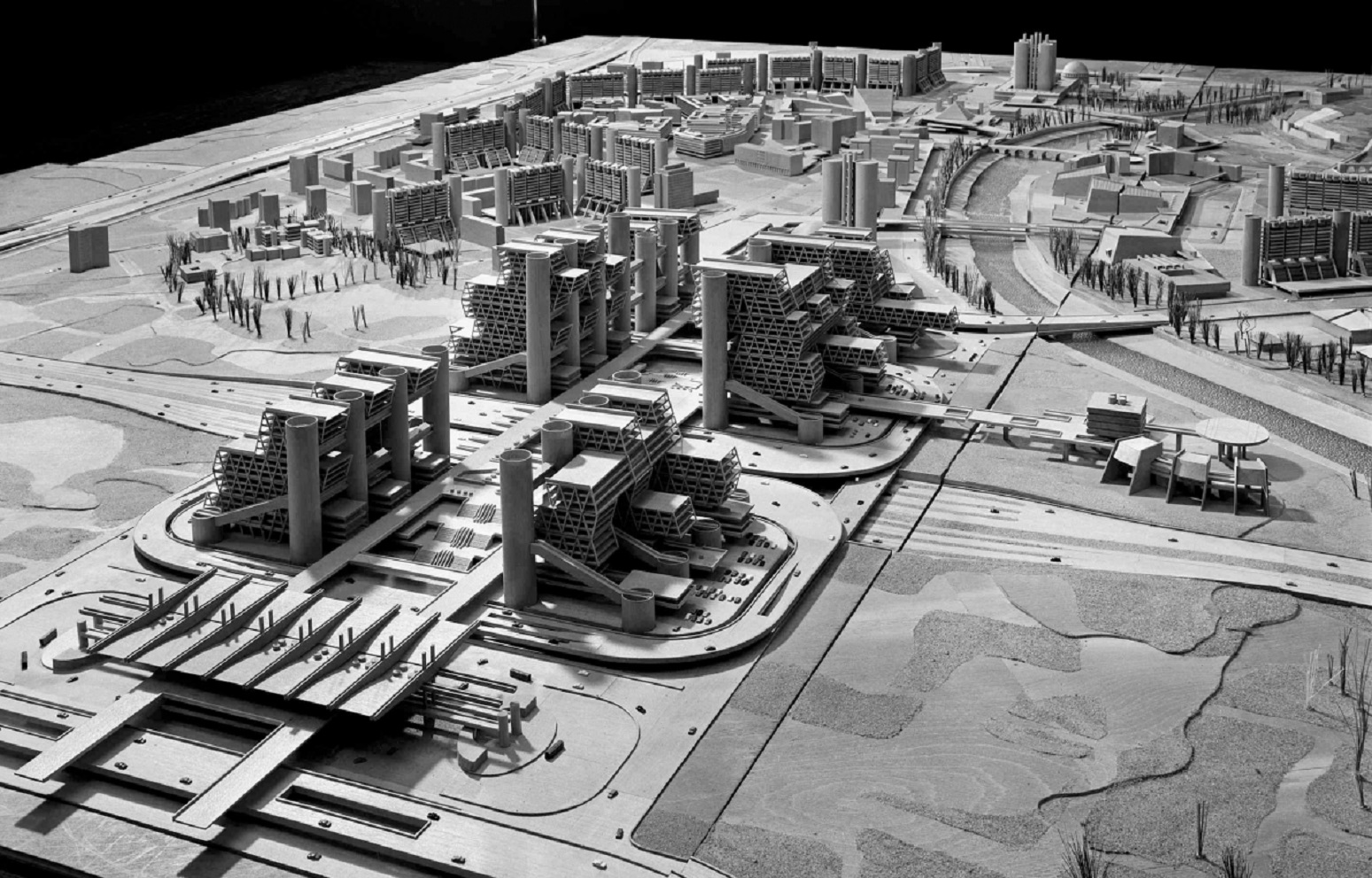
- Urban and architectural master plan for Skopje City 1963 by Kenzo Tange
- Interactive map of Reconstruction of Skopje 1963
- Other names: Plan of Skopje, Reconstruction of Skopje, Skopje Master Plan
- Location: Skopje, Macedonia, Yugoslavia
- Coordinates: 41.9981°N 21.4254°E
- Proposed: 1963

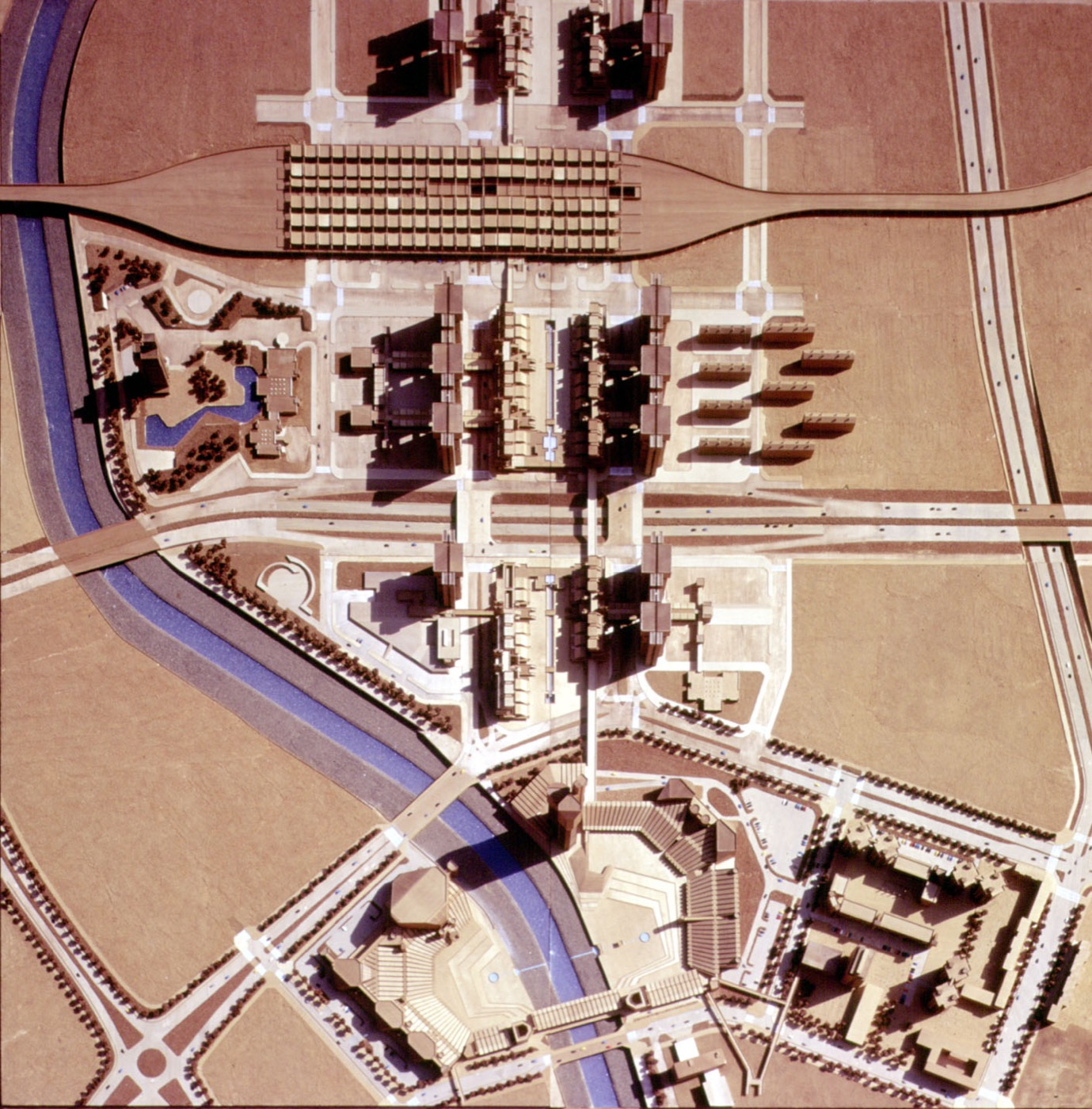
Skopje City Master Plan 0033 01

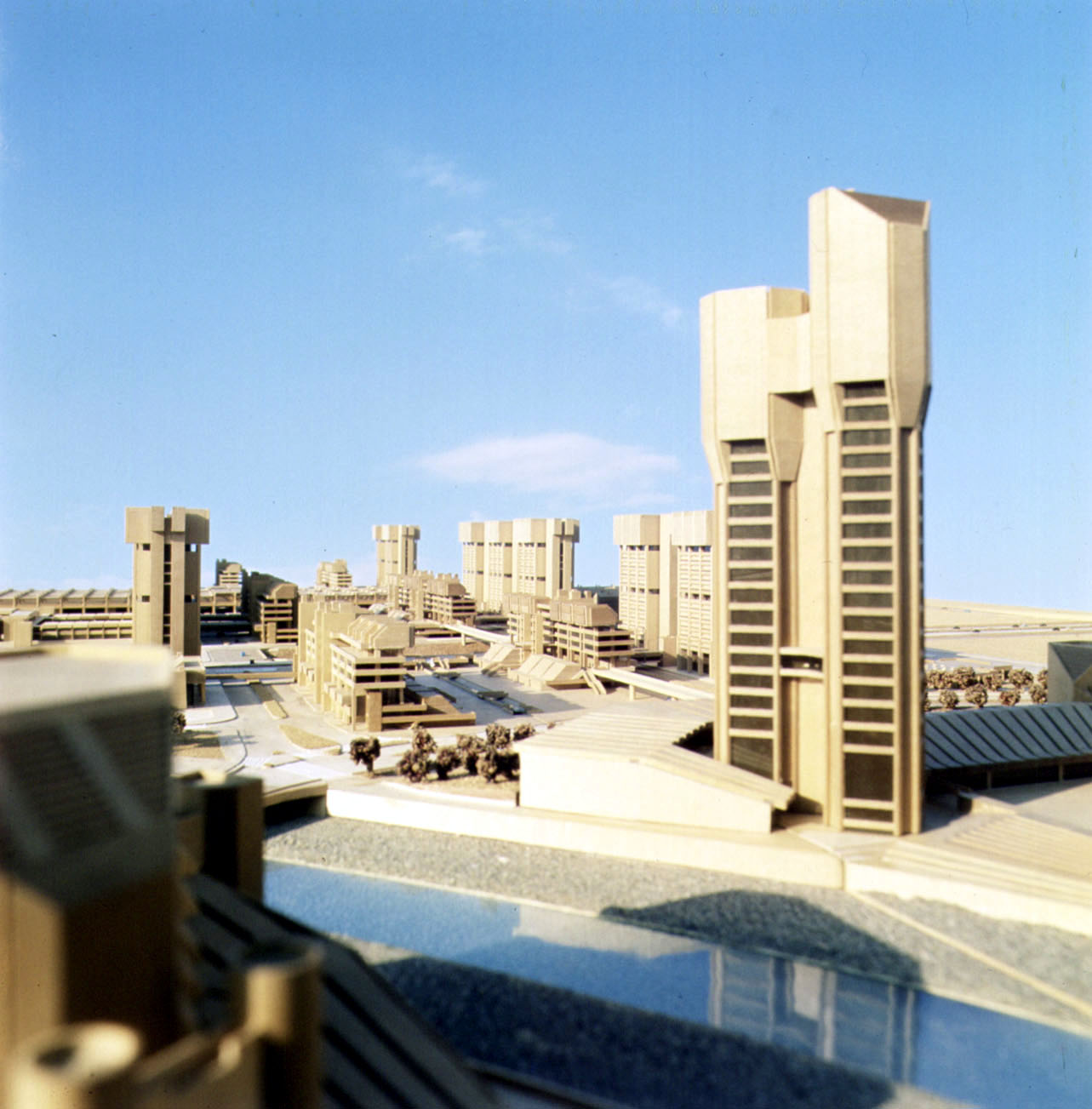
Skopje Cite Master Plan 0033 02

Plan for Skopje 1963 was the urban and architectural plan put forward to rebuild the city of Skopje following the 1963 Skopje earthquake. The plan was organised between 1963 and 1966 by the government of Yugoslavia and the United Nations. The rebuilding of the city attracted large international attention, this led to the involvement of a large number of high-profile architects. The UN invited Kenzo Tange and his team to participate in an international competition for the urban design of the city centre in 1965; as one of several Yugoslav and international architecture teams. Architects that participated in the plan include Constantinos Doxiadis and Adolf Ciborowski.Jo van den Broek and Jaap Bakema. Luigi Piccinato and Maurice Rotival. Yugoslav participants included Aleksandar Dordevik, Slavko Brezoski, Edvard Ravnikar, Radovan Miščević and Fedor Wenzler.

The plan is unique in its architectural focus involving Metabolism, Brutalism and Architecture of Yugoslavia on a total scale, culturally relevant due to the international attention and collaboration backed by the UN and a rare example of Cold War unity between the superpowers of the 20th century.

The architectural plan has been revisited, theorised and discussed due to its impact on Brutalist architecture and art history of the 20th century. The impact of the plan affected the urban, historical and cultural direction of society. The implementation of the reconstruction of Skopje is a historically unique instance of UN international collaboration. It is also the first examples of Japanese architects implementing metabolist theory and modern architecture methods on a metropolis scale urban project outside of Japan.

== Planning ==
The reconstruction plan of central Skopje was won by Tange's team in 1965. The project was significant not only because of its international influence, but also because it realised a new international model for urban reconstruction.

Earnest Weissman, a student of Le Corbusier and head of planning at UN Social Affairs consolidated and supervised the organisation of Skopje's reconstruction from the beginning.

Maurice Rotival a UN expert on Urban planning famously stated: "The world now expects that the New Skopje will become a model city, built not for the present but for the future. Any less eloquent result of the work done by the Leadership of the United Nation... will tell that a great opportunity was wasted. For the world's sake, Skopje has to be not just a city to live in but also a monument to the hope of a better world."

Tange planned for two symbolic centers based on a City Wall and City Gate, symbolic in nature, providing a living and transit hub respectively.

== Outcomes ==
The reconstruction led to the realisation of a number of modernist buildings:

- Johann Heinrich Pestalozzi Elementary School [1967-1969] funded by Switzerland and designed by

Alfred Roth[13]

- Museum of Contemporary Art [1969-1970] funded by Poland and designed by Jerzy Mokrzyński, Eugeniusz Wierzbicki and Wacław Kłyszewski.
- Military Hospital [1969-1971] by Josip Osoynik and Slobodan Nikolić, architects of Military Medical Academy
- University Campus [1970-1974] by Marko Mušič
- Cultural Centre [1968-unfinished] by Biro 71
- Macedonian Academy of Sciences and Arts by Boris Čipan
- City Commercial Centre [1981-1983] by Živko Popovski learned from Van den Broek and Jaap Bakema
- Post office, a brutalist masterpiece by Janko Konstantinov
- Goce Delčev Student Dormatory by Giorgi Konstantinovski
- City Archives, Skopje by Giorgi Konstantinovski
- State Hydro-meteorological Institute [1972-1975] by Krsto Todorovski

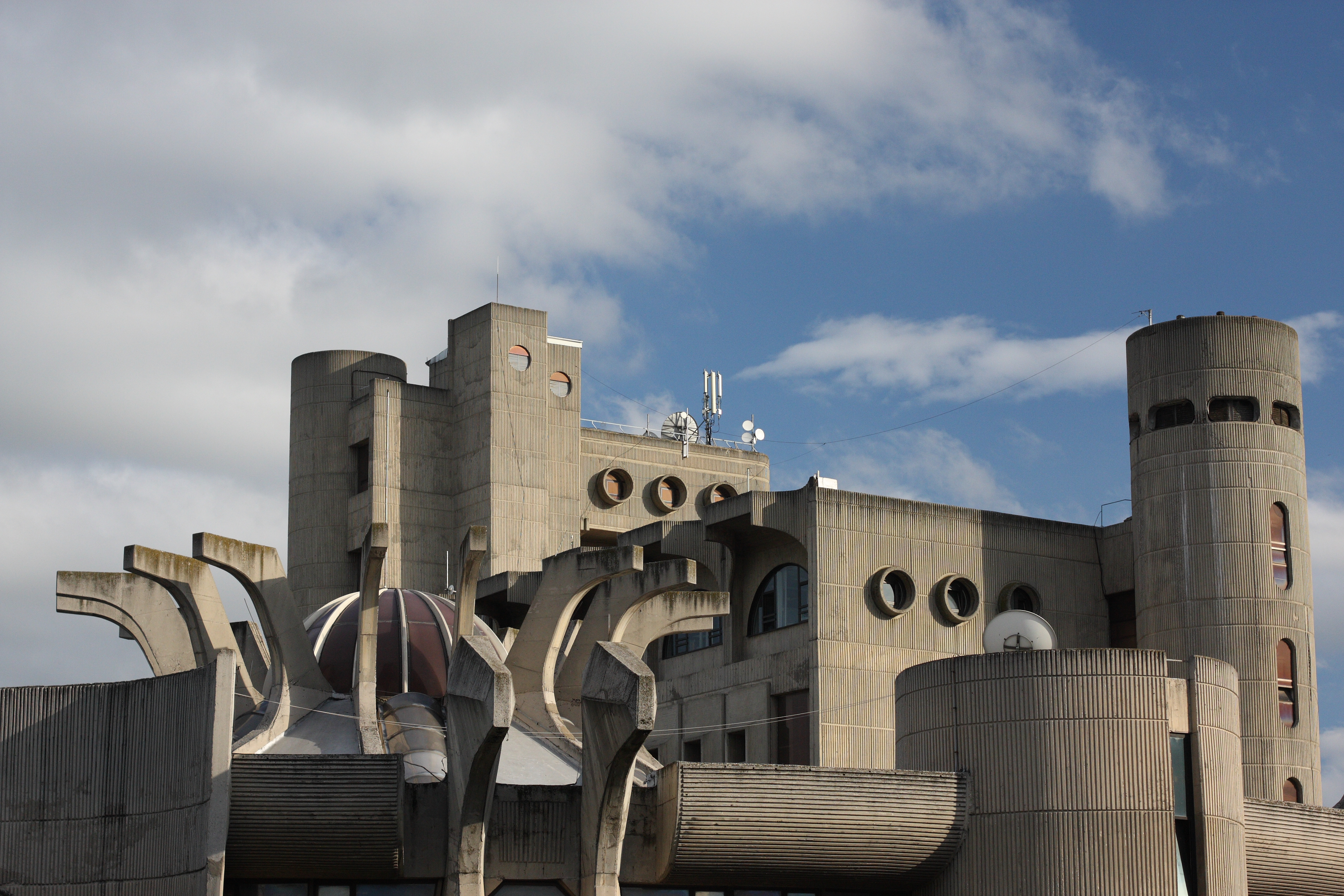
Post Office Skopje

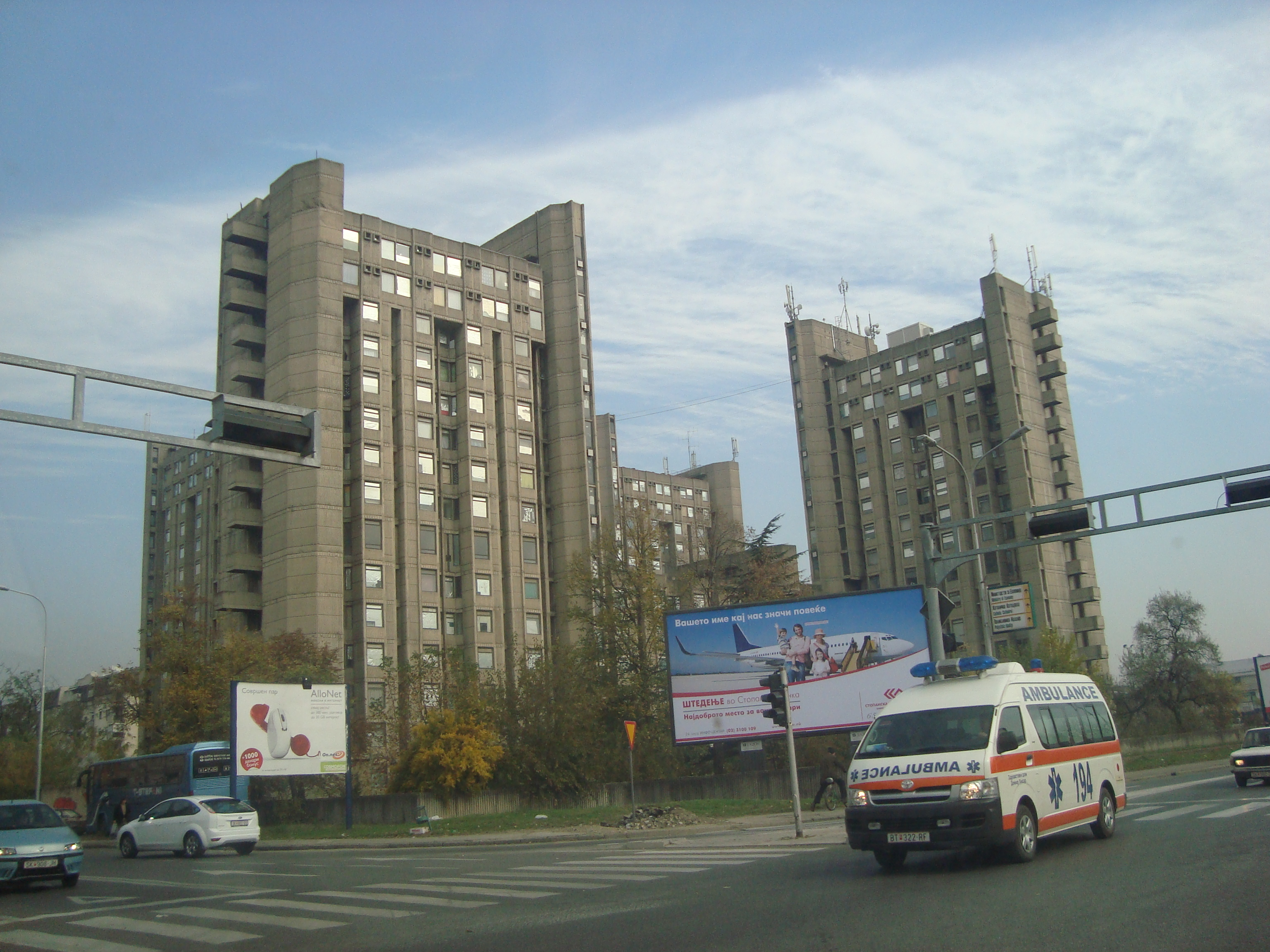
Students' dormitory Goce Delčev

Maintenance and support for these buildings waned after the fall of Yugoslavia, and the Skopje 2014 reconstruction has replaced much of the architecture of this period.
