= Živko Popovski =

Macedonian architect (1934–2007)

Živko Popovski (alternative spellings: Zivko, Zhivko, 1934–2007) was the most prominent Macedonian architect after the Second World War. He was a professor at the Architectural Faculty in Skopje. He worked with Dutch architects and CIAM alumni Jo_van_den_Broek and Jaap Bakema. His most famous works are the Skopje Shopping Center (GTC), Pensioner's Home in Ohrid, and the reconstructed Culture Center "Grigor Prlichev" in Ohrid.

The City Commercial Center Building(known as by the acronym GTC), also known as the Skopje Shopping centre, connects the two core aspects of Kenzo Tange's earthquake reconstruction Plan for Skopje): the City Gate and the City Wall. The building is both Modernist and Brutalist, while simultaneously encapsulating the idea of a traditional city bazar.
