= Janko Konstantinov =

Janko Konstantinov (Macedonian: Јанко Константинов; 18 January 1926 in Bitola, Kingdom of Serbs, Croats and Slovenes – 2010) is a Macedonian architect and artist.

== Education and career ==
Janko Konstantinov studied at Faculty of Architecture in Belgrade under famous designers and educators such as: Alexander Deroko, Milan Zlokovikj, Mate Bajlon, and Nicholas Dobrovikj. He graduated in 1952. Then in 1954, he went on to specialize in his field at the Royal Danish Academy of Art and Architecture in Copenhagen. Konstantinov gained experience working on projects in Finland, where he worked with the legendary Finnish architect Alvar Aalto, Sweden and the USA.

From 1958 to 1964, worked as a designer in the studio of designer Victor Gruen. He also worked in the studio Daniel Johnson Medehal Los Angeles, the United States. After the tragic events of the 1963 earthquake, Konstantinov returned to Skopje to help rebuild the city. His Telecommunications Centre and Post Office (built in different stages between 1974 and 1989) are two of his most recognizable contributions to the rebuild of Skopje.

He worked in Bitola in the studio of the famous Russian painter Ivan Meljnikov. Janko Konstantinov was inspired by the beauty of his country, and his common motifs were landscapes of Ohrid. In 2009, Konstantinov donated 108 of his paintings, mostly watercolors, to the Institute and Museum of Bitola. In 2006, The Art Gallery of the Macedonian Academy of Sciences and Arts, held an exhibition of his work.

== Architectural works ==
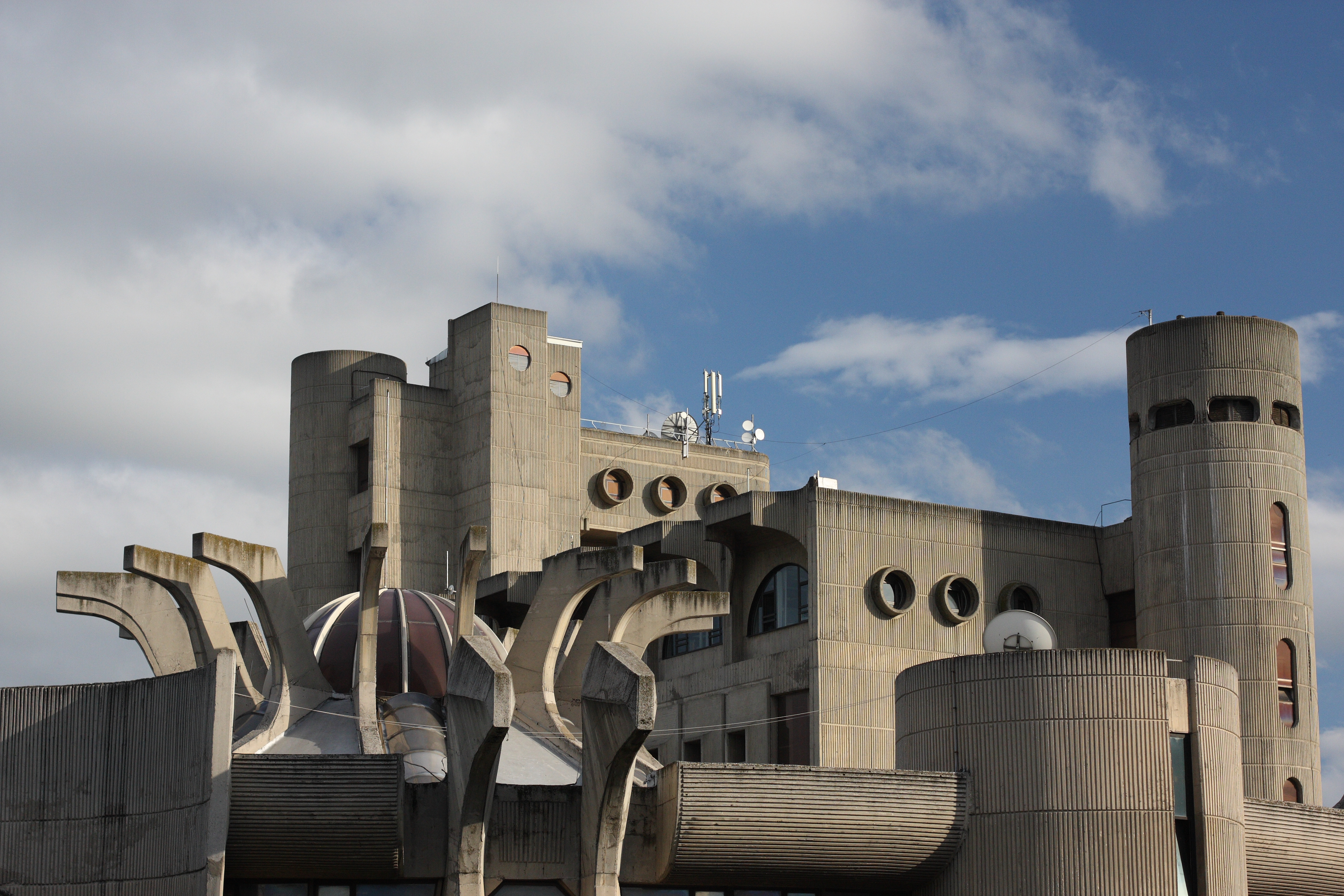
Main Post Office, Skopje, 1974

His architectural works include:

- From 1955 to 1958 he was the architect for the Swedish capital of Stockholm, the Bureaus of S.Tregord, N.. Kehinger and G.Letstorm. He was responsible for designing the Helsingorden school, a school in Falun, a technical high school in Stockholm, administration and the commercial center and residential in the neighborhood of Helsingorden.
- A museum in the city Olborg in Denmark,1958
- A covered swimming pool in Los Angeles, 1960-1962
- The Science Center Southern California, 1962 to 1965
- The Seismological Station Valandovo, 1965
- The "Youth House, seven secretaries of SKOJ" in Zagreb
- The Skopje City Hall, 1982
- A Shopping Centre in Skopje
- The monument of the Ilinden KRU
- Optical in Skopje
- An administrative building of GP Pelagonia shaped bank in Tehran
- A multipurpose tower in Kuwait
- A villa in Greece villa in Thessaloniki
- The Pedagogical High School "Nikola Karev" in Skopje, 1965-1968
- The Medical Center in Skopje 1968-1970
- The PTT Telecommunications Center in Skopje,1972-1974 and 1979-1980
- The hotel "Aleksandar Palace"
- The "You Mobile" MK in complex Macedonian Telecommunications
- The "Magic Design Center" in Skopje

== Awards ==
Architect Konstantinov holds numerous awards:

fighting plaque architecture in Macedonia in 1969 Pedagogical High School "Nikola Karev" in Skopje,

fighting plaque architecture in Macedonia the 1975 Telecommunications Center in Skopje,

October 11 award of SR Macedonia for architecture in 1975 Telecommunications Center in Skopje,
