= Museum of Contemporary Art (Skopje) =

Coordinates: 42°00′14″N 21°25′58″E

- Музеј на современата уметност (Macedonian); Muzeu i Artit Bashkëkohor (Albanian)
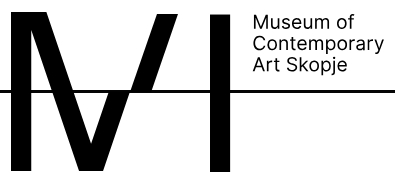

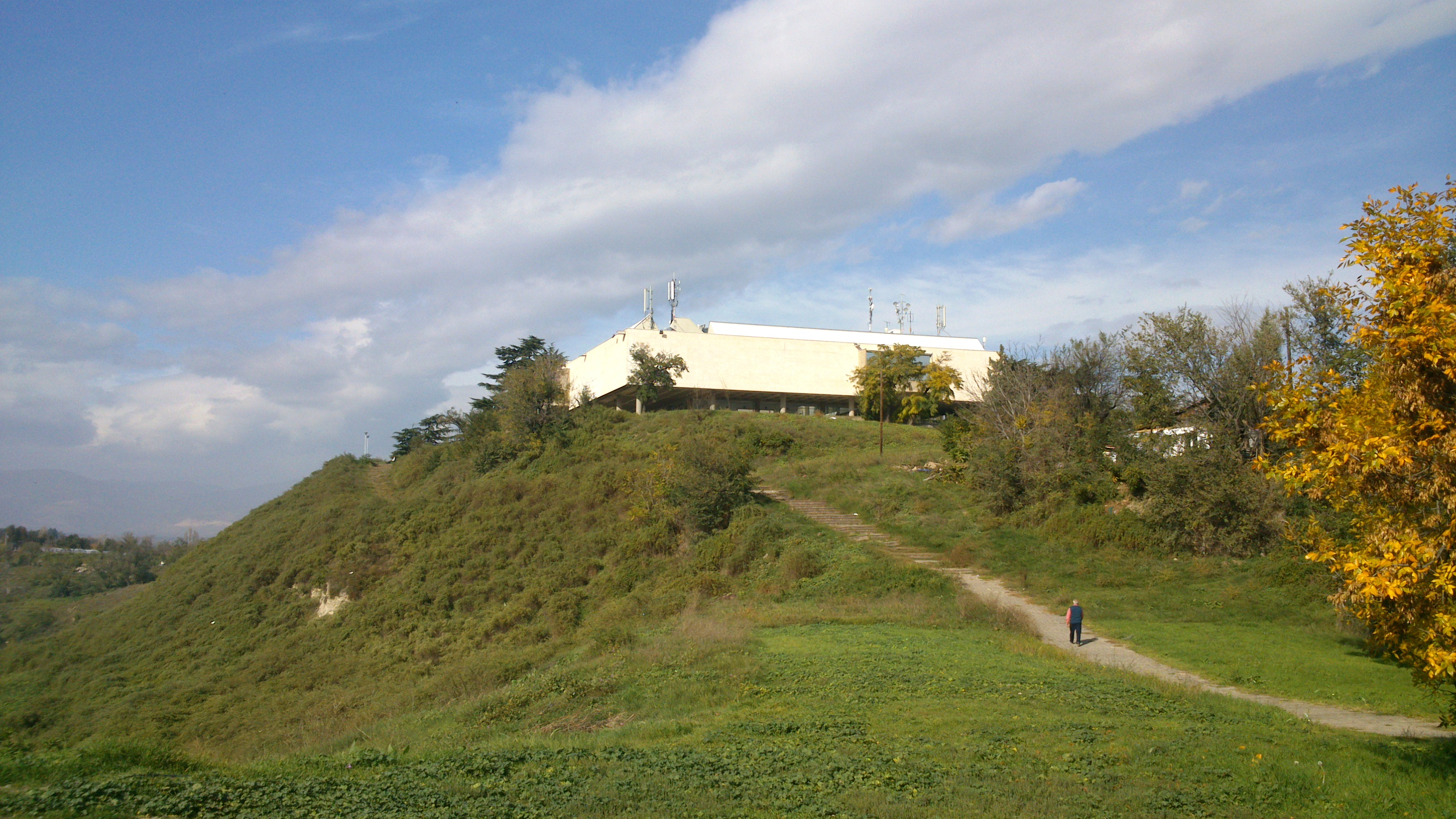
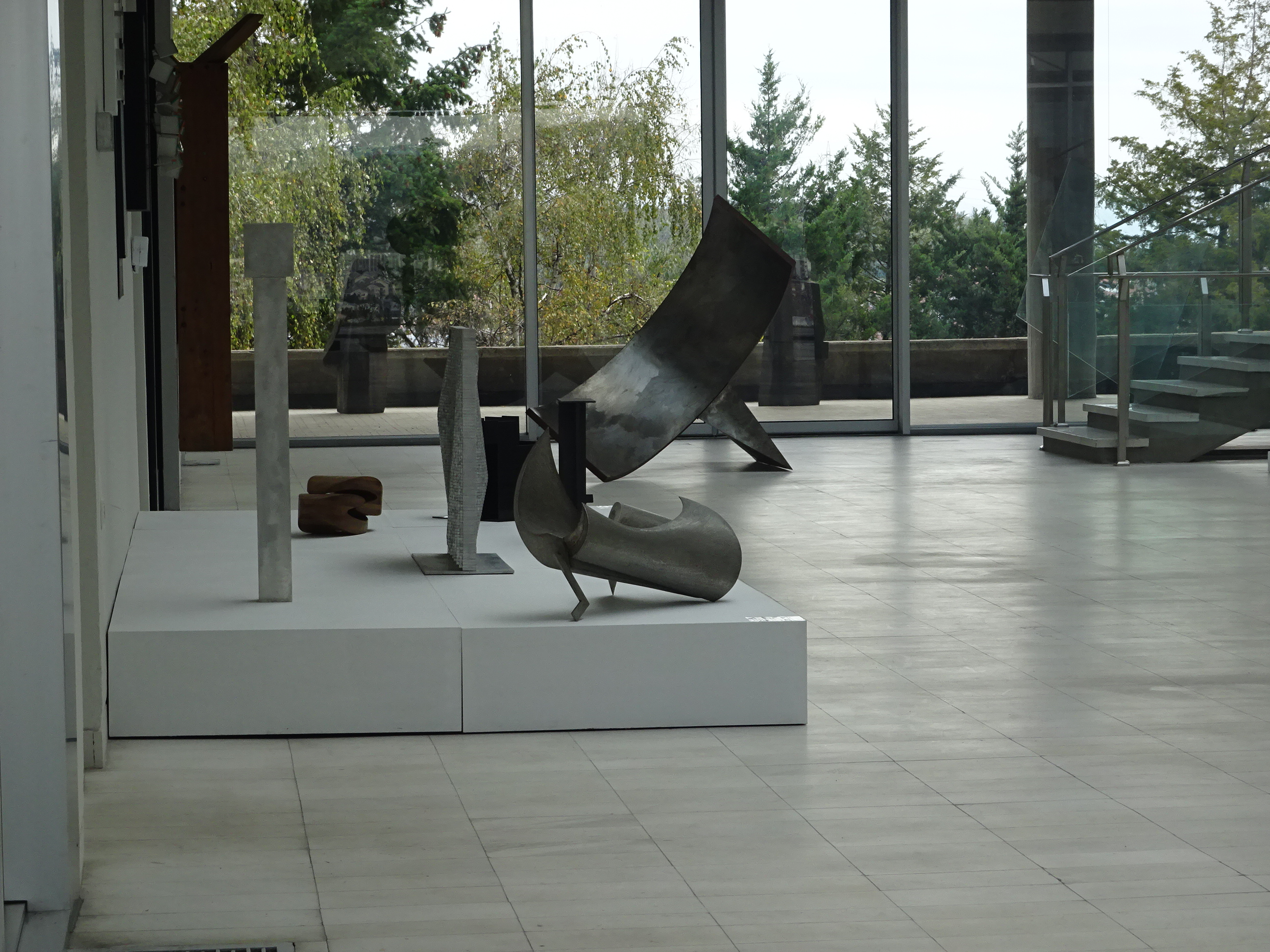
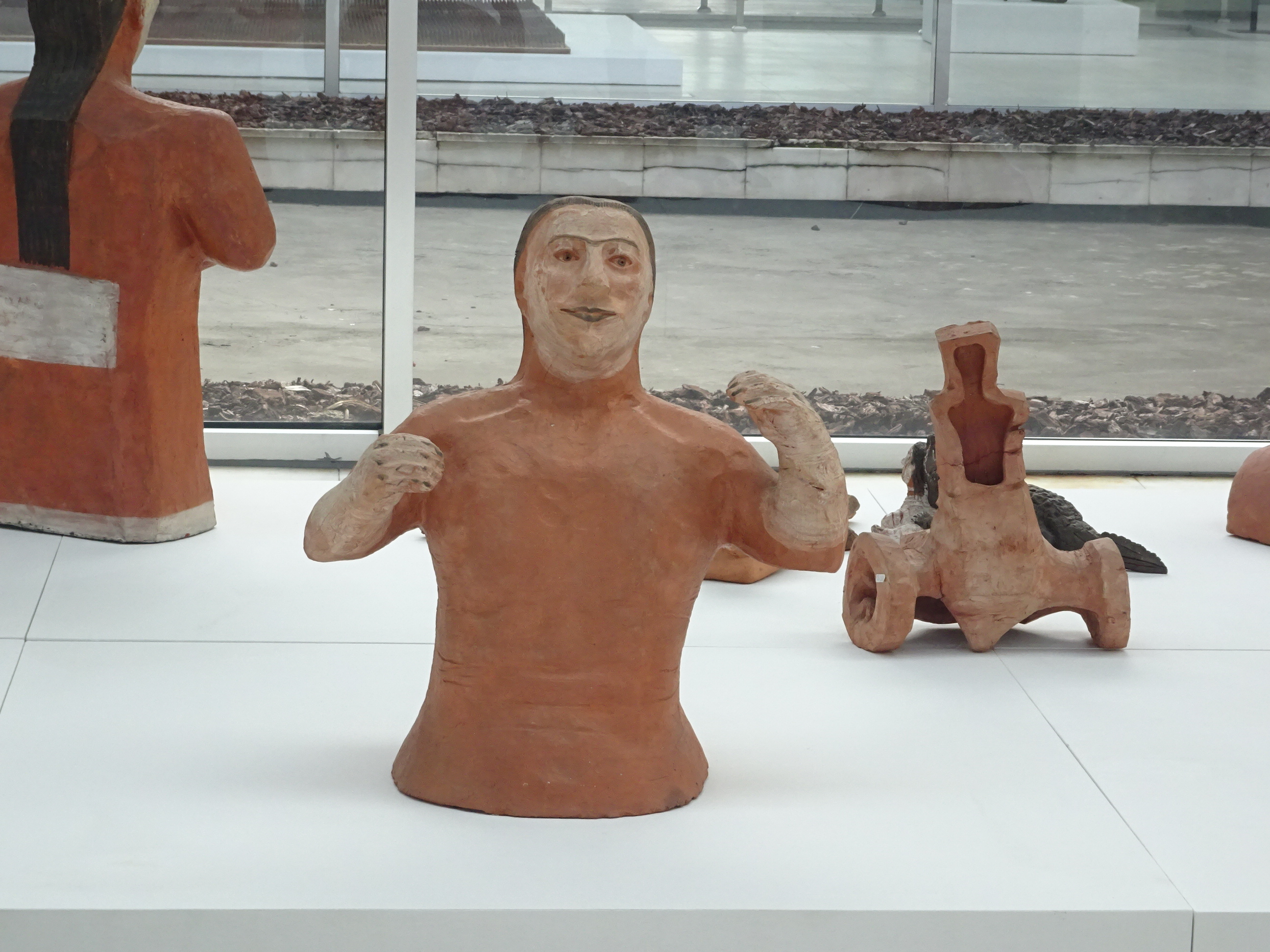
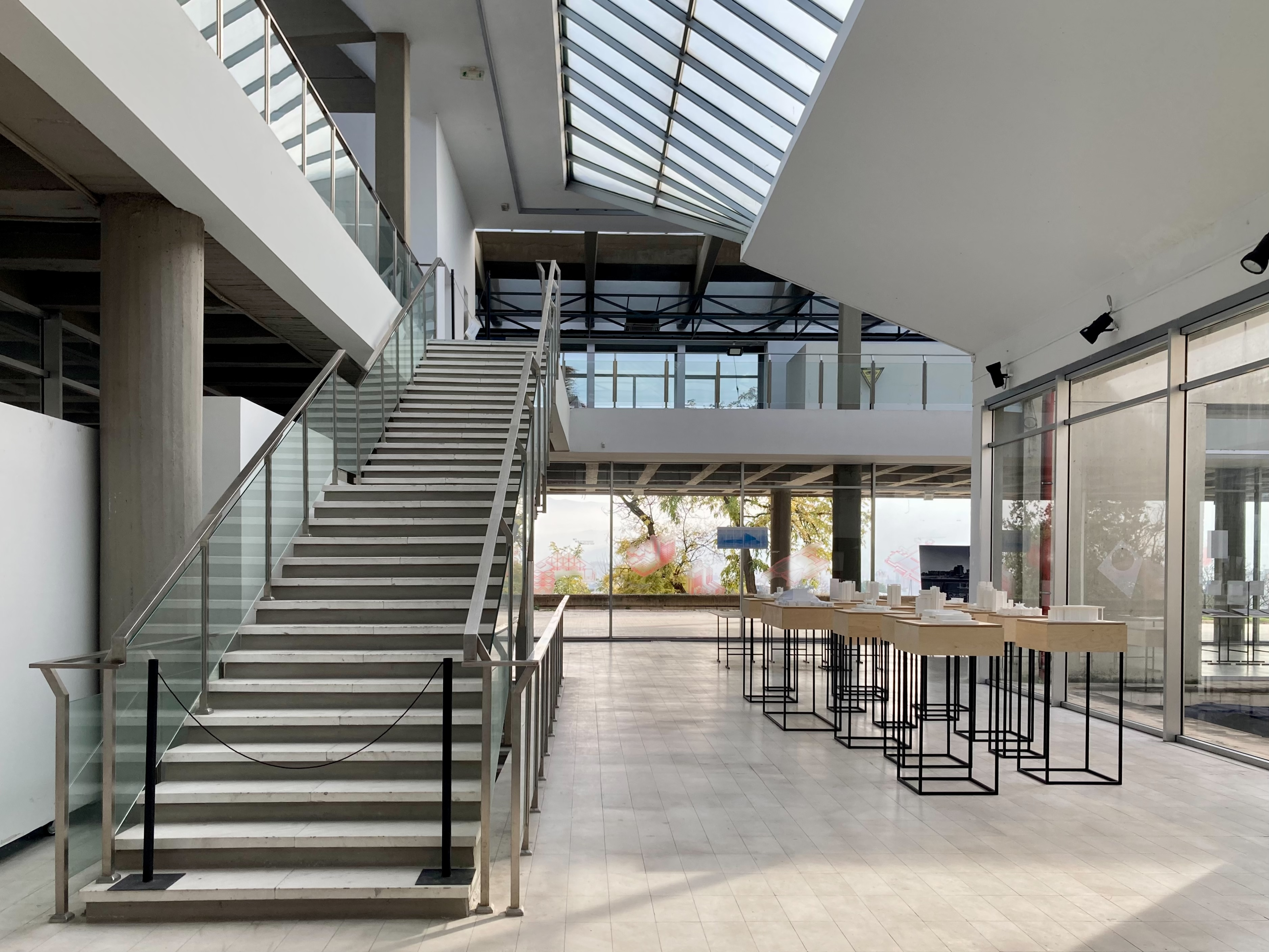
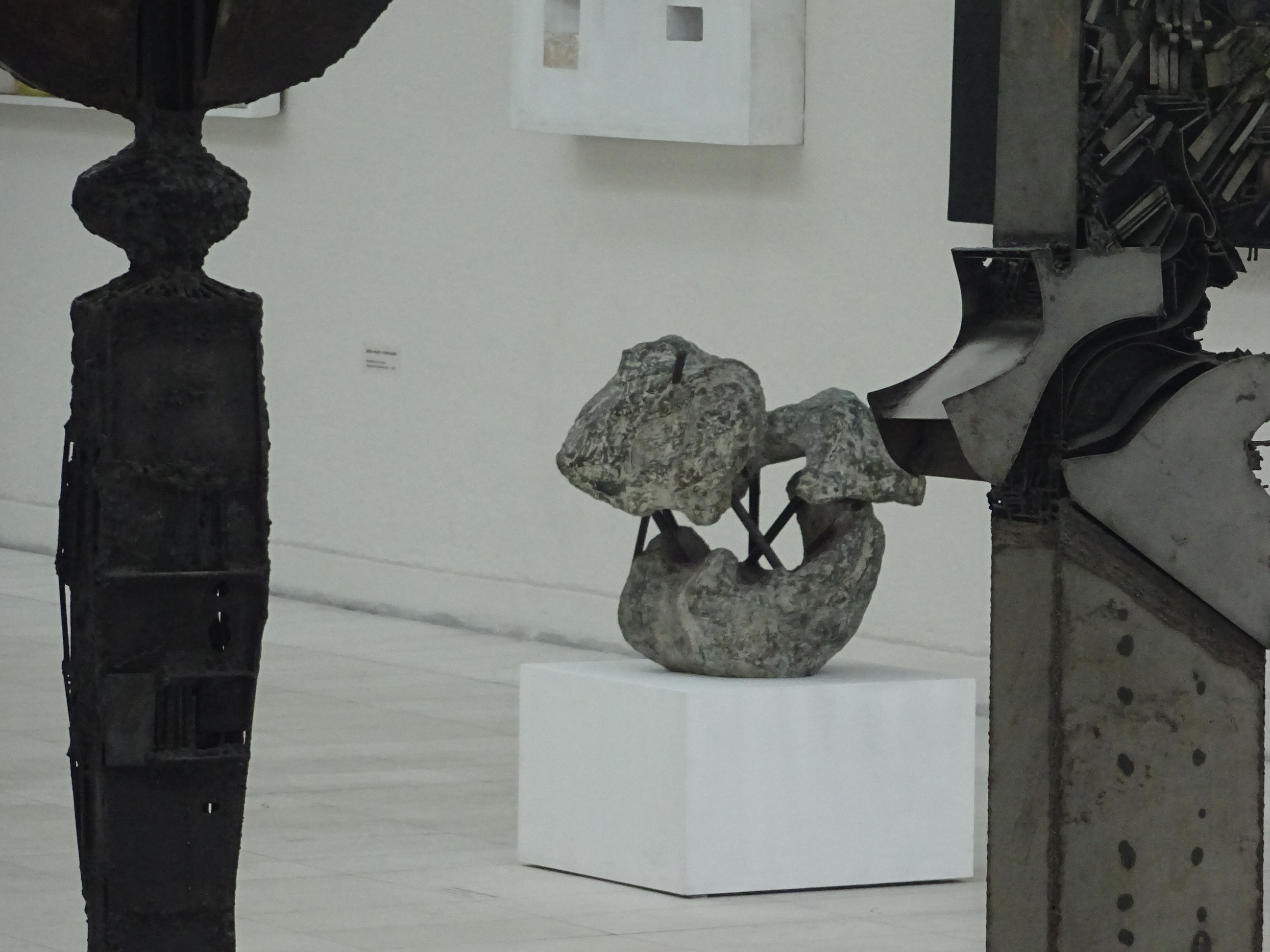
- The main building
- Established: 1964; 62 years ago
- Location: Skopje, North Macedonia
- Type: Contemporary art museum
- Founder: Socialist Republic of Macedonia
- Website: msu.mk

The Contemporary Art Museum (Macedonian: Музеј на современата уметност, romanized: Muzej na sovremenata umetnost, Albanian: Muzeu i Artit Bashkëkohor) is a contemporary art museum located in Skopje, North Macedonia. It is the biggest and most modern museum in the country. The museum was founded in 1963 following the disastrous earthquake that hit the city. Donated by the Polish Government, the museum was designed by the Polish architectural group "Tigers," who won a 1966 competition among over 80 entries. The building became one of the symbols of post-earthquake international solidarity efforts in the reconstruction of Skopje.

== Collection ==
The collection is made up of two segments; international and national. The international segment of the collections reflects the modern art from almost all parts of the world. The larger part of the collection marks the art movements of the 1950s, 1960s and 1970s, although it contains also around a hundred works of the early modern art. The older exhibits are mainly highlighted by works of Emil Filla, Fernand Léger, and André Masson. The works of the internationally well-known artists are of special importance, such as Pablo Picasso, Hans Hartung, Victor Vasarely, Alexander Calder, Pierre Soulages, Alberto Burri, Christo, Tadeusz Kantor, Robert Jacobsen, Etienne Hajdu, Zoltan Kemeny, Jerzy Nowosielski, Robert Adams, Emilio Vedova, Jan Cybis, Antoni Clavé, and Georg Baselitz.

== History ==
The museum was established in 1964, following the receipt of numerous art donations from artists and institutions around the world to the city of Skopje which was devastated in the earthquake in 1963. Under the slogan "Solidarity with Skopje," 35 countries, alongside the United Nations, donated artworks from renowned global artists.

== Building ==
Located near the Skopje medieval fortress, the museum is an example of late modernist architecture and symbolizes the city's renewal after the 1963 earthquake. The building, covering 5,000 sq. m., was designed by Polish architects J. Mokrzynski, E. Wierzbicki, and W. Klyzewski and donated by the Government of the Polish People's Republic. The museum features three interconnected wings, offering 3,000 sq. m. of exhibition space, a 120-seat cinema, a library, archives, conservation facilities, and visitor amenities like a shop and café.
