= Adolf Ciborowski =

Polish architect, urban planner and politician

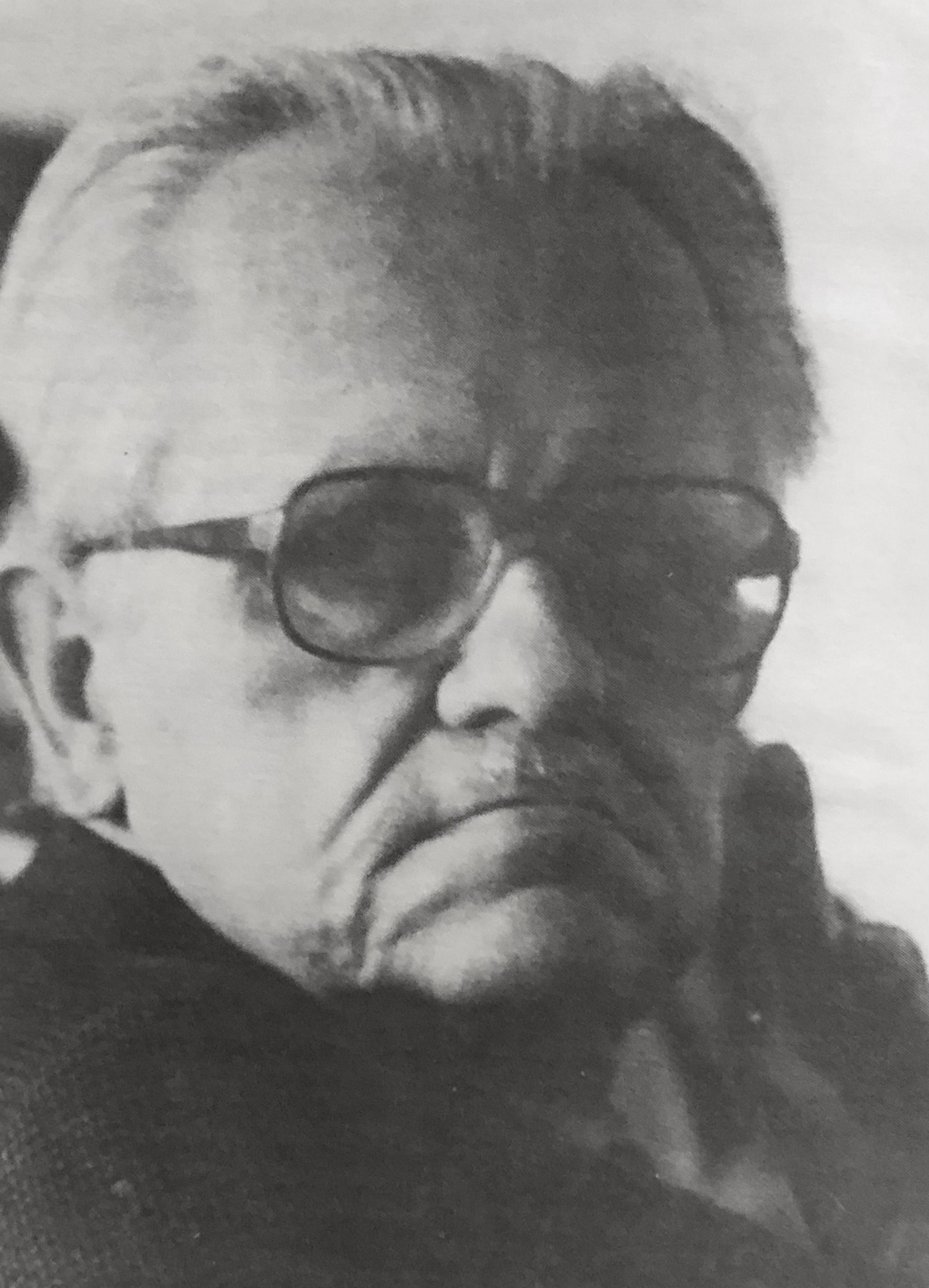
- Ciborowski in 1985
- Born: 25 May 1919; Warsaw, Second Polish Republic
- Died: 26 January 1987 (aged 67); Warsaw, Polish People's Republic
- Occupation: architect
- Practice: Warsaw University of Technology

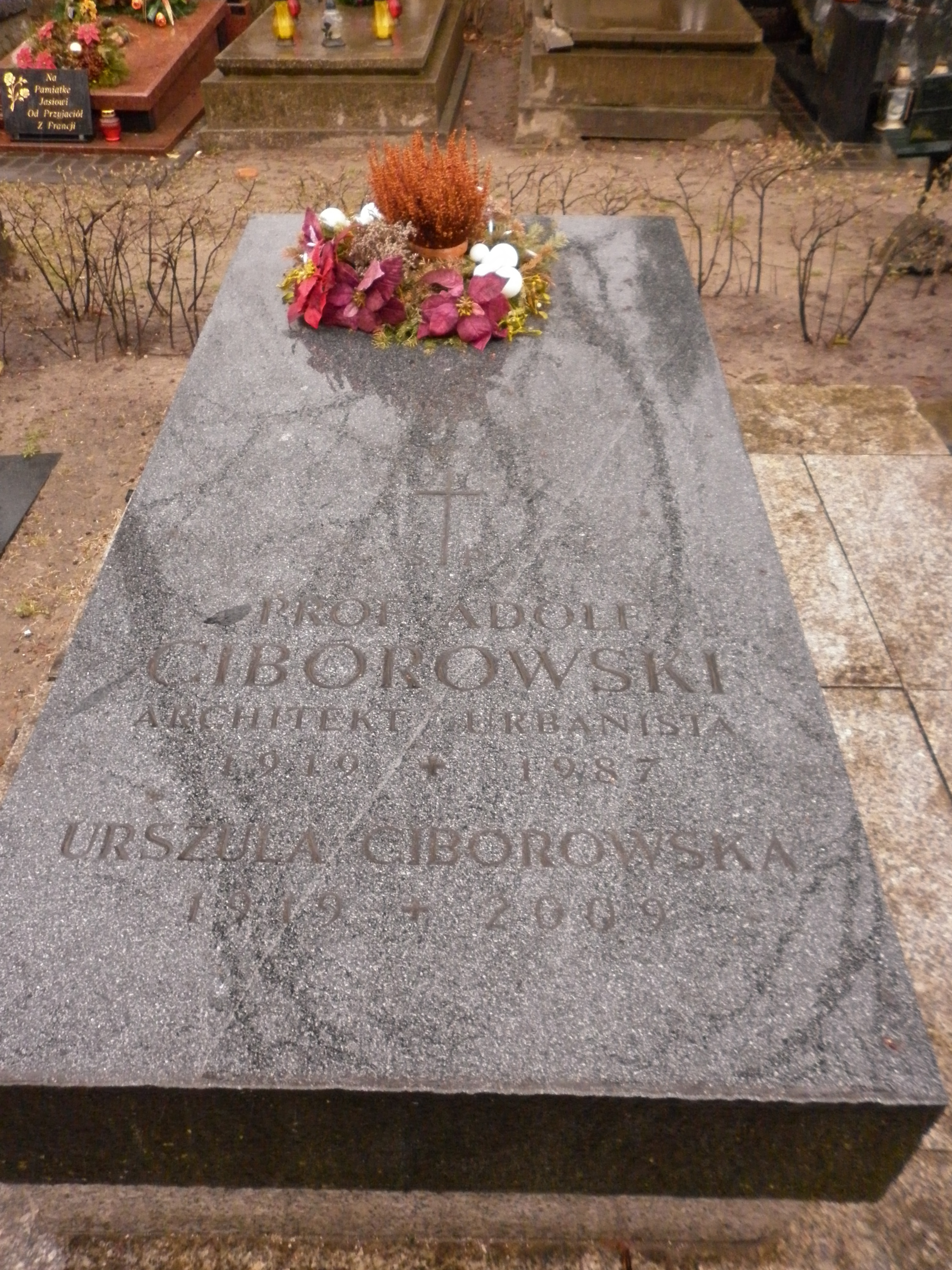
Grave of Ciborowski at Powązki Military Cemetery in Warsaw

Adolf Ciborowski (25 May 1919 – 26 January 1987) was a Polish architect, urban planner and politician.

== Life ==
Ciborowski was born on 25 May 1919 in Warsaw. He graduated from the Warsaw University of Technology in 1946. In the years 1947–1948 he worked as director of the City Planning Bureau in Szczecin. He was the Chief Architect of Warsaw between 1956 and 1964. He contributed to the rebuilding of Warsaw after the Second World War. He was hired as a planner for war-damaged Hannover and was the first foreigner to receive a town-planning prize from Leibniz University Hannover (in 1965). He also worked as consultant on the master plan for Baghdad and supervised the reconstruction and urban plan of Skopje alongside Stanisław Janowski after its destruction by an earthquake in 1963.

He was a member of the Association of Polish Architects (SARP) as well as the Polish Academy of Sciences. He also worked as a UNESCO and UNCHS advisor on the reconstruction of cities damaged by earthquakes. He died in 1987 and was buried at the Powązki Cemetery in Warsaw.

== Honours ==
- Officer's Cross of the Order of Polonia Restituta (Poland)
- Medal of the 10th Anniversary of People's Poland
- Medal of the 30th Anniversary of People's Poland
- Medal of the 40th Anniversary of People's Poland
- Order of the Yugoslav Flag (Yugoslavia)
- Order of the Crown (Belgium)

== See also ==
- Urban planning
