= 1963 Skopje earthquake =

Earthquake in SR Macedonia

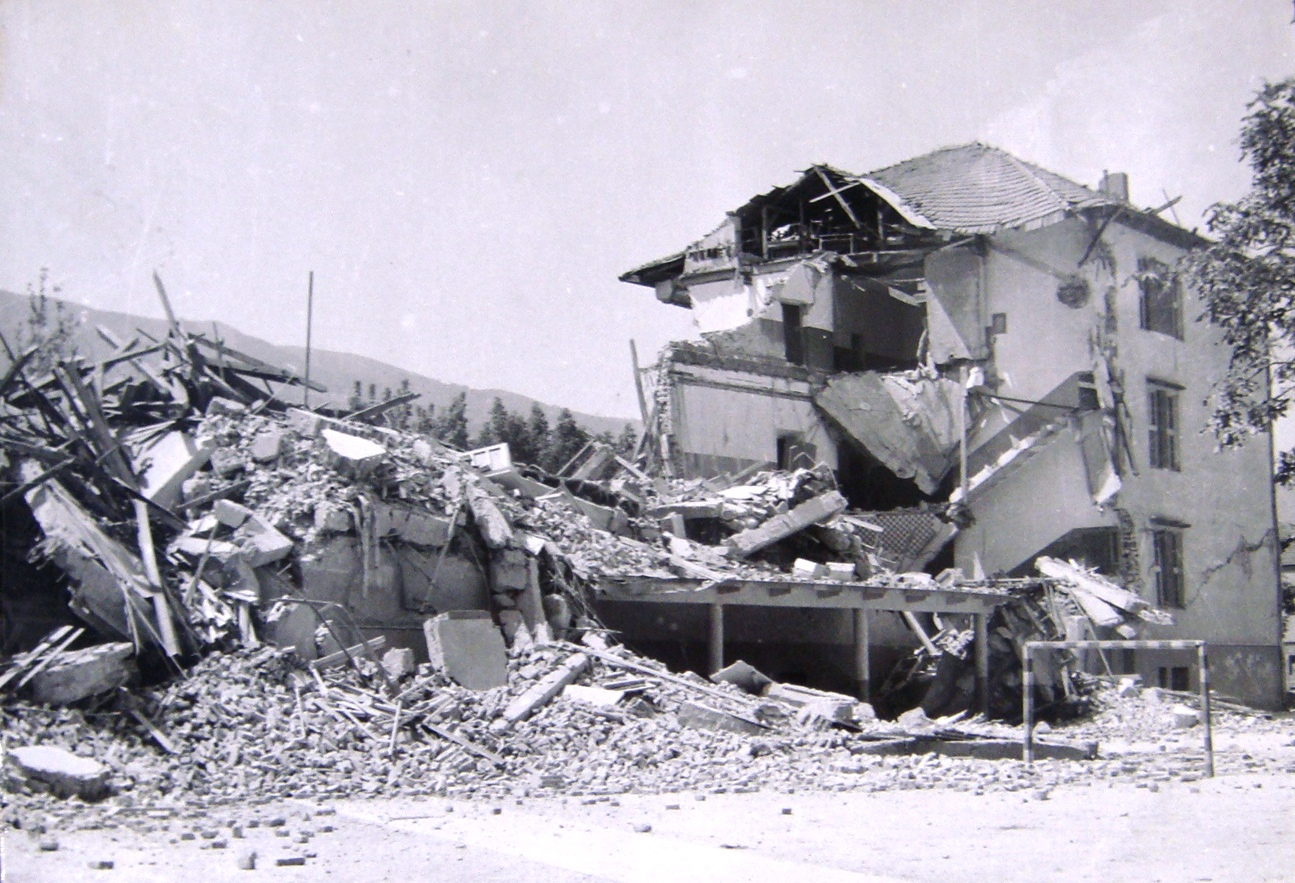
- Damage in Skopje following the earthquake

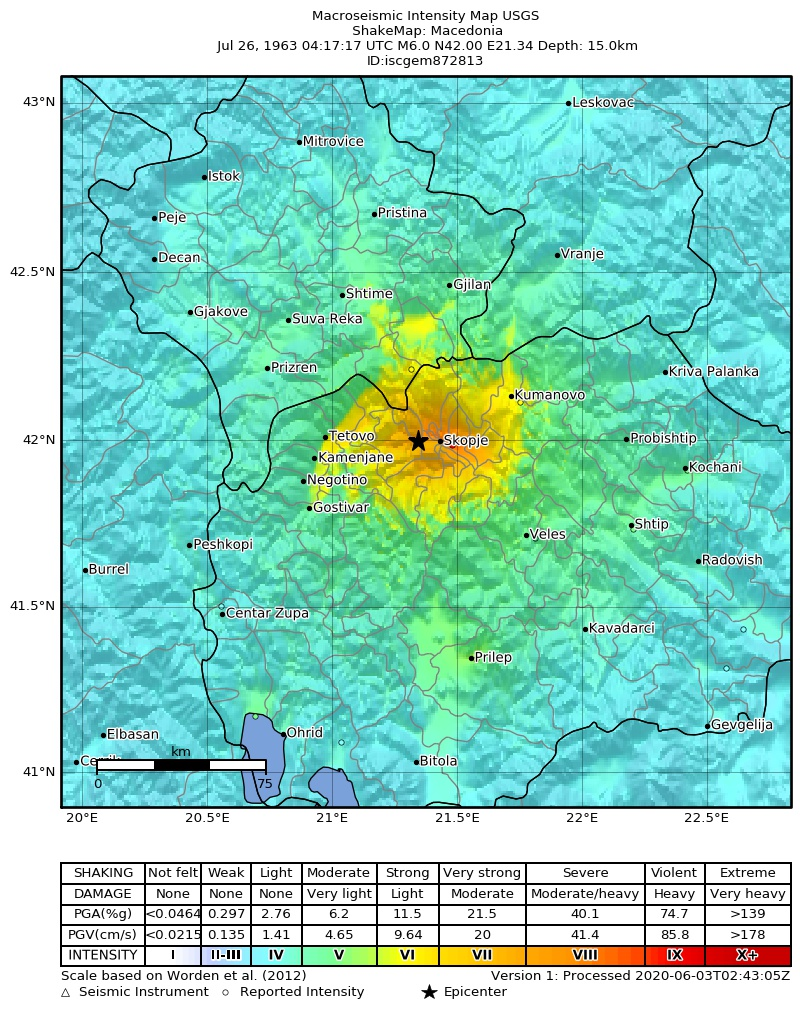
- USGS ShakeMap

- UTC time: 1963-07-26 04:17:17
- ISC event: 872813
- USGS-ANSS: ComCat
- Local date: July 26, 1963
- Local time: 5:17
- Magnitude: 6.1 M_{w}
- Depth: 6 kilometres (4 mi)
- Epicenter: 42.10°N 21.40°E
- Areas affected: SR Macedonia, SFR Yugoslavia
- Max. intensity: MMI X (Extreme)
- Casualties: 1,000–1,100 killed: 3,000–4,000 injured; 200,000 left homeless; 75–80% of city destroyed

The 1963 Skopje earthquake (Macedonian: Скопски земјотрес од 1963 година) occurred in present-day North Macedonia (at the time, it was called the Socialist Republic of Macedonia). The 6.1 moment magnitude shock had a maximum Mercalli intensity of X (Extreme) and resulted in more than 1,000 deaths and between 3,000 and 4,000 injuries. More than 200,000 people were left homeless. About 80 percent of the city was destroyed.

== Facts ==
The earthquake, which measured 6.1 on the moment magnitude scale, occurred on July 26, 1963, at 04:17 UTC (5:17 am local time) in Skopje, Socialist Republic of Macedonia (present-day North Macedonia), then part of SFR Yugoslavia. The tremor lasted for 20 seconds and was felt mostly along the Vardar River Valley. There were also smaller aftershocks until 5:43.

== Aftermath ==
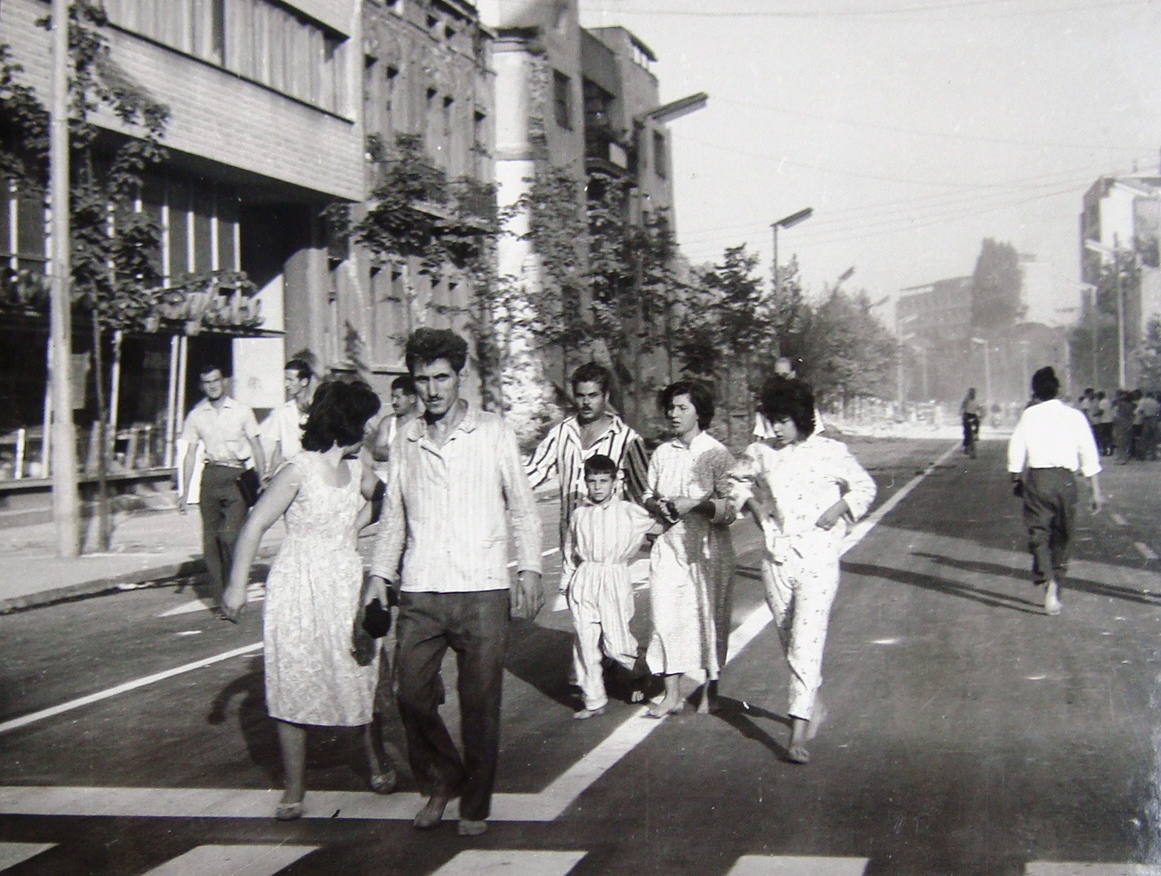
First hours after the earthquake

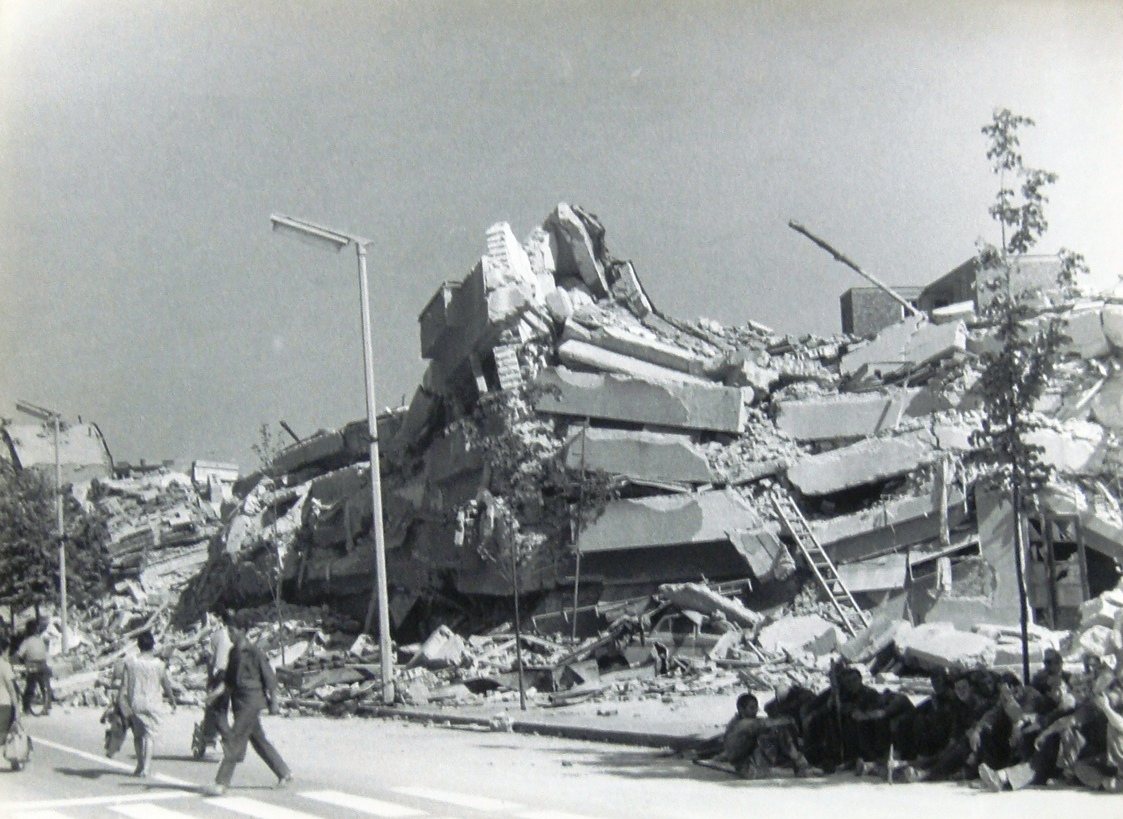
Destroyed apartment building in downtown Skopje.

Following the earthquake, Josip Broz Tito, president of SFR Yugoslavia, sent a message of condolences to the Socialist Republic of Macedonia before visiting the city personally later on. Within a few days after the earthquake took place, 35 nations requested that the United Nations General Assembly place relief for Skopje on their list of agendas. The effort led to the implementation of a major urban and architectural reconstruction plan urban master-plan of Skopje 1963. Relief, in the form of money, medical, engineering and building teams and supplies was offered from 78 countries throughout the world.

United States president John F. Kennedy ordered the Department of Defense and the Agency for International Development (USAID) to take actions for disaster assistance in Skopje by sending personnel, prefabricated houses, tent cities and other forms of relief. Substantial relief also arrived from the Soviet Union. Its leader, Nikita Khrushchev, visited Skopje personally. As the SFR Yugoslavia was a member of the Non-Aligned Movement during the Cold War, the American and Soviet troops stationed in Skopje could freely shake hands for the first time since their encounter on Elbe in 1945.

The first foreign journalist who arrived in Skopje to report on the earthquake was David Binder of The New York Times. As he watched Skopje from the plane, he commented that the city looked like it was bombed.

The United Kingdom-based charity War on Want organised a public appeal and contracted with UK engineer Demetrius Comino to provide Dexion building frame materials and personnel under Barto Stuart to enable the building of 1560 dwellings, enough for two complete villages, one of which was nicknamed Dexiongrad. Dexion belongs to the Skopje's Municipality of Gjorče Petrov. At the same time, the UK Government made a gift of 44 x 24 feet wide Nissen huts which the Yugoslav authorities used as six schools to be used in satellite suburbs until permanent schools could be established. The construction of these huts was under the supervision of a small detachment of nine Royal Engineers led by Lt Charles Brodley RE. Later, "War on Want" purchased sufficient huts to provide accommodation for 2,000 workmen engaged in the reconstruction of the city and the Engineer detachment was increased to 49 under the command of Captain SL Rooth RE.

In 1965, the Japanese architect Kenzo Tange was asked by the United Nations to enter a limited competition for the redevelopment of Skopje, after which Tange won 60% of the prize while the Yugoslav team won the remaining 40%. However, Tange's plan for Skopje (one of his major works) remains partly implemented, specifically concerning the New Skopje Railway Station and the so-called City Wall.

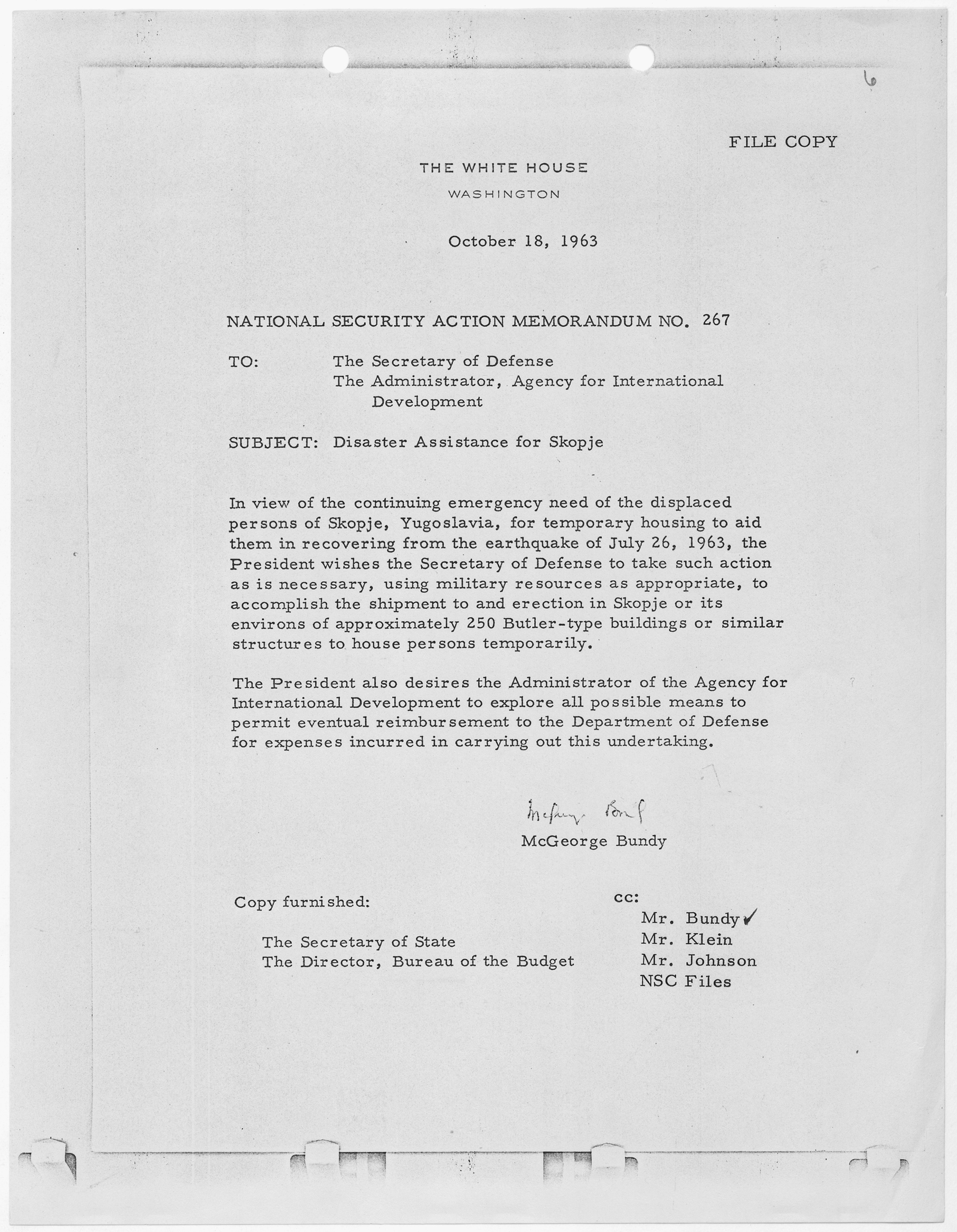
From John F. Kennedy Library: National Security Action Memorandum No. 267 Disaster Assistance for Skopje – NARA – 193638, written and signed on October 18, 1963, by president Kennedy's national security advisor McGeorge Bundy

As the city gradually began to recover, the need for revival of cultural life arose. The artist Pablo Picasso donated his painting Head of a Woman (1963), which was exhibited in the new post-earthquake Contemporary Art Museum of Macedonia. The museum building was a donation from Poland and was designed by several Polish architects. The concert hall "Univerzalna sala" was built with donations from around 35 countries and its prefabricated building was made in neighbouring Bulgaria. After the request of the Federal Executive Council of Yugoslavia the Secretary of State for Foreign and Commonwealth Affairs Rab Butler informed the House of Commons of the Parliament of the United Kingdom on February 19, 1964, that the Government of the United Kingdom has approved new 500,000 GBP loan for reconstruction of Skopje.

Several streets and objects in Skopje were named in honor of the countries which helped in their construction and/or donated housing. For example, the government of Romania donated the polyclinic medical center, which was named after its capital, Bucharest. In Karposh Municipality, there are Soviet-donated apartment buildings called in Macedonian: „руски згради“ (ruski zgradi, meaning "Russian buildings") and Swedish and Finnish prefabs called „шведски / фински бараки“ (švedski / finski baraki).

One example is Skopje's Mexico Street (улица Мексичка, ulica Meksička). It was officially named in honor of Mexico and a memorial plaque from the Mexican president Adolfo López Mateos was unveiled at the location. In 2012, the street's well-known resident, the rock musician Vlatko Stefanovski and his brother, the playwright Goran Stefanovski protested against the mayor's decision to rename several city streets, including Mexico Street. The Stefanovski brothers reminded people that the street they grew up on and where the Macedonian rock group Leb i sol was formed was built with donations from Mexico and argued that this act of solidarity must never be forgotten. The old name Meksička was brought back in February 2021 by the Skopje City Council.

Being rebuilt from ruins thanks to the relief from all around the world, Skopje is often referred to as "The City of International Solidarity", which is its motto.

One year after the 1963 Skopje earthquake, the first Yugoslavian Code for Construction in Seismic Regions (temporary code 1964), was prepared by a committee consisting of international and national experts.

== Popular culture ==
The Skopje earthquake is referenced in many works of art including literature, music, theatre and films. An example is the Macedonian feature film Memento, directed by Dimitrie Osmanli in 1967. An example from the field of literature is the poem Skoplje 1963 by the Austrian poet Christine Busta.

== Gallery ==
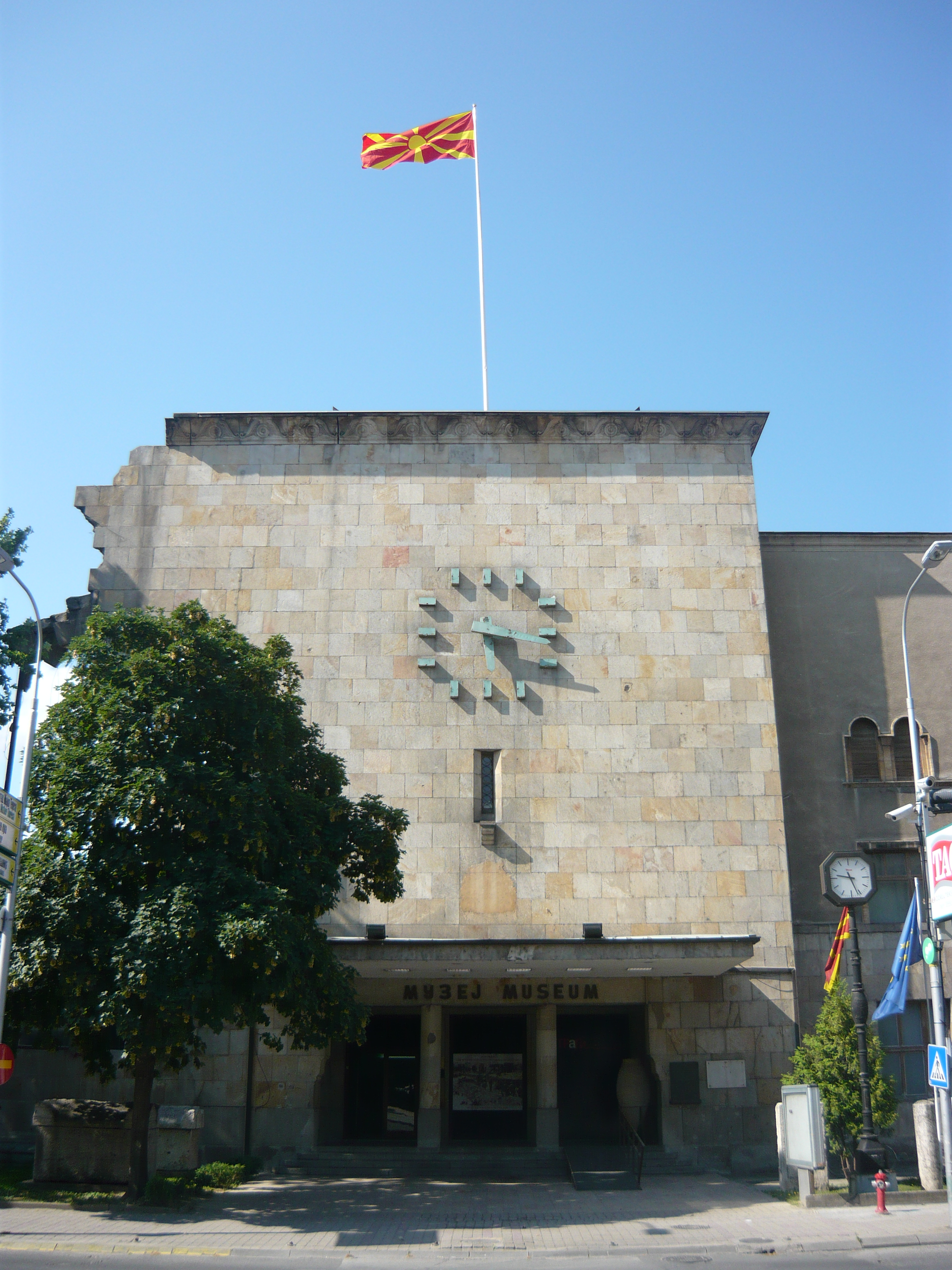
Symbol of the earthquake: The Old Railway Station in Skopje. The clock stopped at 5.17 on July 26, 1963. Today the building is used by the Museum of the City of Skopje (Muzej na grad Skopje).

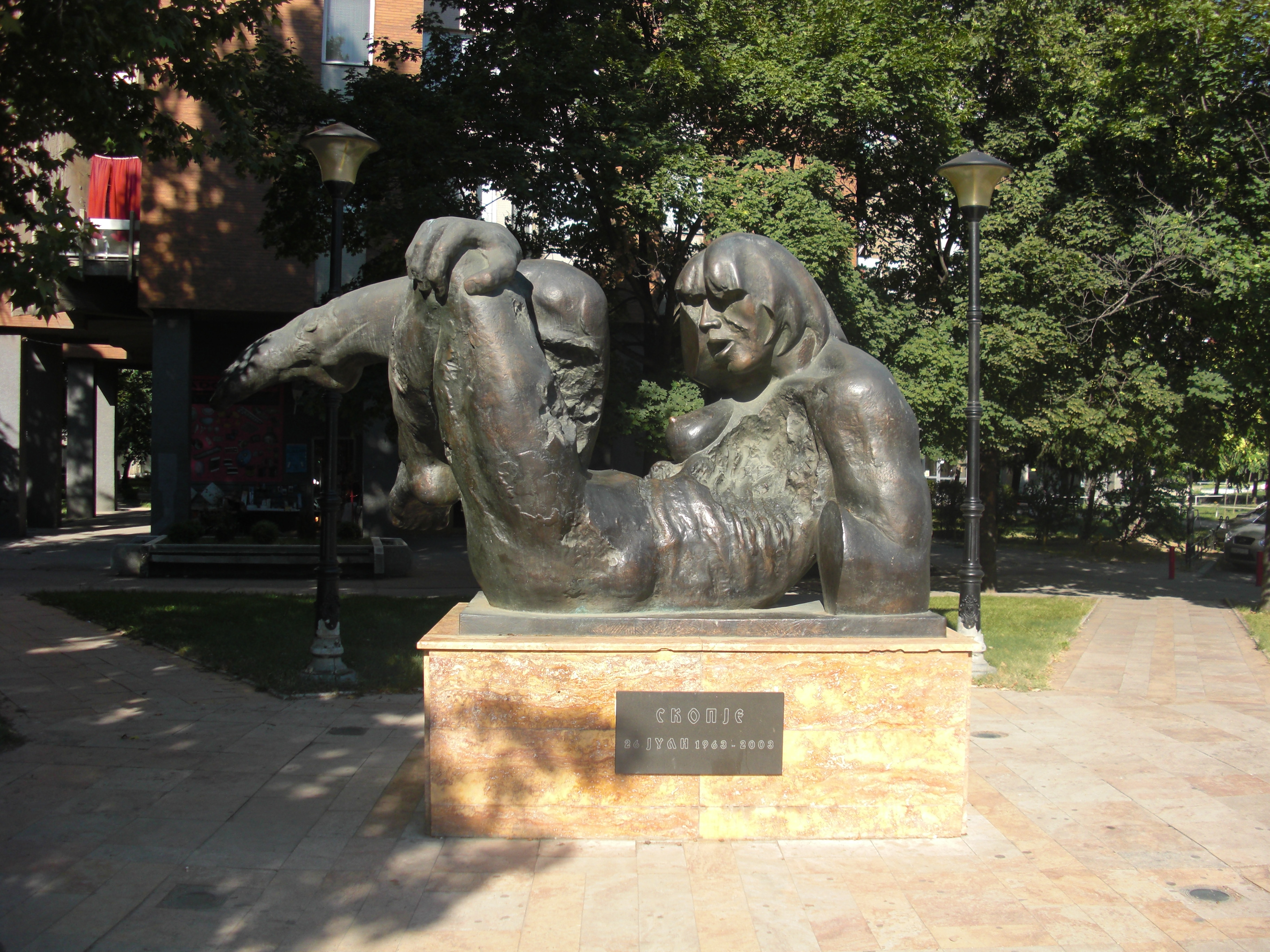
Monument dedicated to the victims of the earthquake, near the Old Railway Station

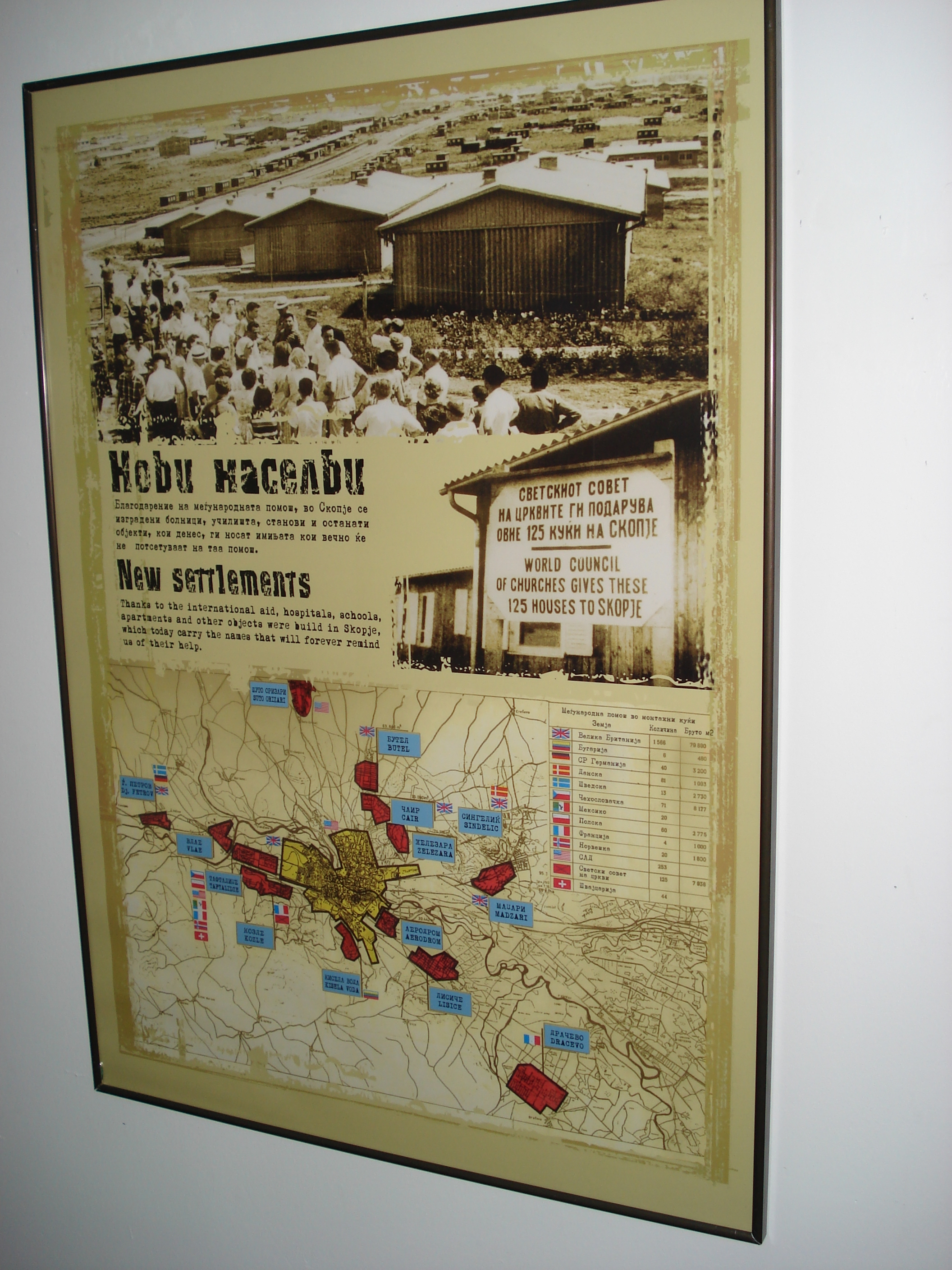
Map of new settlements in Skopje donated by other countries and the World Council of Churches.

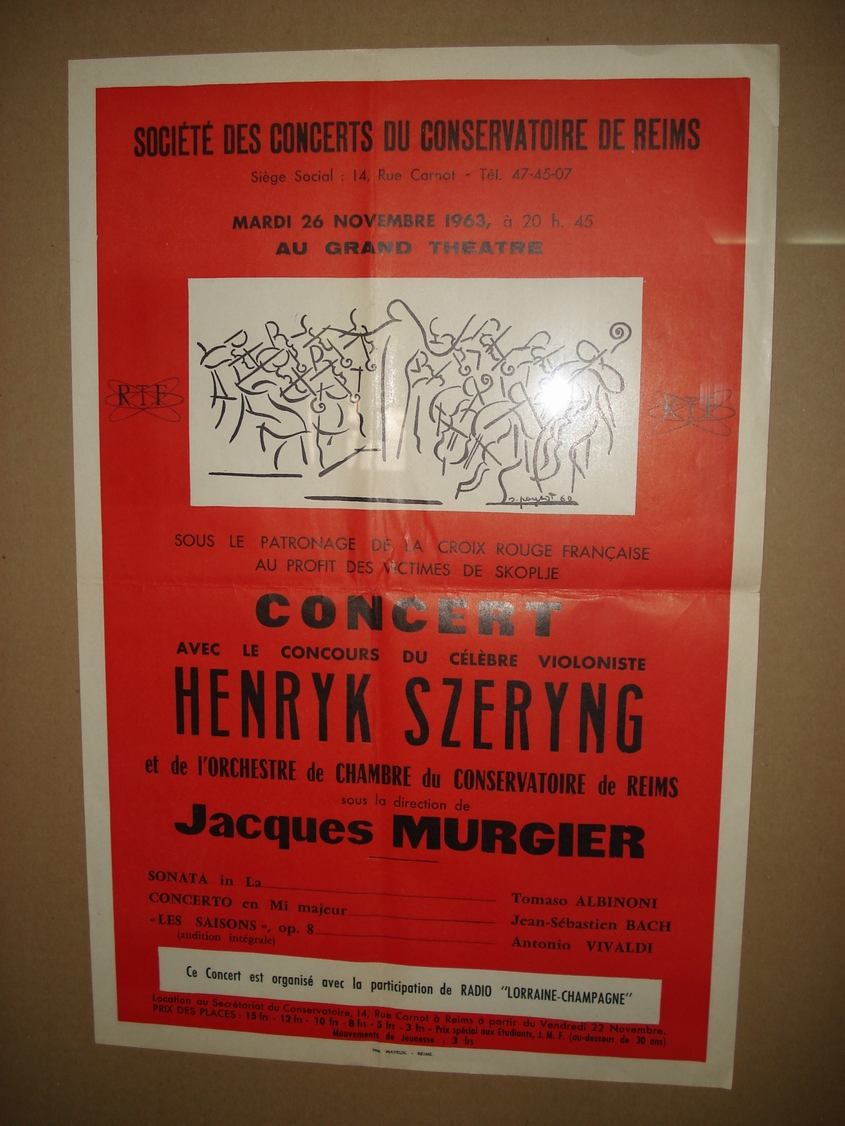
Charity concert by Henryk Szeryng for the victims of the Skopje earthquake, Reims, France, November 26, 1963

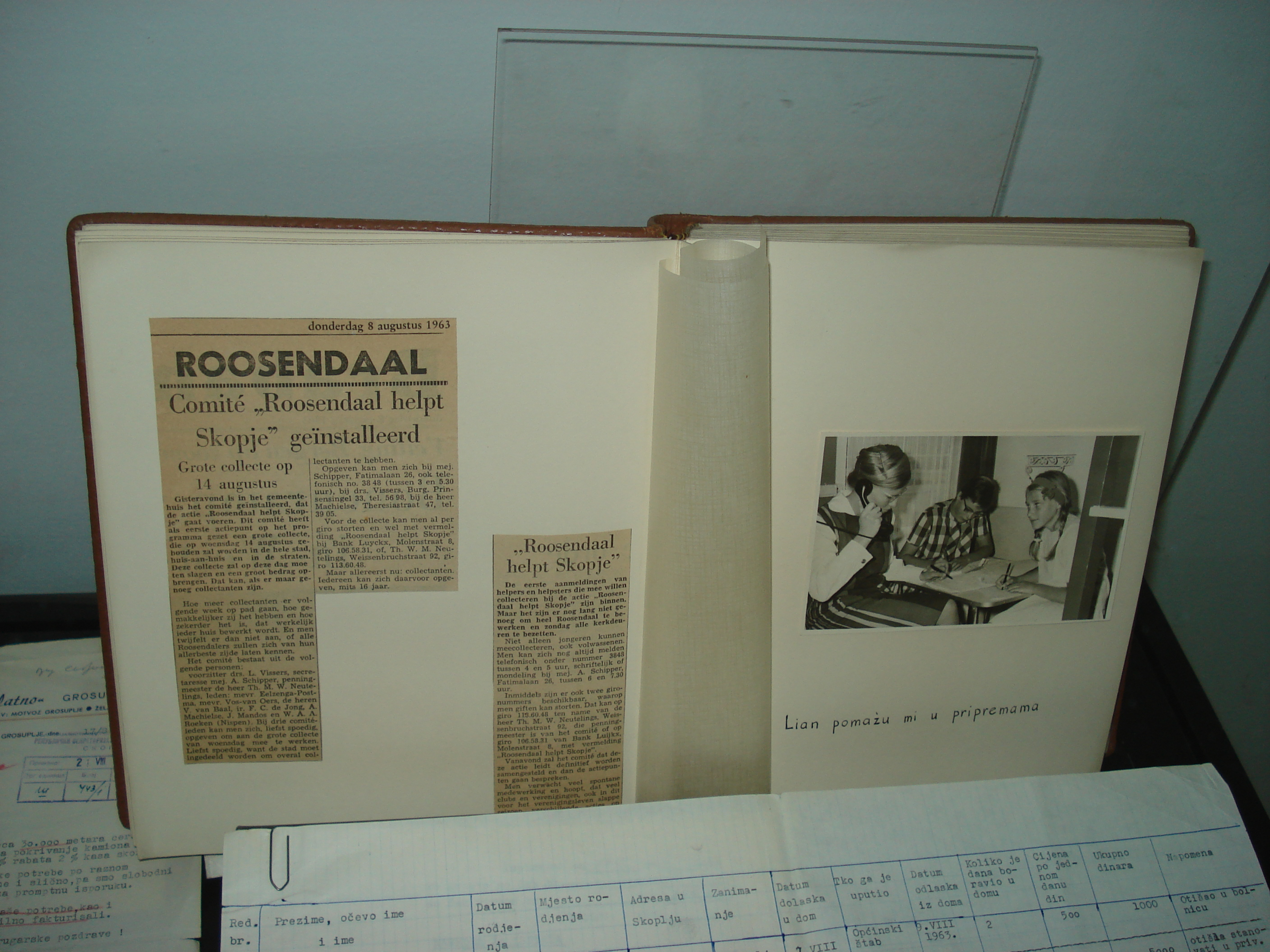
Newspaper clips: Help for the citizens of Skopje from Roosendaal, Netherlands, August 8, 1963

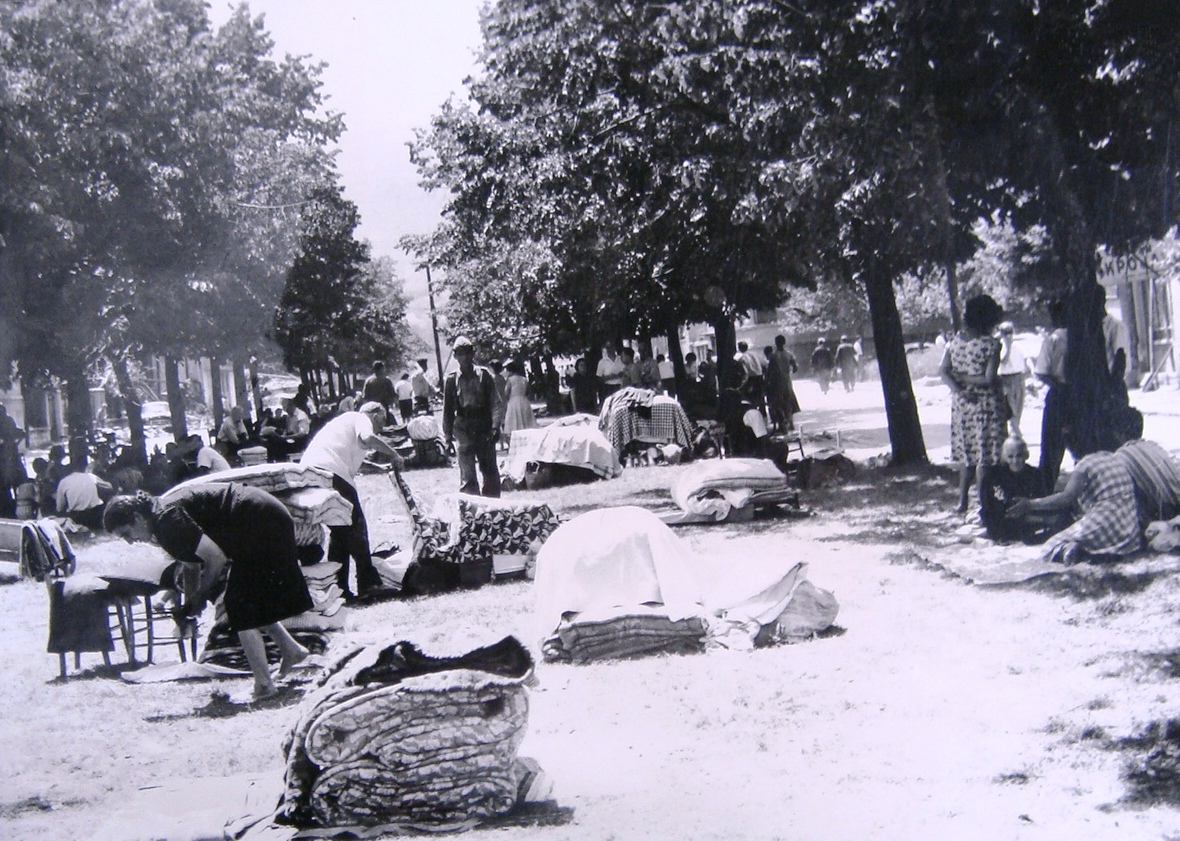
The next day after the earthquake, citizens preparing temporary dwellings.

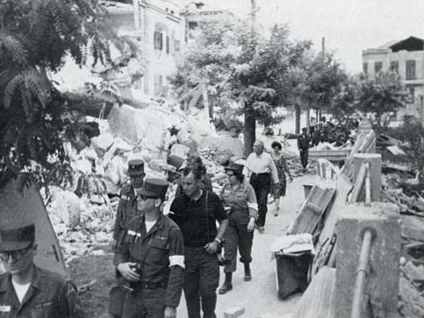
Members of the United States Army 8th Evacuation Hospital in Skopje.

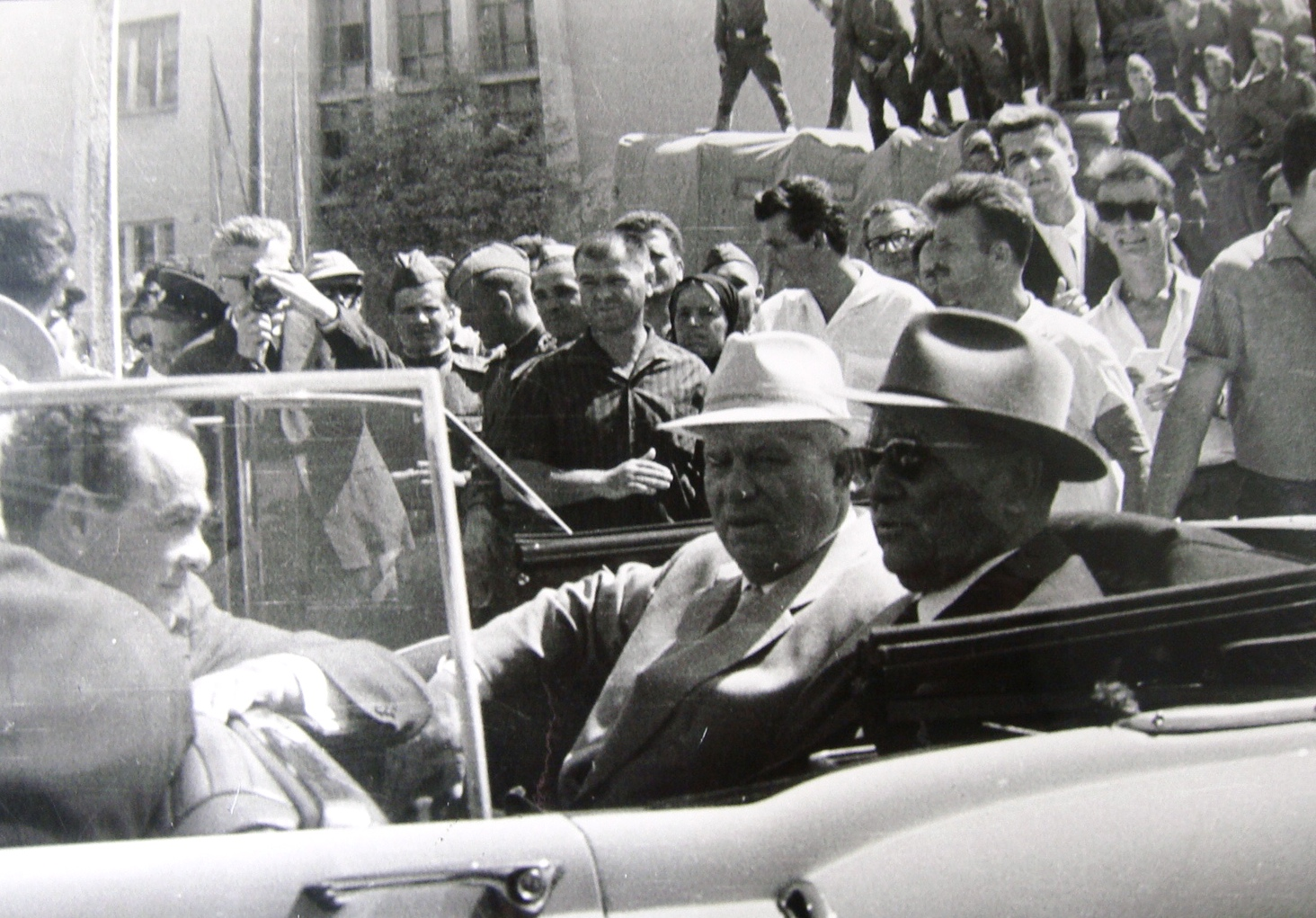
Josip Tito and Nikita Khrushchev in Skopje one month after the earthquake.

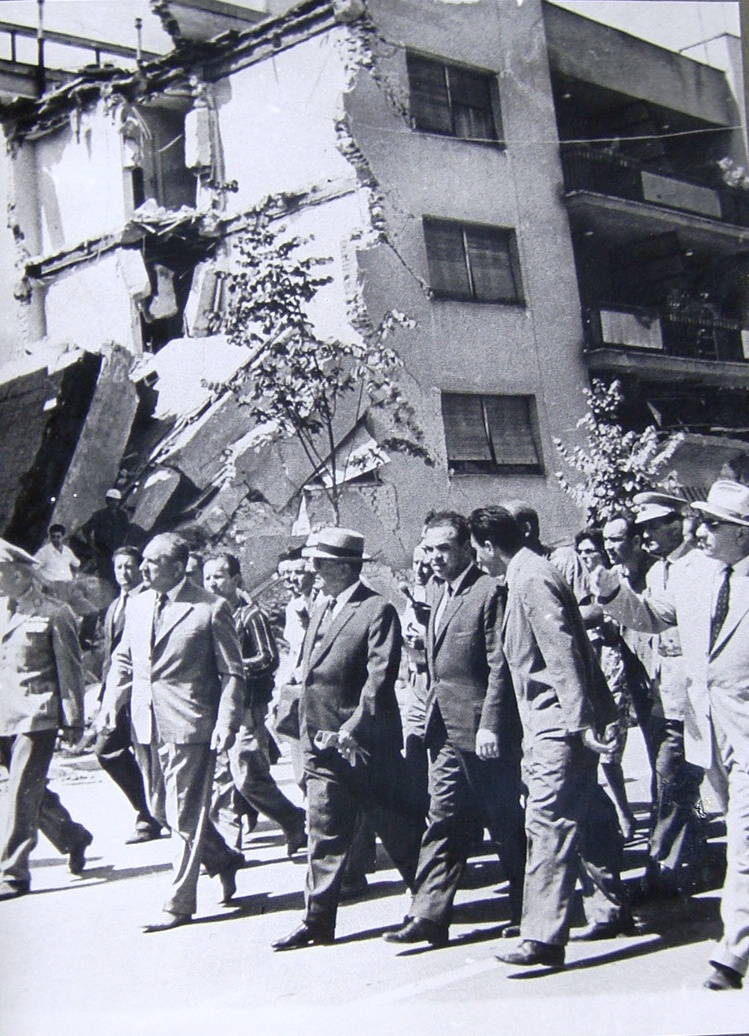
Yugoslav delegation led by Josip Broz Tito, on "Ivo Lola Ribar" street.

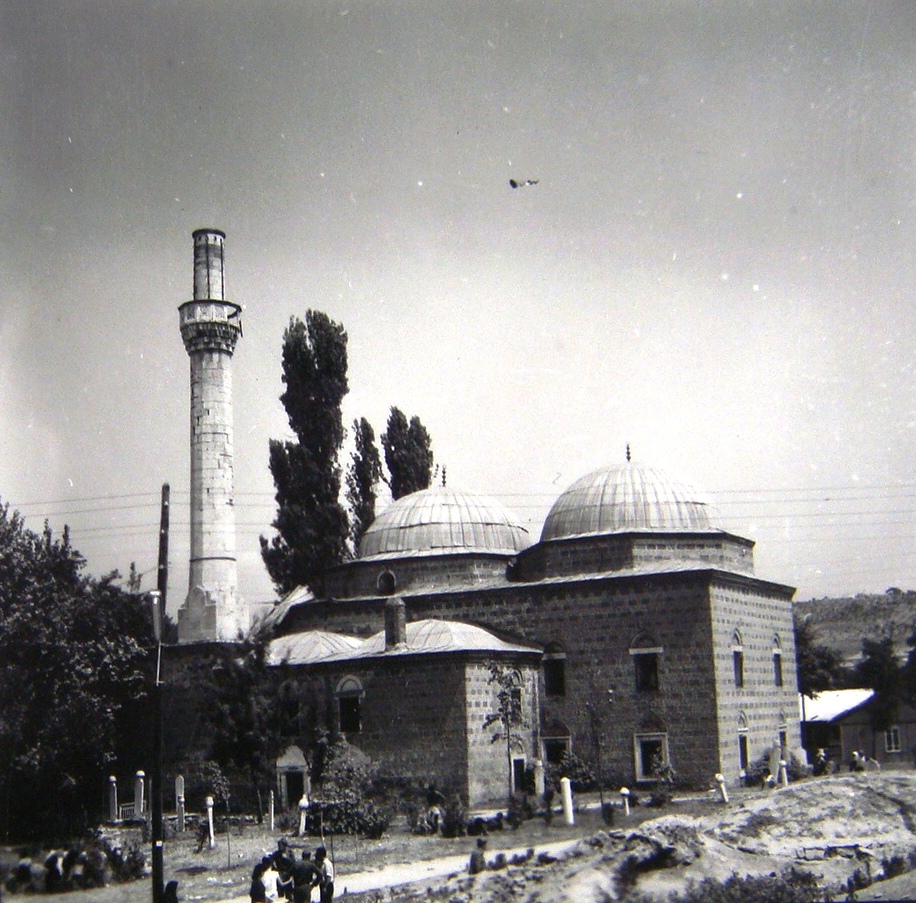
Isa Bey Mosque after the earthquake

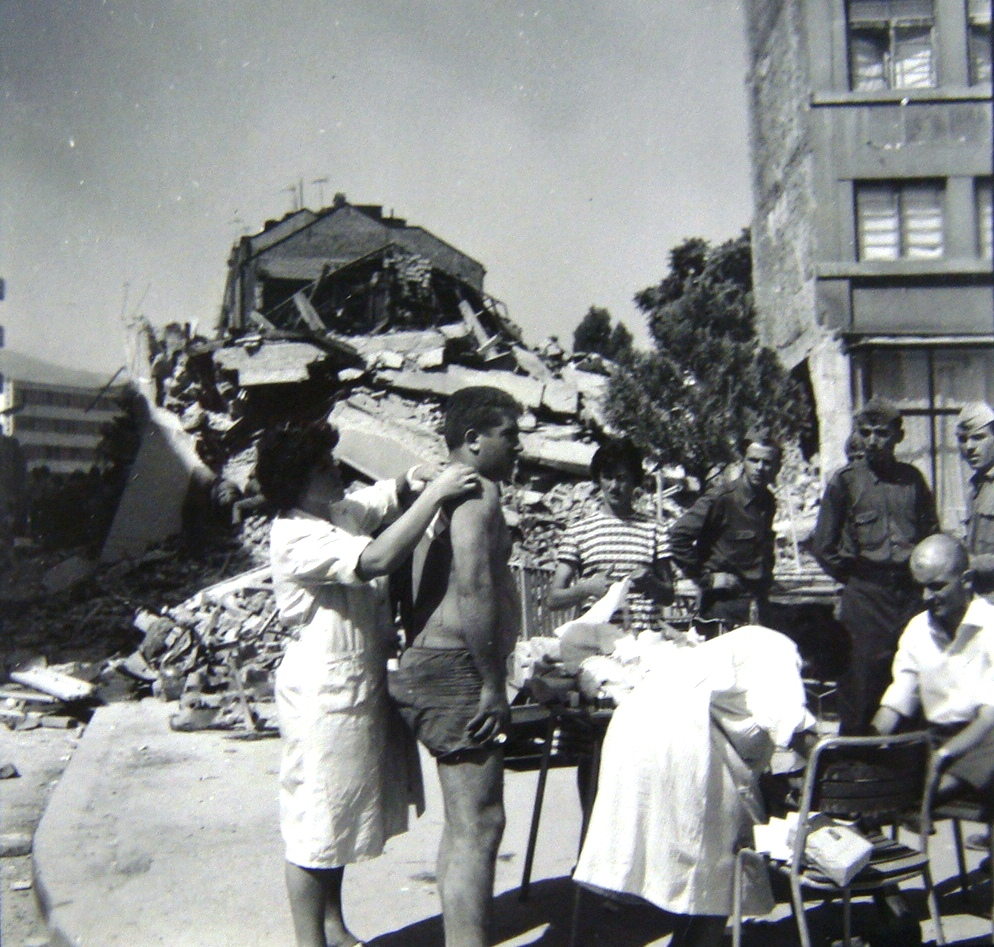
Giving first aid to casualties in front of hotel Macedonia

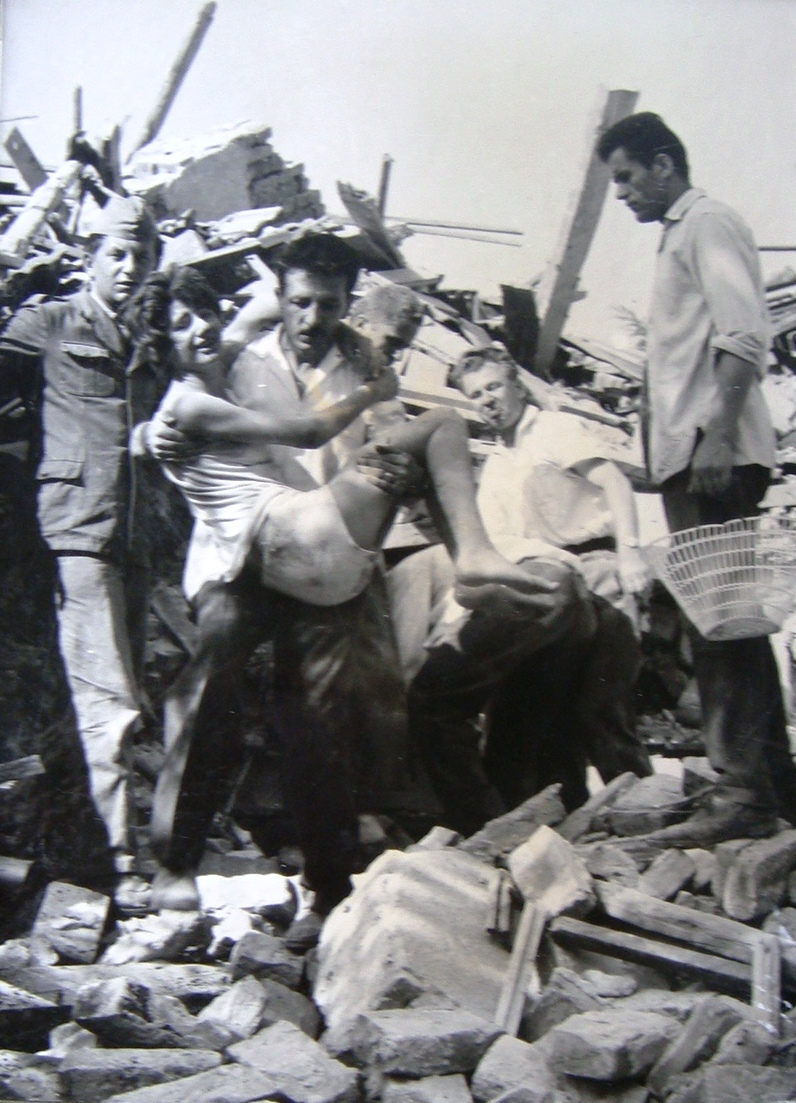
Citizens help trapped and wounded

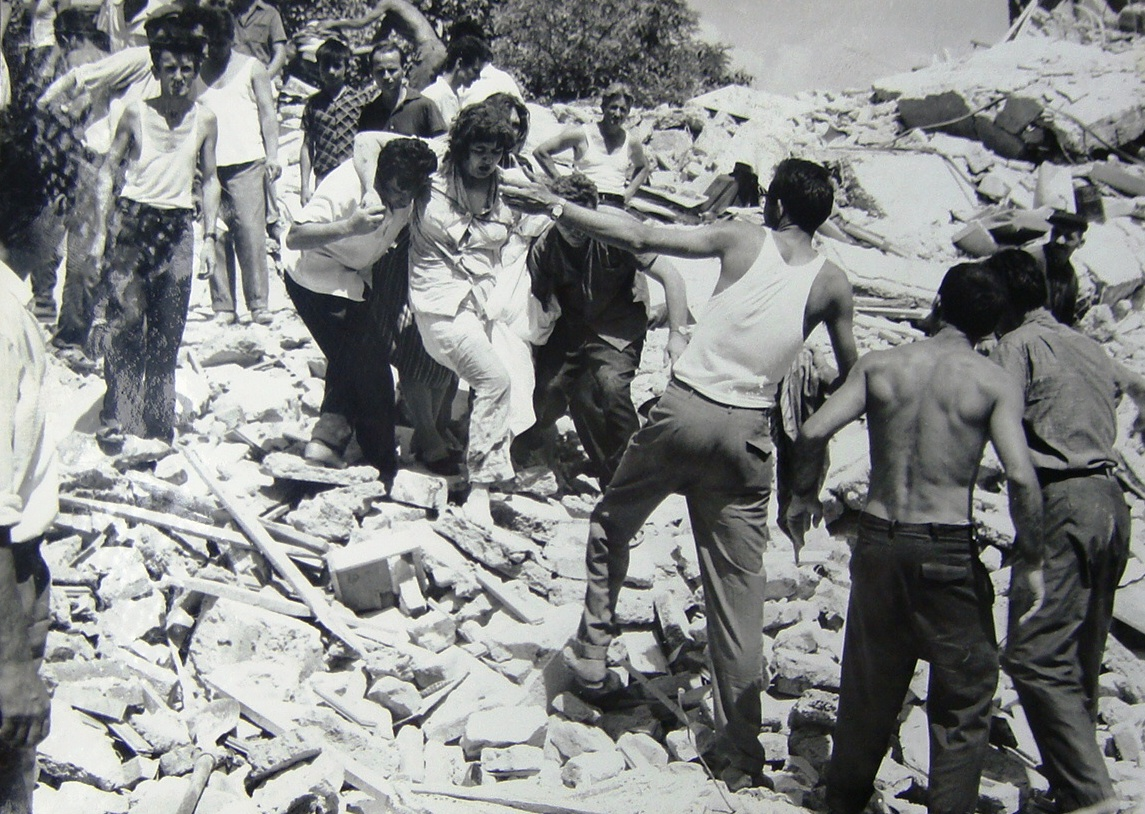
Skopje, seeking survivors

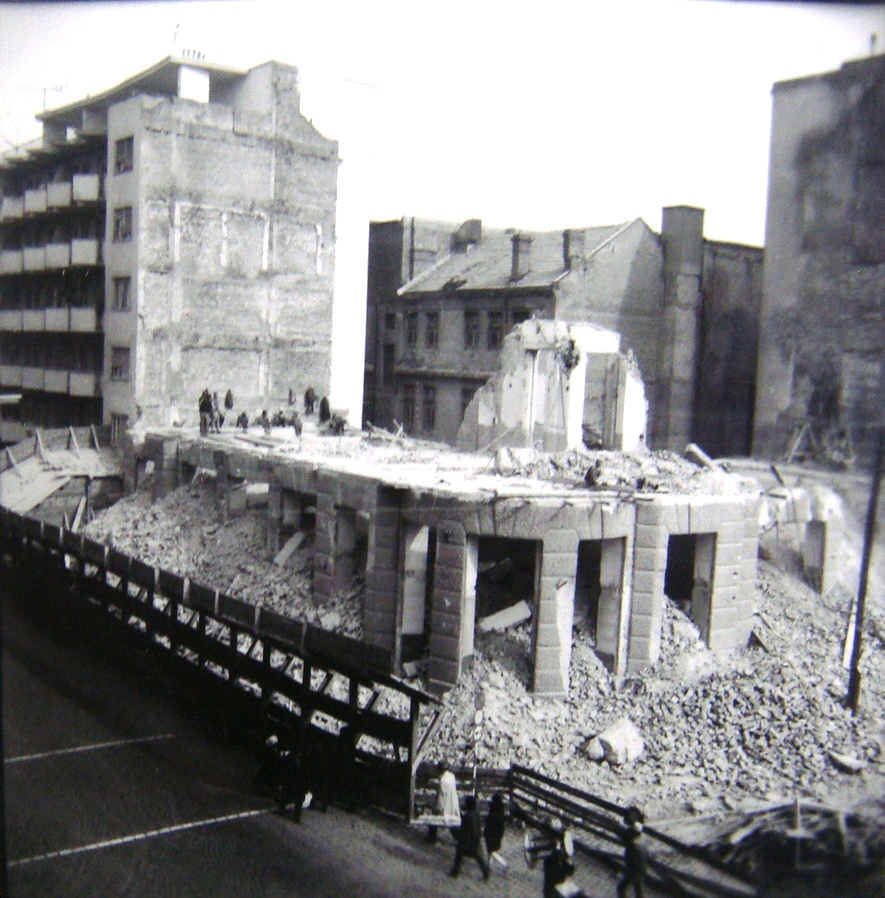
Krangova Palace during demolition

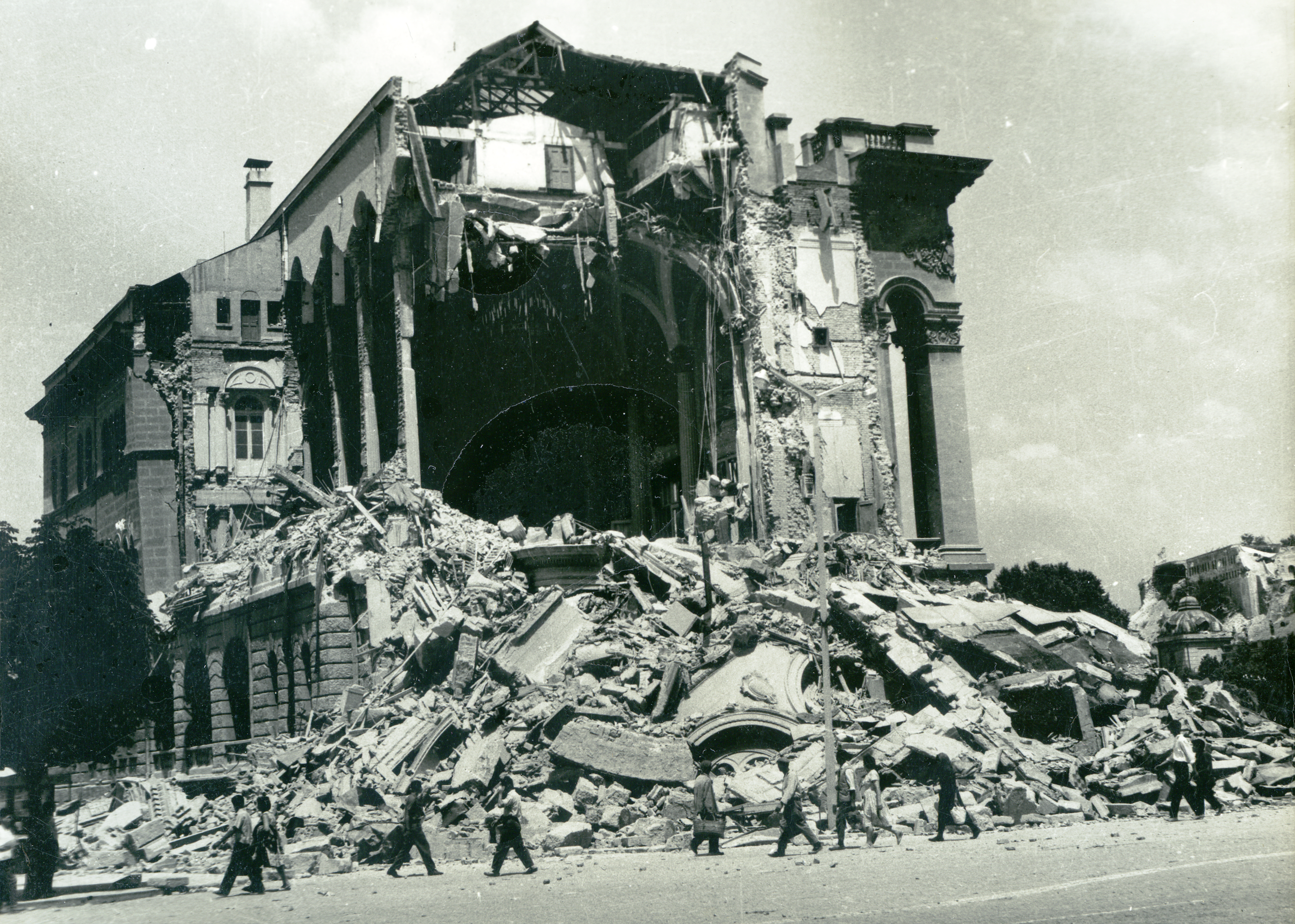
Demolished building, Skopje

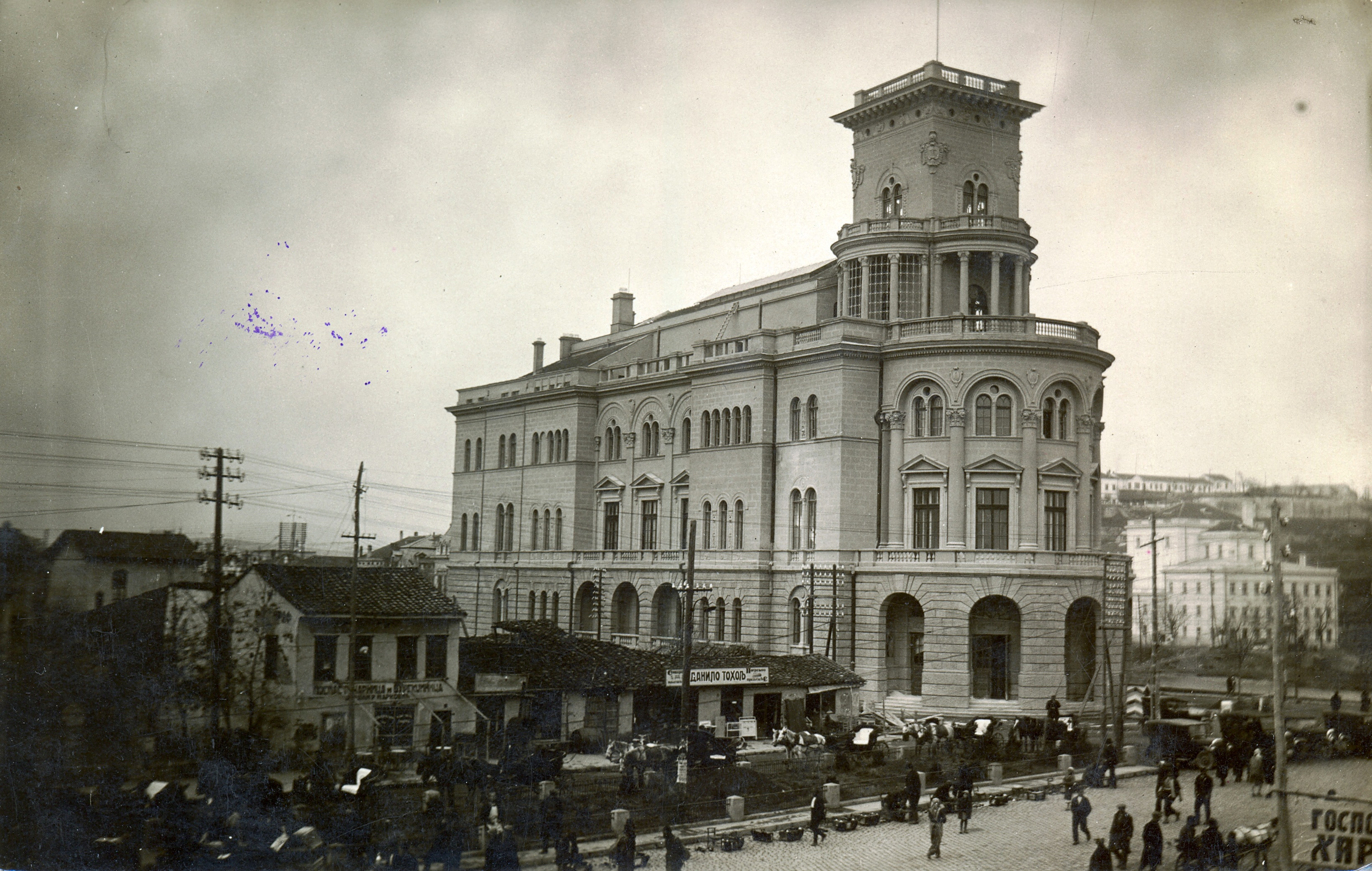
A view of the center of Skopje before the earthquake

== See also ==
- History of North Macedonia
- List of earthquakes in 1963
- Lists of earthquakes
- Skoplje '63, a 1964 documentary about the earthquake
