= National institution Cultural Center Trajko Prokopiev - Kumanovo =

Cultural institution in Kumanovo

Coordinates: 42°8′5.3″N 21°43′11.5″E

- Национална установа центар за култура "Трајко Прокопиев" - Куманово; Institucioni Nacional Qendra për Kulturë "Trajko Prokopiev" - Kumanovë
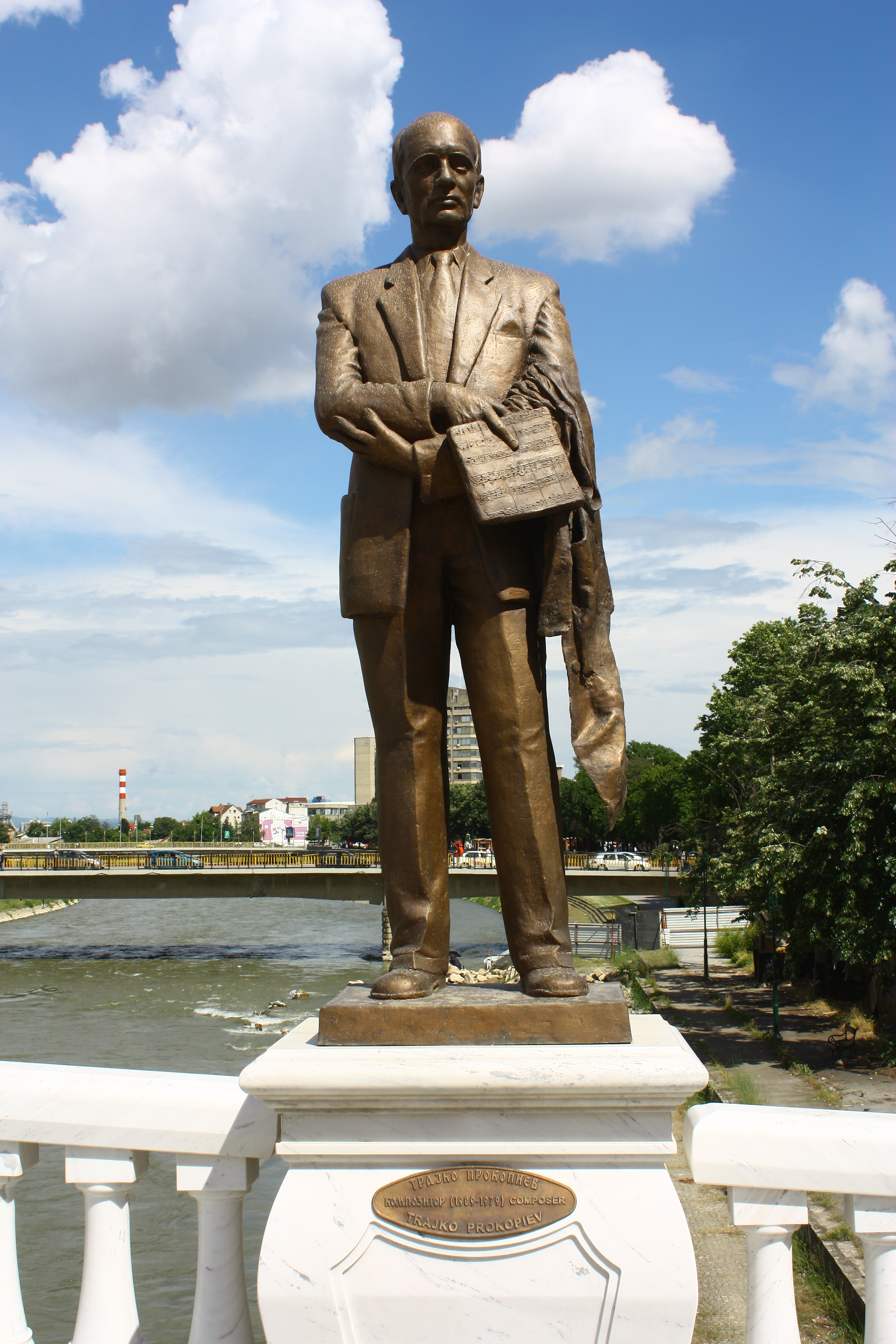
- Trajko Prokopiev statue in Skopje
- Interactive map of the National institution Cultural Center Trajko Prokopiev - Kumanovo area

General information
- Status: completed Cultural
- Location: Kumanovo, Macedonia, Macedonia
- Completed: 1980
- Opened: 1980
- Owner: Ministry of Culture of Macedonia

Logo of Ministry of Culture of Macedonia

National Institution Cultural Center Trajko Prokopiev - Kumanovo abbreviated NICC Trajko Prokopiev (Macedonian: Национална установа центар за култура "Трајко Прокопиев" - Куманово, romanized: Nacionalna ustanova centar za kultura "Trajko Prokopiev" - Kumanovo, Albanian: Institucioni Nacional Qendra për Kulturë "Trajko Prokopiev" - Kumanovë) is a cultural center in Kumanovo, North Macedonia. It holds the name of the local composer Trajko Prokopiev (1909-1979). Former name was Cultural Home "Josip Broz Tito" (Дом на култура ,,Јосип Броз Тито.

== Events ==
Date/s	Type of Event/s	Name of Event/s	Est. attendance	Artist/s	Country of origin
2006, 31 January	Ballet (Kumanovo Town Of Culture 2006)	Esmeralda	?	Macedonian Ballet	Macedonia
2006, 16 October	Concert	Brutish Council Concert	?	Trevor Wots and Celebration Bend	Macedonia
2008, 25 February	Concert	Classical Music Concert	?	Simon Trpcheski	Macedonia
2009, 26 June	Concert	Promotional concert of album Kalemar	?	Baklava	Macedonia
2011, 1 October	Theater Play (Days of Comedy)	Somnitelno lice	?	Makedonski Naroden Teatar - Skopje	Macedonia
2011, 2 October	Theater Play (Days of Comedy)	Led on the Pillow	?	Dramski Teatar - Skopje	Macedonia
2011, 4 October	Theater Play (Days of Comedy)	Metamorfozi	?	Grigor Prlichev - Theater Ohrid	Macedonia
2011, 6 October	Theater Play (Days of Comedy)	Don't walk naked	?	Pozorishte Slavija - Belgrade	Serbia
2011, 7 October	Theater Play (Days of Comedy)	Maratoncite go trcht pochesniot krug	?	Marko Cepenkov - Theater Prilep	Macedonia
2011, 10 October	Theater Play (Days of Comedy)	Brother for brother, sorrow milk for dollars	?	Istref Begoli - Theater Pech	Kosovo
2011, 12 October	Theater Play (Days of Comedy)	Quartet for two	?	Opshtinski Theater - Kyustendil	Bulgaria
2011, 13 October	Theater Play (Days of Comedy)	Stand Up Comedy	?	Perica Jerkovich; Domagaj Pintarich; Vesna Petrushevska	Bosnia; Croatia; Macedonia
2011, 15 October	Theater Play (Days of Comedy)	Generalna Proba za Samoubistvo	?	Theater Veles Jovan Hadzi Konstantin Dzinot	Macedonia
2012, 7 November	Concert	Classical Music Concert	?	Trio Vivo	Macedonia
2013, 17 April	Concert	Opera	?	Darko Todorovski, Simona Chakarjanova	Macedonia
2014, 20 May	Concert	Classical Music Concert	?	Trio Akademico	Macedonia
2014, 5 July	Concert	Humanitarian Concert	?	Tajzi	Macedonia
2014, 1 October	Theater Play (Days of Comedy)	Flight Attendances	?	Theater Comedy - Skopje	Macedonia
2014, 2 October	Theater Play (Days of Comedy)	Montenigrian in Bed	?	Montescena - Podgorica	Montenegro
2014, 3 October	Theater Play (Days of Comedy)	Dinner with Idiots	?	Kumanovo Teater Albanian Drama	Macedonia
2014, 4 October	Theater Play (Days of Comedy)	Tartif	?	Teater Veles Jovan Hadzi Konstaninov Dzinot	Macedonia
2014, 5 October	Theater Play (Days of Comedy)	Were is my wife	?	Bora Stankovich Teather - Vranje	Serbia
2014, 28 November	Concert	Classical Music Concert	?	Vaso Ritov, Marjan Miloshevski, Gligor Gelebeshev	Macedonia
2014, 3 December	Concert	Classical Music Concert	?	Duo Kirovski	Macedonia
2014, 19 December	Concert	Classical Music Concert	?	Aleksandar Kotevski, Marija Gjoshevska	Macedonia
2015 12, May	Record of condolences	Book of condolence signing for the 8 fallen Policeman after Kumanovo shootings	?	Braniteli 2001	Macedonia

== See also ==
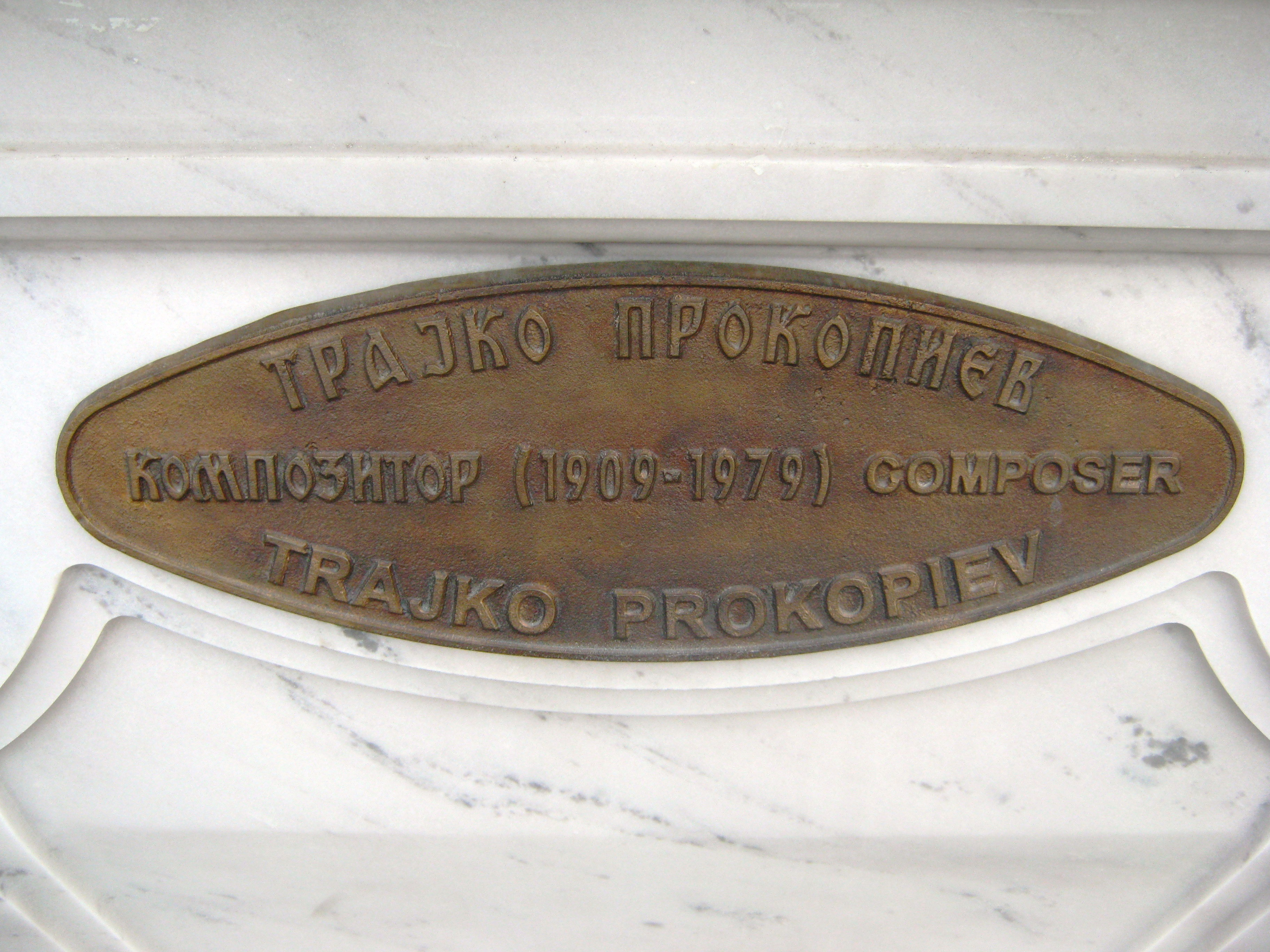
From the Prokopiev's monument in Skopje

- Museum Kumanovo
- Contemporary Art Museum of Macedonia
- Holocaust Memorial Center for the Jews of Macedonia
- Memorial House of Mother Teresa
- Museum of Macedonia
- Museum of the City of Skopje
- Museum of the Macedonian Struggle (Skopje)
- National Gallery of Macedonia
