= National Institution Museum, Kumanovo =

National institution Museum Kumanovo
- Национална установа Музеј Куманово; Institucioni Kombëtar Muzeu i Kumanovës
- Established: October 21, 1964
- Location: Kumanovo, Macedonia
- Director: Aneta Cvetanovska

National institution Museum Kumanovo (Macedonian: Национална установа Музеј Куманово, Nacionalna ustanova Muzej Kumanovo; Albanian: Institucioni Kombëtar Muzeu i Kumanovës) is a museum in Kumanovo, North Macedonia. In 2014, the museum celebrated its 50th anniversary.

== Governance ==
The museum is owned and operated by the Ministry of Culture of Macedonia.

== Gallery ==
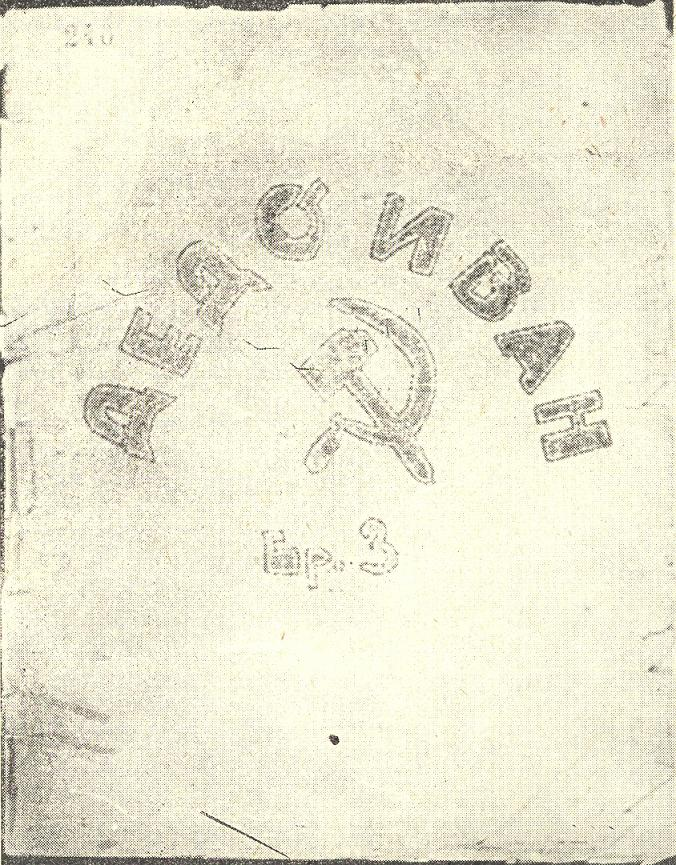
Dedo Ivan, Newspaper from 1941

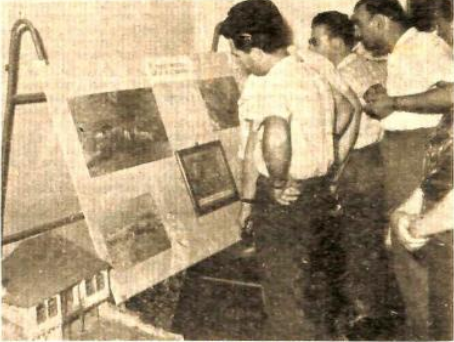
Kumanovo Museum opening 26.06.1963

== See also ==
- Cultural Center Trajko Prokopiev
- Contemporary Art Museum of Macedonia
- Holocaust Memorial Center for the Jews of Macedonia
- Memorial House of Mother Teresa
- Museum of Macedonia
- Museum of the City of Skopje
- Museum of the Macedonian Struggle (Skopje)
- National Gallery of Macedonia
