= List of museums in North Macedonia =

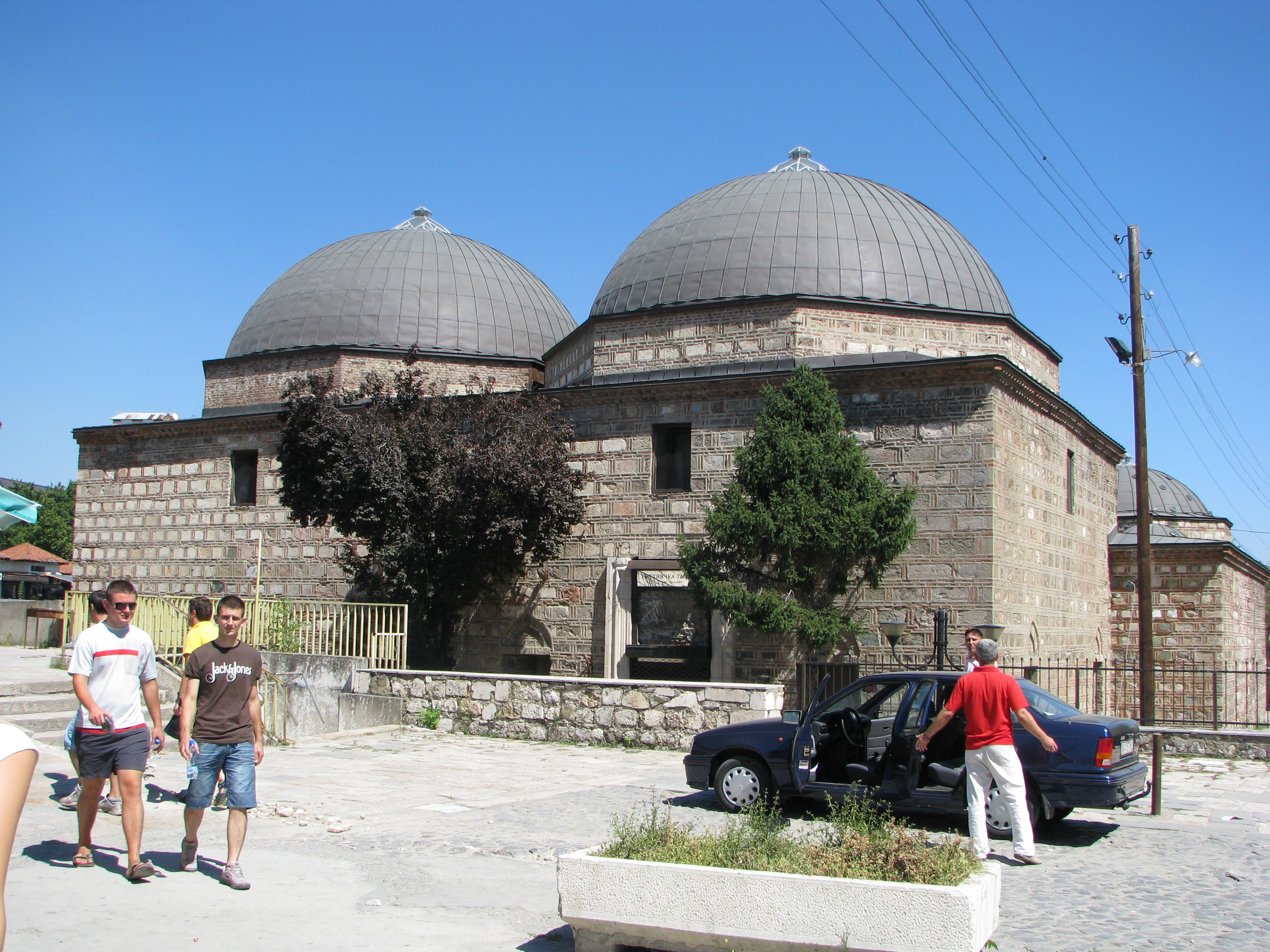
National Gallery

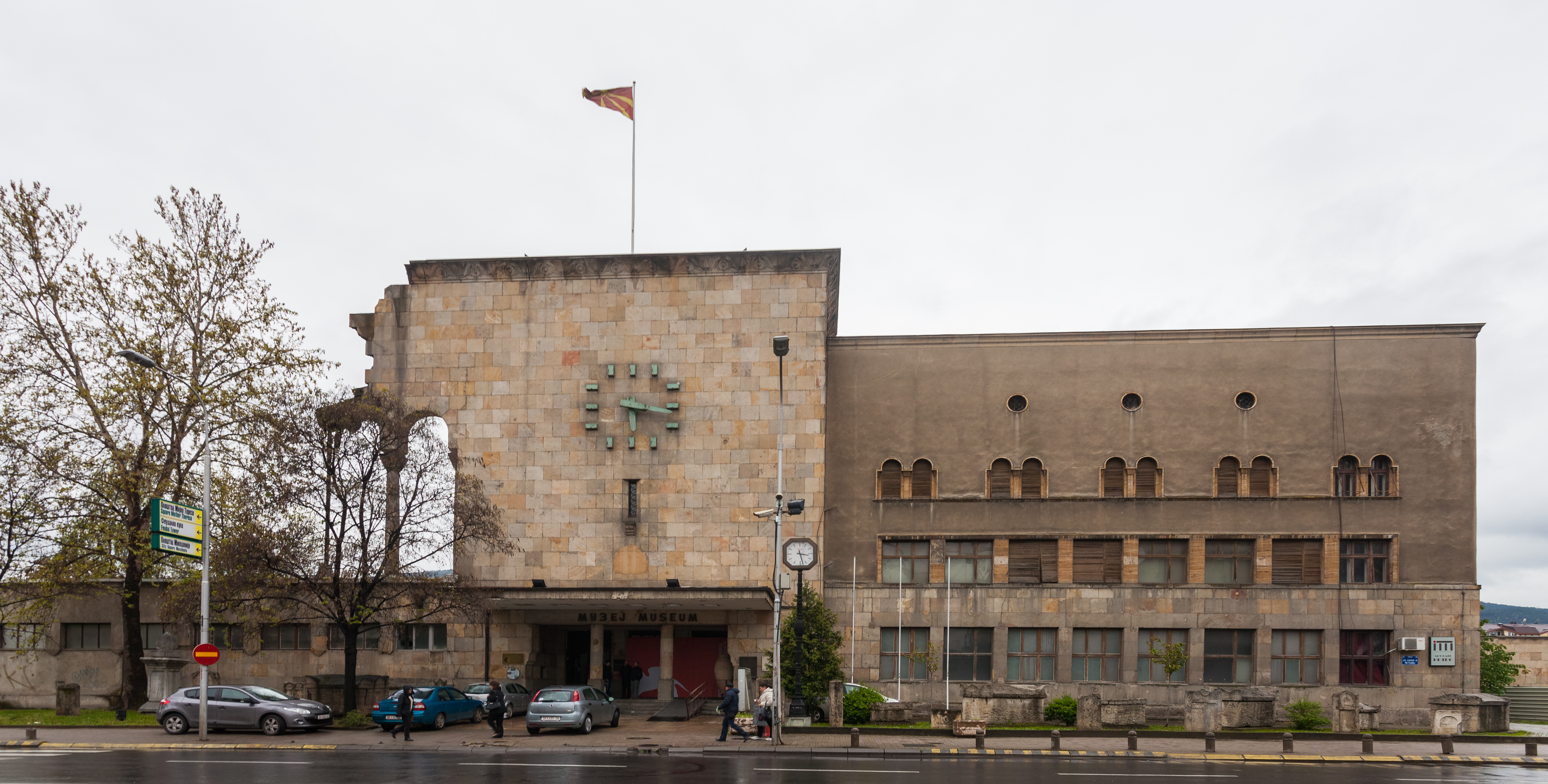
Museum of the City of Skopje

This is a list of museums in North Macedonia.

- Museum of Contemporary Art (Skopje)
- Holocaust Memorial Center for the Jews of Macedonia
- Memorial House of Mother Teresa
- Museum of the Activists of IMRO from Štip and Štip Region
- Museum of the Republic of North Macedonia
- Museum of the City of Skopje (established in 1949)
- Museum of the Macedonian Struggle (Skopje)
- National Gallery
- Macedonian Museum of Natural History
- Archaeological Museum of Macedonia
- ASNOM Memorial Center

== See also ==
- List of museums
- Tourism in North Macedonia
- Culture of North Macedonia
