= Days of Comedy =

Comedy festival in Macedonia

- Location: Kumanovo, Macedonia
- Festival date: Annually
- Website: www.denovinakomedija.mk/about.aspx

Days of Comedy (Macedonian Cyrillic: Денови на комедија) is an international theater comedy festival in Kumanovo, Macedonia. The festival is held at the Cultural Center Trajko Prokopiev annually. Theaters from Serbia, Bulgaria, Montenegro and other countries participate.

== See also ==
- Cultural Center Trajko Prokopiev
- Museum Kumanovo
- Kumanovo
