= Suli An =

Suli An Сули ан Hani i Sulit
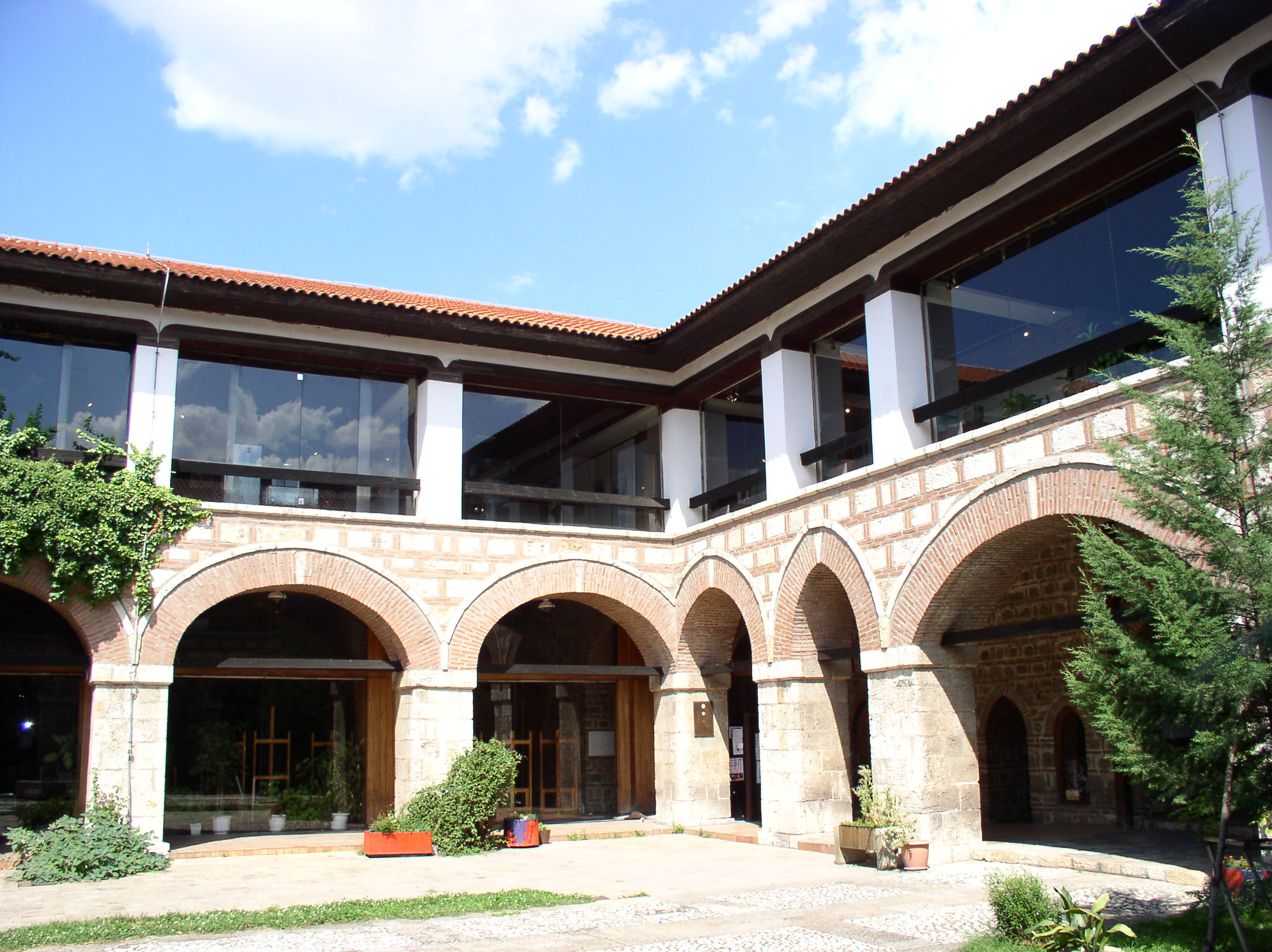
- Interactive map of the Suli An; Сули ан Hani i Sulit area

General information
- Type: han
- Location: Old Bazaar, Skopje, North Macedonia
- Coordinates: 42.0016°N 21.4377°E
- Completed: mid-15th century

Design and construction
- Architect: Isa-Beg Ishaković

The Suli An (Macedonian: Сули ан, Albanian: Hani i Sulit, Turkish: Sulu Han) is a han in the Old Bazaar of Skopje, North Macedonia. It was built in the mid-15th century by Isa-Beg Isaković. Today, the building houses the permanent exhibition History of the Old Bazaar of the Museum of the City of Skopje.

== Etymology ==
The name of the han is derived from the Turkish Sulu Han, with su which meaning water, and the word sulu meaning "with water". This name was probably chosen because a small river used to run near the han.

== Characteristics ==
The total area of the han is around 2,100m². During the Ottoman Empire, the Suli An was a classic city han for travelers and traders with their caravans.

The Suli An was damaged in the 1963 Skopje earthquake but was reconstructed in 1972.

Today, the building houses the Skopje Faculty of Arts and the Museum of the Old Bazaar of Skopje.

== See also ==
- Caravanserai
- Old Bazaar, Skopje
- Ottoman Vardar Macedonia
