= Museum of the Republic of North Macedonia =

Museum in the Old Bazaar in Skopje, North Macedonia

Coordinates: 42°00′09″N 21°26′09″E

- Музеј на Република Северна Македонија; Muzeu i Republikës së Maqedonisë së Veriut
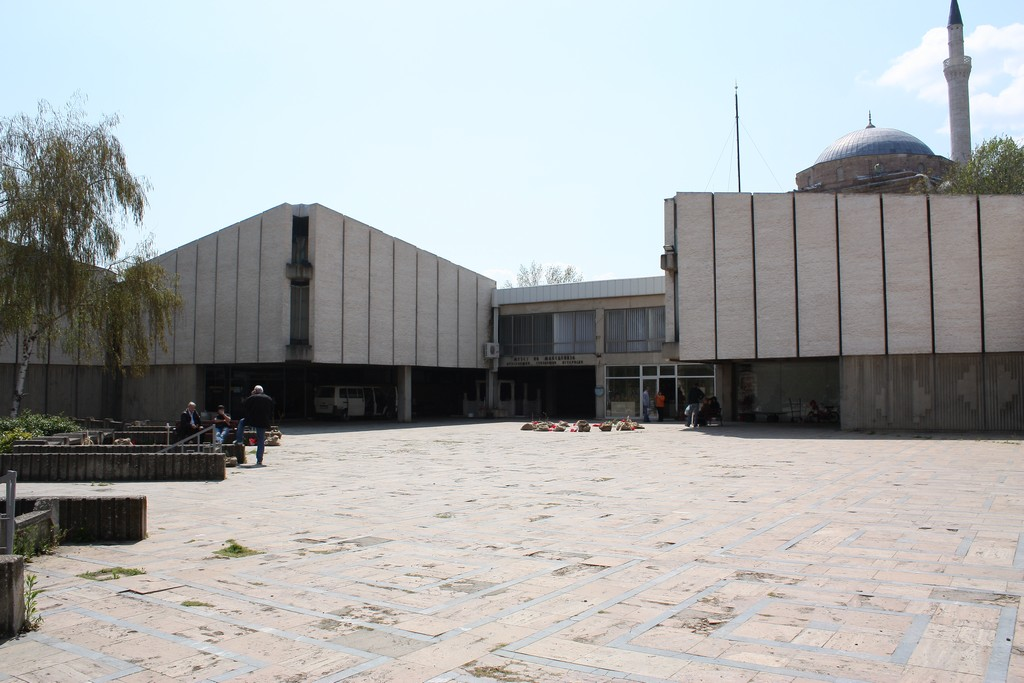
- The main building of the museum
- Established: 1924
- Location: Old Bazaar, Skopje, North Macedonia
- Type: National
- Website: museum.org.mk

The Museum of the Republic of North Macedonia (Macedonian: Музеј на Република Северна Македонија, Albanian: Muzeu i Republikës së Maqedonisë së Veriut ), formerly and still unofficially known as the Museum of Macedonia (Macedonian: Музеј на Македонија, Albanian: Muzeu i Maqedonisë), is a national institution in Macedonia and one of the oldest museums in the country. It is located in the Old Bazaar in Skopje, near the Skopje Fortress. The Museum of the Republic of Macedonia was created by joining three museums in one. The three museums that were unified were the archaeological, historical and ethnological museum, of which the archaeological museum was the oldest one; it was opened in 1924 and that date is considered as an establishing date of the national museum. During the existence of the Socialist Republic of Macedonia, the museum was known as People's Museum of Macedonia.

The museum has got total area of 10,000 m², of which 6,000 m² are meant for permanent or temporary exhibitions. The institution is complex in nature, which means it gathers, keeps, conserves and presents the national Macedonian historical and cultural heritage. Within the museum is the Kuršumli An, a historical monument that was built in the 16th century. Besides that, the museum takes care of the collections of the following institutions as well:

- the collections in the Palace of culture "Dragi Tozija" in Resen,
- the collections in the library "Iskra" in Kočani,
- the collections in the Palace of culture "25 May" in Valandovo, and
- the collections in the memorial houses in the villages Bituše, Galičnik and Gorno Vranovci.

== Sections ==
The Museum of the Republic of North Macedonia is divided into the following departments or sections:

- Department of Anthropology,
- Department of Archaeology,
- Department of Ethnology,
- Department of History,
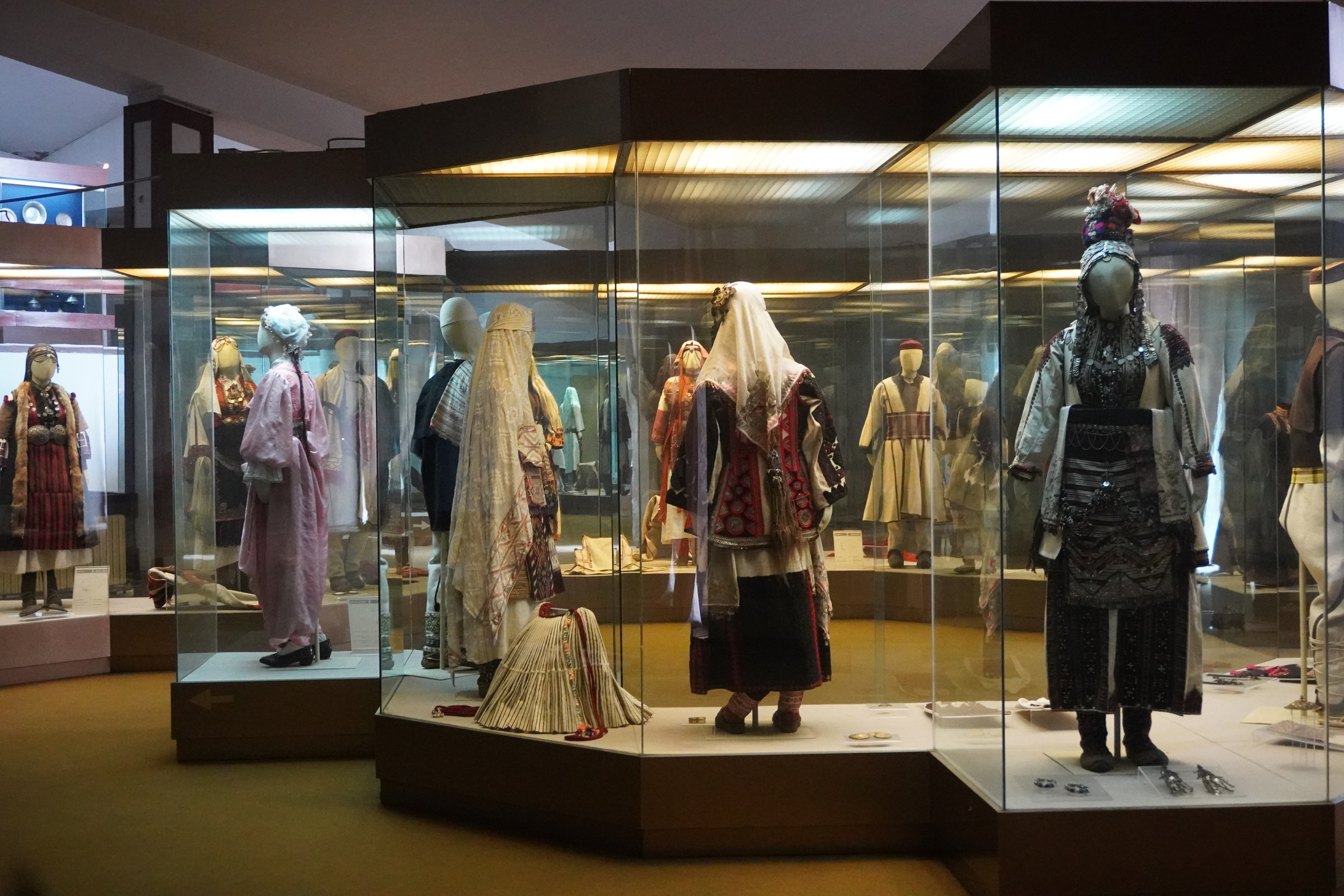
- A view from the traditional costumes exhibit
  Department of History of Arts,
- Department for conservation

== See also ==
- Archaeological Museum of Macedonia
- National Gallery (North Macedonia)
- Museum of the Macedonian Struggle (Skopje)
- List of museums in North Macedonia
