= Čifte Hammam =

Turkish bath in Skopje, North Macedonia

Coordinates: 42°00′04″N 21°26′14″E

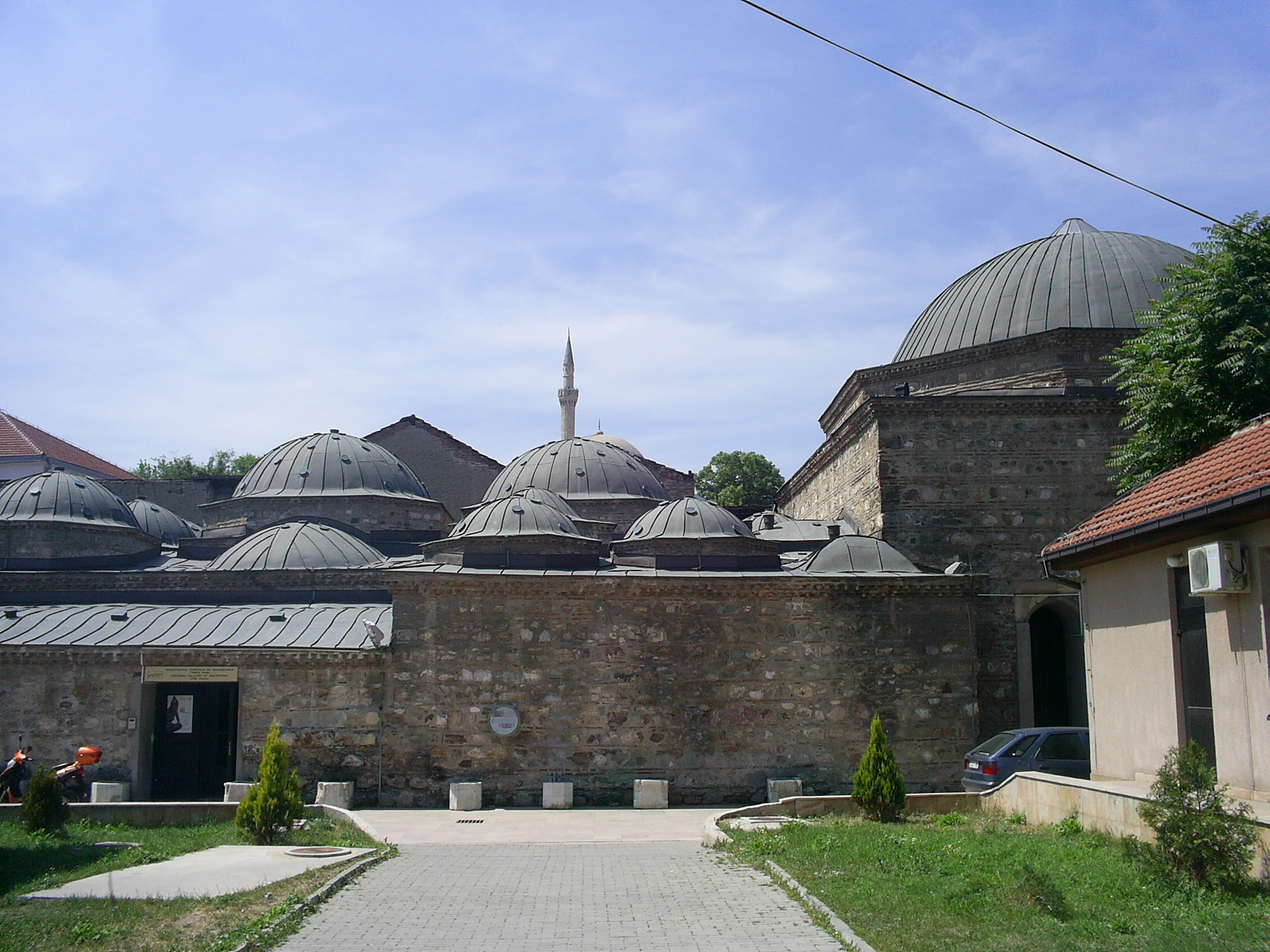
Čifte Hammam

Čifte Hammam (Macedonian: Чифте-амам, romanized: Čifte-amam, Albanian: Hamami i Çiftit, Turkish: Çifte Hamam) is a hammam in the Old Bazaar of Skopje, North Macedonia. It was built in the mid-15th century by Bosnian general Isa-Beg Ishaković in order to provide a regular source of income for his endowment.

== Etymology ==
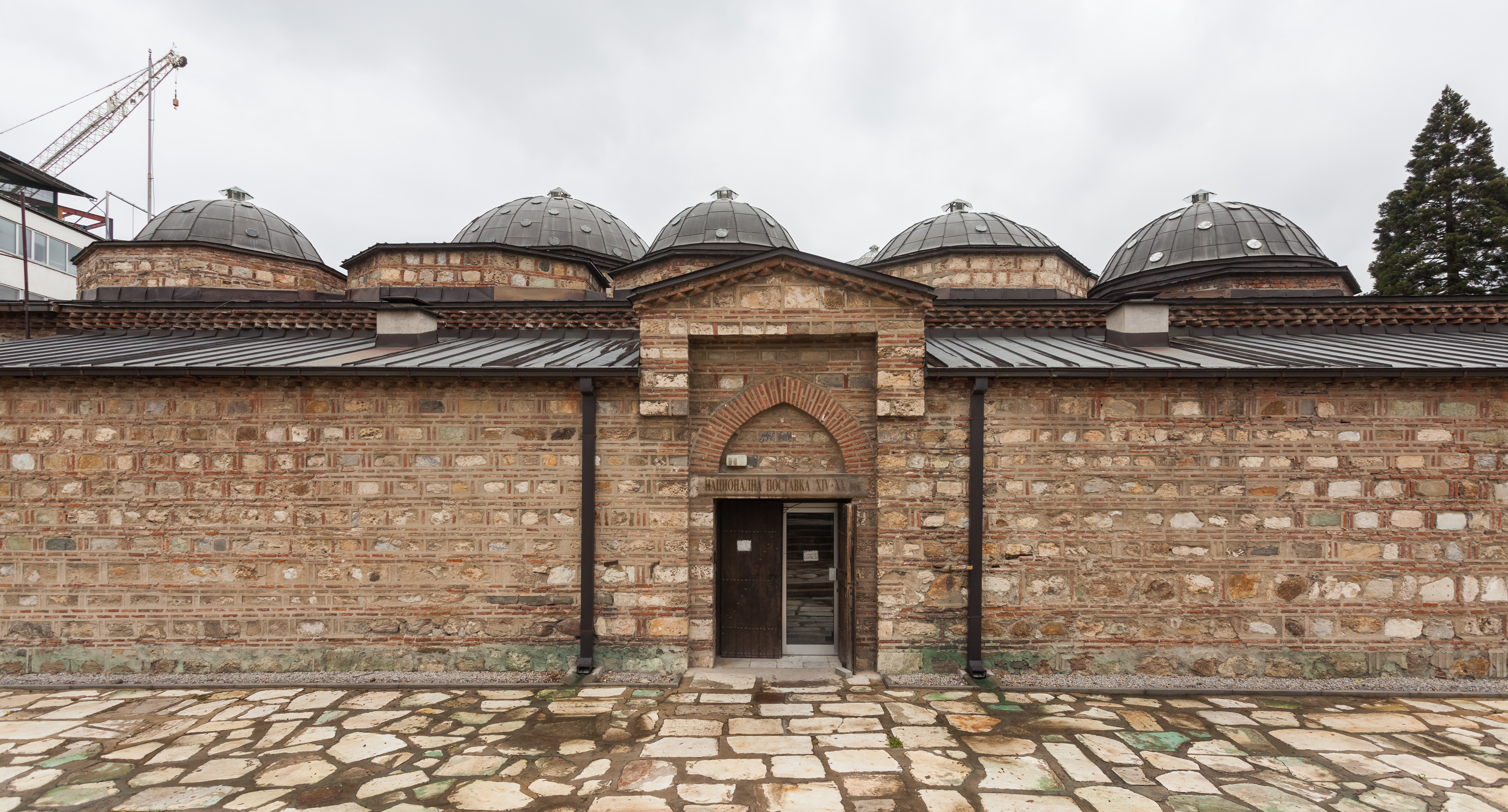
Front view

Name of the hammam is derived from the Turkish word "çift" meaning "two" or "couple" as the building consists of two main parts. Since 2001, the object is used for exhibitions as a part of the National institution.

== Characteristics ==
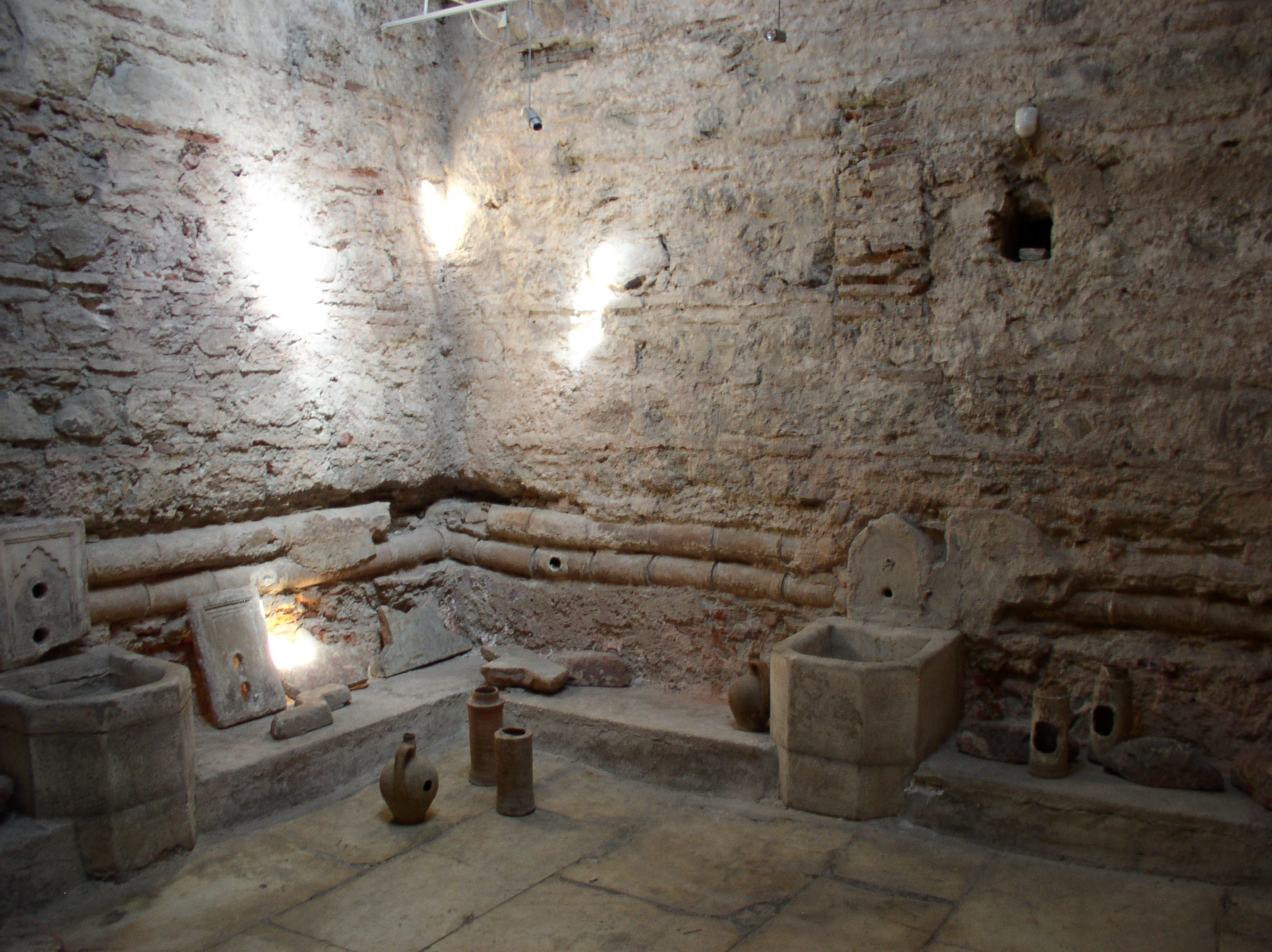
The bathing rooms are no longer operational

Male and female dressing rooms are apart with a joint bath area. There were three separate rooms with high temperature, of which one was constructed with a pool for ritual bath of the Jews in Skopje. Today it is not operational and houses part of the exhibition of the National Gallery of Macedonia whose head office is in multimedia center "Mala stanica". Daut Paşa Hammam is also part of the National Gallery of Macedonia.

== See also ==
- Hammam
- Old Bazaar, Skopje
- Ottoman Vardar Macedonia
