= Kuršumli An =

Ottoman caravanserai in Skopje, North Macedonia

Coordinates: 42.0031°N 21.4369°E

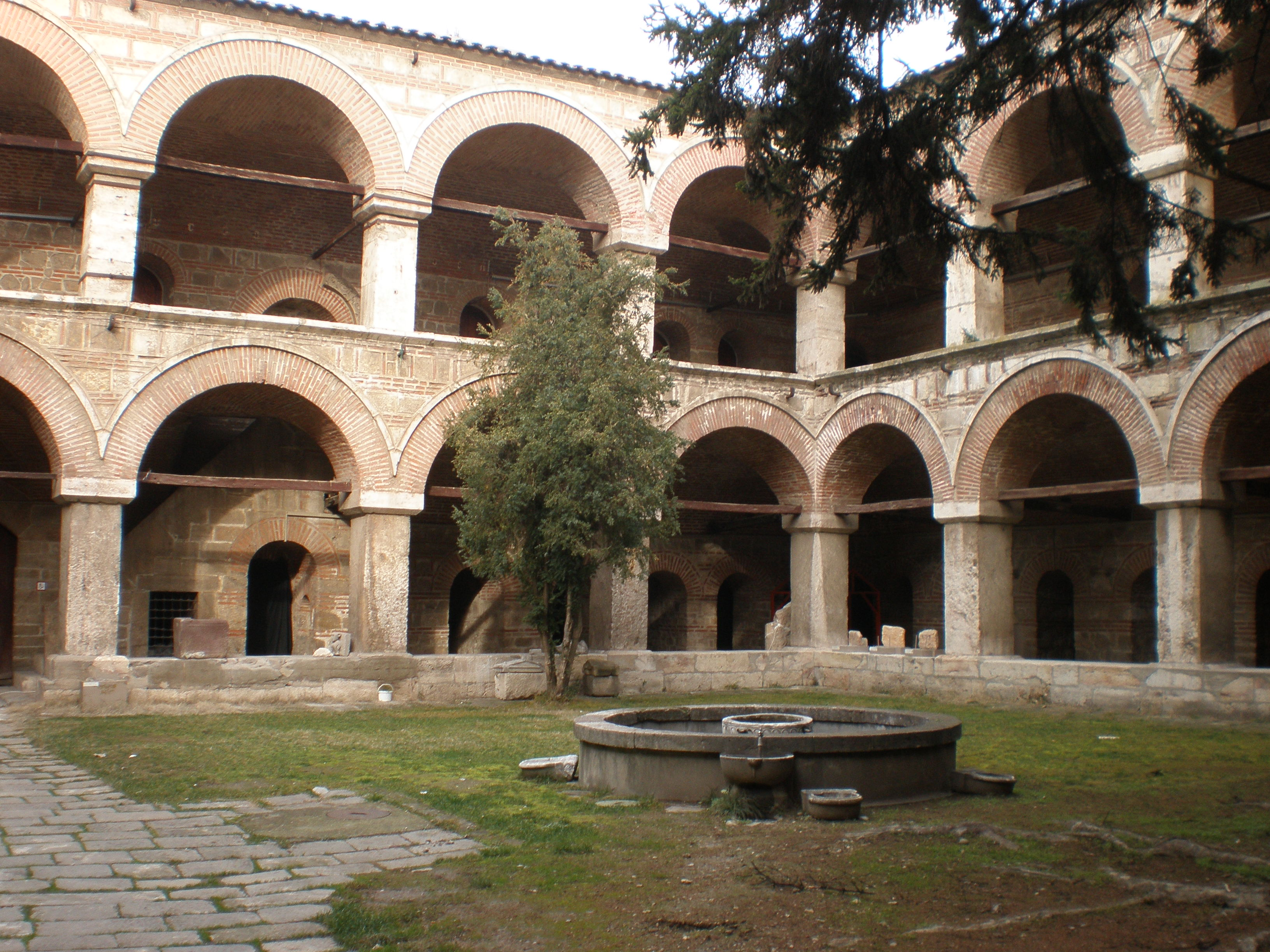

Kursumli An (Macedonian: Куршумли ан, Albanian: hani i Kurshumlis, Turkish: Kurşunlu han) is an Ottoman caravanserai located in the Old Town of Skopje. It is in the area of Museum of Macedonia. It has served as an inn and as a prison.

Kursumli An was built in the 15th or 16th century. There were stables for 100 horses.

The walls form a square but roof consists of pyramid-shaped domes. The domes were originally covered in lead, and this is why the serai is called "Lead Bazaar." Ground floor rooms were used for storage, upper floor for sleeping quarters. The building also featured rooms for livestock.
