= Museum of the City of Skopje =

Museum in Skopje, North Macedonia

Coordinates: 41°59′27″N 21°25′46″E

- Музеј на Град Скопје (Macedonian); Muzeu i Qytetit të Shkupit (Albanian)

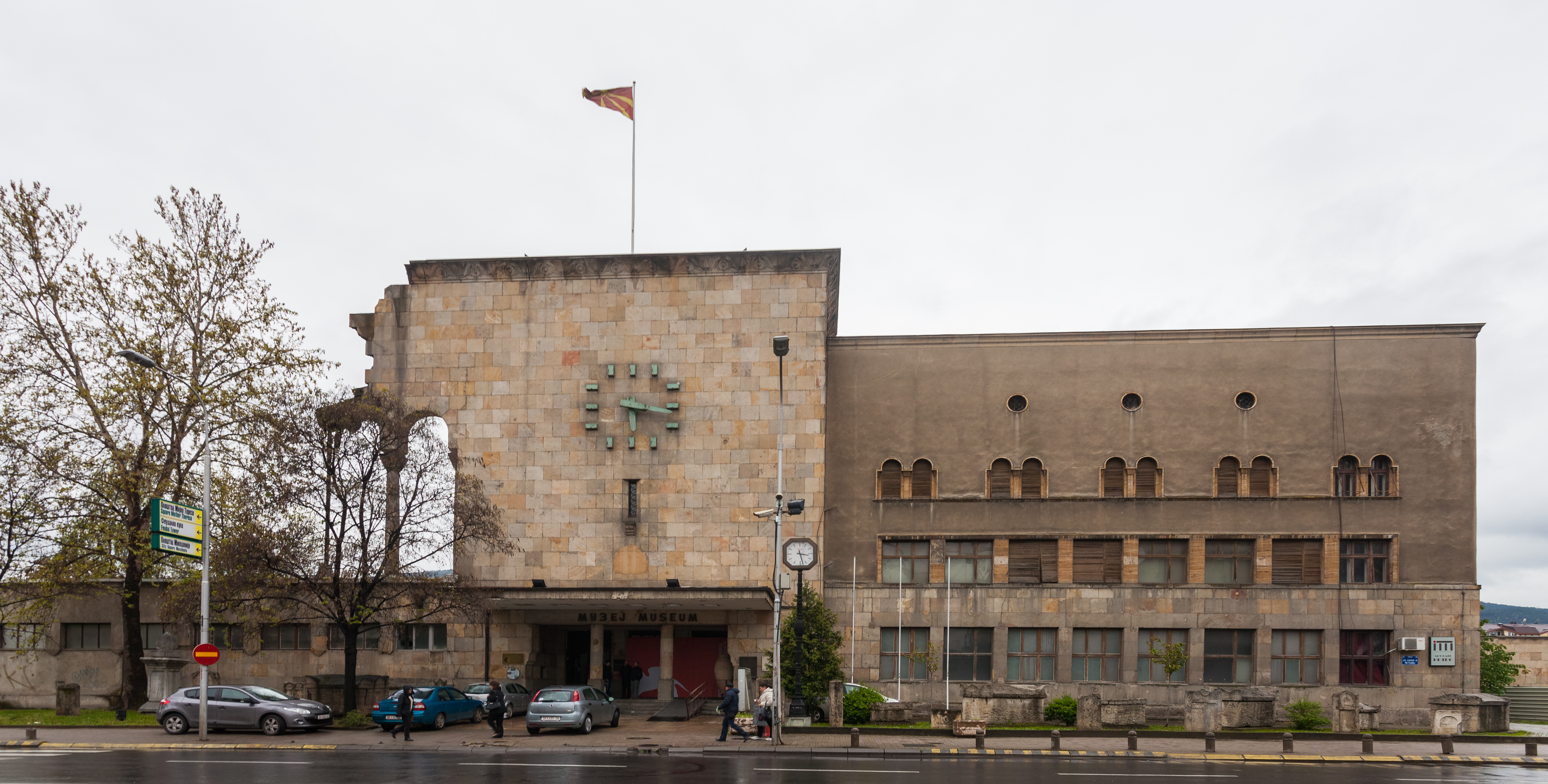
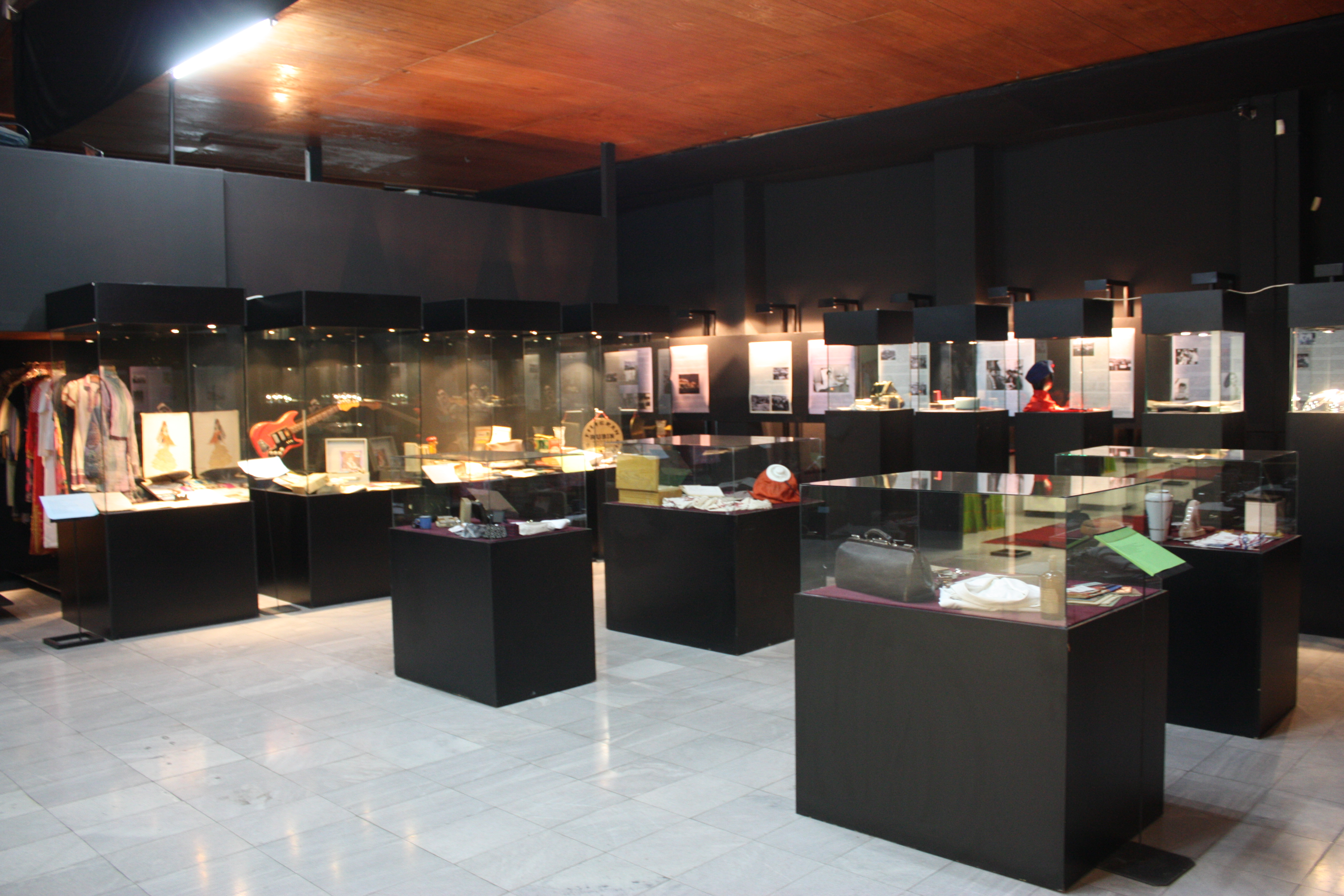
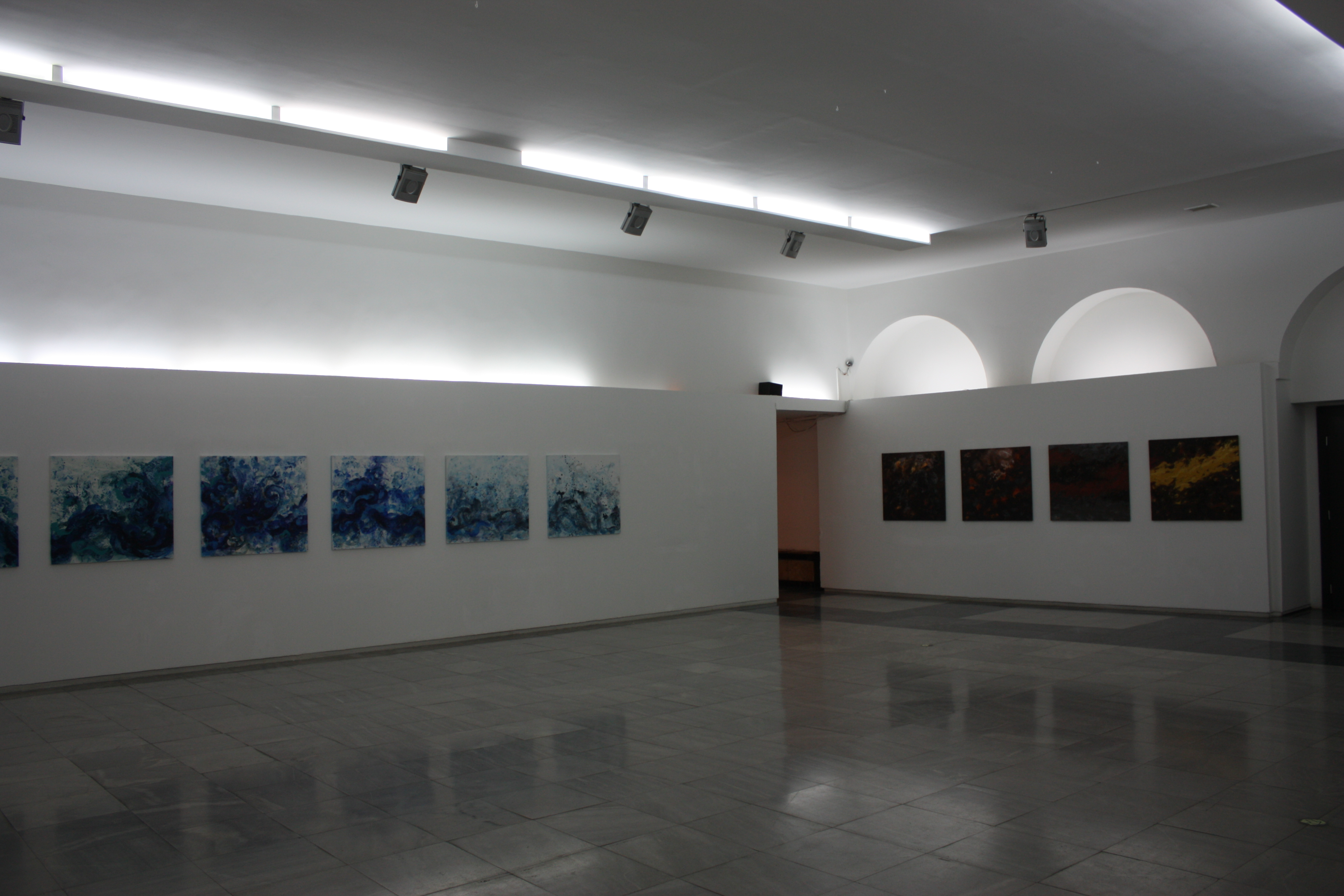
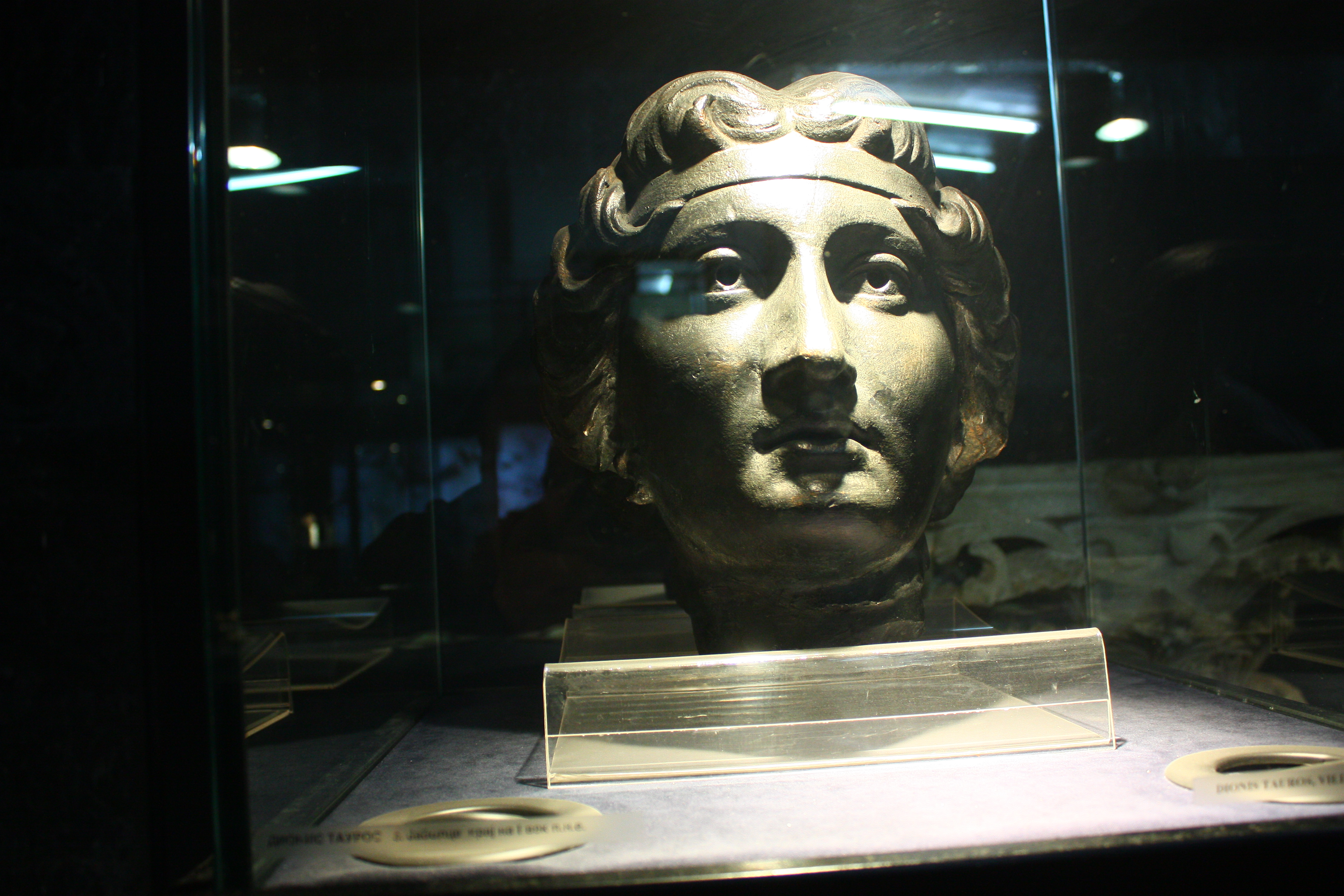
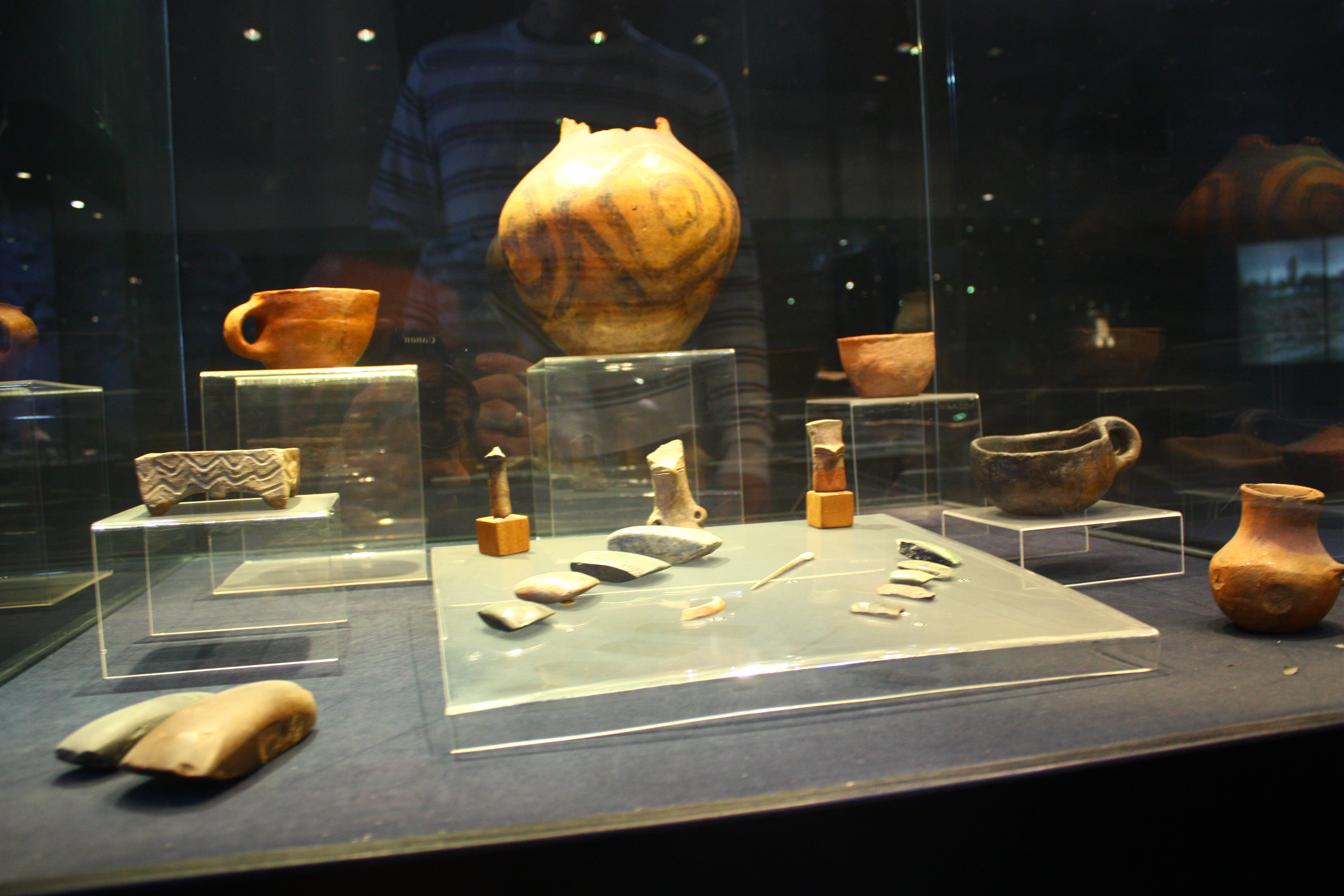
- Main building (Old train station building before 1963 Skopje earthquake) Ethnological section Art history section Dionysius Archaeological section
- Former name: People's Museum of the City of Skopje
- Established: 1949; 77 years ago
- Location: Skopje, North Macedonia
- Type: History museum
- Founder: People's Committee of the City of Skopje of the People's Republic of Macedonia

The Museum of the City of Skopje (Macedonian: Музеј на Град Скопје, romanized: Muzej na Grad Skopje, Albanian: Muzeu i Qytetit të Shkupit) is a complex city museum focusing on Skopje, capital of North Macedonia, development from its origins to the modern era. The museum is home to permanent еxhibitions representing the history of Skopje, from the first recorded settlements around 3000 BC to present.

The institution was established in 1949 by the People's Committee of the City of Skopje, capital of then newly established People's Republic of Macedonia, under the name of the People's Museum of the City of Skopje. The museum was opened in 1951 on the anniversary of the Macedonian Uprising.

Since 1970, the museum has been housed in a renovated section of the old railway station, which was heavily damaged in the 1963 Skopje earthquake. One-third of the building, which remained mostly intact, is now the main building of the museum. The museum occupies 4,500 m^{2}, with 2,000 m^{2} allocated for exhibition space.

== Collection ==
The museum's collection consists of 21,950 objects divided into four sections: archeology, history, ethnology, and art history. Notable donations to the museum include 182 photographs by Macedonian art photographer Blagoja Drnkov, a collection of traditional Japanese Ukiyo-e woodblock prints, and 159 works, primarily watercolors, donated by artist Lubomir Belogaski in 1991. The Belogaski collection, the first of its kind in North Macedonia, led to the creation of the Lubomir Belogaski Gallery, where his works are permanently displayed.

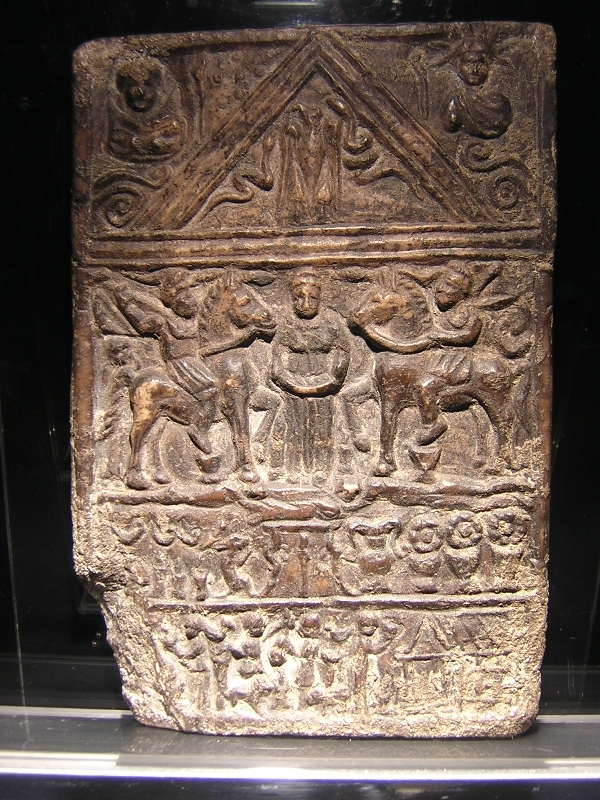
Antique stone

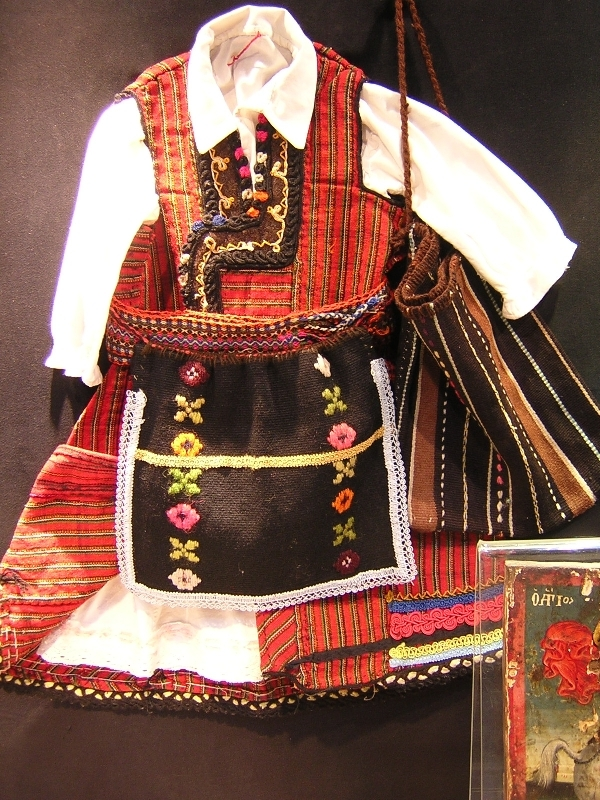
Traditional clothes

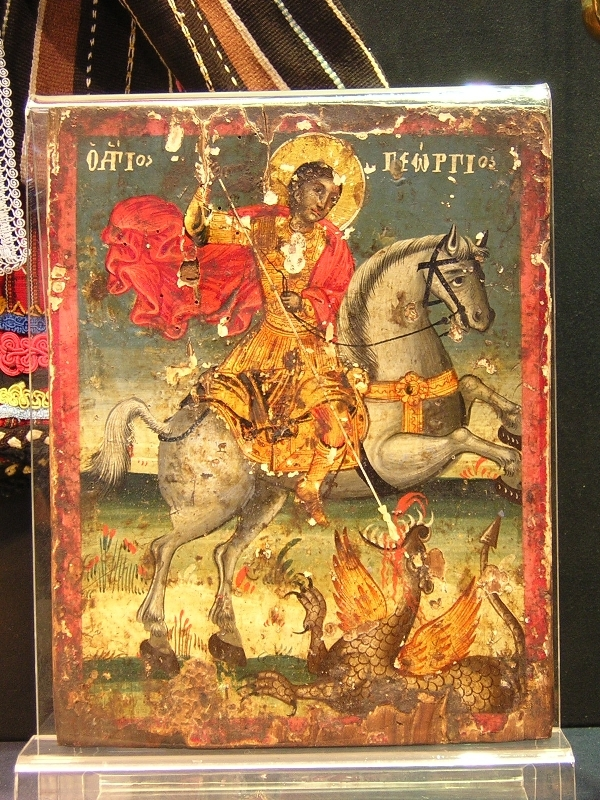
Eastern Orthodox icon

== History ==
The idea of establishing a City Museum in Skopje originated in 1935 when the municipal budget allocated 100,000 Yugoslav dinars for its development. The funds were intended for photographing important objects in the city, collecting museum materials, books, and images related to Skopje, excavating the ancient city of Skupi, and preserving old monuments. Additionally, the funds aimed to incorporate the collections of the "Museum of Southern Serbia" into a Skopje-based department. However, the creation of the museum was delayed due to political factors, as the authorities viewed it as a potential tool for fostering national consciousness and resistance against foreign rule.

After World War II in Yugoslav Macedonia, the City Museum of Skopje was officially established in 1949 by the City People's Committee, and it opened to the public on October 11, 1951, coinciding with the tenth anniversary of the Day of the Macedonian Uprising, proclaimed in 1945 as a national holiday. For nearly two decades, the museum faced challenges in securing an adequate building. Initially, it operated within the Cultural and Scientific Commission of the People's Committee of Skopje until 1952, when it moved to a dedicated space on 27 Mart Street in the city centre. In early 1956, it relocated to a portion of the former Turkish telegraph office, which later became a cultural monument. In 1962, a review of the city's cultural monuments led to the decision to move the museum's permanent exhibition to the Kuršumli An building, a 16th-century Ottoman structure in the old bazaar. However, before plans could be implemented, a devastating earthquake on July 26, 1963, damaged the building, forcing the museum to operate outdoors and under tents alongside the Ethnological Museum.

In 1964, a temporary Czech-style prefabricated building was set up near Kale fortress, funded with 320,000 dinars. By 1967, the museum was forced to relocate again due to urban planning projects, including the construction of the French Consulate. That same year, the museum developed a plan to either build a new structure or adapt part of the old railway station, which had become a symbol of the 1963 earthquake disaster. The plan was approved in 1968, and construction was completed in 1970, resulting in a building with 4,670 square meters of space. This included exhibition areas, a cinema hall, storage, workshops, offices, and technical facilities. The renovation cost 7.8 million dinars. On October 11, 1971, the museum reopened to the public, showcasing a thematic exhibition dedicated to the National Liberation War and marking the 30th anniversary of the 1941 Skopje revolution.

== Building ==
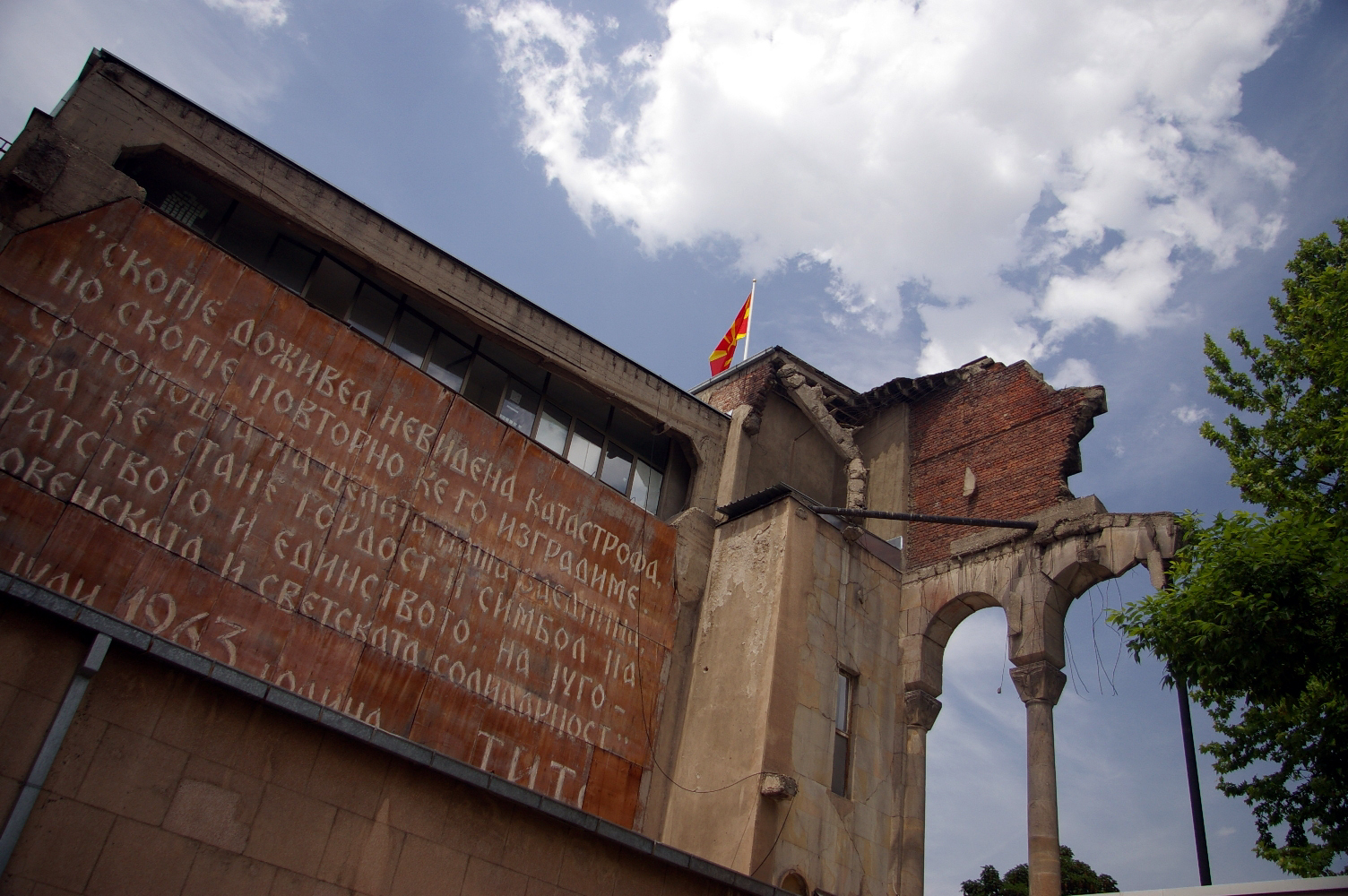
Destroyed section of the main building with post-earthquake speech by President of Yugoslavia Josip Broz Tito. Initially removed after the independence but later returned in 2018.

The museum is located in the old railway station building, which was partially destroyed in the 1963 Skopje earthquake. Initially constructed to replace the first station from 1873, it symbolized Skopje's modernization and expansion. Designed by Serbian architect Velimir Gavrilović, construction began in 1937, and the station officially opened in 1940. The building featured a monumental, symmetrical design with classical and Byzantine influences, notably a colonnade of arches on its upper floor. The so-called National Liberation War of Macedonia was commemorated by a mural by the artist Borko Lazeski, but it was later destroyed in the 1963 earthquake. In 1966, the remaining portion was adapted to house the Museum of the City of Skopje, with renovation work lasting until 1979. The building was marked by memorial to President of Yugoslavia Josip Broz Tito after the 1963 earthquake stating "We shall rebuild Skopje, comrade Tito". After the country gained in 1991 its independence, it was removed to museum depot during VMRO-DPMNE's rule, but the memorial was returned to its original location in 2018 during the reign of the Social Democratic Union of Macedonia.

=== Other buildings ===
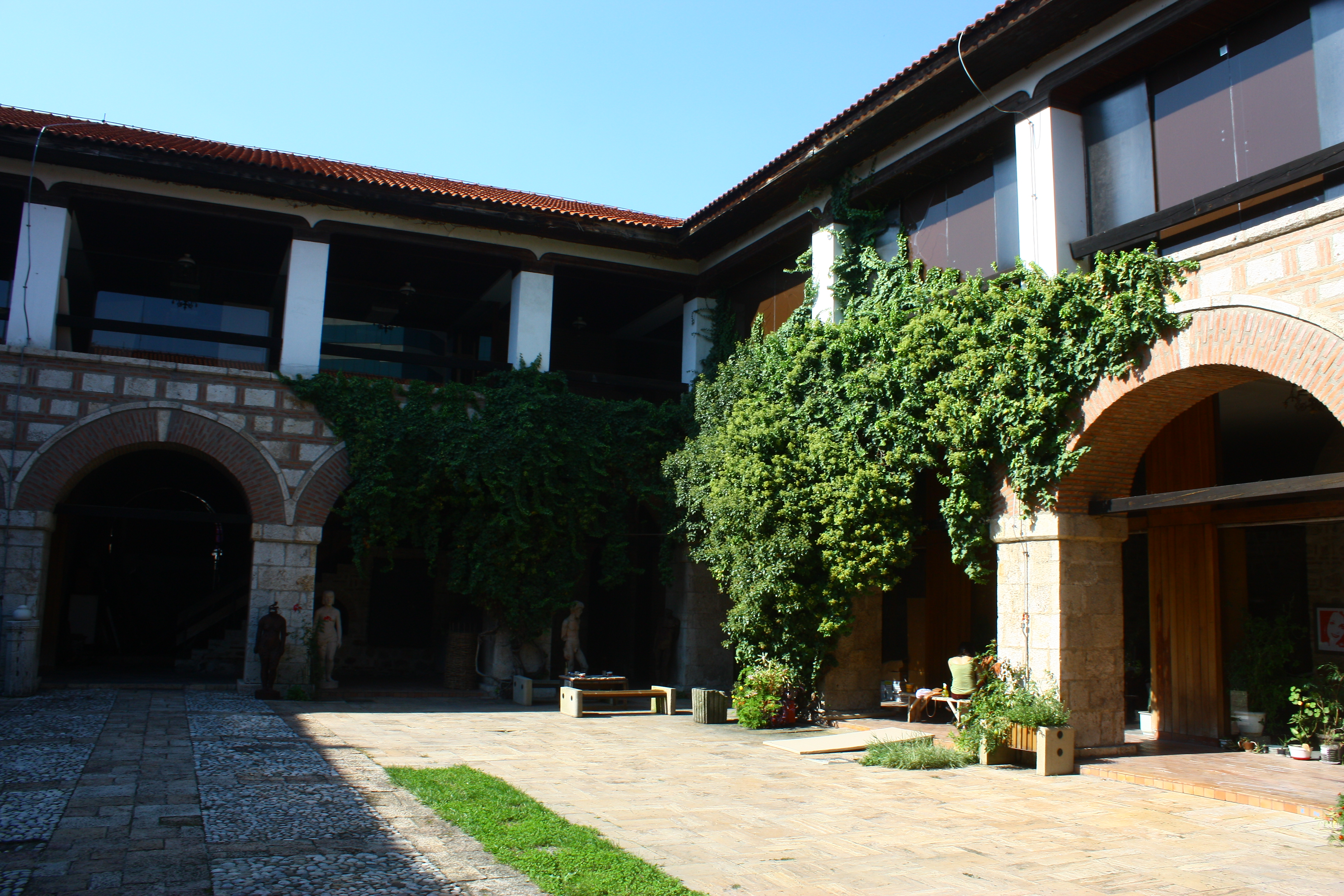
Suli An

Suli An, located in the Old Bazaar, houses the permanent exhibition History of the Old Bazaar. Additionally, the museum complex features several memorial museums, including the Memorial Museum of the Regional Committee of Communists in Macedonia and the Memorial Museum Workshop of Illegal Weapons from the Second World War.

== See also ==
- List of museums in North Macedonia
- Museum of the Republic of North Macedonia
