= Archaeological Museum of the Republic of North Macedonia =

Archaeological museum in Skopje, North Macedonia

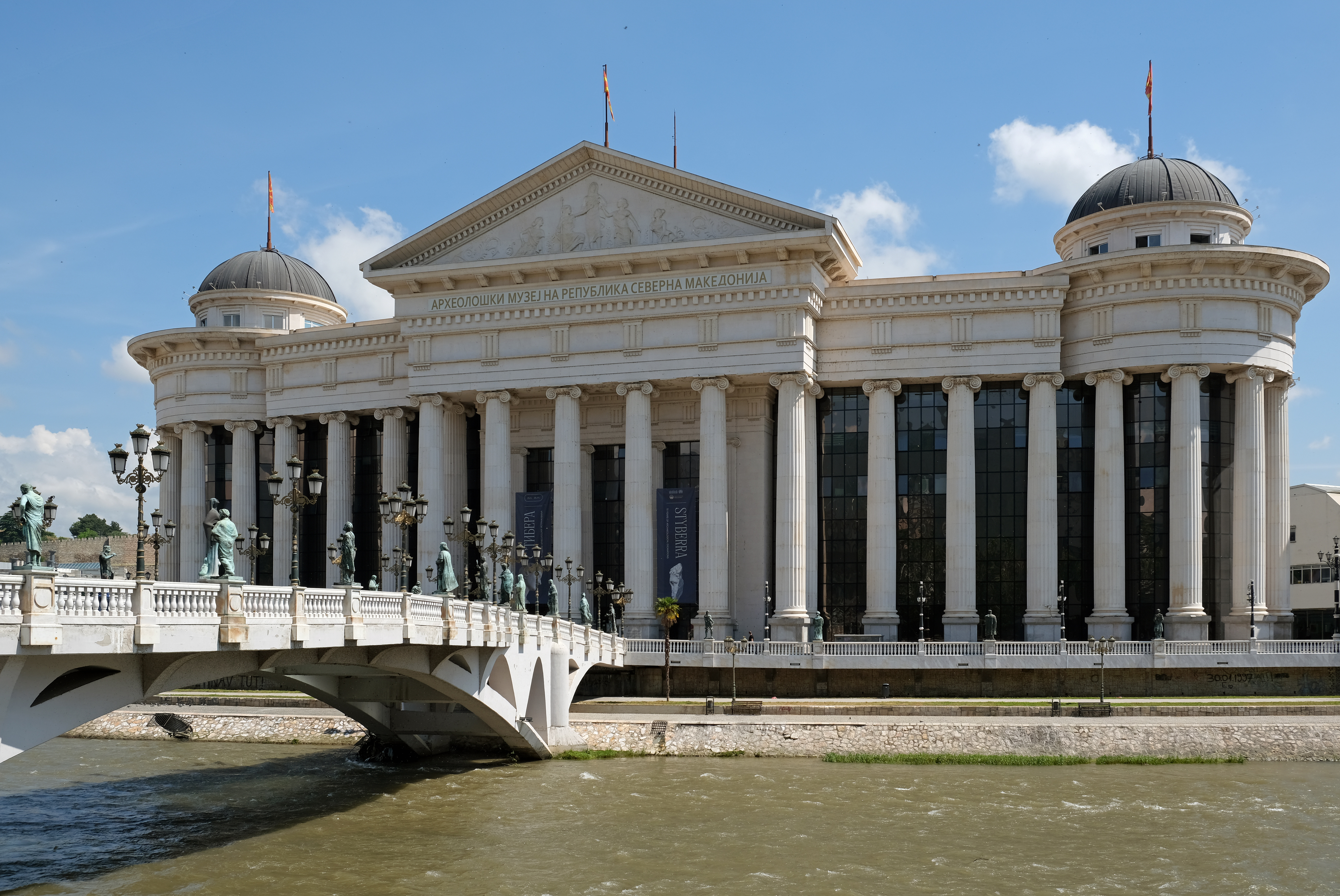
- Front view
- Established: 1924; 102 years ago
- Location: Skopje, North Macedonia
- Coordinates: 41°59′48″N 21°26′04″E
- Website: amm.org.mk/en/archaeologicalmuseum-of-the-republic-of-north-macedonia/

The Archaeological Museum of the Republic of North Macedonia (Macedonian: Археолошки музеј на Северна Македонија) is a archaeological museum in Skopje, North Macedonia.

== History ==
The first archaeological collection was established in 1920 within the Faculty of Philosophy at Ss. Cyril and Methodius University of Skopje. In 1924, a history and archaeology museum featuring a stone artifact exhibition hall was established on Kuršumli Street.

Following the 1963 Skopje earthquake, the Archaeological Museum was temporarily housed in the barracks at Kuršumli An from 1963 to 1977. A new museum complex opened in 1976 and served as the Archaeological Museum until 2014.

The new building began construction in 2009 and opened in September, 2014. Although the building primarily serves as a museum, it also houses the Constitutional Court and the National Archive of the Republic of North Macedonia. It is situated on the eastern bank of the Vardar, across the river from Macedonia Square. The exterior of the museum is among the more monumental buildings of the project, with its Greek Revival architecture. VMRO-DPMNE, the ruling party, states the budget for the construction as 436,000,000 denars.
