= Museum of the Macedonian Struggle (Skopje) =

Museum in Skopje

Coordinates: 41°59′53″N 21°25′59″E

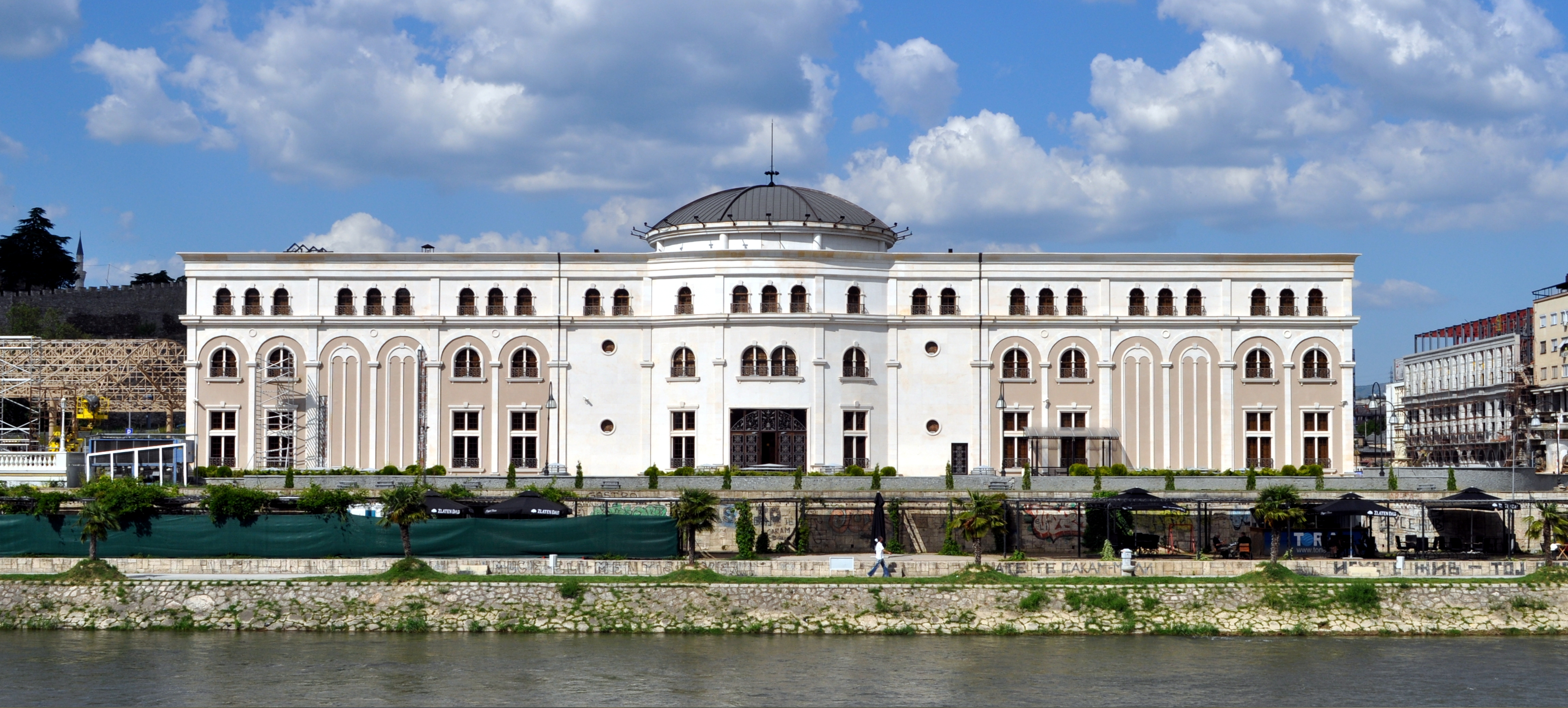
- Established: 2011
- Location: Skopje, North Macedonia
- Visitors: N/A
- Director: Ana Kitanovic
- Website: mmb.org.mk

The Museum of the Macedonian Struggle (Macedonian: Музеј на македонската борба, romanized: Muzej na makedonskata borba) is a national museum of North Macedonia located in the capital city of Skopje. Construction of the museum began on 11 June 2008 and it was opened to the public on the 20th anniversary of the declaration of independence on 8 September 2011. The building lies on the former location of the Skopje branch of the National Bank of Yugoslavia, between the Archaeological Museum of North Macedonia, the Holocaust Museum of Macedonia, the Stone Bridge and the Vardar River.

The exhibit covers the period from the beginning of the resistance movement against the Ottoman rule, until the declaration of independence from Yugoslavia on 8 September 1991. The guided tours take visitors through 13 exhibits ending in front of the original copy of the 1991 Declaration of Independence.

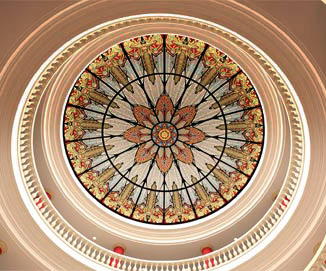
The main stained glass dome inside the Museum of the Macedonia Struggle

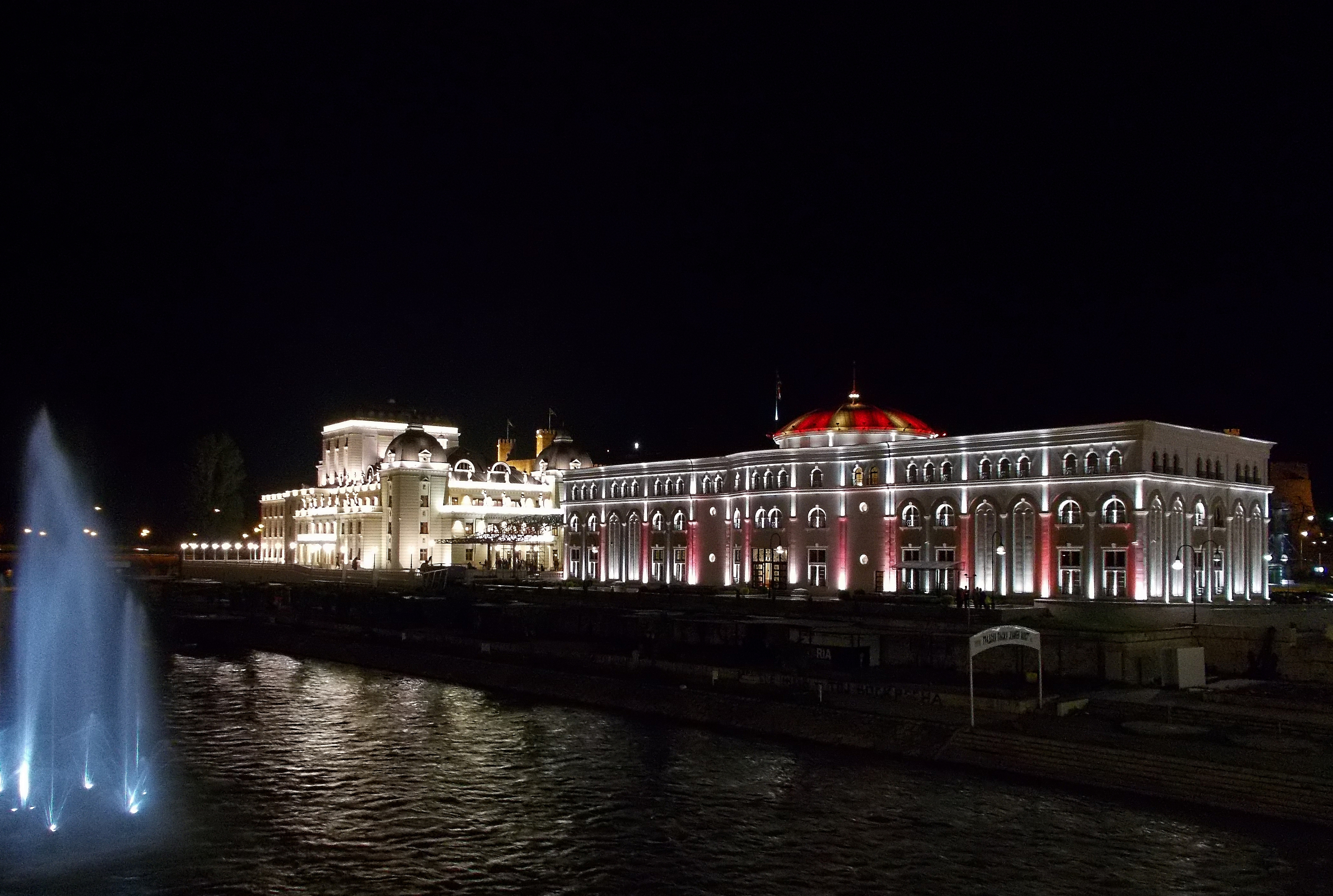
The museum at night, 2014

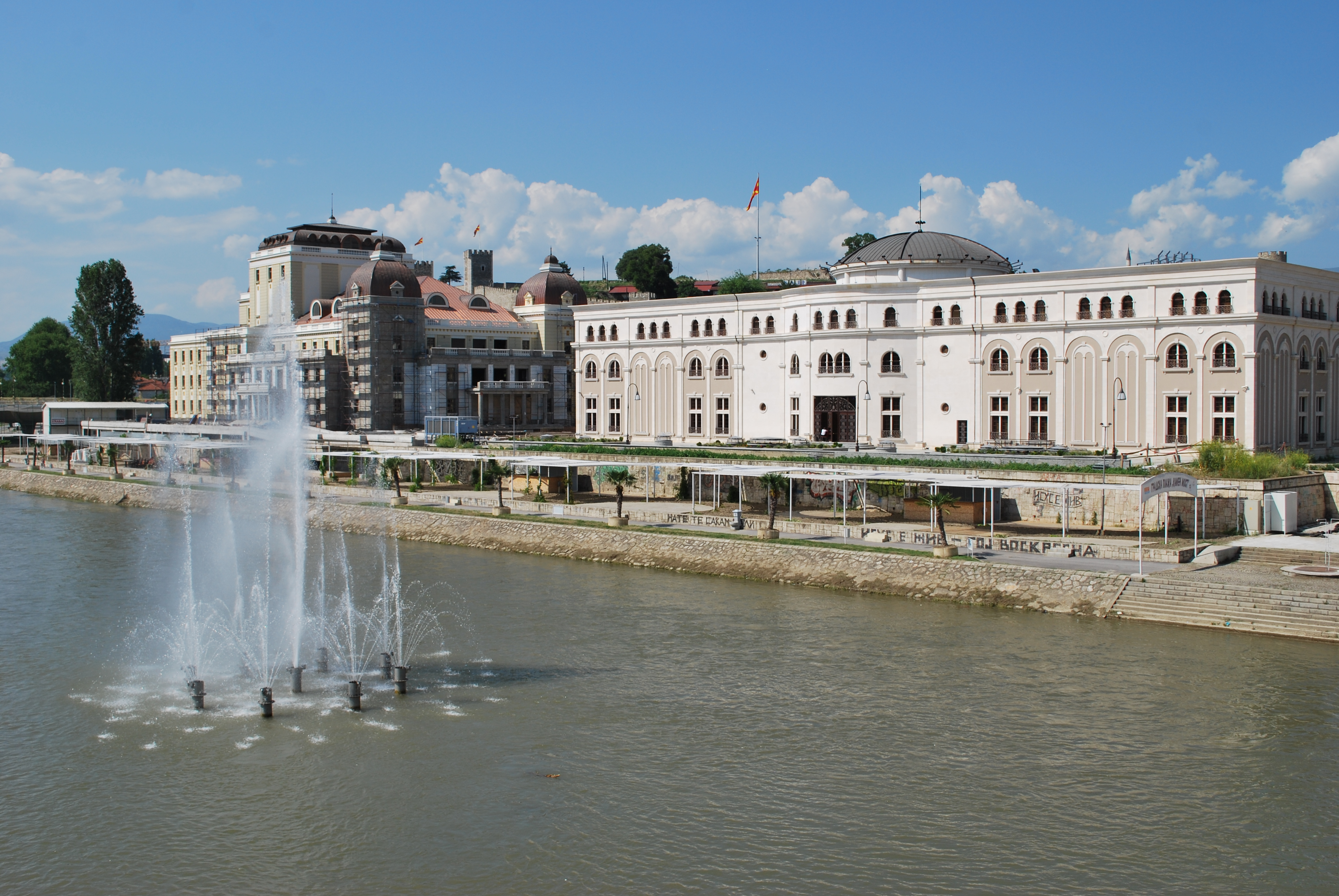
View from the other side

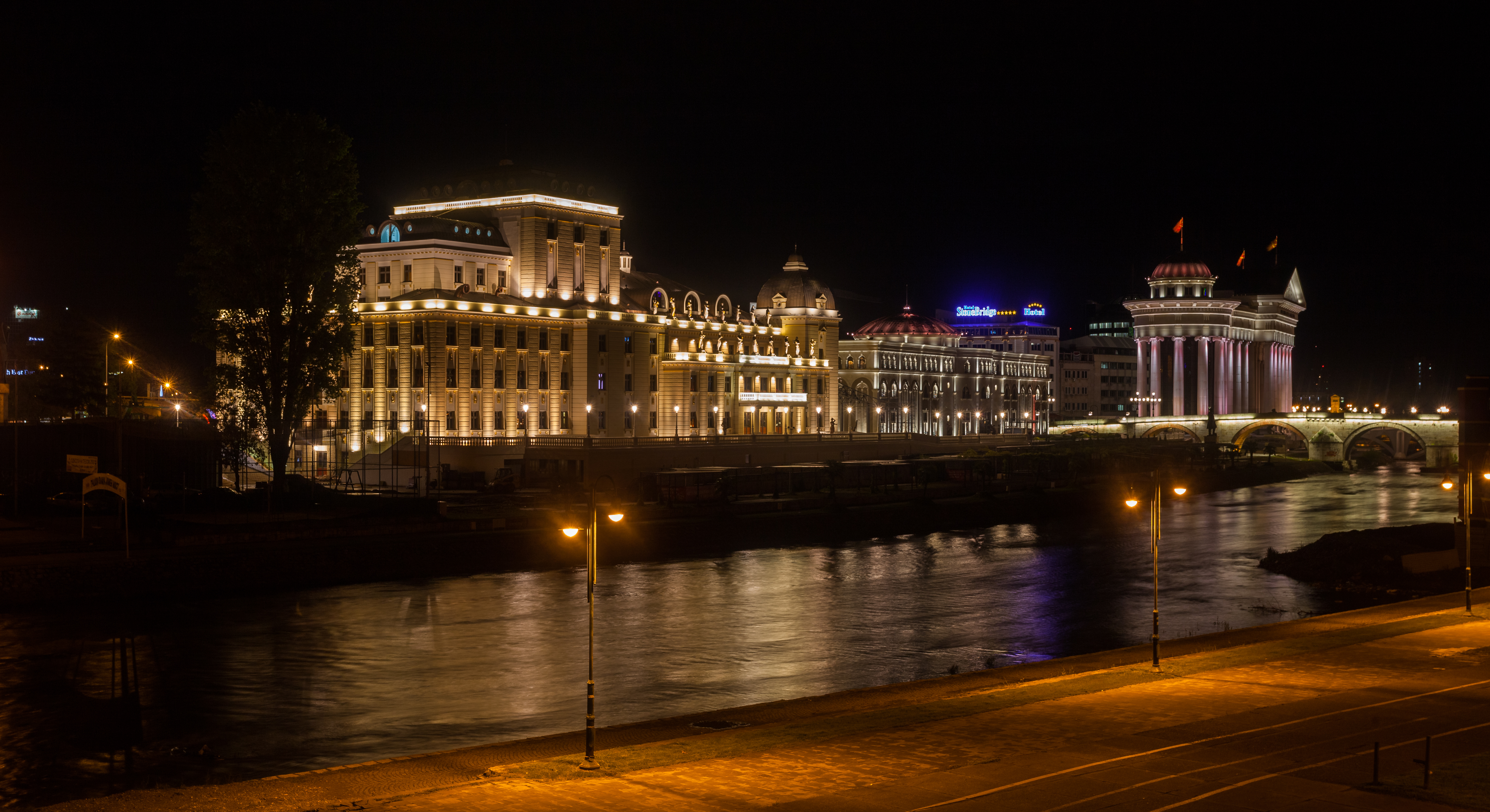
Night view of the museum and the National Theater
