= Holocaust Memorial Center for the Jews of Macedonia =

Holocaust memorial in North Macedonia

- Меморијален центар на холокаустот на Евреите од Македонија (Macedonian); Sentro Memorial del Holokausto de los Djudios de la Makedonia (Ladino)
- Museum exterior
- Established: March 10, 2011
- Location: Jewish Quarter, Skopje, North Macedonia
- Coordinates: 41.9984598°N 21.4333652°E
- Type: Holocaust museum
- Architects: Mirko Andovski; Nikola Boshku; EMAG Skopje
- Owner: Holocaust Fund for the Jews of Macedonia

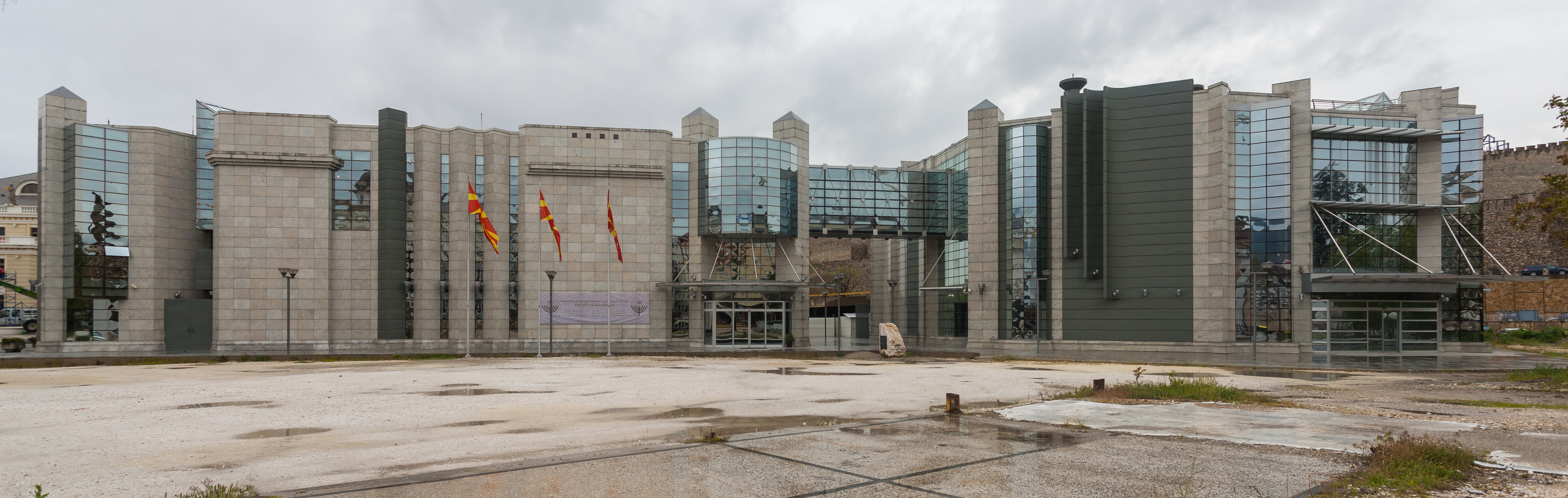
Panorama of the museum

The Holocaust Memorial Center for the Jews of Macedonia (Macedonian: Меморијален центар на холокаустот на Евреите од Македонија, Memorijalen centar na holokaustot na Evreite od Makedonija; Ladino: Sentro Memorial del Holokausto de los Djudios de la Makedonia) is a memorial to the Holocaust of the 7,148 Jews from North Macedonia and the history of the Jews in the Balkans, located in Skopje, the capital city of North Macedonia.

== History ==
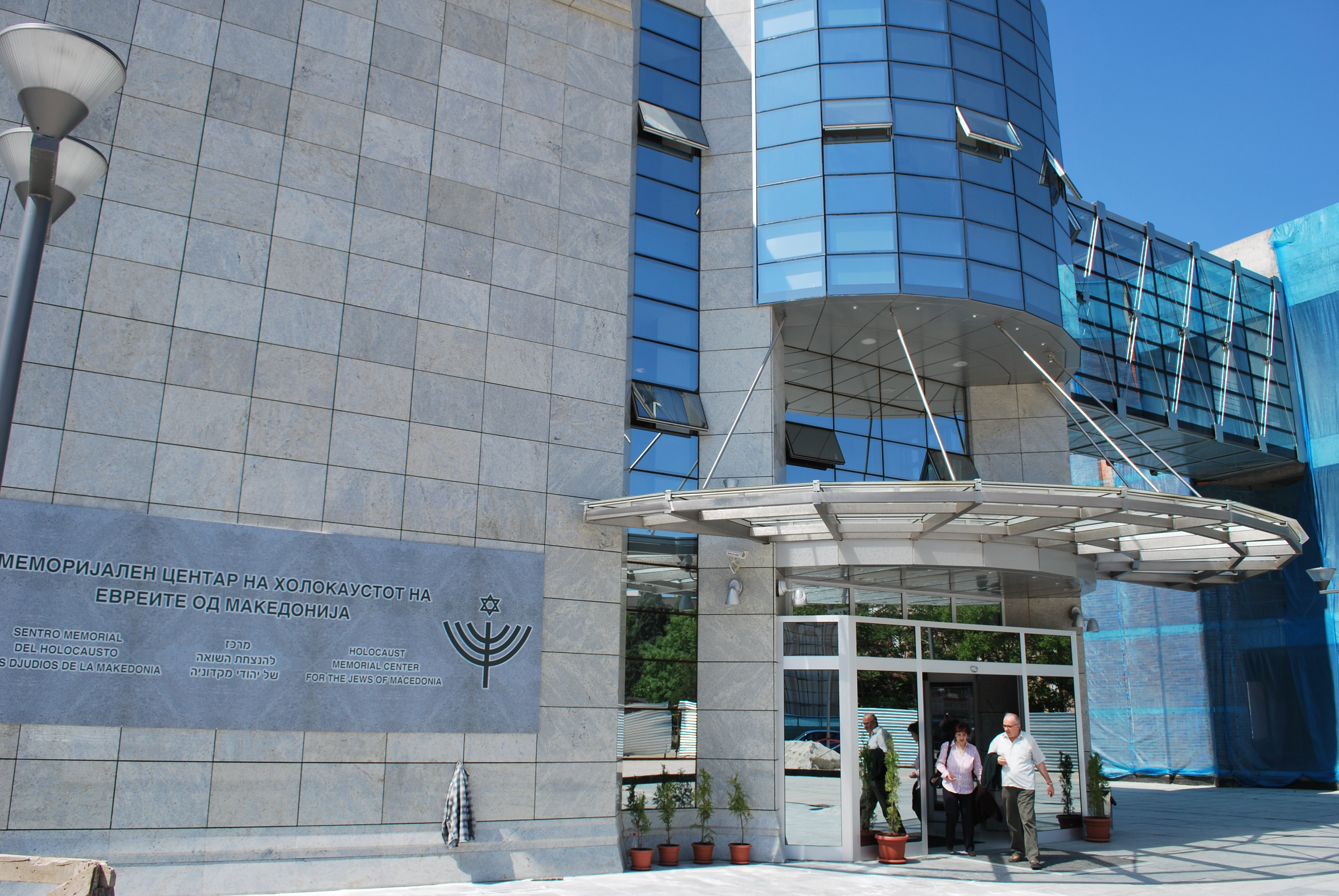
Museum entrance

The Holocaust Memorial Center is a multimedia center, consisting of several functional parts. Its construction works began in 2005. The Memorial Center is located in the Jewish Quarter of Skopje, known as Еврејско маало, which was the center of Jewish life in this city until the deportation of the Jews. The museum is located behind the Museum of the Macedonian Struggle, which faces the Vardar River.

=== Inauguration ===
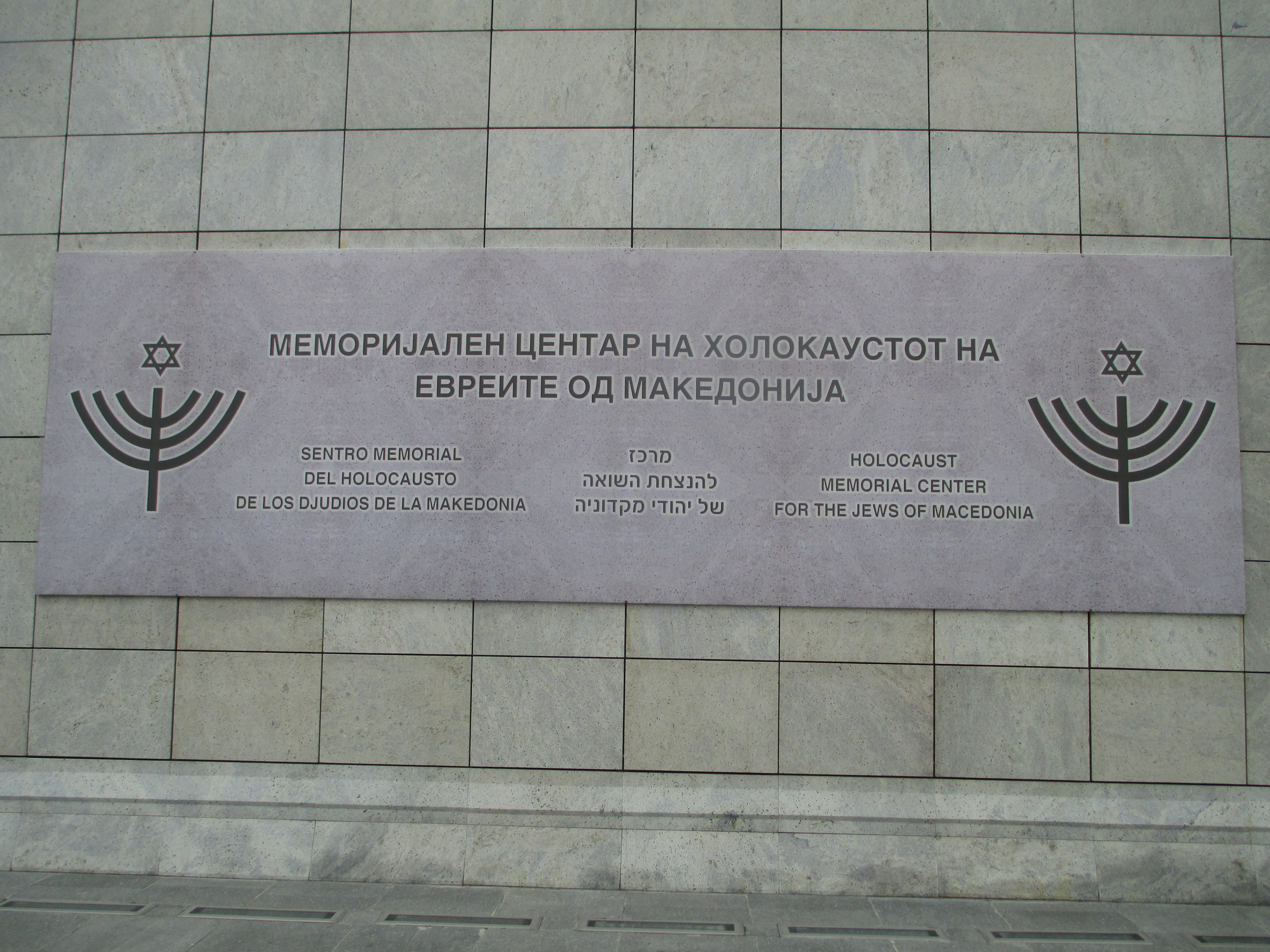
Sign at the entrance of the building in Macedonian, Ladino, Hebrew and English.

The Holocaust Memorial Center for the Jews of Macedonia was officially opened on 10 March 2011, exactly 68 years after the allied Bulgarian and German forces deported the Jews of present-day North Macedonia to the Treblinka extermination camp. The opening was attended by high-ranking officials from North Macedonia, Israel and other countries, notably the Prime Minister of the Republic of Macedonia Nikola Gruevski, the President of the Republic of Macedonia Gjorge Ivanov, Israeli Vice Prime Minister Moshe Ya'alon, the presidents of Montenegro and Albania, Filip Vujanović and Bamir Topi respectively, as well as a member of the Knesset, religious leaders and diplomats. Within three days of the memorial opening, it was visited by more than 3,000 people.

== Exhibitions ==
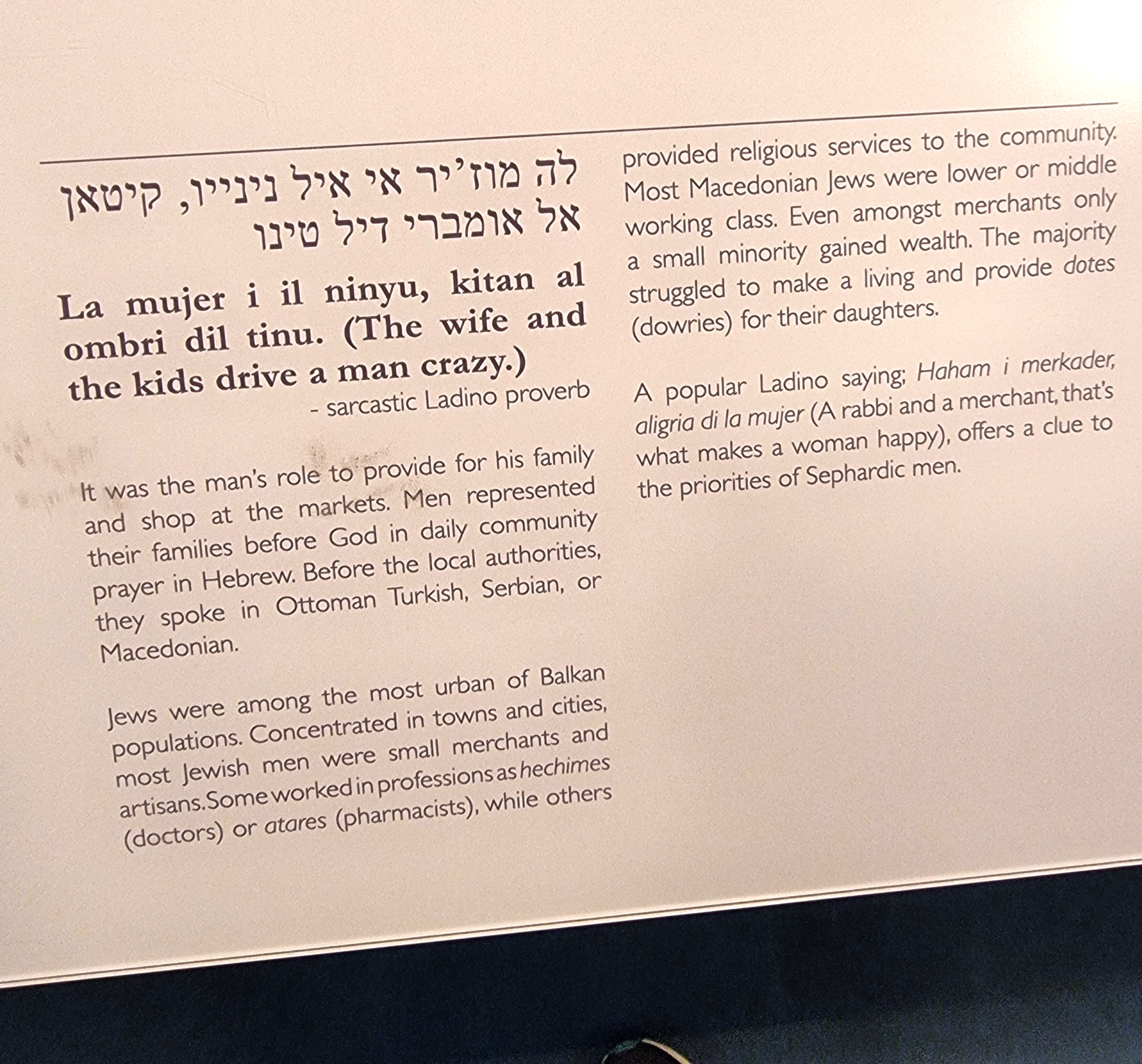
Sign with expression in Ladino at the Holocaust Memorial Center for the Jews of Macedonia, written in both Hebrew and Latin characters.

Among the exhibitions, there is a large section dedicated to the life of the Sephardic Jews in North Macedonia, which includes a segment devoted to Ladino, the vernacular language spoken by the Sephardic Jews in the Ottoman Empire, with phrases and expressions in the Monastirli accent.

== See also ==
- History of the Jews in North Macedonia § World War II and the Holocaust
- History of the Jews in Monastir § Monastir during the Holocaust
