= National Gallery (North Macedonia) =

National art museum in Skopje, North Macedonia

Coordinates: 41.9986°N 21.4356°E

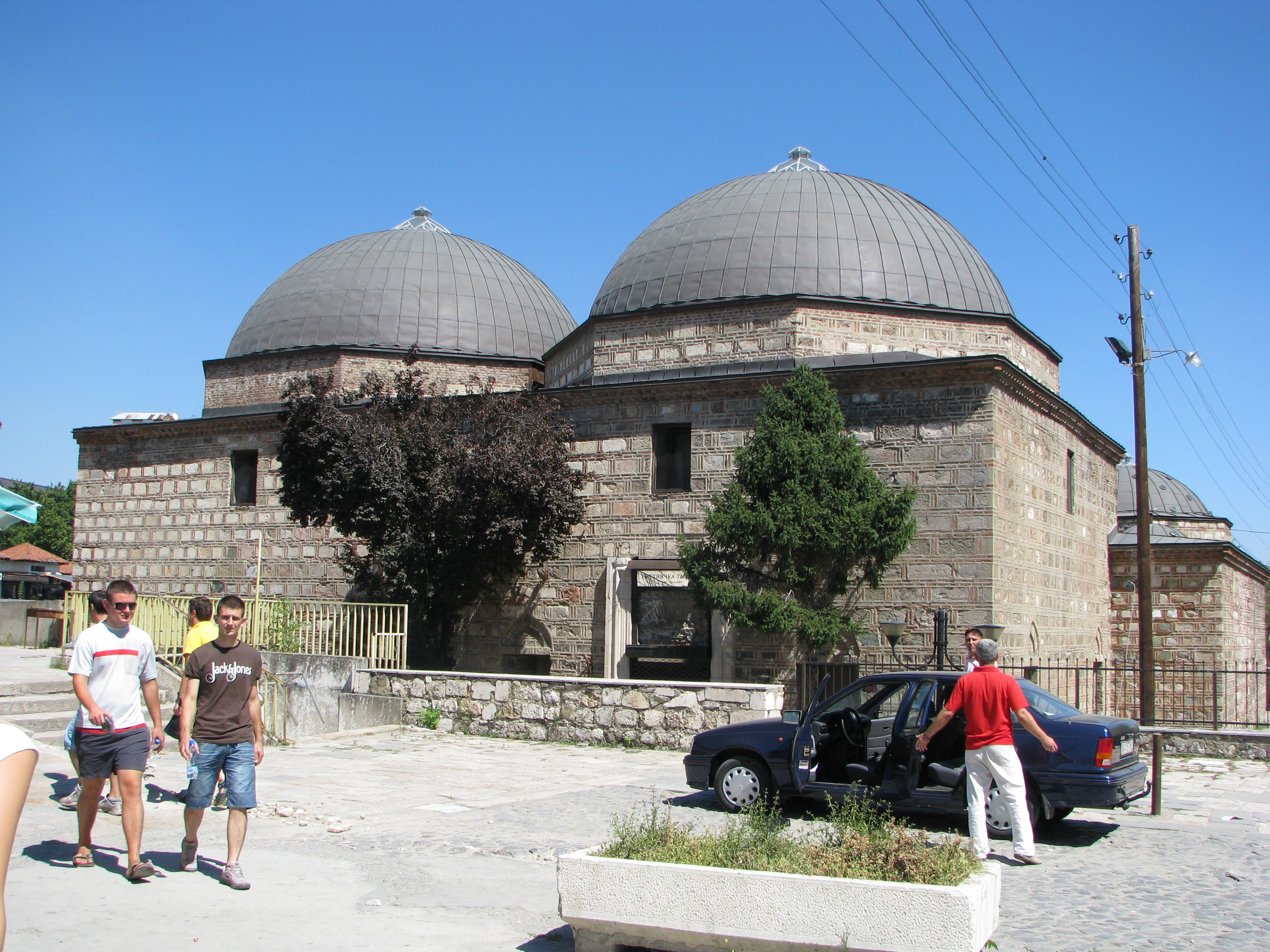
Daut Paşa Hammam now houses the National Gallery of the Republic of North Macedonia.

The National Gallery (Macedonian: Национална галерија; Albanian: Galeria Nacionale) is a national art museum of North Macedonia in the Old Bazaar, located in the capital city of Skopje. Its permanent collection is housed in the 15th century hammam (Turkish bathhouse building) known as the Daut Pasha Baths (Macedonian: Даут-пашин амам; Albanian: Hamami i Daut Pashës), but the museum also features a smaller exhibition at the nearby Čifte Hammam. Founded in 1948, the museum's collection dates from the 14th century. In addition to Daut Pasha Baths, it also includes three other facilities: the Mala Stanica Multimedia Center, the Čifte Hammam, and the Lazar Lichenoski Memorial House.
