= Jubilee in the Catholic Church =

Special year of remission of sins and universal pardon

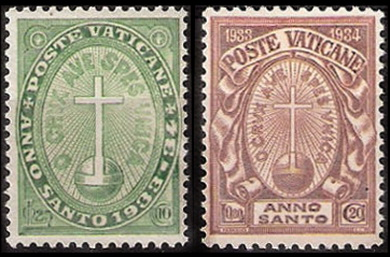
Vatican stamps of 1933 marking the holy year

A jubilee is a special year of remission of sins, debts and universal pardon. In the Book of Leviticus, a jubilee year is mentioned as occurring every 50th year (after 49 years, 7×7, as per Leviticus 25:8) during which slaves and prisoners would be freed, debts would be forgiven, and the mercies of God would be particularly manifest.

In Western Christianity, the tradition dates to 1300, when Pope Boniface VIII convoked a holy year, following which ordinary jubilees have generally been celebrated every 25 or 50 years, with additional "extraordinary" jubilees declared depending on the need. Catholic jubilees, particularly in the Latin Church, generally involve a pilgrimage to a sacred site, normally the city of Rome.

The most recent ordinary holy year was the Jubilee Year of Hope, which commenced on 24 December 2024 and ended on 6 January 2026. The present extraordinary holy year is the Jubilee of St. Francis, which commenced on 10 January 2026 and will be concluded on 10 January 2027. It is planned to have an extraordinary jubilee in 2033 to commemorate the 2,000th anniversary of the death and resurrection of Jesus.

== Biblical origins ==
In Jewish tradition, the jubilee year was a time of joy, the year of remission or universal pardon. Leviticus 25:10 reads "Thou shalt sanctify the fiftieth year, and shalt proclaim remission to all the inhabitants of thy land: for it is the year of jubilee."

The same concept forms the fundamental idea of the Christian jubilee. The number 50 was specially associated in the early 13th century with the idea of remission. The translation of the body of Thomas Becket took place in the year 1220, 50 years after his martyrdom. The sermon on that occasion was preached by Cardinal Stephen Langton, who told his hearers that this coincidence was meant by Providence to recall "the mystical virtue of the number fifty, which, as every reader of the sacred page is aware, is the number of remission."

In the Chronicle of Alberic of Three Fountains, under the year 1208 (rather than 1200), is this brief entry: "It is said that this year was celebrated as the fiftieth year, or the year of jubilee and remission, in the Roman Court." In Ancient Rome, it was said the jubilee was the celebration coinciding with the centenaries since the founding of Rome; this pagan celebration was co-opted into the tradition of the jubilee.

== Definition ==
In Roman Catholic tradition, a jubilee or Holy Year is a year of forgiveness of sins and also the punishment due to sin. It is a year of reconciliation between adversaries, of conversion and receiving the Sacrament of Reconciliation, "... and consequently of solidarity, hope, justice, commitment to serve God with joy and in peace with our brothers and sisters". A jubilee can be ordinary if it falls after the set period of years or extraordinary if it is proclaimed for some outstanding event.

== History ==
=== First Christian jubilee ===
In the face of great suffering caused by wars and diseases such as the plague, thousands of pilgrims came to Rome at Christmas in 1299. Cardinal Giacomo Gaetani Stefaneschi, the contemporary and counsellor of Pope Boniface VIII, and author of a treatise on the first Christian jubilee, noted that the proclamation of the jubilee owed its origin to the statements of certain aged pilgrims who persuaded Boniface that great indulgences had been granted to all pilgrims in Rome about a hundred years before.

On 22 February 1300, Boniface published the bull "Antiquorum habet fida relatio", in which, appealing vaguely to the precedent of past ages, he declared "... the most full, pardon of all their sins", to those who fulfill certain conditions. These are, first, that being truly penitent they confess their sins, and secondly, that they visit the basilicas of St. Peter and St. Paul in Rome, at least once a day for a specified time—in the case of the inhabitants of the city for 30 days, in the case of strangers for 15 days.

The word "jubilee" does not occur in the bull. The pope speaks rather of a celebration which is to occur every 100 years, but writers both Roman and foreign described this year as annus jubileus, and the name "jubilee" (though others, such as the "holy year" or "the golden year", have been used, as well) has been applied to such celebrations ever since. Among those who are recorded as among the pilgrims of that first jubilee are Cimabue, Giotto, Charles, Count of Valois, the chronicler Giovanni Villani, and Dante Alighieri, who mentions it in the Divine Comedy in Canto XVIII of "Inferno" and canto XXXI of "Paradiso".

=== Jubilee of 1350 ===
Boniface VIII had intended that the jubilee should be celebrated only once in 100 years. Before the middle of the 14th century, Bridget of Sweden and the poet Petrarch (among others) urged Pope Clement VI, then residing at Avignon, to change this. In 1343, Clement VI assented and issued the bull "Unigenitus", and set the time frame for every 50 years. In 1350, a jubilee was held, and although the pope did not return to Rome, Cardinal Gaetani Ceccano was dispatched to represent him. On this occasion, daily visits to the Archbasilica of St. John Lateran were enjoined, besides those to the basilicas of St. Peter and St. Paul outside the Walls.

=== Jubilees of 1390 and 1423 ===
In virtue of an ordinance of Pope Urban VI, it was proposed to hold a jubilee every 33 years as representing the period of the sojourn of Christ upon earth and also the average span of human life. The next jubilee was held in 1390, and the Basilica di Santa Maria Maggiore was added to the list. The visits to these four churches has remained as one of the conditions for gaining the Roman jubilee indulgence.

In 1400 so many people came to Rome that Pope Boniface IX granted the indulgence again, though he had not decreed a jubilee year previously. One of the most severe occurrences of plague during the Second plague pandemic was exacerbated by the many pilgrims making their way to and from Rome; in the city itself 600–800 of the faithful died daily.

Another jubilee was proclaimed by Pope Martin V in 1423 (33 years after the last proclaimed jubilee in 1390), but Pope Nicholas V, in 1450, reverted to the quinquagesimal period, while in 1470 Pope Paul II decreed that the jubilee should be celebrated every 25 years, and this has been the normal rule ever since. Paul also permitted foreigners to visit some specified church in their own country, and contribute towards the expense of the Holy Wars, as a substitute for the pilgrimage to Rome.

=== 15th century ===
The jubilees of 1450 and 1475 were attended by vast crowds of pilgrims, and that of 1450 was unfortunately made famous by a terrible accident in which nearly 200 people were trampled to death in a panic which occurred on the bridge of Sant' Angelo. Following this disaster, great pains were taken to widen the thoroughfares and to provide for the entertainment and comfort of the pilgrims by numerous charitable organizations, of which the Archconfraternity of the Holy Trinity, founded by Saint Philip Neri, was the most famous. In 1450, Rome was a largely rural area surrounded by the Aurelian Walls and inhabited by no more than 30,000 people engaged mainly in stock-rearing, in contrast with the economic centres of Florence, Venice, and Milan. Wolves frequented the Vatican Gardens, the population was centred on the Tiber near the Campus Martius, while round the churches of San Giovanni in Laterano and Santa Maria Maggiore were separate villages. Pope Nicholas V used the wealth brought in by pilgrims in the jubilee year of 1450 to convert the medieval city into a Renaissance capital, to found the Vatican Library, and to permanently move the papal seat to the west bank of the Tiber away from the Roman masses who had evicted his predecessor: the Vatican Palace and St Peter's Basilica thus replaced St John Lateran as the main papal headquarters. The nearby Castel Sant'Angelo was rebuilt, along with new fortifications encircling what is now the Vatican City, which Pope Nicholas made his home. According to Aeneas Silvius Piccolomini, 40,000 pilgrims arrived in Rome every day for the jubilee in 1450. With them came plague, and some members of the Curia died of the infection while the Pope himself fled Rome for Fabriano in the Apennine Mountains.

In 1500, Pope Alexander VI announced that the Holy Doors in the four major basilicas would be opened simultaneously, and that he himself would open the Holy Door of Saint Peter's. The celebrations around this were "founded on ancient rites and full of symbolic meaning" and the total number attending the initial jubilee events was, according to Johann Burchard, an estimated 200,000 people. This act definitively ushered in several customs. (Note: See Pope Alexander VI: The Jubilee (1500).)

=== 16th to 17th centuries ===
The ninth jubilee was solemnly opened on 24 December 1524, by Pope Clement VII, at a time when symptoms of the great crises which would soon tear the Church apart were already present, with the Protestant Reformation. The 1550 Jubilee was proclaimed by Pope Paul III, but Pope Julius III actually opened it. In 1575, in the time of Pope Gregory XIII, as many as 300,000 people came to Rome from all over Europe. The following Holy Year was proclaimed by Pope Clement VIII in 1600.

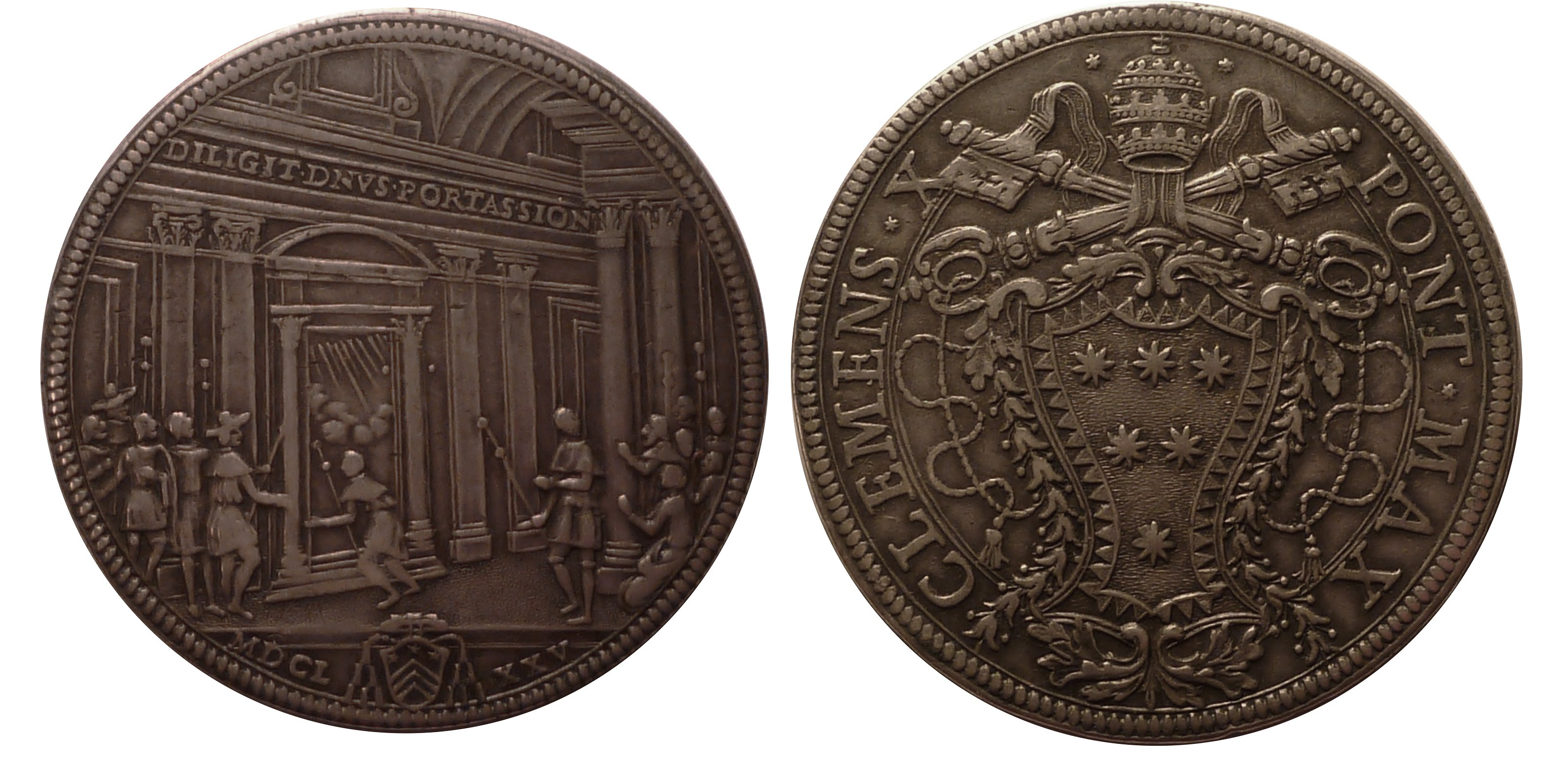
A piastre from the Holy Year 1675, issued under Clement X, mint of Rome, Papal States

In 1625, Pope Urban VIII opened the ceremonial doors for the jubilee year. However, the number of pilgrims was lower than expected due to the wars in northern Italy, so the Pope suspended the declaration of indulgences outside Rome in an attempt to lure the faithful to the city. He then went on to declare a universal or extraordinary jubilee in 1628 to pray for peace. This was repeated the next year in 1629, bringing material benefits to the city. Finally, Innocent X oversaw the last of his jubilees in 1650. Pope Clement X presided over that of 1675 and Pope Clement XI over that of 1700.

=== 18th to 19th centuries ===
Clement XI is remembered especially for establishing one of Rome's most renowned charitable institutions, the hospice of San Michele a Ripa. Gradually, other similar institutions were opened to offer shelter and assistance to pilgrims, as in 1725, the Holy Year called by Pope Benedict XIII. A famous preacher during the Jubilee of 1750, proclaimed by Pope Benedict XIV, was Leonard of Port Maurice, who set up 14 Stations of the Cross inside the ruins of the Colosseum. Benedict used the occasion of the Jubilee to celebrate the absolution and reconciliation of a number of former freemasons.

Pope Clement XIV announced the Jubilee of 1775, but died three months before Christmas and the Holy Door was opened by the new pope, Pius VI.

The difficulties faced by the Church during the hegemonic rule of Napoleon prevented Pope Pius VII from proclaiming the Jubilee of 1800, but more than a half a million pilgrims made the journey to Rome for the Jubilee of 1825. Pope Pius VIII declared a further two-week jubilee in 1829, celebrated in Rome from 28 June to 12 July, and over two locally determined weeks outside Rome. Pope Gregory XVI instituted a three-week jubilee over the period from 23 December 1832 to 13 January 1833 in celebration of the start of his pontificate.

The Holy Year could not be celebrated in 1850 because of the unsettled situation in the Roman Republic and the temporary exile of Pope Pius IX. However, he was able to announce a jubilee for 1875, but it was celebrated without any external solemnity, with only the clergy present for the inauguration. The holy doors were not opened, and the pilgrims who came were generally in Rome to do homage to the pope, who had not accepted the Italian annexation of Rome by the troops of Victor Emmanuel II of Italy, rather than to obtain an indulgence.

The Jubilee of 1900, though shorn of much of its splendor by the self-confinement of the pope within the limits of the Vatican, was, nevertheless, carried out by Pope Leo XIII with all possible solemnity.

=== 20th-century jubilees ===
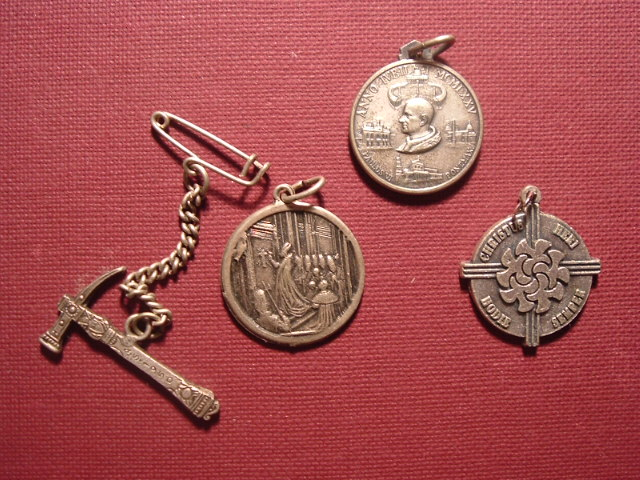
Souvenirs, the first two dated 1950, third one 1975, and the last one 2000.

In the 20th century, jubilees were held in 1925, 1933 (in commemoration of the 1900th anniversary of the traditional year of Jesus's death and resurrection), 1950, 1965 (post-Council jubilee), 1975, 1983 (for the Holy Year of the Redemption: the 1950th anniversary of Jesus's death and resurrection) and 2000.

Pope Pius XII used the occasion of the 1950 Jubilee to declare a new pontifical anthem for the Vatican City. With the encyclical Fulgens corona, he declared the first Marian year or "Little Holy Year" for 1954. Pope John Paul II proclaimed a Marian year in 1987, again four years after the 1983 Jubilee.

=== "Great Jubilee" of 2000 ===
Pope John Paul II announced a Great Jubilee for the year 2000 with his apostolic letter Tertio Millennio Adveniente (As the Third Millennium Approaches) of 10 November 1994. In this writing, he called for a three-year preparation period leading up to the opening of the Great Jubilee on 24 December 1999. The first year, 1997, was to be dedicated to meditation on Jesus, the second to the Holy Spirit, and the third to God the Father. This Jubilee was especially marked by a simplification of the rites and the requirements for achieving the indulgence, as well as a huge effort to involve other Christians in the celebration.

Protestants and the Eastern Orthodox Church were invited to celebrate the jubilee together with Catholics as a sign of ecumenism. Furthermore, special jubilees were invoked for various groups within the Church, such as children, athletes, politicians, and actors. World Youth Day, celebrated in Rome in August, brought over two million young people together.

The jubilee was closed by the pope on 6 January 2001, by the closing of the holy door of St. Peter's Basilica and the promulgation of the apostolic letter Novo Millennio Ineunte (Upon Entering the New Millennium), which outlined the pope's vision for the future of the church.

=== Extraordinary Jubilee of Mercy, 2015-16 ===
On 13 March 2015, Pope Francis announced a special jubilee on the theme of mercy to be held from 8 December 2015, until 20 November 2016, and formally convoked the holy year through the papal bull of indiction, Misericordiae Vultus (The Face of Mercy), on 11 April 2015.

=== 2025 Jubilee ===
The 2025 jubilee year commenced on 24 December 2024, also marking the 1,700th anniversary of the Council of Nicaea (325 AD). Pope Francis designated the 2025 Holy Year as a time of renewal in "A Holy Year for Hope". The Jubilee Year, opened by Pope Francis was closed by Pope Leo XIV, after Francis' death in April 2025 at age 88. The Jubilee Year attracted an approximate 33 million pilgrims to Rome, according to official data released by the Vatican. This amount exceeded initial predictions by the Roma Tre University, which estimated that a total of 31 million pilgrims would travel to Rome during the Jubilee Year. Archbishop Rino Fisichella, pro-prefect of the Dicastery for Evangelisation stated that, 'The Papal Basilicas and other centers of prayer—such as the Holy Stairs—recorded unprecedented attendance levels'. He further commented that 'Confessions increased, and the Jubilee celebration of complete forgiveness, the indulgence, has reached everyone'.

=== Extraordinary Jubilee of St. Francis, 2026–27 ===
On 10 January 2026, just 4 days after the close of 2025 Jubilee, Pope Leo XIV announced a special jubilee to commemorate the 800th anniversary of the Transitus of St. Francis of Assisi, which is being held from 10 January 2026 to 10 January 2027.

=== 2033 Extraordinary Jubilee of the Redemption ===
An extraordinary Jubilee Year in the Catholic Church that will be celebrated in the year 2033. Announced by Pope Leo XIV at the end of the 2025 Jubilee Year, it will commemorate the 2,000th anniversary of the Passion, death, and resurrection of Jesus.

== Ceremonial of the jubilee ==
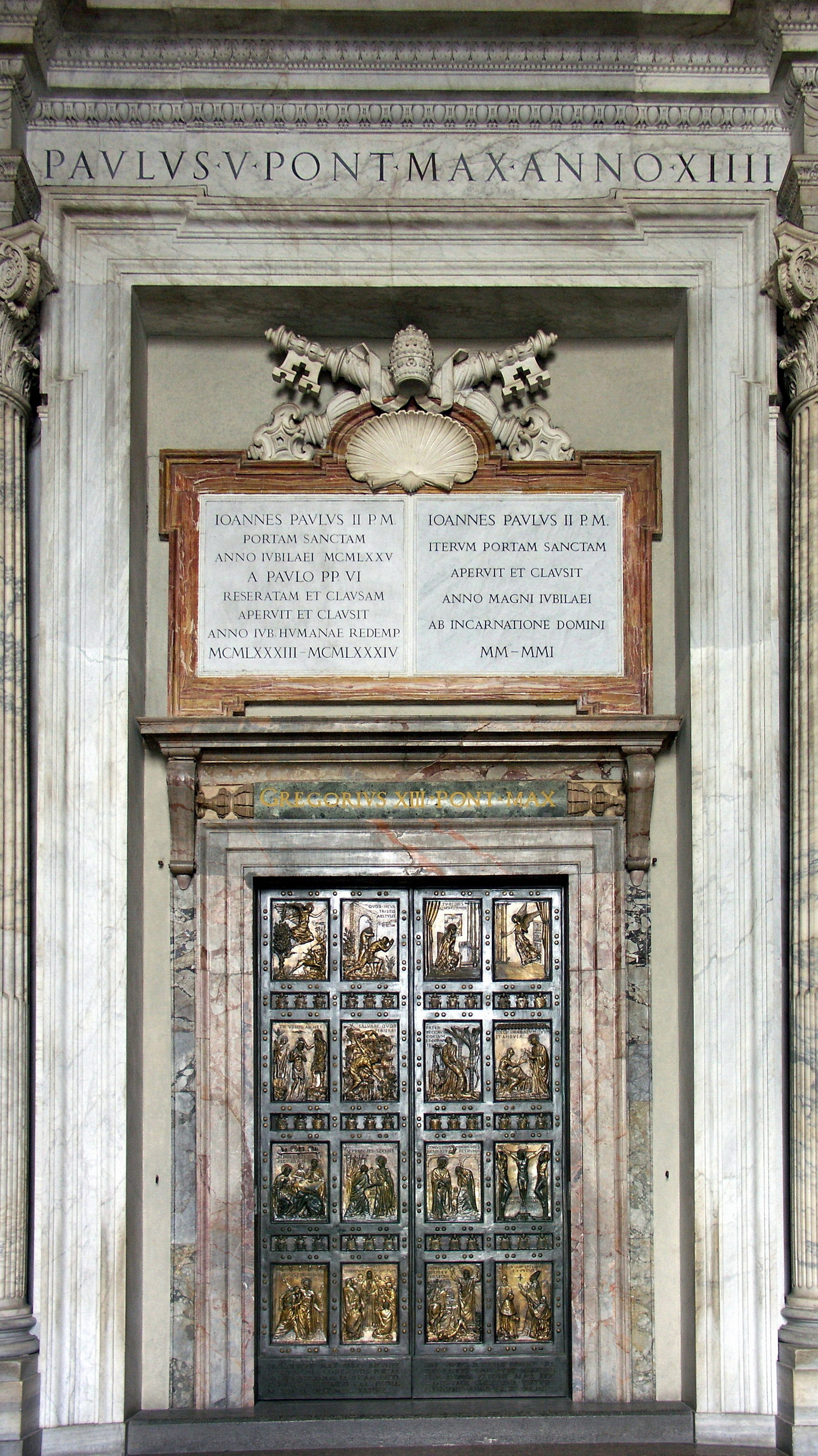
The Holy Door of Saint Peter’s Basilica by Vico Consorti, cast by Ferdinando Marinelli Artistic Foundry of Florence. The northernmost entrance of the basilica, the set of holy doors is cemented shut and only opened for Jubilee Years. The marble plaques above bear dates concerning Popes Paul VI and John Paul II.

The most distinctive feature in the ceremonial of the jubilee is the unwalling and the final walling up of the "holy door" in each of the four great basilicas which the pilgrims are required to visit. The doors are opened by the pope at the beginning of the jubilee and then sealed up again afterwards. Previously, the rite included the use of a silver hammer (for removing concrete at the opening) and a silver trowel (for sealing it again after the jubilee). The pope would pound on the wall, which would then be set to collapse. This form of the ritual had caused injury to bystanders and debris grazed Pope Paul VI, so for the Great Jubilee of 2000, Pope John Paul II simplified the rite considerably by opening and closing the unsealed holy doors with his hands.

Traditionally, the pope himself opens and closes the holy doors of Saint Peter's Basilica personally, while designating a cardinal to open those of Saint John Lateran (the pope’s actual cathedral), Saint Mary Major and Saint Paul Outside the Walls. For the Great Jubilee, Pope John Paul II chose to open all four doors himself, while still designating cardinals to close all the holy doors the following year except that of Saint Peter's.

Catholic parishes all over the world perform similar rites of dedicating an existing door for the jubilee year. This allows parishioners not present in Rome for the occasion to obtain the same indulgences attached to the holy doors of the four major basilicas.

== Jubilee "in Perpetuum" ==
The Jubilee in perpetuum refers to the possibility, granted by the Holy See, for periodic and continuous celebration of a Jubilee Year in specific locations recognized as centers of spiritual renewal and of particular importance to the Catholic faith.

This privilege has been granted to nine places that can celebrate their Jubilee in perpetuity: Jerusalem, Rome, Santiago de Compostela, the Monastery of Santo Toribio de Liébana, the Royal Monastery of Santa María de Guadalupe, Caravaca de la Cruz, Urda, Valencia, and Ávila.

== Miscellaneous jubilee events ==
In August 2020, Pope Francis approved the extension of the Jubilee Year of Loreto to 2021. The jubilee year marks the 100th anniversary of the official proclamation of Our Lady of Loreto as the patroness of pilots and air passengers. It began 8 December 2019 and was due to end 10 December 2020, the feast of Our Lady of Loreto, but was extended to 10 December 2021 because of disruptions due to the COVID-19 pandemic.

Pope John Paul II named some of his voyages jubilee pilgrimages: to Mount Sinai and the Holy Land in 2000, and a Jubilee Pilgrimage in the Footsteps of Saint Paul in 2001 to Malta, Syria and Greece.

== Jubilee indulgence ==
This is a plenary indulgence which, as stated by Pope Boniface VIII in consistory, it is the intention of the Holy See to grant in the most ample manner possible. When first conceded, such an indulgence, and also the privilege annexed of choosing a confessor who had power to absolve from reserved cases, was a much rarer spiritual boon than it has since become. So preeminent was the favor then regarded that the custom arose of suspending all other indulgences during the jubilee year, a practice which, with certain modifications, still exists to the present day. The precise conditions for gaining each jubilee indulgence are determined by the Roman pontiff, and they are usually announced in a special Bull, distinct from that which it is customary to issue on the preceding feast of the Ascension giving notice of the forthcoming celebration. The main conditions, however, which do not usually vary, are five: confession, Communion, prayer for the Pope, complete renunciation of all attachment to sin, and visits to the four basilicas during a certain specified period. (The first four are common to all plenary indulgences.) The statement made by some, that the jubilee indulgence, being a culpa et a paena, did not of old presuppose either confession or repentance, is absolutely without foundation, and is contradicted by every extant official document of the Roman Catholic Church. Besides the ordinary jubilee indulgence, to be gained only by pilgrims who pay a visit to Rome, or through special concession by certain cloistered religious confined within their monasteries, it has long been customary to extend this indulgence the following year to the faithful throughout the world, though in 2000, the indulgence was extended to the whole world during the jubilee year itself. For this, fresh conditions are appointed, usually including a certain number of visits to local churches and sometimes fasting or other works of charity. Further, the popes have constantly exercised their prerogative of conceding to all the faithful indulgences ad instar jubilaei (after the model of a jubilee) which are commonly known as "extraordinary jubilees". On these occasions, as at the jubilee itself, special facilities are usually accorded for absolution from reserved cases, though on the other hand, the great indulgence is only to be gained by the performance of conditions much more onerous than those required for an ordinary plenary indulgence. Such extraordinary jubilees are commonly granted by a newly elected pontiff at his accession or on occasions of some unexpected celebration, as was done, for example, at the convening of the First Vatican Council, or again at times of great calamity.

Pope John Paul II convoked jubilees in 1983 (Holy Year of the Redemption) and in 2000 (the Great Jubilee). In 2000, he greatly liberalized the conditions for gaining the jubilee indulgence. A visit to only one of the four patriarchal basilicas in Rome was necessary (entering through the holy door). To the four basilicas were added the Sanctuary of Divine Love in Rome, and each diocese was permitted to name a location within the diocese where the indulgence could be gained. For instance, the Diocese of Rome added the chapel in the airport at Fiumicino as a possible pilgrimage site. Most dioceses simply named the local cathedral as the pilgrimage site. Multiple visits were not required. On the last full day of the jubilee, pilgrims were permitted to enter the holy door at St. Peter's until late into the night, so that no one would be denied the opportunity to gain the indulgence. The requirements of confession, communion, prayer for the pope, and freedom from all attachment to sin remained in place, as for all plenary indulgences.

== List of Roman Catholic jubilee years ==
Year	Type	Start Date	End Date	Duration	Papal Bull of proclamation	Pope During the Jubilee
1300	Ordinary	22 February 1300	24 December 1300	307 days	Antiquorum habet By Pope Boniface VIII	Pope Boniface VIII
1350	Ordinary	24 December 1349	24 December 1350	366 days	Unigenitus Dei Filius By Pope Clement VI	Pope Clement VI
1390	Ordinary	24 December 1389	24 December 1390	366 days	Salvator noster Unigenitus By Pope Urban VI	Pope Boniface IX
1423	Ordinary	22 December 1422	24 December 1424	368 days	No Papal Bull survived or were published for this specific Holy Year	Pope Martin V
1450	Ordinary	24 December 1449	24 December 1450	366 days	Immensa et Innumerabilia By Pope Nicholas V	Pope Nicholas V
1475	Ordinary	24 December 1474	24 December 1475	366 days	Ineffabilis Providentia By Pope Paul II	Pope Sixtus IV
1500	Ordinary	24 December 1499	24 December 1500	367 days	Pastores Aeterni Qui By Pope Alexander VI	Pope Alexander VI
1525	Ordinary	24 December 1524	24 December 1525	366 days	Inter Sollucitudines By Pope Clement VII	Pope Clement VII
1550	Ordinary	24 February 1550	6 January 1551	317 days	Dominus ac Redemptor By Pope Paul III	Pope Julius III
1575	Ordinary	24 December 1574	24 December 1575	366 days	Dominus ac Redemptor By Pope Gregory XIII	Pope Gregory XIII
1600	Ordinary	24 December 1599	24 December 1600	367 days	Annus Domini Placabilis By Pope Clement VIII	Pope Clement VIII
1625	Ordinary	24 December 1624	24 December 1625	366 days	Pontificia sollicitudo By Pope Urban VIII	Pope Urban VIII
1650	Ordinary	24 December 1649	24 December 1650	366 days	Appropinquat Dilectissimi Filii By Pope Innocent X	Pope Innocent X
1675	Ordinary	24 December 1674	24 December 1675	366 days	Ad Apostolicae Vocis Oraculum By Pope Clement X	Pope Clement X
1700	Ordinary	24 December 1699	24 December 1700	366 days	Regi Saeculorum By Pope Innocent XII	Pope Innocent XII Pope Clement XI
1725	Ordinary	24 December 1724	24 December 1725	366 days	Redemptor et Dominus Noster By Pope Benedict XIII	Pope Benedict XIII
1750	Ordinary	24 December 1749	24 December 1750	366 days	Peregrinantes a Domino By Pope Benedict XIV	Pope Benedict XIV
1775	Ordinary	26 February 1775	31 December 1775	309 days	Salutis Nostrae Auctor By Pope Clement XIV	Pope Pius VI
1825	Ordinary	24 December 1824	24 December 1825	366 days	Quod Hoc Ineunte By Pope Leo XII	Pope Leo XII
1826	Extended	25 December 1825	25 June 1826	183 days	Charitate Christi By Pope Leo XII	Pope Leo XII
1875	Ordinary	1 January 1875	31 December 1875	365 days	Gravibus Ecclesiae By Pope Pius IX	Pope Pius IX
1900	Ordinary	24 December 1899	6 January 1901	379 days	Properante ad Exitum Saeculo By Pope Leo XIII	Pope Leo XIII
1925	Ordinary	24 December 1924	6 January 1926	379 days	Infinita Dei Misericordia By Pope Pius XI	Pope Pius XI
1933	Extraordinary	3 April 1933	2 April 1934	365 days	Quod Nuper By Pope Pius XI	Pope Pius XI
1950	Ordinary	24 December 1949	6 January, 1951	379 days	Jubilaeum Maximum By Pope Pius XII	Pope Pius XII
1975	Ordinary	24 December 1974	6 January, 1976	379 days	Apostolorum Limina By Pope Paul VI	Pope Paul VI
1983	Extraordinary	25 March 1983	22 April 1984	395 days	Aperite Portas Redemptori By Pope John Paul II	Pope John Paul II
2000	Ordinary	24 December 1999	6 January, 2001	380 days	Incarnationis Mysterium By Pope John Paul II	Pope John Paul II
2016	Extraordinary	8 December 2015	20 November 2016	349 days	Misericordiae vultus By Pope Francis	Pope Francis
2025	Ordinary	24 December 2024	6 January 2026	379 days	Spes non confundit By Pope Francis	Pope Francis Pope Leo XIV

=== Jubilees with no opening or closing of the Holy Door ===
1. 1585: Sixtus V
2. 1655: Alexander VII
3. 1745: Benedict XIV
4. 1829: Pius VIII
5. 1886: Leo XIII
6. 1965: Paul VI
7. 2026: Leo XIV

== List of future Roman Catholic jubilee years ==
Year	Type	Start Date	End Date	Duration
2033	Extraordinary	TBA by the Holy See	TBA by the Holy See	??? days
2050	Ordinary	24 December 2049**	6 January 2051**	379 days
2075	Ordinary	24 December 2074**	6 January 2076**	379 days
2100	Ordinary	24 December 2099**	6 January 2101**	379 days

**Prediction based on the norm of past ordinary jubilee years, may be changed by the Holy See.

== See also ==
- Holy Door
- Marian year
- Jubilee (disambiguation page)
- Christian views on the Old Covenant
