= Common year starting on Saturday =

A common year starting on Saturday is any non-leap year (i.e. a year with 365 days) that begins on Saturday, 1 January, and ends on Saturday, 31 December. Its dominical letter hence is B. The most recent year of such kind was 2022, and the next one will be 2033 in the Gregorian calendar or, likewise, 2023 and 2034 in the obsolete Julian calendar. See below for more.

Any common year that starts on Saturday has only one Friday the 13th: the only one in this common year occurs in May. Leap years starting on Friday share this characteristic.

== Calendars ==
Calendar for any common year starting on Saturday,
presented as common in many English-speaking areas

	January
Su	Mo	Tu	We	Th	Fr	Sa
						1
2	3	4	5	6	7	8
9	10	11	12	13	14	15
16	17	18	19	20	21	22
23	24	25	26	27	28	29
30	31

	February
Su	Mo	Tu	We	Th	Fr	Sa
		1	2	3	4	5
6	7	8	9	10	11	12
13	14	15	16	17	18	19
20	21	22	23	24	25	26
27	28

	March
Su	Mo	Tu	We	Th	Fr	Sa
		1	2	3	4	5
6	7	8	9	10	11	12
13	14	15	16	17	18	19
20	21	22	23	24	25	26
27	28	29	30	31

	April
Su	Mo	Tu	We	Th	Fr	Sa
					1	2
3	4	5	6	7	8	9
10	11	12	13	14	15	16
17	18	19	20	21	22	23
24	25	26	27	28	29	30

	May
Su	Mo	Tu	We	Th	Fr	Sa
1	2	3	4	5	6	7
8	9	10	11	12	13	14
15	16	17	18	19	20	21
22	23	24	25	26	27	28
29	30	31

	June
Su	Mo	Tu	We	Th	Fr	Sa
			1	2	3	4
5	6	7	8	9	10	11
12	13	14	15	16	17	18
19	20	21	22	23	24	25
26	27	28	29	30

	July
Su	Mo	Tu	We	Th	Fr	Sa
					1	2
3	4	5	6	7	8	9
10	11	12	13	14	15	16
17	18	19	20	21	22	23
24	25	26	27	28	29	30
31

	August
Su	Mo	Tu	We	Th	Fr	Sa
	1	2	3	4	5	6
7	8	9	10	11	12	13
14	15	16	17	18	19	20
21	22	23	24	25	26	27
28	29	30	31

	September
Su	Mo	Tu	We	Th	Fr	Sa
				1	2	3
4	5	6	7	8	9	10
11	12	13	14	15	16	17
18	19	20	21	22	23	24
25	26	27	28	29	30

	October
Su	Mo	Tu	We	Th	Fr	Sa
						1
2	3	4	5	6	7	8
9	10	11	12	13	14	15
16	17	18	19	20	21	22
23	24	25	26	27	28	29
30	31

	November
Su	Mo	Tu	We	Th	Fr	Sa
		1	2	3	4	5
6	7	8	9	10	11	12
13	14	15	16	17	18	19
20	21	22	23	24	25	26
27	28	29	30

	December
Su	Mo	Tu	We	Th	Fr	Sa
				1	2	3
4	5	6	7	8	9	10
11	12	13	14	15	16	17
18	19	20	21	22	23	24
25	26	27	28	29	30	31

ISO 8601-conformant calendar with week numbers for
any common year starting on Saturday (dominical letter B) preceded by a common year starting on Friday (dominical letter C)

	January
Wk	Mo	Tu	We	Th	Fr	Sa	Su
52						01	02
01	03	04	05	06	07	08	09
02	10	11	12	13	14	15	16
03	17	18	19	20	21	22	23
04	24	25	26	27	28	29	30
05	31

	February
Wk	Mo	Tu	We	Th	Fr	Sa	Su
05		01	02	03	04	05	06
06	07	08	09	10	11	12	13
07	14	15	16	17	18	19	20
08	21	22	23	24	25	26	27
09	28

	March
Wk	Mo	Tu	We	Th	Fr	Sa	Su
09		01	02	03	04	05	06
10	07	08	09	10	11	12	13
11	14	15	16	17	18	19	20
12	21	22	23	24	25	26	27
13	28	29	30	31

	April
Wk	Mo	Tu	We	Th	Fr	Sa	Su
13					01	02	03
14	04	05	06	07	08	09	10
15	11	12	13	14	15	16	17
16	18	19	20	21	22	23	24
17	25	26	27	28	29	30

	May
Wk	Mo	Tu	We	Th	Fr	Sa	Su
17							01
18	02	03	04	05	06	07	08
19	09	10	11	12	13	14	15
20	16	17	18	19	20	21	22
21	23	24	25	26	27	28	29
22	30	31

	June
Wk	Mo	Tu	We	Th	Fr	Sa	Su
22			01	02	03	04	05
23	06	07	08	09	10	11	12
24	13	14	15	16	17	18	19
25	20	21	22	23	24	25	26
26	27	28	29	30

	July
Wk	Mo	Tu	We	Th	Fr	Sa	Su
26					01	02	03
27	04	05	06	07	08	09	10
28	11	12	13	14	15	16	17
29	18	19	20	21	22	23	24
30	25	26	27	28	29	30	31

	August
Wk	Mo	Tu	We	Th	Fr	Sa	Su
31	01	02	03	04	05	06	07
32	08	09	10	11	12	13	14
33	15	16	17	18	19	20	21
34	22	23	24	25	26	27	28
35	29	30	31

	September
Wk	Mo	Tu	We	Th	Fr	Sa	Su
35				01	02	03	04
36	05	06	07	08	09	10	11
37	12	13	14	15	16	17	18
38	19	20	21	22	23	24	25
39	26	27	28	29	30

	October
Wk	Mo	Tu	We	Th	Fr	Sa	Su
39						01	02
40	03	04	05	06	07	08	09
41	10	11	12	13	14	15	16
42	17	18	19	20	21	22	23
43	24	25	26	27	28	29	30
44	31

	November
Wk	Mo	Tu	We	Th	Fr	Sa	Su
44		01	02	03	04	05	06
45	07	08	09	10	11	12	13
46	14	15	16	17	18	19	20
47	21	22	23	24	25	26	27
48	28	29	30

	December
Wk	Mo	Tu	We	Th	Fr	Sa	Su
48				01	02	03	04
49	05	06	07	08	09	10	11
50	12	13	14	15	16	17	18
51	19	20	21	22	23	24	25
52	26	27	28	29	30	31

ISO 8601-conformant calendar with week numbers for
any common year starting on Saturday (dominical letter B) preceded by a leap year starting on Thursday (dominical letter DC)

	January
Wk	Mo	Tu	We	Th	Fr	Sa	Su
53						01	02
01	03	04	05	06	07	08	09
02	10	11	12	13	14	15	16
03	17	18	19	20	21	22	23
04	24	25	26	27	28	29	30
05	31

	February
Wk	Mo	Tu	We	Th	Fr	Sa	Su
05		01	02	03	04	05	06
06	07	08	09	10	11	12	13
07	14	15	16	17	18	19	20
08	21	22	23	24	25	26	27
09	28

	March
Wk	Mo	Tu	We	Th	Fr	Sa	Su
09		01	02	03	04	05	06
10	07	08	09	10	11	12	13
11	14	15	16	17	18	19	20
12	21	22	23	24	25	26	27
13	28	29	30	31

	April
Wk	Mo	Tu	We	Th	Fr	Sa	Su
13					01	02	03
14	04	05	06	07	08	09	10
15	11	12	13	14	15	16	17
16	18	19	20	21	22	23	24
17	25	26	27	28	29	30

	May
Wk	Mo	Tu	We	Th	Fr	Sa	Su
17							01
18	02	03	04	05	06	07	08
19	09	10	11	12	13	14	15
20	16	17	18	19	20	21	22
21	23	24	25	26	27	28	29
22	30	31

	June
Wk	Mo	Tu	We	Th	Fr	Sa	Su
22			01	02	03	04	05
23	06	07	08	09	10	11	12
24	13	14	15	16	17	18	19
25	20	21	22	23	24	25	26
26	27	28	29	30

	July
Wk	Mo	Tu	We	Th	Fr	Sa	Su
26					01	02	03
27	04	05	06	07	08	09	10
28	11	12	13	14	15	16	17
29	18	19	20	21	22	23	24
30	25	26	27	28	29	30	31

	August
Wk	Mo	Tu	We	Th	Fr	Sa	Su
31	01	02	03	04	05	06	07
32	08	09	10	11	12	13	14
33	15	16	17	18	19	20	21
34	22	23	24	25	26	27	28
35	29	30	31

	September
Wk	Mo	Tu	We	Th	Fr	Sa	Su
35				01	02	03	04
36	05	06	07	08	09	10	11
37	12	13	14	15	16	17	18
38	19	20	21	22	23	24	25
39	26	27	28	29	30

	October
Wk	Mo	Tu	We	Th	Fr	Sa	Su
39						01	02
40	03	04	05	06	07	08	09
41	10	11	12	13	14	15	16
42	17	18	19	20	21	22	23
43	24	25	26	27	28	29	30
44	31

	November
Wk	Mo	Tu	We	Th	Fr	Sa	Su
44		01	02	03	04	05	06
45	07	08	09	10	11	12	13
46	14	15	16	17	18	19	20
47	21	22	23	24	25	26	27
48	28	29	30

	December
Wk	Mo	Tu	We	Th	Fr	Sa	Su
48				01	02	03	04
49	05	06	07	08	09	10	11
50	12	13	14	15	16	17	18
51	19	20	21	22	23	24	25
52	26	27	28	29	30	31

== Applicable years ==
=== Gregorian Calendar ===
In the (currently used) Gregorian calendar, alongside Sunday, Monday, Wednesday or Friday, the fourteen types of year (seven common, seven leap) repeat in a 400-year cycle (20871 weeks). Forty-three common years per cycle or exactly 10.75% start on a Saturday. The 28-year sub-cycle will break at a century year which is not divisible by 400 (e.g. it broke at the year 1900 but not at the year 2000).

Gregorian common years starting on Saturday
	1st		2nd	3rd		4th		5th	6th		7th		8th	9th		10th
16th century	prior to first adoption (proleptic)													1583		1594
17th century	1605		1611	1622		1633	1639	1650	—		1661	1667	1678	1689		1695
18th century	1701	1707	1718	1729		1735		1746	1757		1763		1774	1785		1791
19th century	1803		1814	1825		1831		1842	1853	1859	-		1870	1881	1887	1898
20th century	—		1910	1921	1927	1938		1949	1955		1966		1977	1983		1994
21st century	2005		2011	2022		2033	2039	2050	—		2061	2067	2078	2089		2095
22nd century	2101	2107	2118	2129		2135		2146	2157		2163		2174	2185		2191
23rd century	2203		2214	2225		2231		2242	2253	2259	-		2270	2281	2287	2298
24th century	—		2310	2321	2327	2338		2349	2355		2366		2377	2383		2394
25th century	2405		2411	2422		2433	2439	2450	—		2461	2467	2478	2489		2495

400-year cycle
0–99	5	11	22	33	39	50	61	67	78	89	95
100–199	101	107	118	129	135	146	157	163	174	185	191
200–299	203	214	225	231	242	253	259	270	281	287	298
300–399	310	321	327	338	349	355	366	377	383	394	

=== Julian Calendar ===
In the now-obsolete Julian calendar, the fourteen types of year (seven common, seven leap) repeat in a 28-year cycle (1461 weeks). A leap year has two adjoining dominical letters, (one for January and February and the other for March to December in the Church of England, as 29 February has no letter). Each of the seven two-letter sequences occurs once within a cycle, and every common letter thrice.

As the Julian calendar repeats after 28 years that means it will also repeat after 700 years, i.e. 25 cycles. The year's position in the cycle is given by the formula (((year + 8) mod 28) + 1). Years 10, 16 and 27 of the cycle are common years beginning on Saturday. 2017 is year 10 of the cycle. Approximately 10.71% of all years are common years starting on Saturday.

Julian common years starting on Saturday
Decade	1st	2nd	3rd	4th		5th	6th		7th	8th		9th	10th	
15th century	1401	1407	1418	1429	1435	1446		1457		1463	1474	1485		1491
16th century	1502	1513	1519	1530	—	1541	1547	1558		1569	1575	1586		1597
17th century	1603	1614	1625	1631		1642	1653	1659		1670	—	1681	1687	1698
18th century	1709	1715	1726	1737		1743	1754		1765	1771		1782	1793	1799
19th century	1810	—	1821	1827	1838	1849		1855	1866	1877		1883	1894	
20th century	1905	1911	1922	1933	1939	1950	—		1961	1967	1978	1989		1995
21st century	2006	2017	2023	2034		2045	2051		2062	2073	2079	2090	—	

== Holidays ==
=== International ===
- Valentine's Day and Halloween falls on a Monday
- World Day for Grandparents and the Elderly falls on July 24
- Christmas Day falls on a Sunday

=== Roman Catholic Solemnities ===
- Epiphany falls on a Thursday
- Candlemas falls on a Wednesday
- Saint Joseph's Day falls on a Saturday
- The Annunciation of Jesus falls on a Friday
- The Nativity of John the Baptist falls on a Friday
- The Solemnity of Saints Peter and Paul falls on a Wednesday
- The Transfiguration of Jesus falls on a Saturday
- The Assumption of Mary falls on a Monday
- The Exaltation of the Holy Cross falls on a Wednesday
- All Saints' Day falls on a Tuesday
- All Souls' Day falls on a Wednesday
- The Feast of Christ the King falls on its earliest possible date, November 20 (or on October 30 in versions of the calendar between 1925 and 1962)
- The First Sunday of Advent falls on its earliest possible date, November 27
- The Immaculate Conception falls on a Thursday
- Gaudete Sunday falls on its earliest possible date, December 11
- Rorate Sunday falls on its earliest possible date, December 18

=== Australia and New Zealand ===
- Australia Day falls on a Wednesday
- Waitangi Day falls on a Sunday
- Daylight saving ends on April 3
- ANZAC Day falls on a Monday
- Mother's Day falls on its earliest possible date, May 8
- Father's Day falls on September 4
- Daylight saving begins on September 25 in New Zealand and October 2 in Australia

=== British Isles ===
- Saint David's Day falls on a Tuesday
- Mother's Day falls on March 6, March 13, March 20, March 27 or April 3
- Daylight saving begins on March 27
- Saint Patrick's Day falls on a Thursday
- Saint George's Day falls on a Saturday
- Father's Day falls on June 19
- Orangeman's Day falls on a Tuesday
- Daylight saving ends on October 30
- Guy Fawkes Night falls on a Saturday
- Saint Andrew's Day falls on a Wednesday

=== Canada ===
- Daylight saving begins on March 13
- Mother's Day falls on its earliest possible date, May 8
- Victoria Day falls on May 23
- Father's Day falls on June 19
- Canada Day falls on a Friday
- Labour Day falls on September 5
- Thanksgiving Day falls on October 10
- Daylight saving ends on November 6

=== Denmark ===
- The Constitution Day falls on a Sunday

=== Germany ===
- The reunification falls on a Monday

=== United States ===
- Martin Luther King Jr. Day falls on January 17
- Presidents' Day falls on its latest possible date, February 21
- Daylight saving begins on March 13
- Mother's Day falls on its earliest possible date, May 8. This is the only type of year when Presidents’ Day to Mother’s Day are only 76 days apart. They are 83 days apart in all other years
- Memorial Day falls on May 30
- Juneteenth and Father's Day coincide on Sunday, June 19
- Independence Day falls on a Monday
- Labor Day falls on September 5
- Grandparents' Day falls on September 11
- Columbus Day falls on October 10
- Daylight saving ends on November 6
- Election Day falls on its latest possible date, November 8. This is the only type of common year when Mother’s Day to Election Day are 184 days apart. They are 177 days apart in all other common years.
- Thanksgiving Day falls on November 24
