= Extraordinary Jubilee of St. Francis =

Holy Year in the Catholic Church

- Native name: Annus Sanctus Franciscianus
- Date: 10 January 2026 – 10 January 2027
- Duration: 366 days
- Location: Worldwide
- Type: Jubilee
- Theme: Humility, Poverty, Peace
- Organised by: Various dioceses

The Extraordinary Jubilee of St. Francis (Latin: Annus Sanctus Franciscianus) is a Catholic period of prayer held from 10 January 2026 to 10 January 2027, to commemorating the 800th anniversary of the Transitus of St. Francis of Assisi. The 2026 Jubilee is announced by Pope Leo XIV on 10 January 2026. It is the 29th holy year in history, following the ordinary 2025 Jubilee which concluded only four days earlier.

== Main events ==
The following main events and days of celebration for specific categories of the faithful are scheduled:

- 10 January 2026:
