= 2033 Extraordinary Jubilee of the Redemption =

Major event in the Catholic Church commemorating the year 2033

- Native name: Iubilaeum Redemptionis A.D. MMXXXIII
- Date: 2033
- Duration: To be Announced by the Holy See
- Location: Worldwide

The 2033 Extraordinary Jubilee of the Redemption is an extraordinary Jubilee Year in the Catholic Church that will be celebrated in the year 2033. Announced by Pope Leo XIV at the end of the 2025 Jubilee Year, it will commemorate the 2,000th anniversary of the Passion, death, and resurrection of Jesus.

The official start and end of the 2033 Jubilee Year will be announced by a papal bull proclaiming the Jubilee Year, most likely sometime in 2032.

== Liturgical dates ==
- Palm Sunday: April 10, 2033
- Holy Thursday: April 14, 2033
- Good Friday: April 15, 2033
- Holy Saturday: April 16, 2033
- Easter Sunday: April 17, 2033
- Ascension Thursday: May 26, 2033
- Pentecost Sunday: June 5, 2033

== History ==
The Catholic Church has twice previously marked this anniversary with a jubilee year, both announced on the feast of the Epiphany.

- 1933 Extraordinary Jubilee of the Redemption — Pope Pius XI proclaimed an extraordinary jubilee with the bull Quod Nuper, marking the 1,900th anniversary of the Redemption. More than two million pilgrims came to Rome.
- 1983 Extraordinary Jubilee of the Redemption — Pope John Paul II proclaimed an extraordinary jubilee with the bull Aperite Portas Redemptori, marking the 1,950th anniversary of the Redemption.

The 2033 jubilee completes the series, marking the 2,000th anniversary year.

== Preparation ==
On November 29, 2025, while in Istanbul for the 1,700th anniversary of the First Council of Nicaea, Pope Leo XIV called Christians to journey together toward this anniversary. He expressed the hope that it be marked in Jerusalem, in the Upper Room, and he addressed the invitation not only to Catholics but to all Christians — making the road to 2033 a path of unity as well as of penance and thanksgiving.

On the Epiphany, January 6, 2026, the Holy Father signaled again that the next Holy Door to open will be for this Extraordinary Jubilee in 2033.

=== Global 2033 ===
Global 2033 is primarily a consortium of organizations and movements, dioceses and entities in the Catholic Church with one objective: to bring the Gospel to all mankind, to fulfil the Great Commission 2,000 years after Jesus said to go and make disciples in all nations.

=== Journey to Redemption 2033 ===
The delegation Journey to Redemption 2033 (J2R2033) is responsible for promoting the global project "Rome 25 – Santiago 27 – Jerusalem 33," an initiative that originated within the Spanish Episcopal Conference and is supported by numerous dioceses, ecclesial movements and European Episcopal Conferences. The program forms part of a progressive journey of preparation that will accompany the Church toward the Extraordinary Jubilee of 2033.

== Events ==
=== Holy Doors ===
Opening and closing of the Holy Doors of the four major papal basilicas in Rome, normally sealed with mortar and cement, signal the beginning and end of the jubilee:

Basilica	Opening date	Closing date	Image
St. Peter's Basilica in the Vatican	(To be Announced)	(To be Announced)	
St. John Lateran Basilica	(To be Announced)	(To be Announced)	
Basilica of Saint Mary Major	(To be Announced)	(To be Announced)	
Basilica of Saint Paul Outside the Walls	(To be Announced)	(To be Announced)	
