= Ferdinando Marinelli Artistic Foundry =

Florentine artistic foundry

Coordinates: 43°29′03.6″N 11°08′06.0″E

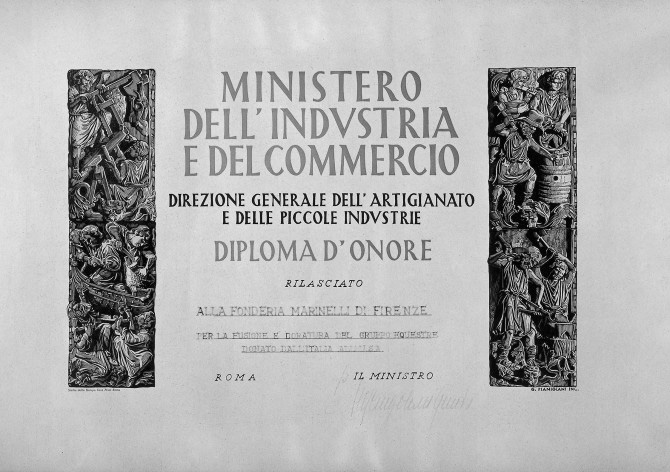
- Diploma of Honor awarded to the Marinelli Foundry in Florence for the casting and gilding of the equestrian statue 'Sacrifice', donated by Italy to the United States
- Native name: Fonderia Artistica Ferdinando Marinelli (FAFM)
- Industry: Metalworking
- Founded: Florence, Tuscany, Italy, 1905
- Key people: Ferdinando Marinelli, founder; Ferdinando Marinelli Jr., owner
- Products: Statues and Monuments in Bronze
- Website: www.fonderiamarinelli.it

The Ferdinando Marinelli Artistic Foundry (Fonderia Artistica Ferdinando Marinelli, abbreviated as FAFM) is an Italian bronze casting workshop that produces original sculptures and recreations using the Renaissance-era technique of lost-wax casting. It was established in Florence in 1905.

Works associated with the foundry include the 1998 La Fontana del Porcellino in Florence's Loggia del Mercato Nuovo, the Arlington Memorial Bridge approach statue Sacrifice and a sculpture of the United Nations' Celestial Sphere Woodrow Wilson Memorial.

== History ==
Ferdinando Marinelli moved to Florence as a teenager and apprenticed under artisans such as Cusmano Vignali and Gabellini. He learned both stirrup manufacturing and the lost-wax casting technique. In 1905, he established a small workshop on Via de' Giudei (now Via Ramaglianti) in Florence.

In 1915, Marinelli joined Alessandro Biagiotti's foundry. After World War I, he purchased the late Gabellini's foundry on Via del Romito (now Via Filippo Corridoni). During this era, the foundry created monuments in Piazza Dalmatia, Florence, Poggio a Caiano, Barberino Val d'Elsa, and Cerbaia, commemorating World War I and collaborated with artists like Mario Moschi and Odo Franceschi.

In 1925, the foundry erected a monument dedicated to the painter Giovanni Fattori. In 1927, the Florence Chamber of Commerce listed the foundry among local artistic industries. Independent sources describe its use of traditional bronze casting methods.

== Notable castings ==
Year	Artist	Title	Location	Country	Photo
1925	Valmore Gemignani	Giovanni Fattori	Livorno	Italy	
1927	Mario Moschi	Monument to the Fallen; Monumento ai caduti	Piazza Dalmazia, Florence	Italy	
1929	José Belloni	The Pioneer's Cart; La Carretta dei Pionieri	Parque Batlle, Montevideo	Uruguay	
1930	Guglielmo Colasanti	Madonna degli Angeli	Basilica of Santa Maria degli Angeli, Assisi	Italy	
1930	José Belloni	William Tell; Gugliemo Tell	Parque Rodó, Montevideo	Uruguay	
1932	Antonio Maraini	Bramante Staircase, Vatican Museums	Vatican City	Vatican City	
1932	Posthumously of Michelangelo	Pietà, Museo Soumaya	Mexico City	Mexico	
1939		Tomb of Pope Pius XI	Vatican City	Vatican City	
1944	Vico Consorti	Door of Thanksgiving; Porta della Riconoscenza	Siena Cathedral	Italy	
1949	Leo Friedlander	Sacrifice	Arlington Memorial Bridge, Washington, DC	United States	
1950	Vico Consorti	Porta Santa; Holy Door	St. Peter's Basilica, Vatican City	Vatican City	
1953	Giovanni Cappelletti	Christopher Columbus	Newport, Rhode Island	United States	
1960	Valteroni	Door, Cathedral of Oropa; Porta della Cattedrale di Oropa	Sanctuary of Oropa	Italy	
1969	Mario Moschi	Sacred Heart Door; Porta del Sacro Cuore	Basilica del Sacro Cuore, Sassari	Italy	
1972	Bruno Burracchini	Catherine of Siena	Fortezza Medicea, Siena	Italy	
1984	Sergio Benvenuti	Fountain of the Two Oceans; Fontana dei due oceani	San Diego, California	United States	
1989	Robert Dean	Monument to Dwight Eisenhower; Monumento a Eisenhower	Grosvenor Square, London	United Kingdom	
1998	Posthumously of Pietro Tacca	Porcellino; Fontana del Porcellino	Loggia del Mercato Nuovo, Florence	Italy	
1998		Restoration of Kremlin Halls	Grand Kremlin Palace, Moscow	Russia	
1999		Handrail, Vatican Museums; Corrimano della Nuova Rampa dei Musei Vaticani	Vatican City	Vatican City	
2001	Sergio Benvenuti	Broncos' Fountain	Sports Authority Field at Mile High, Denver	United States	
2006	Posthumously of Giambologna	Bacchus; Bacco	Borgo San Jacopo, Florence	Italy	
2007	Posthumously of Ghiberti	St. Matthew; San Matteo	Orsanmichele Church, Florence	Italy	
2008	Posthumously	The Etruscan Minerva; Minerva Etrusca	National Archaeological Museum (Florence)	Italy	
2008	Valentina Stevanovska	Warrior on Horseback	Macedonia Square, Skopje	North Macedonia	
2008	Posthumously of Donatello	David (with gold plating)	Bargello, Florence	Italy	
2010	Posthumously	Chimera of Arezzo	National Archaeological Museum (Florence)	Italy	
2013	Arto Tchakmaktchian	Espoir	Laval, Quebec, Montreal	Canada	
2018 (restoration)	Paul Manship	Celestial Sphere Woodrow Wilson Memorial	Palace of Nations, United Nations Office at Geneva, Canton of Geneva	Switzerland	

== See also ==
- Conservation and restoration of cultural property
- Pietro Bazzanti e Figlio Art Gallery
