= 2033 =

2033 in various calendars
- Gregorian calendar: 2033; MMXXXIII
- Ab urbe condita: 2786
- Armenian calendar: 1482; ԹՎ ՌՆՁԲ
- Assyrian calendar: 6783
- Baháʼí calendar: 189–190
- Balinese saka calendar: 1954–1955
- Bengali calendar: 1439–1440
- Berber calendar: 2983
- British Regnal year: N/A
- Buddhist calendar: 2577
- Burmese calendar: 1395
- Byzantine calendar: 7541–7542
- Chinese calendar: 壬子年 (Water Rat); 4730 or 4523 — to — 癸丑年 (Water Ox); 4731 or 4524
- Coptic calendar: 1749–1750
- Discordian calendar: 3199
- Ethiopian calendar: 2025–2026
- Hebrew calendar: 5793–5794
- Hindu calendars
- Vikram Samvat: 2089–2090
- Shaka Samvat: 1954–1955
- Kali Yuga: 5133–5134
- Holocene calendar: 12033
- Igbo calendar: 1033–1034
- Iranian calendar: 1411–1412
- Islamic calendar: 1454–1455
- Japanese calendar: Reiwa 15 (令和１５年)
- Javanese calendar: 1966–1967
- Juche calendar: 122
- Julian calendar: Gregorian minus 13 days
- Korean calendar: 4366
- Minguo calendar: ROC 122 民國122年
- Nanakshahi calendar: 565
- Thai solar calendar: 2576
- Tibetan calendar: ཆུ་ཕོ་བྱི་བ་ལོ་ (male Water-Rat); 2159 or 1778 or 1006 — to — ཆུ་མོ་གླང་ལོ་ (female Water-Ox); 2160 or 1779 or 1007
- Unix time: 1988150400 – 2019686399

2033 (MMXXXIII) will be a common year starting on Saturday of the Gregorian calendar, the 2033rd year of the Common Era (CE) and Anno Domini (AD) designations, the 33rd year of the 3rd millennium and the 21st century, and the 4th year of the 2030s decade.

== Predicted and scheduled events ==
=== Date unknown ===
- The final phase of Britain's HS2 rail link will be complete.
- NASA hopes to send humans to Mars by this year.
- The 2033 Women's Rugby World Cup will be held in the United States.
- The 2033 Extraordinary Jubilee of the Redemption will be an Extraordinary Jubilee in the Catholic Church that will commemorate the 2,000th anniversary of the Passion, death, and resurrection of Jesus in 2033, as announced by Pope Leo XIV at the end of the 2025 Jubilee Year.
