= Common year starting on Sunday =

A common year starting on Sunday is any non-leap year (i.e. a year with 365 days) that begins on Sunday, 1 January, and ends on Sunday, 31 December. Its dominical letter hence is A. The most recent year of such kind was 2023, and the next one will be 2034 in the Gregorian calendar, or, likewise, 2018 and 2029 in the obsolete Julian calendar, see below for more.

Any common year that starts on a Sunday has two Friday the 13ths: those two in this common year occur in January and October.

== Calendars ==
Calendar for any common year starting on Sunday,
presented as common in many English-speaking areas

| | January |
| Su | Mo | Tu | We | Th | Fr | Sa |
| 1 | 2 | 3 | 4 | 5 | 6 | 7 |
| 8 | 9 | 10 | 11 | 12 | 13 | 14 |
| 15 | 16 | 17 | 18 | 19 | 20 | 21 |
| 22 | 23 | 24 | 25 | 26 | 27 | 28 |
| 29 | 30 | 31 |

| | February |
| Su | Mo | Tu | We | Th | Fr | Sa |
| | | | 1 | 2 | 3 | 4 |
| 5 | 6 | 7 | 8 | 9 | 10 | 11 |
| 12 | 13 | 14 | 15 | 16 | 17 | 18 |
| 19 | 20 | 21 | 22 | 23 | 24 | 25 |
| 26 | 27 | 28 |

| | March |
| Su | Mo | Tu | We | Th | Fr | Sa |
| | | | 1 | 2 | 3 | 4 |
| 5 | 6 | 7 | 8 | 9 | 10 | 11 |
| 12 | 13 | 14 | 15 | 16 | 17 | 18 |
| 19 | 20 | 21 | 22 | 23 | 24 | 25 |
| 26 | 27 | 28 | 29 | 30 | 31 |

| | April |
| Su | Mo | Tu | We | Th | Fr | Sa |
| | | | | | | 1 |
| 2 | 3 | 4 | 5 | 6 | 7 | 8 |
| 9 | 10 | 11 | 12 | 13 | 14 | 15 |
| 16 | 17 | 18 | 19 | 20 | 21 | 22 |
| 23 | 24 | 25 | 26 | 27 | 28 | 29 |
| 30 |

| | May |
| Su | Mo | Tu | We | Th | Fr | Sa |
| | 1 | 2 | 3 | 4 | 5 | 6 |
| 7 | 8 | 9 | 10 | 11 | 12 | 13 |
| 14 | 15 | 16 | 17 | 18 | 19 | 20 |
| 21 | 22 | 23 | 24 | 25 | 26 | 27 |
| 28 | 29 | 30 | 31 |

| | June |
| Su | Mo | Tu | We | Th | Fr | Sa |
| | | | | 1 | 2 | 3 |
| 4 | 5 | 6 | 7 | 8 | 9 | 10 |
| 11 | 12 | 13 | 14 | 15 | 16 | 17 |
| 18 | 19 | 20 | 21 | 22 | 23 | 24 |
| 25 | 26 | 27 | 28 | 29 | 30 |

| | July |
| Su | Mo | Tu | We | Th | Fr | Sa |
| | | | | | | 1 |
| 2 | 3 | 4 | 5 | 6 | 7 | 8 |
| 9 | 10 | 11 | 12 | 13 | 14 | 15 |
| 16 | 17 | 18 | 19 | 20 | 21 | 22 |
| 23 | 24 | 25 | 26 | 27 | 28 | 29 |
| 30 | 31 |

| | August |
| Su | Mo | Tu | We | Th | Fr | Sa |
| | | 1 | 2 | 3 | 4 | 5 |
| 6 | 7 | 8 | 9 | 10 | 11 | 12 |
| 13 | 14 | 15 | 16 | 17 | 18 | 19 |
| 20 | 21 | 22 | 23 | 24 | 25 | 26 |
| 27 | 28 | 29 | 30 | 31 |

| | September |
| Su | Mo | Tu | We | Th | Fr | Sa |
| | | | | | 1 | 2 |
| 3 | 4 | 5 | 6 | 7 | 8 | 9 |
| 10 | 11 | 12 | 13 | 14 | 15 | 16 |
| 17 | 18 | 19 | 20 | 21 | 22 | 23 |
| 24 | 25 | 26 | 27 | 28 | 29 | 30 |

| | October |
| Su | Mo | Tu | We | Th | Fr | Sa |
| 1 | 2 | 3 | 4 | 5 | 6 | 7 |
| 8 | 9 | 10 | 11 | 12 | 13 | 14 |
| 15 | 16 | 17 | 18 | 19 | 20 | 21 |
| 22 | 23 | 24 | 25 | 26 | 27 | 28 |
| 29 | 30 | 31 |

| | November |
| Su | Mo | Tu | We | Th | Fr | Sa |
| | | | 1 | 2 | 3 | 4 |
| 5 | 6 | 7 | 8 | 9 | 10 | 11 |
| 12 | 13 | 14 | 15 | 16 | 17 | 18 |
| 19 | 20 | 21 | 22 | 23 | 24 | 25 |
| 26 | 27 | 28 | 29 | 30 |

| | December |
| Su | Mo | Tu | We | Th | Fr | Sa |
| | | | | | 1 | 2 |
| 3 | 4 | 5 | 6 | 7 | 8 | 9 |
| 10 | 11 | 12 | 13 | 14 | 15 | 16 |
| 17 | 18 | 19 | 20 | 21 | 22 | 23 |
| 24 | 25 | 26 | 27 | 28 | 29 | 30 |
| 31 |

ISO 8601-conformant calendar with week numbers for
any common year starting on Sunday (dominical letter A)

| | January |
| Wk | Mo | Tu | We | Th | Fr | Sa | Su |
| 52 | | | | | | | 01 |
| 01 | 02 | 03 | 04 | 05 | 06 | 07 | 08 |
| 02 | 09 | 10 | 11 | 12 | 13 | 14 | 15 |
| 03 | 16 | 17 | 18 | 19 | 20 | 21 | 22 |
| 04 | 23 | 24 | 25 | 26 | 27 | 28 | 29 |
| 05 | 30 | 31 |

| | February |
| Wk | Mo | Tu | We | Th | Fr | Sa | Su |
| 05 | | | 01 | 02 | 03 | 04 | 05 |
| 06 | 06 | 07 | 08 | 09 | 10 | 11 | 12 |
| 07 | 13 | 14 | 15 | 16 | 17 | 18 | 19 |
| 08 | 20 | 21 | 22 | 23 | 24 | 25 | 26 |
| 09 | 27 | 28 |

| | March |
| Wk | Mo | Tu | We | Th | Fr | Sa | Su |
| 09 | | | 01 | 02 | 03 | 04 | 05 |
| 10 | 06 | 07 | 08 | 09 | 10 | 11 | 12 |
| 11 | 13 | 14 | 15 | 16 | 17 | 18 | 19 |
| 12 | 20 | 21 | 22 | 23 | 24 | 25 | 26 |
| 13 | 27 | 28 | 29 | 30 | 31 |

| | April |
| Wk | Mo | Tu | We | Th | Fr | Sa | Su |
| 13 | | | | | | 01 | 02 |
| 14 | 03 | 04 | 05 | 06 | 07 | 08 | 09 |
| 15 | 10 | 11 | 12 | 13 | 14 | 15 | 16 |
| 16 | 17 | 18 | 19 | 20 | 21 | 22 | 23 |
| 17 | 24 | 25 | 26 | 27 | 28 | 29 | 30 |

| | May |
| Wk | Mo | Tu | We | Th | Fr | Sa | Su |
| 18 | 01 | 02 | 03 | 04 | 05 | 06 | 07 |
| 19 | 08 | 09 | 10 | 11 | 12 | 13 | 14 |
| 20 | 15 | 16 | 17 | 18 | 19 | 20 | 21 |
| 21 | 22 | 23 | 24 | 25 | 26 | 27 | 28 |
| 22 | 29 | 30 | 31 |

| | June |
| Wk | Mo | Tu | We | Th | Fr | Sa | Su |
| 22 | | | | 01 | 02 | 03 | 04 |
| 23 | 05 | 06 | 07 | 08 | 09 | 10 | 11 |
| 24 | 12 | 13 | 14 | 15 | 16 | 17 | 18 |
| 25 | 19 | 20 | 21 | 22 | 23 | 24 | 25 |
| 26 | 26 | 27 | 28 | 29 | 30 |

| | July |
| Wk | Mo | Tu | We | Th | Fr | Sa | Su |
| 26 | | | | | | 01 | 02 |
| 27 | 03 | 04 | 05 | 06 | 07 | 08 | 09 |
| 28 | 10 | 11 | 12 | 13 | 14 | 15 | 16 |
| 29 | 17 | 18 | 19 | 20 | 21 | 22 | 23 |
| 30 | 24 | 25 | 26 | 27 | 28 | 29 | 30 |
| 31 | 31 |

| | August |
| Wk | Mo | Tu | We | Th | Fr | Sa | Su |
| 31 | | 01 | 02 | 03 | 04 | 05 | 06 |
| 32 | 07 | 08 | 09 | 10 | 11 | 12 | 13 |
| 33 | 14 | 15 | 16 | 17 | 18 | 19 | 20 |
| 34 | 21 | 22 | 23 | 24 | 25 | 26 | 27 |
| 35 | 28 | 29 | 30 | 31 |

| | September |
| Wk | Mo | Tu | We | Th | Fr | Sa | Su |
| 35 | | | | | 01 | 02 | 03 |
| 36 | 04 | 05 | 06 | 07 | 08 | 09 | 10 |
| 37 | 11 | 12 | 13 | 14 | 15 | 16 | 17 |
| 38 | 18 | 19 | 20 | 21 | 22 | 23 | 24 |
| 39 | 25 | 26 | 27 | 28 | 29 | 30 |

| | October |
| Wk | Mo | Tu | We | Th | Fr | Sa | Su |
| 39 | | | | | | | 01 |
| 40 | 02 | 03 | 04 | 05 | 06 | 07 | 08 |
| 41 | 09 | 10 | 11 | 12 | 13 | 14 | 15 |
| 42 | 16 | 17 | 18 | 19 | 20 | 21 | 22 |
| 43 | 23 | 24 | 25 | 26 | 27 | 28 | 29 |
| 44 | 30 | 31 |

| | November |
| Wk | Mo | Tu | We | Th | Fr | Sa | Su |
| 44 | | | 01 | 02 | 03 | 04 | 05 |
| 45 | 06 | 07 | 08 | 09 | 10 | 11 | 12 |
| 46 | 13 | 14 | 15 | 16 | 17 | 18 | 19 |
| 47 | 20 | 21 | 22 | 23 | 24 | 25 | 26 |
| 48 | 27 | 28 | 29 | 30 |

| | December |
| Wk | Mo | Tu | We | Th | Fr | Sa | Su |
| 48 | | | | | 01 | 02 | 03 |
| 49 | 04 | 05 | 06 | 07 | 08 | 09 | 10 |
| 50 | 11 | 12 | 13 | 14 | 15 | 16 | 17 |
| 51 | 18 | 19 | 20 | 21 | 22 | 23 | 24 |
| 52 | 25 | 26 | 27 | 28 | 29 | 30 | 31 |

== Applicable years ==
=== Gregorian Calendar ===
In the (currently used) Gregorian calendar, alongside Monday, Wednesday, Friday or Saturday, the fourteen types of year (seven common, seven leap) repeat in a 400-year cycle (20871 weeks). Forty-three common years per cycle or exactly 10.75% start on a Sunday. The 28-year sub-cycle only spans across century years divisible by 400, e.g. 1600, 2000, and 2400.

Gregorian common years starting on Sunday
| Century | 1st | 2nd | | 3rd | 4th | | 5th | | 6th | 7th | | 8th | | 9th | 10th | |
|---|---|---|---|---|---|---|---|---|---|---|---|---|---|---|---|---|
| 16th century | prior to first adoption (proleptic) | | | | | | | | | | | | | 1589 | 1595 | |
| 17th century | 1606 | 1617 | | 1623 | 1634 | | 1645 | | 1651 | 1662 | | 1673 | 1679 | — | 1690 | |
| 18th century | 1702 | 1713 | 1719 | — | 1730 | | 1741 | 1747 | 1758 | 1769 | | 1775 | | 1786 | 1797 | |
| 19th century | 1809 | 1815 | | 1826 | 1837 | | 1843 | | 1854 | 1865 | | 1871 | | 1882 | 1893 | 1899 |
| 20th century | 1905 | 1911 | | 1922 | 1933 | 1939 | — | | 1950 | 1961 | 1967 | 1978 | | 1989 | 1995 | |
| 21st century | 2006 | 2017 | | 2023 | 2034 | | 2045 | | 2051 | 2062 | | 2073 | 2079 | — | 2090 | |
| 22nd century | 2102 | 2113 | 2119 | — | 2130 | | 2141 | 2147 | 2158 | 2169 | | 2175 | | 2186 | 2197 | |
| 23rd century | 2209 | 2215 | | 2226 | 2237 | | 2243 | | 2254 | 2265 | | 2271 | | 2282 | 2293 | 2299 |
| 24th century | 2305 | 2311 | | 2322 | 2333 | 2339 | — | | 2350 | 2361 | 2367 | 2378 | | 2389 | 2395 | |

400-year cycle
| 0–99 | 6 | 17 | 23 | 34 | 45 | 51 | 62 | 73 | 79 | 90 | |
| 100–199 | 102 | 113 | 119 | 130 | 141 | 147 | 158 | 169 | 175 | 186 | 197 |
| 200–299 | 209 | 215 | 226 | 237 | 243 | 254 | 265 | 271 | 282 | 293 | 299 |
| 300–399 | 305 | 311 | 322 | 333 | 339 | 350 | 361 | 367 | 378 | 389 | 395 |

=== Julian Calendar ===
In the now-obsolete Julian calendar, the fourteen types of year (seven common, seven leap) repeat in a 28-year cycle (1461 weeks). A leap year has two adjoining dominical letters (one for January and February and the other for March to December, as 29 February has no letter). This sequence occurs exactly once within a cycle, and every common letter thrice.

As the Julian calendar repeats after 28 years that means it will also repeat after 700 years, i.e. 25 cycles. The year's position in the cycle is given by the formula ((year + 8) mod 28) + 1). Years 11, 22 and 28 of the cycle are common years beginning on Sunday. 2017 is year 10 of the cycle. Approximately 10.71% of all years are common years beginning on Sunday.

Julian common years starting on Sunday
| Decade | 1st | | 2nd | | 3rd | | 4th | | 5th | | 6th | | 7th | | 8th | | 9th | | 10th | |
|---|---|---|---|---|---|---|---|---|---|---|---|---|---|---|---|---|---|---|---|---|
| 15th century | 1402 | | 1413 | 1419 | 1430 | | — | | 1441 | 1447 | 1458 | | 1469 | | 1475 | | 1486 | | 1497 | |
| 16th century | 1503 | | 1514 | | 1525 | | 1531 | | 1542 | | 1553 | 1559 | 1570 | | — | | 1581 | 1587 | 1598 | |
| 17th century | 1609 | | 1615 | | 1626 | | 1637 | | 1643 | | 1654 | | 1665 | | 1671 | | 1682 | | 1693 | 1699 |
| 18th century | 1710 | | — | | 1721 | 1727 | 1738 | | 1749 | | 1755 | | 1766 | | 1777 | | 1783 | | 1794 | |
| 19th century | 1805 | | 1811 | | 1822 | | 1833 | 1839 | 1850 | | — | | 1861 | 1867 | 1878 | | 1889 | | 1895 | |
| 20th century | 1906 | | 1917 | | 1923 | | 1934 | | 1945 | | 1951 | | 1962 | | 1973 | 1979 | 1990 | | — | |
| 21st century | 2001 | 2007 | 2018 | | 2029 | | 2035 | | 2046 | | 2057 | | 2063 | | 2074 | | 2085 | | 2091 | |

== Holidays ==
=== International ===
- Valentine's Day falls on a Tuesday
- World Day for Grandparents and the Elderly falls on July 23
- Halloween falls on a Tuesday
- Christmas Day falls on a Monday
- Earliest Easter Sunday falls on March 26, latest Easter Sunday falls on April 23

=== Roman Catholic Solemnities ===
- Epiphany falls on a Friday
- Candlemas falls on a Thursday
- Saint Joseph's Day falls on a Sunday
- The Annunciation of Jesus falls on a Saturday
- The Nativity of John the Baptist falls on a Saturday
- The Solemnity of Saints Peter and Paul falls on a Thursday
- The Transfiguration of Jesus falls on a Sunday
- The Assumption of Mary falls on a Tuesday
- The Exaltation of the Holy Cross falls on a Thursday
- All Saints' Day falls on a Wednesday
- All Souls' Day falls on a Thursday
- The Feast of Christ the King falls on its latest possible date, November 26 (or on October 29 in versions of the calendar between 1925 and 1962)
- The First Sunday of Advent falls on its latest possible date, December 3
- The Immaculate Conception falls on a Friday
- Gaudete Sunday falls on its latest possible date, December 17
- Rorate Sunday falls on its latest possible date, December 24

=== Australia and New Zealand ===
- Australia Day falls on a Thursday
- Waitangi Day falls on a Monday
- Daylight saving ends on April 2
- ANZAC Day falls on a Tuesday
- Mother's Day falls on its latest possible date, May 14
- Father's Day falls on September 3
- Daylight saving begins on its earliest possible date, September 24 in New Zealand and October 1 in Australia

=== British Isles ===
- Saint David's Day falls on a Wednesday
- Mother's Day falls on March 5, March 12, March 19, March 26 or April 2
- Daylight saving begins on March 26
- Saint Patrick's Day falls on a Friday
- Saint George's Day falls on a Sunday
- Father's Day falls on June 18
- Orangeman's Day falls on a Wednesday
- Daylight saving ends on October 29
- Guy Fawkes Night falls on a Sunday
- Saint Andrew's Day falls on a Thursday

=== Canada ===
- Daylight saving begins on March 12
- Mother's Day falls on its latest possible date, May 14
- Victoria Day falls on May 22
- Father's Day falls on June 18
- Canada Day falls on a Saturday
- Labour Day falls on September 4
- Thanksgiving Day falls on October 9
- Daylight saving ends on November 5

=== Denmark ===
- The Constitution Day falls on a Monday

=== Germany ===
- The reunification falls on a Thursday

=== United States ===
- Martin Luther King Jr. Day falls on January 16
- President's Day falls on February 20
- Daylight saving begins on March 12
- Mother's Day falls on its latest possible date, May 14
- Memorial Day falls on May 29
- Father's Day falls on June 18
- Juneteenth falls on a Monday
- Independence Day falls on a Tuesday
- Labor Day falls on September 4
- Grandparents' Day falls on September 10
- Columbus Day falls on October 9
- Daylight saving ends on November 5
- Thanksgiving Day falls on November 23
