= Atri Cathedral =

Cathedral in Atri, Abruzzo, Italy

Coordinates: 42.580276°N 13.978737°E

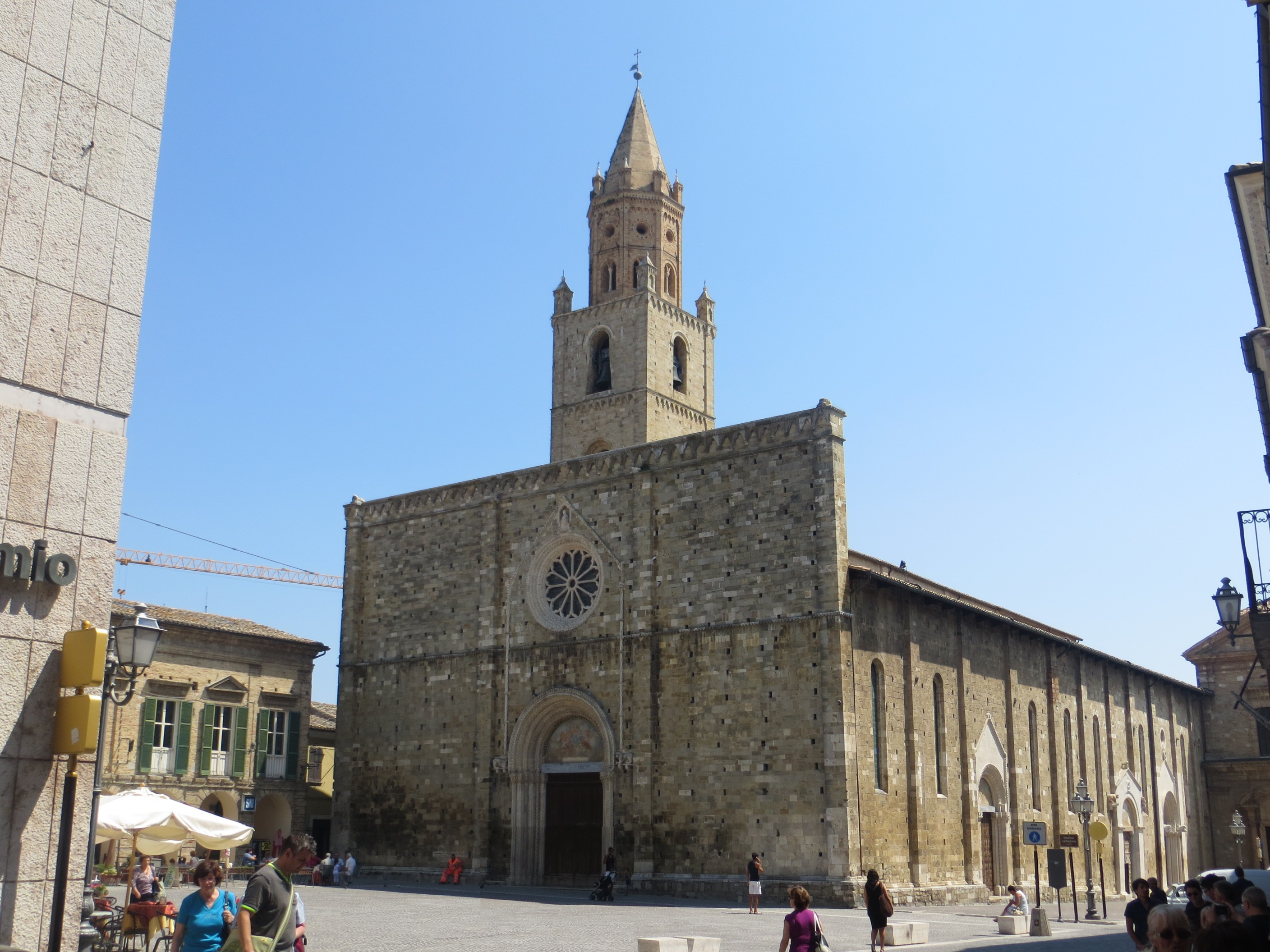
Cathedral from the south-west

Atri Cathedral (Italian: Basilica concattedrale di Santa Maria Assunta; Duomo di Atri) is a Romanesque Roman Catholic cathedral dedicated to the Assumption of the Virgin Mary in the town of Atri, Province of Teramo, region of Abruzzo, Italy.

It was formerly, from 1251, the episcopal seat of the Diocese of Atri (later Penni-Atri) and has been since 1986 a co-cathedral of the Diocese of Teramo-Atri. It was declared a minor basilica in 1964.

== History and description ==
The present church, consecrated in 1223, was built over an earlier one. Further reconstructions occurred during the following two centuries. The sober Istrian white stone façade has a large portal by Maestro Rainaldo in Gothic style, and a large rose window with a niche with a figure of the Virgin and child. The south wall has three portals: that on the left dating from 1305 was the one completed by Rainaldo; the central one dated 1288 with sculptures of lions and symbols of the Angevin dynasty is by Raimondo di Poggio; and that to the right, dated 1302, is also by him. The first one is one of the Holy Doors canonically designated by the Holy See . It is opened every year on August, 15th, the day on which the Assumption of Mary is celebrated. In 1295 there was mention of the Holy Door of Atri, which had been established in that period: it is therefore thought that originally there must have been a small portal which was then replaced with the current one in 1305. We do not know for sure which Pope granted this privilege, perhaps Celestine V (whose mother was from Atri) or Boniface VIII (who had already risen to the papal throne in 1295); even today the Holy Door is solemnly opened in the presence of thousands of people on August 14th and closed 8 days later, on August 22nd.

The church includes on its left a campanile or bell tower 56 metres high (184 ft) high, which was completed by Antonio da Lodi in the 15th century. The tower is surmounted by a pyramidal roof.

The choir contains a fresco cycle by the 15th-century Abruzzi painter Andrea de Litio (or Delitio). The cycle was meant to illustrate the life of Jesus to the less literate; in fact, the descriptive writings on it are not in standard Latin but in Vulgar Latin (the language used by the folk, which then developed into present-day Italian). The characters are often depicted in very intimate, simple surroundings and with details that accentuate the informality of the situations (e.g. domestic animals). Moreover, the clothing are contemporary to the time in which the fresco cycle was painted, therefore not historically accurate. All these details were designed to allow the viewer to identify with the scenes and feel the characters as more familiar.

The cathedral also houses a large organ. The diocesan museum is located adjacent to the cathedral. The crypt was originally a large Roman cistern; another forms the foundation of the ducal palace; and in the eastern portion of the town there is a complicated system of underground passages for collecting and storing water. The adjacent cloister has two storeys.
