= 2034 =

2034 in various calendars
- Gregorian calendar: 2034; MMXXXIV
- Ab urbe condita: 2787
- Armenian calendar: 1483; ԹՎ ՌՆՁԳ
- Assyrian calendar: 6784
- Baháʼí calendar: 190–191
- Balinese saka calendar: 1955–1956
- Bengali calendar: 1440–1441
- Berber calendar: 2984
- British Regnal year: N/A
- Buddhist calendar: 2578
- Burmese calendar: 1396
- Byzantine calendar: 7542–7543
- Chinese calendar: 癸丑年 (Water Ox); 4731 or 4524 — to — 甲寅年 (Wood Tiger); 4732 or 4525
- Coptic calendar: 1750–1751
- Discordian calendar: 3200
- Ethiopian calendar: 2026–2027
- Hebrew calendar: 5794–5795
- Hindu calendars
- Vikram Samvat: 2090–2091
- Shaka Samvat: 1955–1956
- Kali Yuga: 5134–5135
- Holocene calendar: 12034
- Igbo calendar: 1034–1035
- Iranian calendar: 1412–1413
- Islamic calendar: 1455–1456
- Japanese calendar: Reiwa 16 (令和１６年)
- Javanese calendar: 1967–1968
- Juche calendar: 123
- Julian calendar: Gregorian minus 13 days
- Korean calendar: 4367
- Minguo calendar: ROC 123 民國123年
- Nanakshahi calendar: 566
- Thai solar calendar: 2577
- Tibetan calendar: ཆུ་མོ་གླང་ལོ་ (female Water-Ox); 2160 or 1779 or 1007 — to — ཤིང་ཕོ་སྟག་ལོ་ (male Wood-Tiger); 2161 or 1780 or 1008
- Unix time: 2019686400 – 2051222399

2034 (MMXXXIV) will be a common year starting on Sunday of the Gregorian calendar, the 2034th year of the Common Era (CE) and Anno Domini (AD) designations, the 34th year of the 3rd millennium and the 21st century, and the 5th year of the 2030s decade.

== Predicted and scheduled events ==
=== February ===
- February 10–26 – The 2034 Winter Olympics is scheduled to be held in Utah, in the United States.

=== September ===
- September 28 – Lunar eclipse.

=== Date unknown ===
- Switzerland will phase out the last of its nuclear power plants.
- The 2034 FIFA World Cup is set to be held in Saudi Arabia.
- Dragonfly is expected to land on Saturn's moon of Titan.
- End of the project Northern Link (MTR), a rapid transit line in Hong Kong.
- The city of Rochester, New York, will turn 200 and intends to complete its 4th comprehensive plan called "Rochester 2034".
