= Vico Consorti =

Italian sculptor (1902–1979)

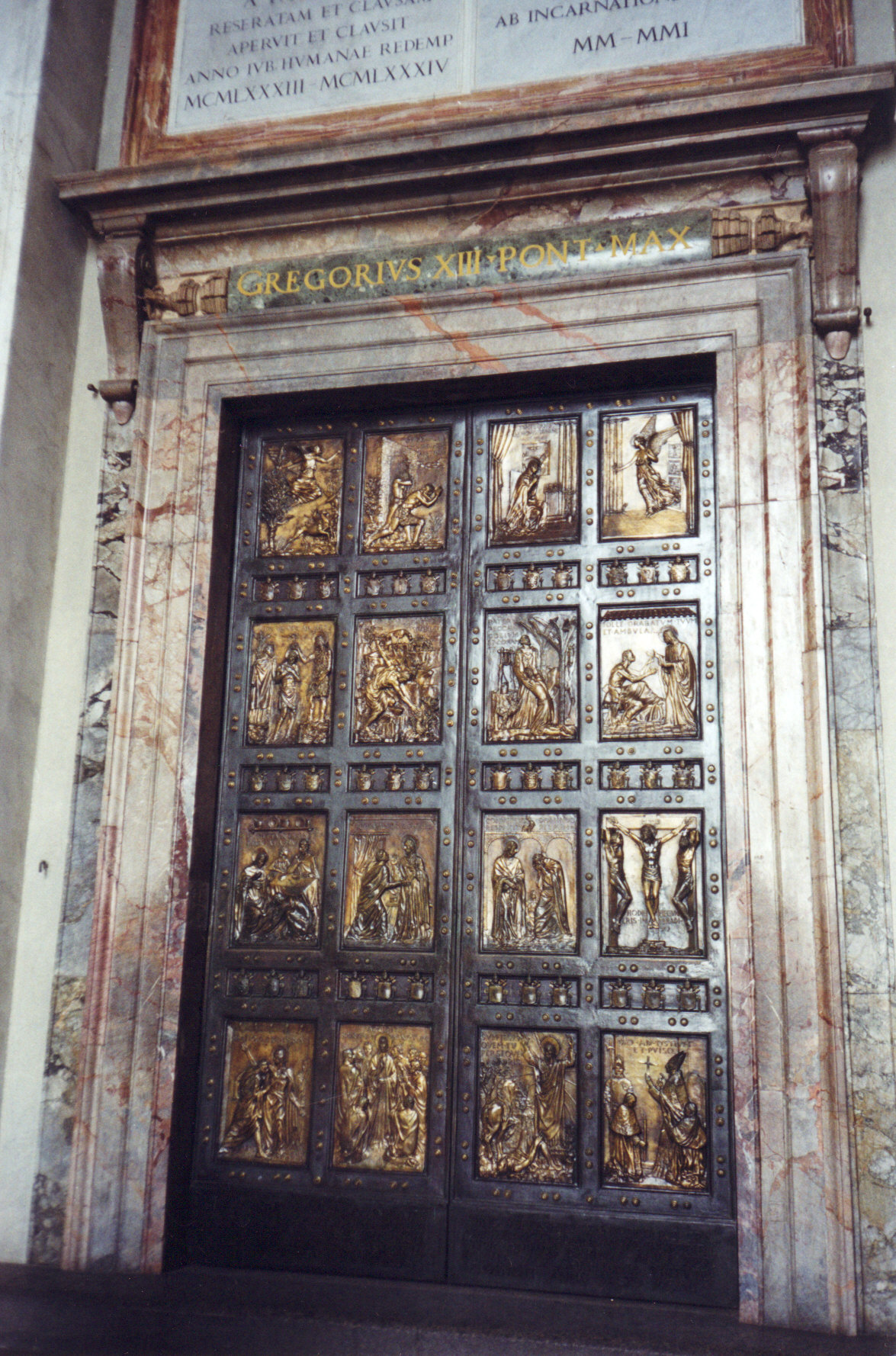
- Porta Santa in St Peter's Basilica
- Born: Ludovico Consorti; 29 July 1902; Semproniano, Roccalbegna, Province of Grosseto, Kingdom of Italy
- Died: 1 June 1979 (aged 76); Siena, Tuscany, Italy
- Occupation: Sculptor

Ludovico Consorti (29 July 1902 – 1 June 1979) was an Italian sculptor who built the bronze Holy Door in St. Peter's Basilica in 1950. In 1980, a year after his death, he received an award from the city of Grosseto for artistic merits.

== Biography ==
Consorti was born in Semproniano, in southern Tuscany in 1902. From 1919 to 1926, he took a sculpturing course in the Art Institute of Siena. Shortly after the end of World War One, Consorti met Guido Chigi-Saracini, when he decided to move to Siena, a city he knew well.

Between 1952 and 1956, Ludovico lived and worked in Colombia leaving important contributions to the cultural heritage of Bogotá and Zipaquira.

== Holy Door ==
The Holy Door (built 1950), was built by Vico at St. Peter's Basilica. The door was consecrated and opened on 24 December 1949. It was ordered by Pope Pius XII.

The door is only opened during the presence of the Pope during the Jubilee years.

== Gallery ==
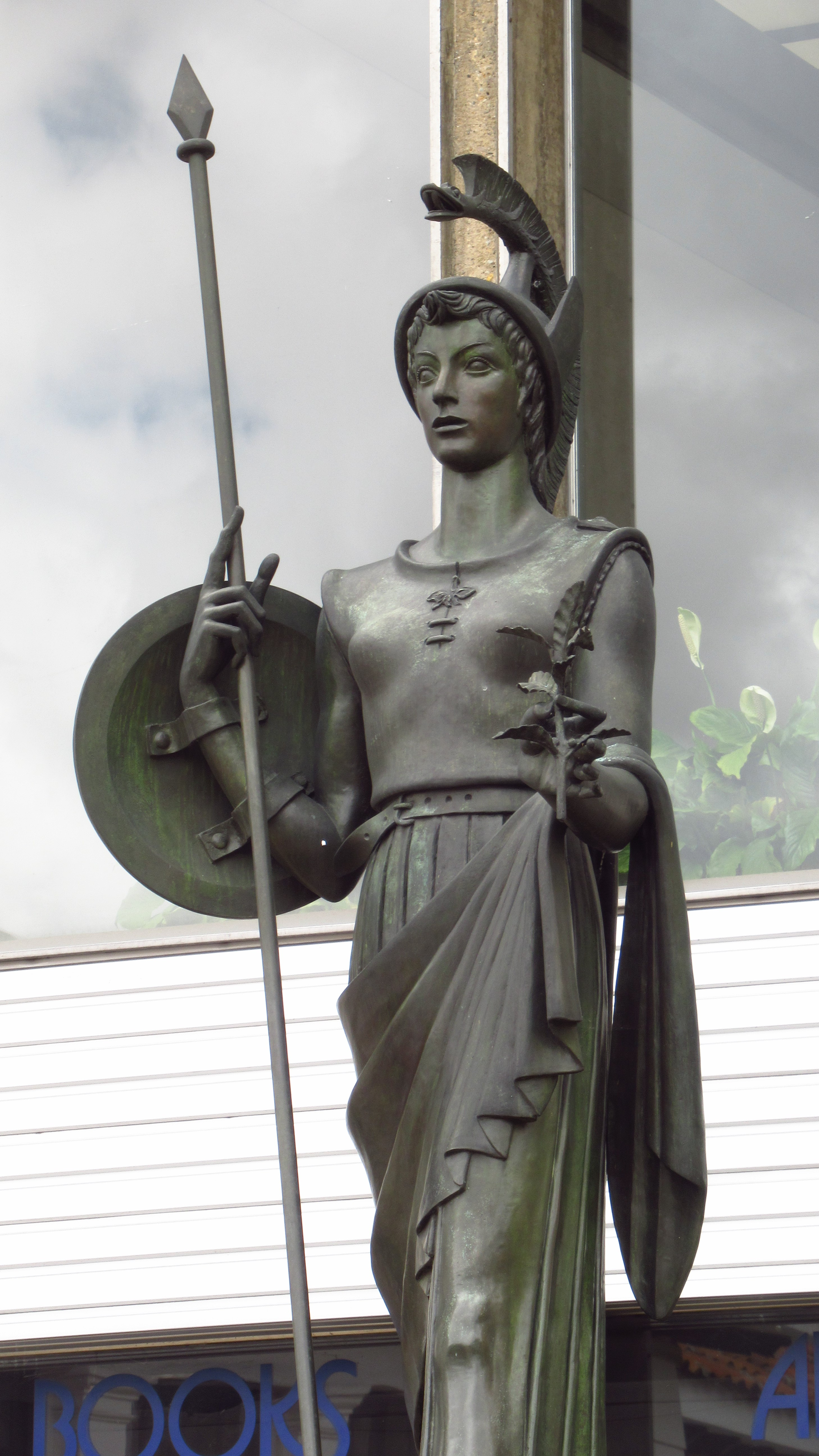
Minerva (1958), Luis Ángel Arango Library, Bogotá

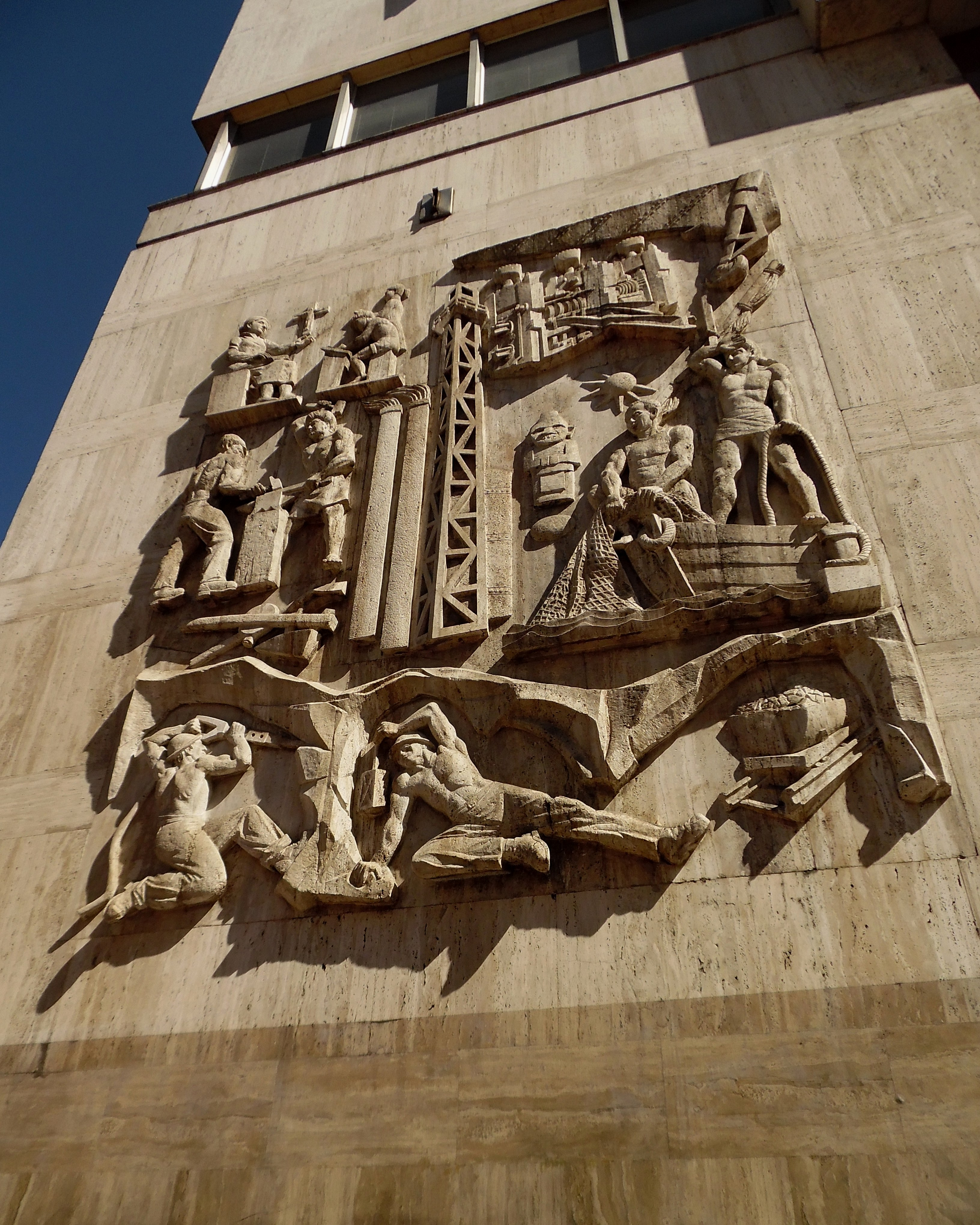
Relieves (1958), Bank of the Republic, Bogotá

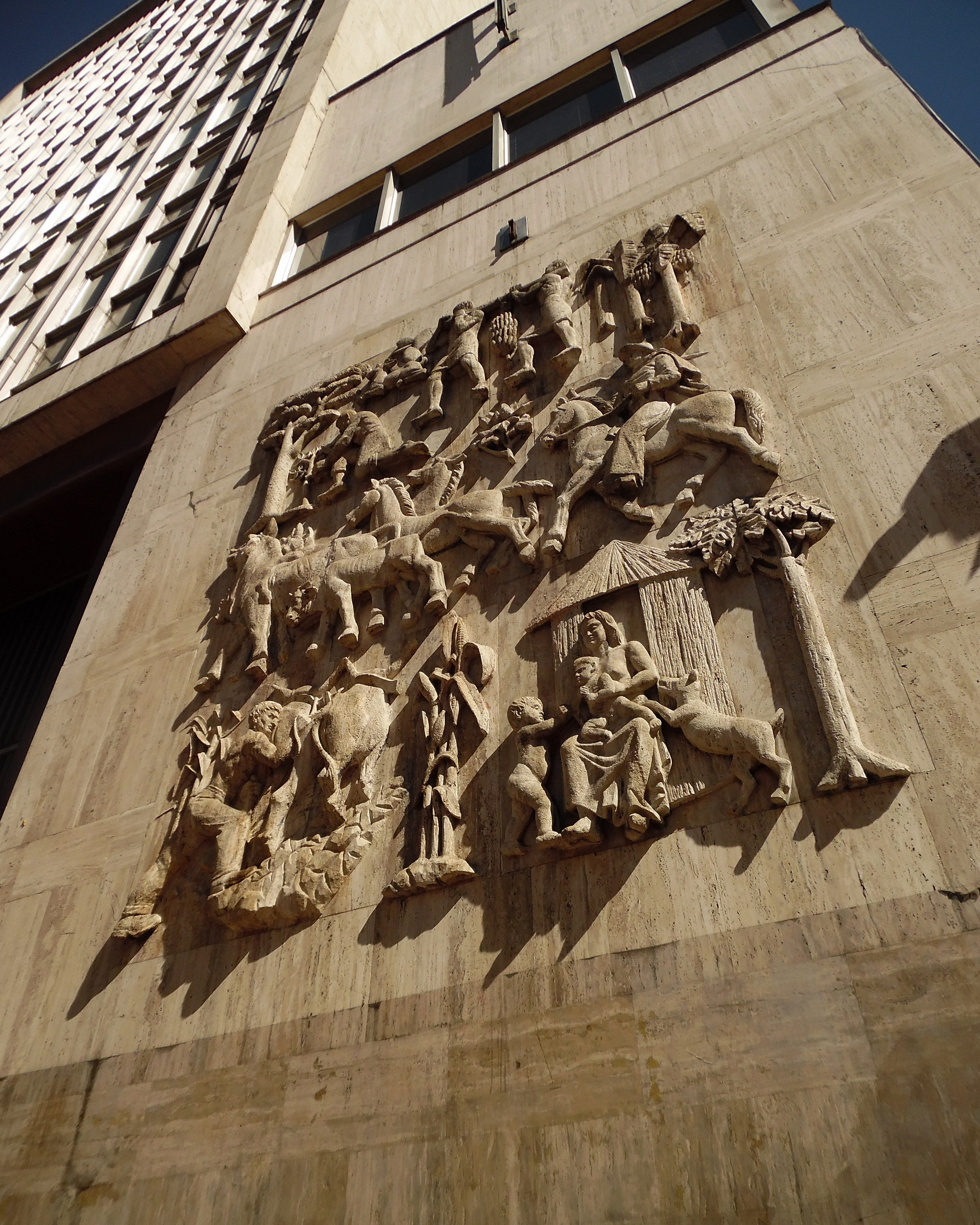
Relieves (1958), Bank of the Republic, Bogotá

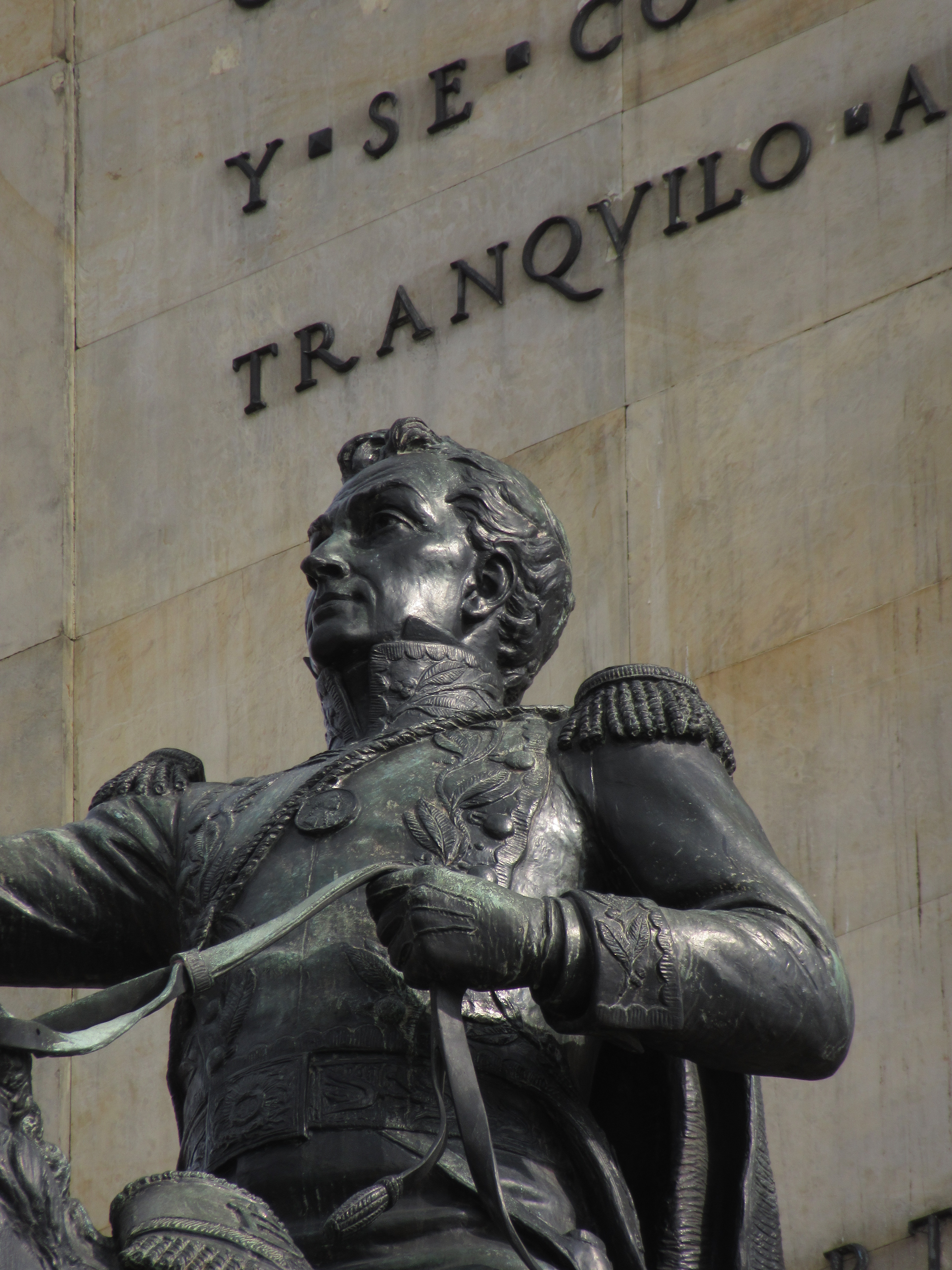
Simón Bolívar (1963), Bogotá
