= Mario Moschi =

Italian sculptor

- Born: 6 May 1896; Lastra a Signa, Italy
- Died: 26 May 1971 (aged 75); Firenze, Italy
- Occupation: Sculptor

Mario Moschi (6 May 1896 – 26 May 1971) was an Italian sculptor. His work was part of the sculpture event in the art competition at the 1936 Summer Olympics.
