= Holy door =

Door in Catholic basilicas opened in Jubilee years

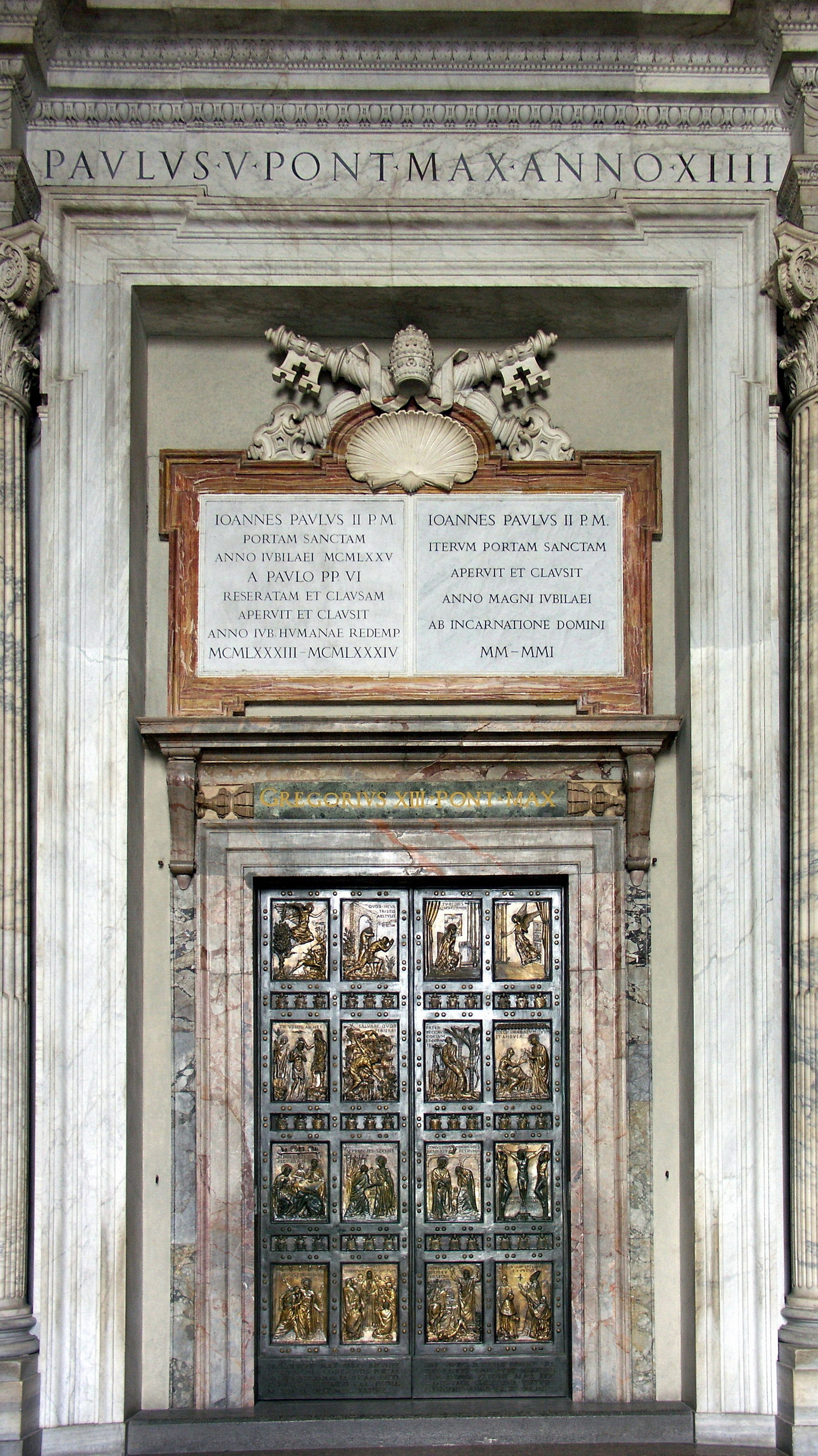
The Holy Door by Vico Consorti, cast by Ferdinando Marinelli Artistic Foundry of Florence, is the northernmost entrance of Saint Peter's Basilica in the Vatican. It will next be opened for the 2033 Jubilee.

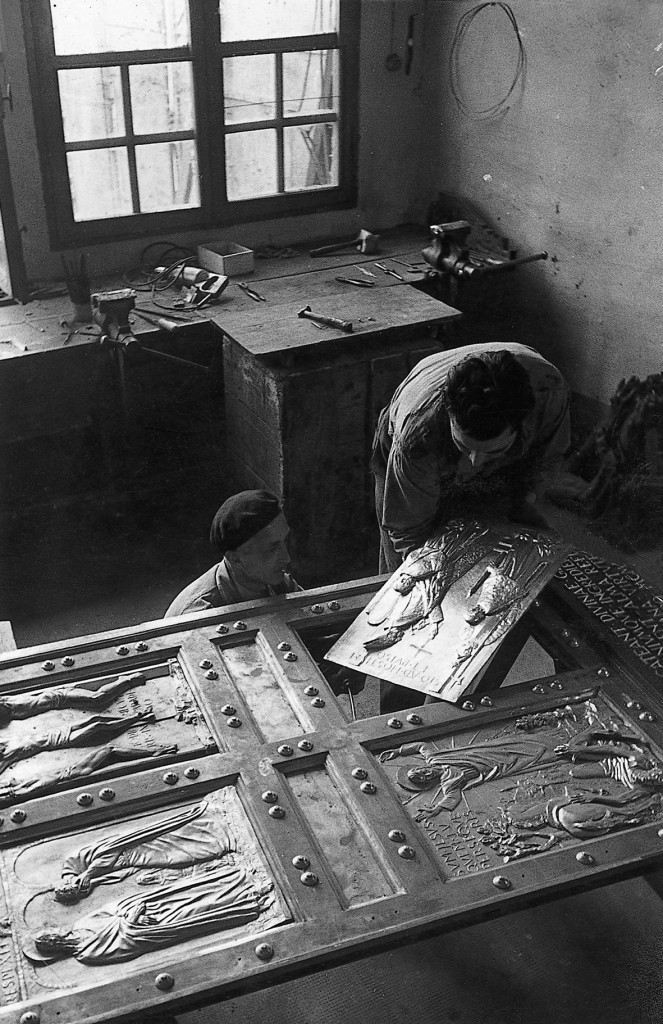
Door leaves for the Holy door at Saint Peter's basilica at the Ferdinando Marinelli Artistic Foundry during the construction of the door

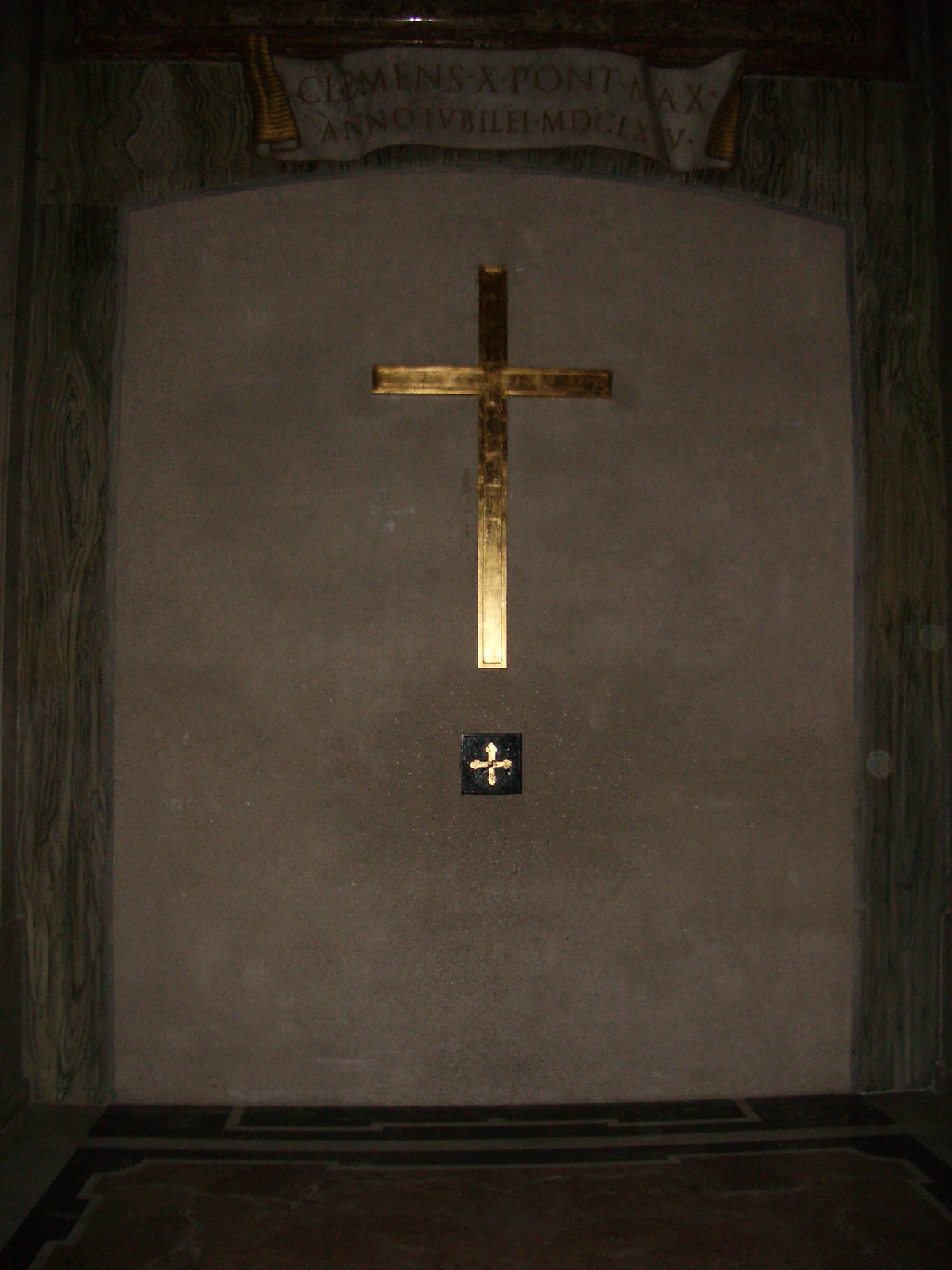
Rear of the Holy Door. Contained inside are several medals and canonical documents from the Pontificate during which the door was last opened. Having been shut since the end of the Extraordinary Jubilee of Mercy, the door was reopened on 24 December 2024 for the 2025 Jubilee, and has been closed since 6 January, 2026.

A Holy Door (Latin: Porta Sancta) is traditionally an entrance portal located within the Papal major basilicas in Rome. The doors are normally sealed by mortar and cement from the inside so that they cannot be opened. They are ceremonially opened during Jubilee years designated by the Pope, for pilgrims who enter through those doors to piously gain the plenary indulgences attached with the Jubilee year celebrations.

In October 2015, Pope Francis expanded the tradition by having each Latin Catholic diocese throughout the world designate one or more local Holy Doors during the Extraordinary Jubilee of Mercy, so that Catholics could gain the plenary indulgences granted during the Jubilee year without having to travel to Rome.

== History ==
In 1300, Pope Boniface VIII began the tradition of the Holy Year, known as a Jubilee. The Catholic Church has celebrated them every 25 years or so ever since. A major part of the Holy Year for Catholics is a pilgrimage to Rome. The ritual passing over the threshold of the holy door symbolises the passing into the presence of God. At the same time, remission of the temporal punishment for the pilgrims' sins is granted, known as an indulgence.

One of the earliest accounts of the Holy Year dates back to a Spanish historian, traveler and pilgrim called Pedro Tafur in 1437. Tafur connects the Jubilee indulgence with the right of sanctuary for those who had escaped persecution. He noted its existence in pagan times for all who crossed the threshold of the Puerta Tarpea, previously upon the site of the Archbasilica of St. John Lateran. Accordingly, at the request of Emperor Constantine I, Pope Sylvester I published a Papal Bull proclaiming the same immunity from punishment for Christian sinners who took sanctuary there.

The privilege was quickly abused and at some point was even commercialised, resulting in popes ordering the door to be sealed with a wall, only to be unsealed during Jubilee years. The wall was destroyed and the door opened once in a hundred years. This was later reduced to fifty years and now "opened at the will of the Pope".

In 1450, the Florentine merchant Giovanni Rucellai of Viterbo cites that the first Jubilee door was opened in 1423 under the pontificate of Pope Martin V.

Rucellai, who lived at the time also speaks of the five doors of the Lateran basilica:

One of which is always walled up except during the Jubilee year, when it is broken down at Christmas when the Jubilee commences. The devotion which the populace has for the bricks and mortar of which it is composed is such that at the unwalling, the fragments are immediately carried off by the crowd, and the foreigners take them home as so many sacred relics ... Out of devotion every one who gains the indulgence passes through that door, which is walled up again as soon as the Jubilee is ended.

Pope Alexander VI expanded the rite of the Jubilee year of 1500 by opening other doors in Saint Peter's Basilica, Basilica of Saint Mary Major, and the Basilica of Saint Paul Outside the Walls. This jubilee year began on Christmas and ended on the Feast of the Epiphany 1501.

During the reign of Pope John VII the holy doors were opened every 33 years, reflecting the number of years attributed to the lifespan of Jesus Christ. This was later amended to 50 years in commemoration of the Hebrew custom of Jubilees and later changed to a centenary or at any time at the will of the reigning Pontiff.

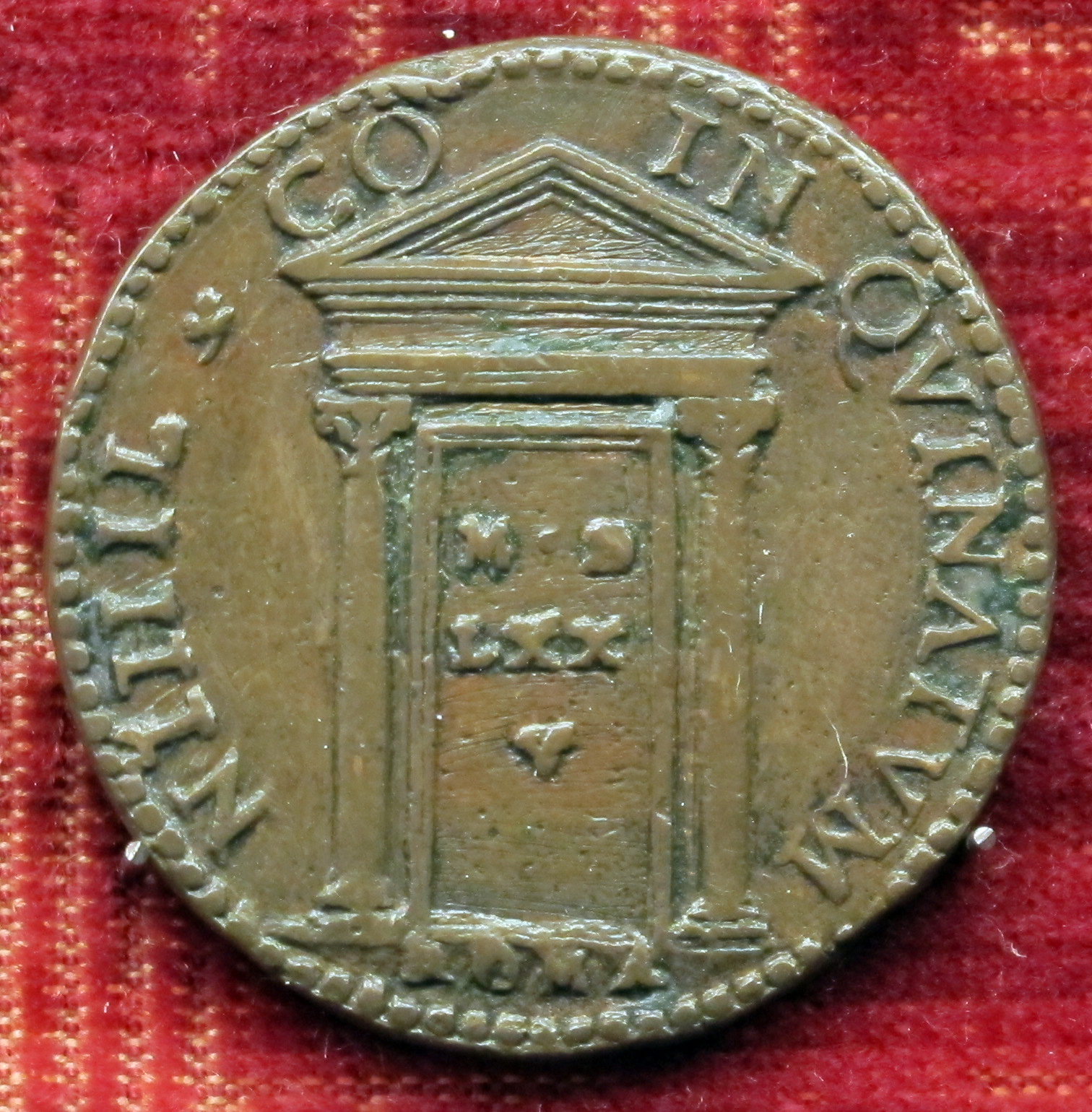
Jubilee commemorative medal of Gregory XIII, 1575

Between 1500 and 1974, the entrance portal was barricaded by a solid wall, not a door. The popes began the ritual destruction of these walls, followed by masons, who completed the task of demolishing it. This rite was nearly always the principal subject depicted on the Jubilee medals issued by the Popes who have opened and closed the holy door at the beginning and end of each Jubilee year. Each of the four basilicas has its own holy door.

After closing the Holy Year on Christmas Day 1950, Pope Pius XII replaced the wooden doors installed by Pope Benedict XIV in 1748, which had begun to fall into disrepair, with the 16-panelled bronze doors, modelled by Vico Consorti and cast by Ferdinando Marinelli Artistic Foundry, that are seen today.

== Symbolism ==
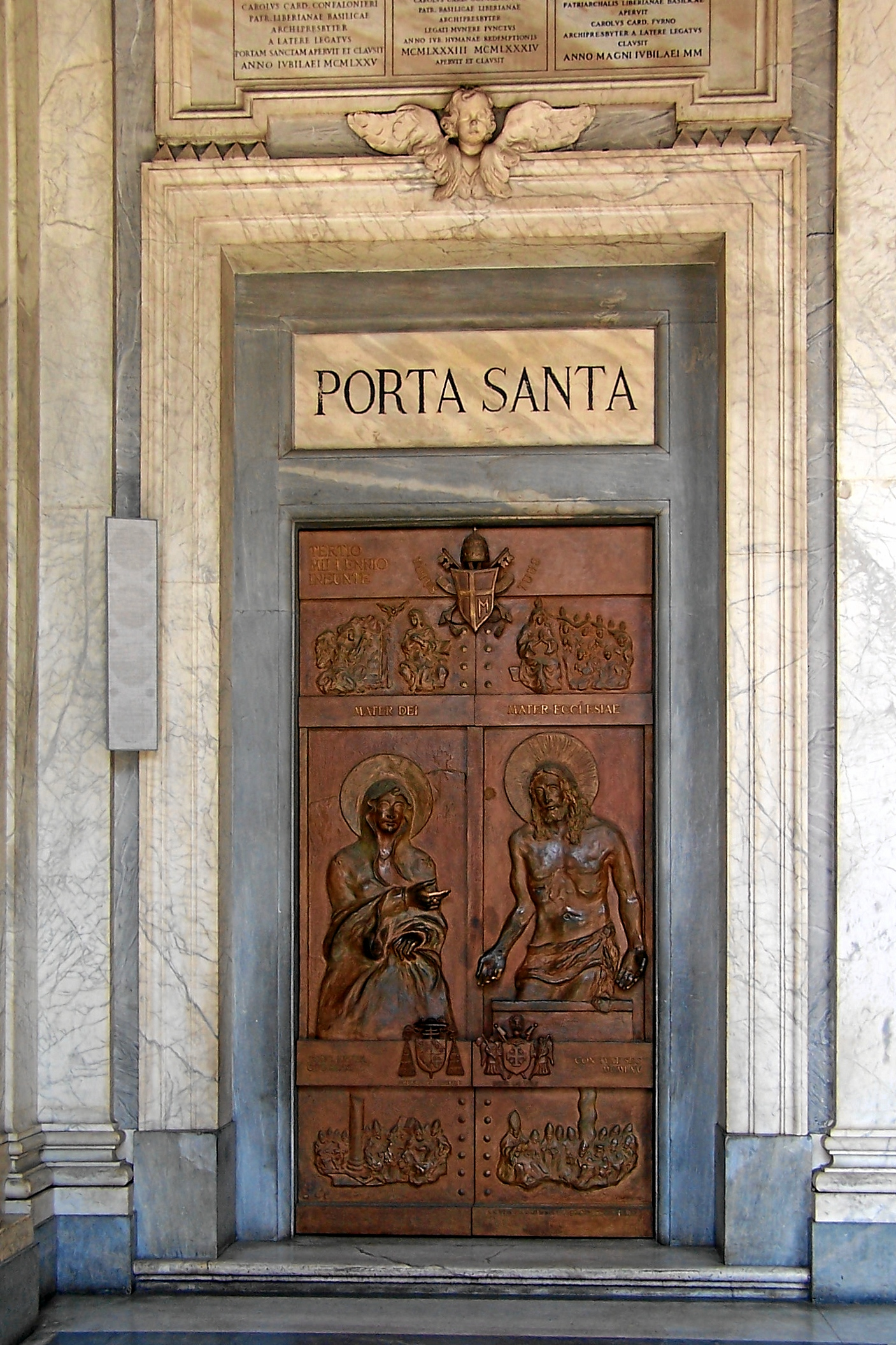
The Holy Door at the church of Santa Maria Maggiore in Rome

In John 10:9, Jesus is quoted as saying, "I am the gate. Whoever enters through me will be saved." In Luke 11:9 is found, "And I tell you, ask and you will receive; seek and you will find; knock and the door will be opened to you." Revelations 3:20 says, "Behold, I stand at the door and knock. If anyone hears my voice and opens the door, (then) I will enter his house and dine with him, and he with me." Dom Albert Hammenstede O.S.B. noted that Porter was one of the minor orders. Herbert Thurston suggests that "the symbolism of this ceremony may also have been influenced by the old idea of seeking sanctuary".

In the papal bull, Incarnationis mysterium of 29 November 1998, Pope John Paul II formally announced the Great Jubilee of 2000 saying that the Holy Door "evokes the passage from sin to grace". The Holy Door represents "a ritual expression of conversion".

"A Holy Door ... is a visual symbol of internal renewal, which begins with the willing desire to make peace with God, reconcile with your neighbors, restore in yourself everything that has been damaged in the past, and reshape your heart through conversion."

== After the Second Vatican Council ==
The most distinctive feature in the ceremonial of the jubilee is the unwalling and the final walling up of the "holy door" in each of the four great basilicas which the pilgrims are required to visit. The doors are opened by the pope at the beginning of the jubilee and then sealed up again afterwards. Historically, the doors were sealed with concrete. The Pontiff would use a silver hammer to remove it at the opening and a silver trowel to seal it again after the Jubilee. The Pope would pound on the wall, which would then be set to collapse. In 1975, Pope Paul VI, in light of the modernising changes of the Second Vatican Council, revised the rite by removing the use of trowel and ornate bricks at the closing rite.

This ritual caused injury to bystanders, and to Pope Paul VI himself while striking down the door, so for the Great Jubilee of 2000, Pope John Paul II simplified the rite considerably. Workers removed the concrete before the ceremony, so that the Pope only had to push on the doors with his hands. The holy door of St. Peter's Basilica was opened by the Pope on 24 December 1999. The doors of St. John Lateran and St. Mary Major were opened on 25 December and 1 January, respectively.

Breaking with tradition, the Pope opened both of these personally, rather than delegating this to a cardinal. The doors of the Basilica of Saint Paul Outside the Walls were opened in an ecumenical ceremony on 18 January, first day of the World Week of Prayer for Christian Unity by the Pope, the Archbishop of Canterbury and a representative of the Ecumenical Patriarch. The door in St. Peter's was closed on 6 January 2001, with the others being closed one day earlier.

Until the Great Jubilee of 2000, the Pope knocked upon the door three times with a silver hammer, singing the versicle "Open unto me the gates of justice".

Above the holy door in St. Peter's are marble memorial plates commemorating the last two times that the door has been opened. Since John Paul II and Francis held the last two Jubilees, both plates indicate that they opened and closed the door.

The 2025 Jubilee marked the first time a pope will have opened the holy door of St. Peter's, but not live to close the holy door at the end of the Jubilee; in this case, Francis opened the door at the beginning of the Jubilee and his successor Pope Leo XIV ceremoneously closed the holy door when the jubilee ended on Epiphany 2026. The passageway will be bricked up again until the next Extraordinary Jubilee, probably in 2033.

== Holy Year of Mercy ==
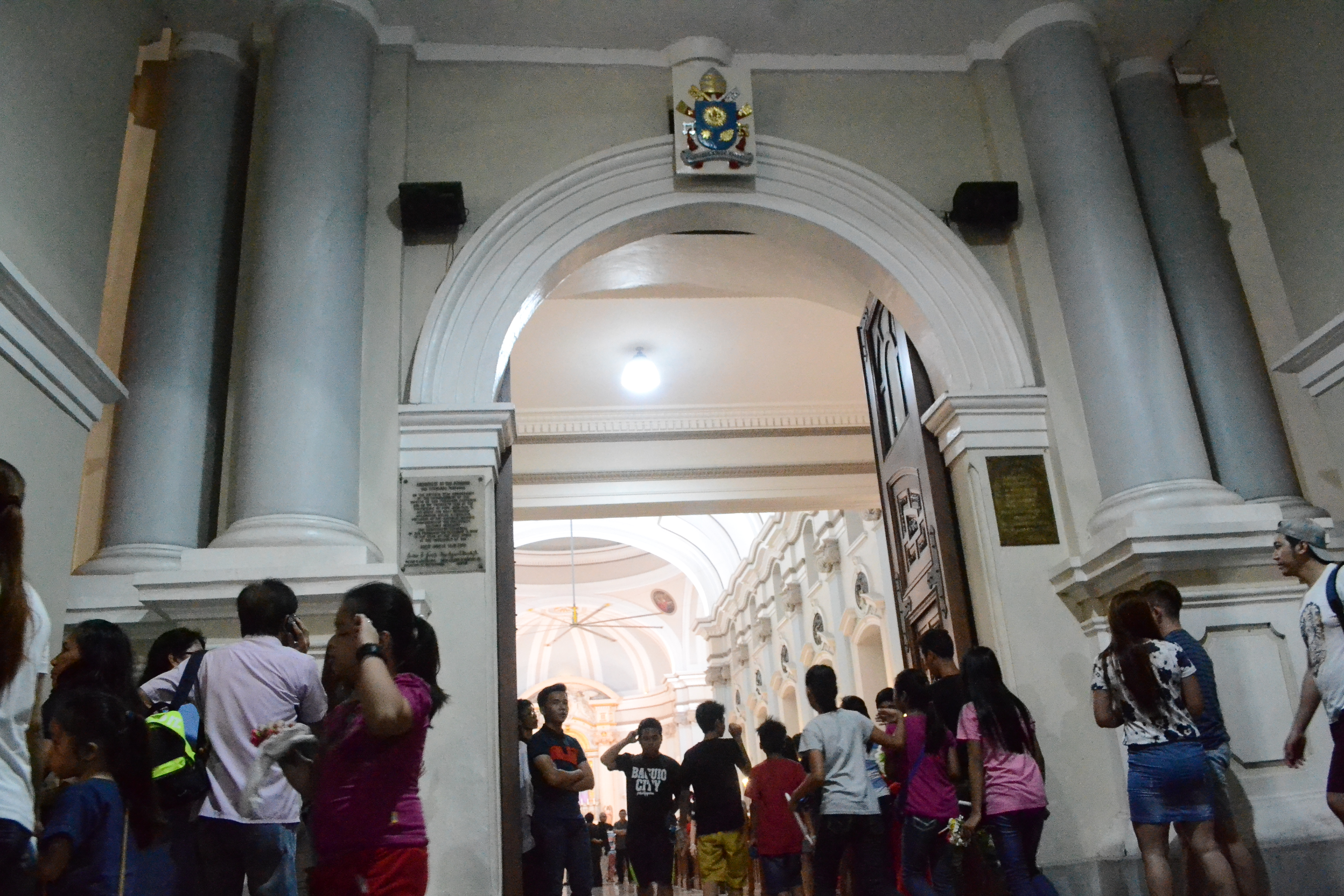
The holy door of the Metropolitan Cathedral of San Fernando for the Holy Year of Mercy

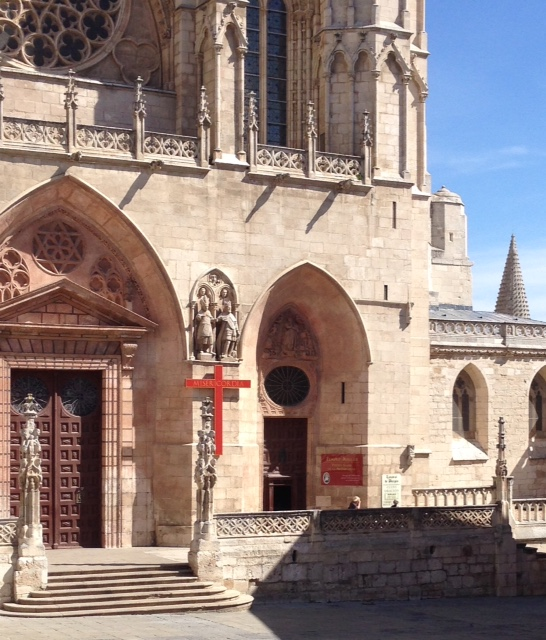
The holy door of Burgos Cathedral (Spain) for the Holy Year of Mercy

In 2015, in announcing the Extraordinary Jubilee of Mercy, Pope Francis declared, "The Holy Door will become a Door of Mercy through which anyone who enters will experience the love of God who consoles, pardons, and instills hope." On 8 December 2015, Pope Francis opened the Holy Door of Mercy in the Basilica of St. Peter, marking the official start of the Jubilee Year of Mercy. A few days later, he presided at the opening of the Holy Door at the Archbasilica of St John Lateran. The Holy Door at St Paul's Outside the Walls was opened by the Archpriest of that Basilica, Cardinal James Harvey. Pope Francis later opened the Holy Door at St Mary Major and at the Caritas center near Rome's central train station.

Francis broke with tradition in removing the necessity of traveling to Rome. In October 2015, a temporal privilege was extended by Pope Francis through the Papal bull of Indiction, "Misericordiae Vultus" for an ordinary bishop to designate his own Holy Door for the purpose of the "Jubilee Year of Mercy". Holy Doors were to be designated in every diocese throughout the world, and could be located at the diocesan Cathedral or at other popular church shrines.

On 29 November 2015, prior to the official 8 December start of the Jubilee Year of Mercy, Pope Francis opened the Holy Door at the Cathédrale Notre-Dame in Bangui, Central African Republic. Holy Doors were subsequently opened in 40 different countries around the world, including locations such as Westminster Cathedral, Prinknash Abbey in Gloucestershire, and St. Paul's Basilica in Toronto. In 2024, religious officials in Bethlehem expressed the hope that the Pope would declare the Door of Mercy at the Church of the Nativity a holy door.

== Other Holy Doors canonically designated by the Holy See ==
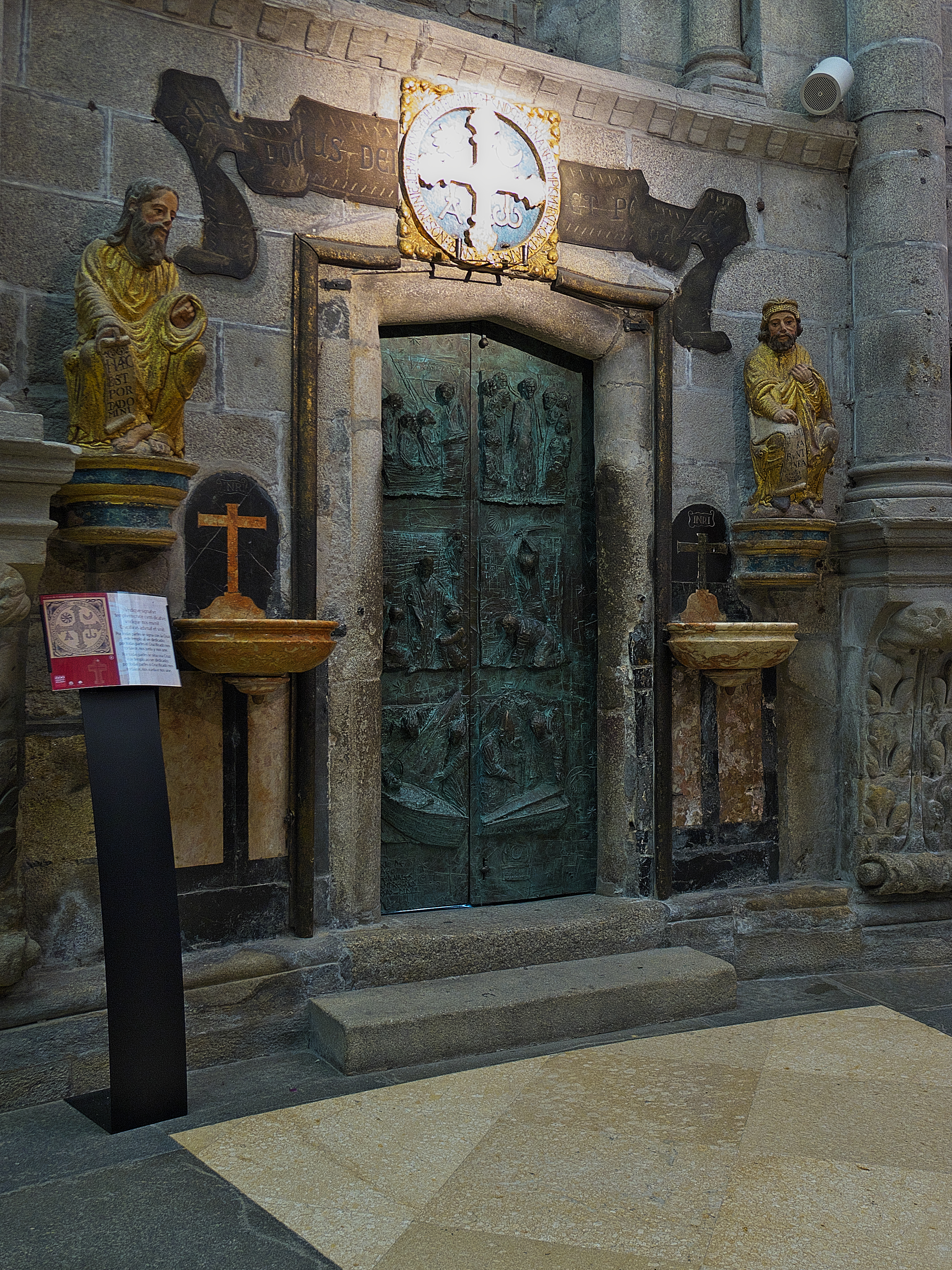
Holy door at the Cathedral of Santiago de Compostela

The following is a list of Holy Doors designated in perpetuity by the Holy See.

- The oldest Holy Door outside Rome is in Santa Maria di Collemaggio church in L'Aquila in Italy built in an uncertain year in the 14th century for the Celestinian Forgiveness.
- In 1295 there was mention of a Holy Door in the main church of Atri, which had been established in that period: it is therefore thought that originally there must have been a small portal which was then replaced with the current one in 1305. We do not know for sure which Pope granted this privilege, perhaps Celestine V (whose mother was from Atri) or Boniface VIII (who had already risen to the papal throne in 1295). Every year the Holy Door is solemnly opened on August 14 and closed 8 days later, on August 22.[1]
- Pope Alexander III granted this privilege to the Cathedral of Santiago de Compostela in Spain by pontifical decree through his papal bull Regis Æterni on 25 July 1178, the Feast of Saint James, principal patron of Spaniards.
- Pope Benedict XVI granted the privilege of opening a holy door to the Sanctuary of Saint John Vianney, Cure of Ars, in Formans, France in July 2007 for the 150th memorial death anniversary of Saint John Vianney.
- Pope Benedict XVI granted a holy door to the Pontifical University of Santo Tomas in Manila, Philippines on 21 December 2010, to honour the university's 400th anniversary in 2011.
- Pope Francis gave the Cathedral of Notre-Dame in the city of Quebec, Canada, the privilege of opening a Holy Door on 8 December 2023 to mark its Jubilee Year as the first Catholic parish in North America north of Mexico, celebrating the 350th anniversary since its foundation on 11 July 1666. It was sealed in December 2024 and would not be reopened during the 2025 Jubilee.

Holy Doors of the world designated by the Holy See
Designated location	Place	Nation
Saint Peter's Basilica	Vatican City	(Vatican City)
Archbasilica of St. John Lateran	Rome	(Italy)
Basilica of Saint Mary the Great	Rome	(Italy)
Basilica of Saint Paul Outside the Walls	Rome	(Italy)
Santa Maria di Collemaggio	L'Aquila	(Italy)
Atri Cathedral	Atri	(Italy)
Santiago de Compostela Cathedral	Galicia, Spain	(Spain)
Pontifical University of Santo Tomas Chapel	Manila, Philippines	(Philippines)
Sanctuary of the Curé of Ars	Ars-sur-Formans, France	(France)
Notre-Dame Basilica-Cathedral	Quebec, Canada	(Canada)

== Conspiracy theories ==
In December 2024, viral posts on Instagram, TikTok, Reddit, and Facebook variously claiming falsely that the pope would be opening "spiritual portals" or "sacred portals" in a "never-before-performed" ritual as part of the 2025 Jubilee celebrations. Some posts also erroneously claimed that the ritual included opening a "tomb of Lucifer" under the Vatican. The claim of a new ritual appeared to stem from a New York Post article with a misleading title referring to the opening of an additional door at a Rebibbia prison.

It is unclear where the Tomb of Lucifer claim originated. Bible scholar Daniel McClellan stated that a tomb in the Vatican Necropolis labeled as the "Tomb of Lucifer" may have begun the rumor and explained that that in pre-Constantinian times when the tomb was constructed, the name Lucifer did not have Satanic connotations and that contemporary Christians even had Lucifer as their personal name.

== See also ==
- Jubilee (Christianity)
