= Transitus =

Christian term for transition from death to life

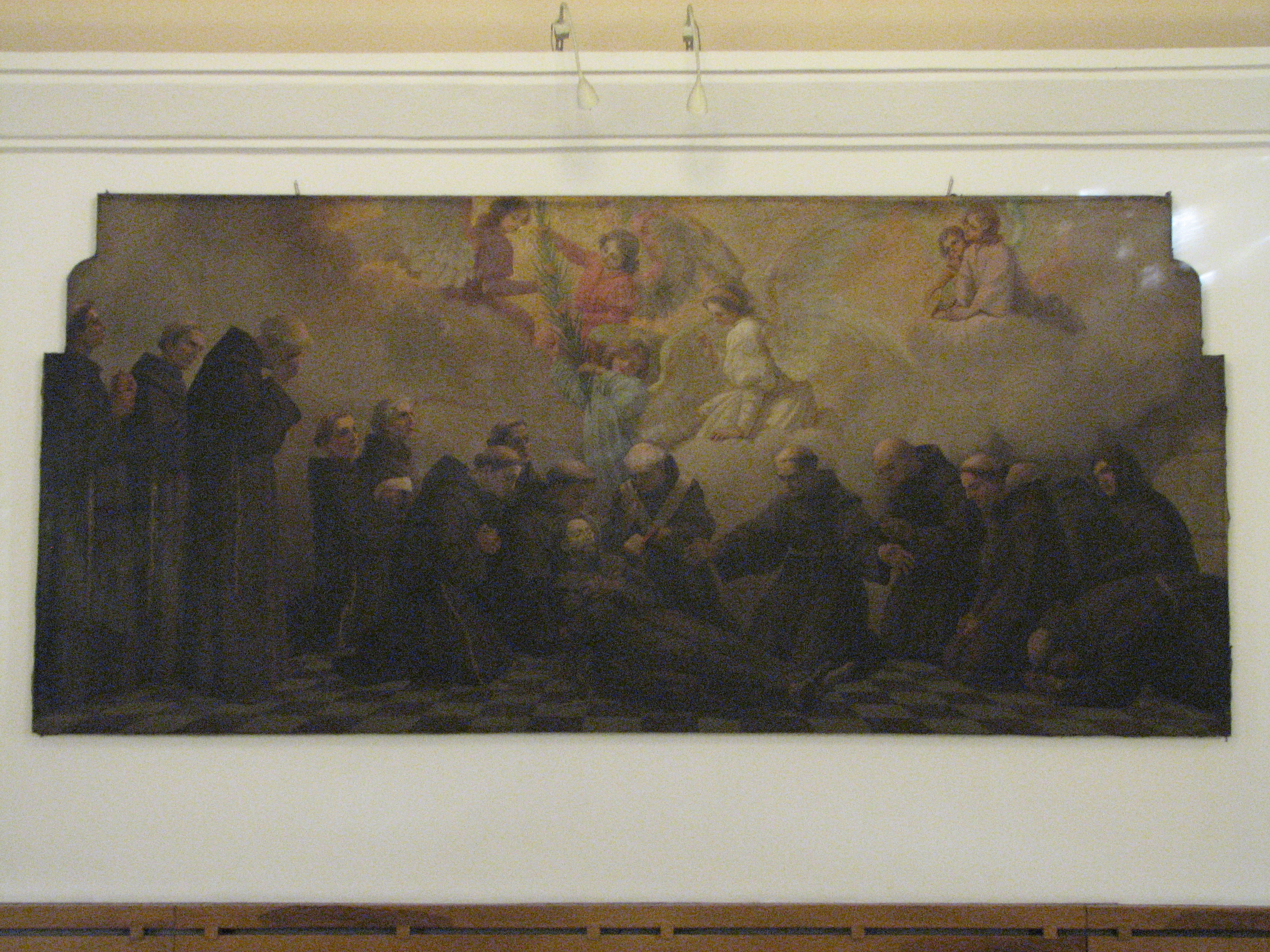
The Transitus of St. Francis of Assisi by Otto Kowalewski (1914)

In Western Christianity, the Transitus (translation from Ecclesiastical Latin: crossing) refers to "the time of passage through death to life".

The Christian theologian German Martinez writes that:

The idea of death in the Latin transitus (transition, passing over) represents a unique Christian terminology linked to the paschal mystery. It consecrates the passage of the dying to eternal life. Offering the sacrifice of his or her personal life, the believer shares in the paschal transitus of Christ himself.

== Observance ==
With reference to various Christian religious orders, liturgies for observing the Transitus may differ.

Franciscans in general observe the Transitus of Saint Francis of Assisi on October 3, the eve of his feast. However, there is not a single liturgy for the Transitus among the different branches, and "therefore many expressions have developed" for this service.

In the Methodist Order of Saint Luke, lessons from Psalm 23, Romans 1:4–8, and 1 Peter 1:3 are read; consequently anointing with holy anointing oil takes place.

== See also ==
- Ablution in Christianity
- Allhallowtide
- Christian burial
- Last Judgement
