= Valentina Stevanovska =

Macedonian sculptor (born 1969)

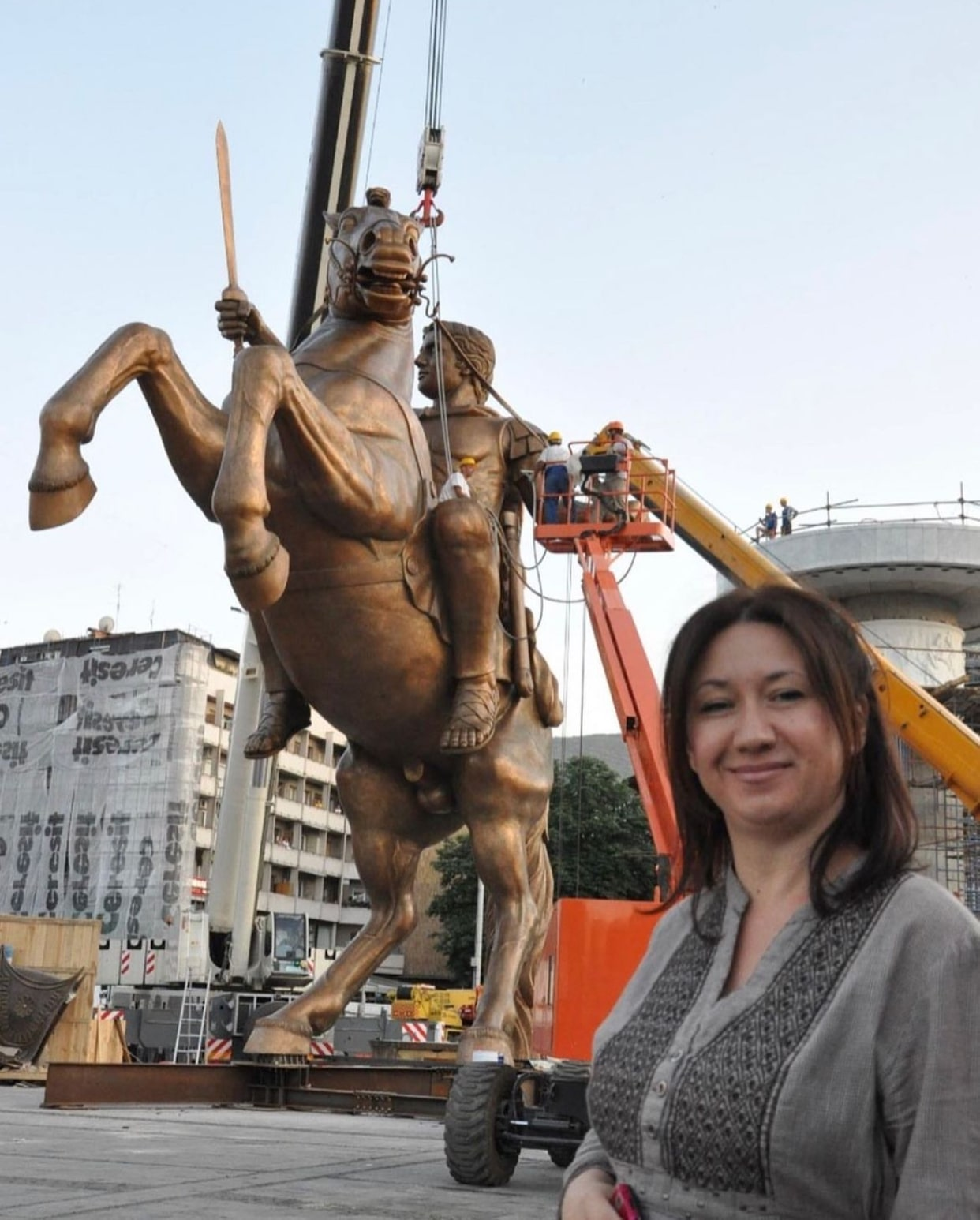
- Born: 30 April 1969 (age 57); Skopje, SR Macedonia, Yugoslavia
- Education: International University of Novi Pazar (DFA)
- Known for: Sculpture, wood engraving
- Notable work: Fountain of Alexander the Great, Porta Macedonia

Valentina Karanfilova-Stevanovska (Macedonian: Валентина Каранфилова-Стевановска; born 30 April 1969) is a Macedonian sculptor mainly known for her art works for the Skopje 2014 project. She is the author of iconic landmarks in the capital city of North Macedonia, including the Fountain of Alexander the Great, Porta Macedonia and the Fountain of Philip II of Macedon. Stevanovska has also participated in numerous domestic and international exhibitions and has received multiple awards.

== Biography ==
Stevanovska graduated from the Sculpture Department in the Faculty of Fine Arts Skopje in 2004. In 2008, she completed her master's degree at the Faculty of Fine Arts in Skopje. In 2017, she completed her Doctorate of Fine Arts at the International University of Novi Pazar in Serbia. Valentina has been a professor at the Faculty of Fine Arts in Skopje since 2010. She has been a member of the Association of Fine Artists of Macedonia since 2004.

== Fountain of Alexander the Great ==
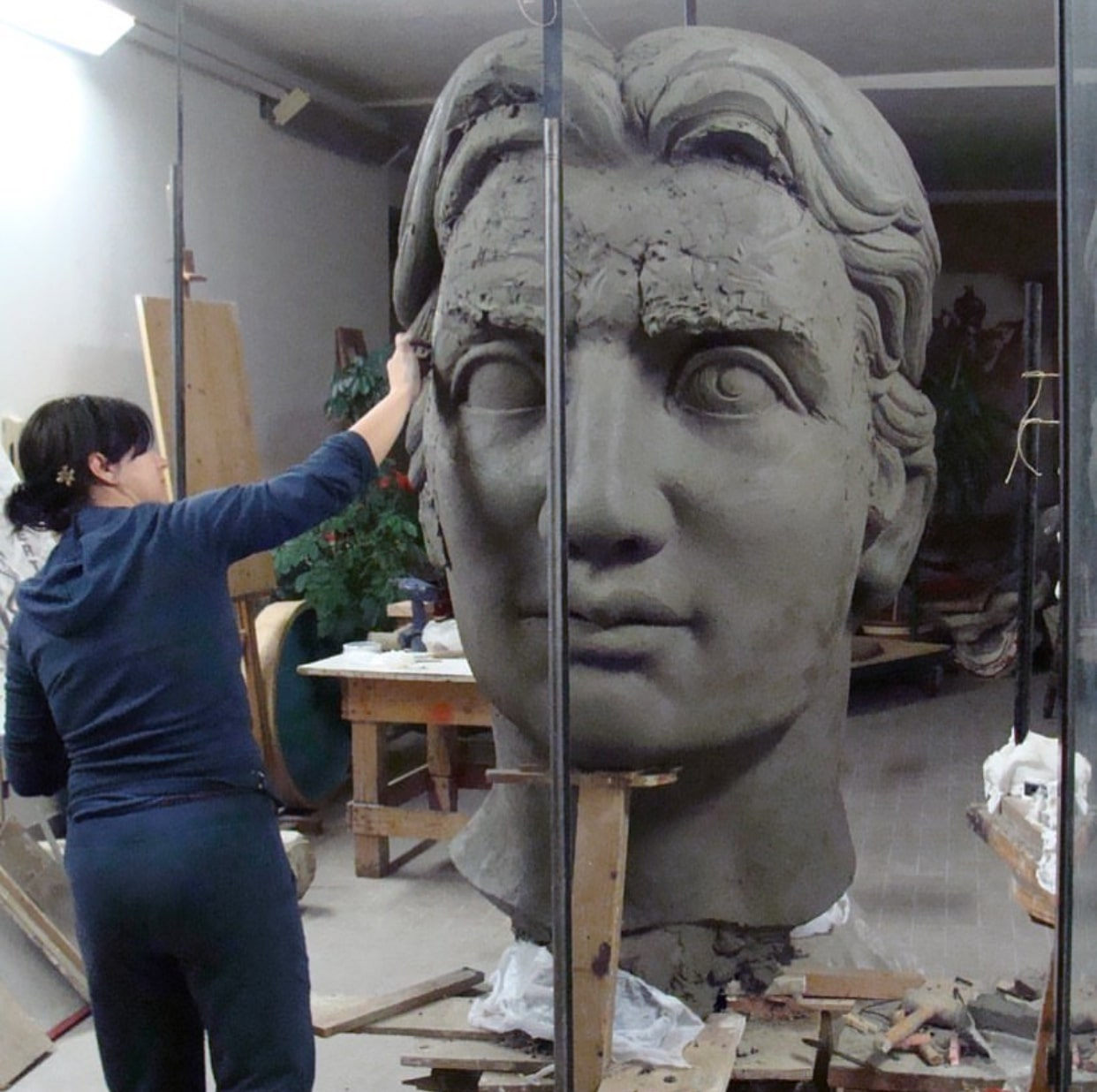
Stevanovska sculpting the head of Alexander the Great

The Fountain of Alexander the Great (Warrior on Horseback) is the tallest fountain in the world that consists of a horseman sculpture made in bronze, sitting at 30 meters tall. It is located at the centre of Macedonia Square in Skopje and it was unveiled on 8 September 2011, on the 20th anniversary of Macedonia's independence referendum from Yugoslavia. The whole art work consists of: a 14.5 meters tall horseman statue of Alexander the Great, 8 statues of lions in natural size, 8 warriors of the Macedonian phalanx, a mosaic and 3 tall reliefs depicting the biggest battles that Alexander the Great has won. All the statues of the fountain were cast in bronze by the Ferdinando Marinelli Artistic Foundry in Florence, Italy.

== List of art works ==
- Philip II of Macedonia Horseman (2011), Municipality of Gazi Baba, Skopje, Macedonia
- Macedonian Phalanx Fountain (2011), Municipality of Gazi Baba, Skopje, Macedonia
- Monument "In Love", Pavilion (2011), Macedonia Square, Skopje, Macedonia
- Alexander the Great Horseman with accompanying figures and fountain (2011), Macedonia Square, Skopje, Macedonia
- Arch Macedonia (2012), Skopje, Macedonia
- Philip II Monument with accompanying figures and fountain (2012), Philip II Square, Skopje, Macedonia
- Macedonian Mothers Fountain (2012), Philip II Square, Skopje, Macedonia
- Two Fountains with Flora and Fauna (2012), Philip II Square, Skopje, Macedonia
- Four Sculptures on the Ministry of Foreign Affairs Building (2012), Skopje, Macedonia
- Seven Human Figures on the Bridge of Civilisations (2013), Skopje, Macedonia
1. Monument of Audoleon (King of Paeonia, 315 - 275/4 BC)
2. Monument of Julia Tertila (a prominent citizen and benefactor of Heraclea Lyncestis, 2nd century AD)
3. Monument of Bishop Budios (Attendee of the First Council of Nicaea, 325 AD)
4. Monument of Aurelius Cratetus Ptolemy (Lychnidos intellectual, 3rd century AD)
5. Monument of Titus Flavius Orestes (a respectable citizen and high priest of Heraclea Lyncestis, 2nd-3rd century AD)
6. Monument of Publius Septius Nicolaus (distinguished citizen of Stobi, 3rd century AD)
7. Monument of Dionysius (first bishop of Lychnidos, 4th century AD)
- Two Lion Sculptures at the entrance of the Macedonian National Theatre (2013), Skopje, Macedonia
- Monument of Hristo Tatarčev (2013), Skopje, Macedonia
- Monument of Boris Sarafov (2013), Skopje, Macedonia
- Relief on the Tympanum of the Archeological Museum of Macedonia (2014), Skopje, Macedonia
- Monument of Alexander the Great (2014), Elementary School "Alexander III of Macedonia", Skopje, Macedonia
- Monument of Nikola Petrov Rusinski (2014), Skopje, Macedonia
- Monument of St. Lydia (2014), Bogorodica Square, Skopje, Macedonia
- Four Sculptures on the Agency for Electronic Communications Building (2014), Skopje, Macedonia
- Sculptures on the Tympanon of the Government of Macedonia Building (2015), Skopje, Macedonia
- Wooden Engraved Door on the entrance of the Government of Macedonia Building (2015), Skopje, Macedonia
- Monument of the Holocaust on the Jews in Macedonia (2015), Skopje, Macedonia
- Monument of St. Elijah with two accompanying sculptures and reliefs for the facade of the ELEM Building (2015), Skopje, Macedonia
- Reliefs on the Panko Brashnarov Palace (Agency for Audio and Audiovisual Services) (2015), Skopje, Macedonia
- Ten Sculptures on the Ministry of Transport and Communications Building (2015), Skopje, Macedonia
- Eleven Reliefs on the Faculty of Dramatic Arts Building (2016), Skopje, Macedonia
- Monument of the Refugee Children from Aegean Macedonia (2016), Skopje, Macedonia
- Fountain of Mother Theresa with accompanying sculptures (finished, but not set up), Macedonia Square, Skopje, Macedonia
- Sixteen sculptures and reliefs for the facade of the building of PUIK (finished, but not set up), Skopje, Macedonia

== Art gallery ==
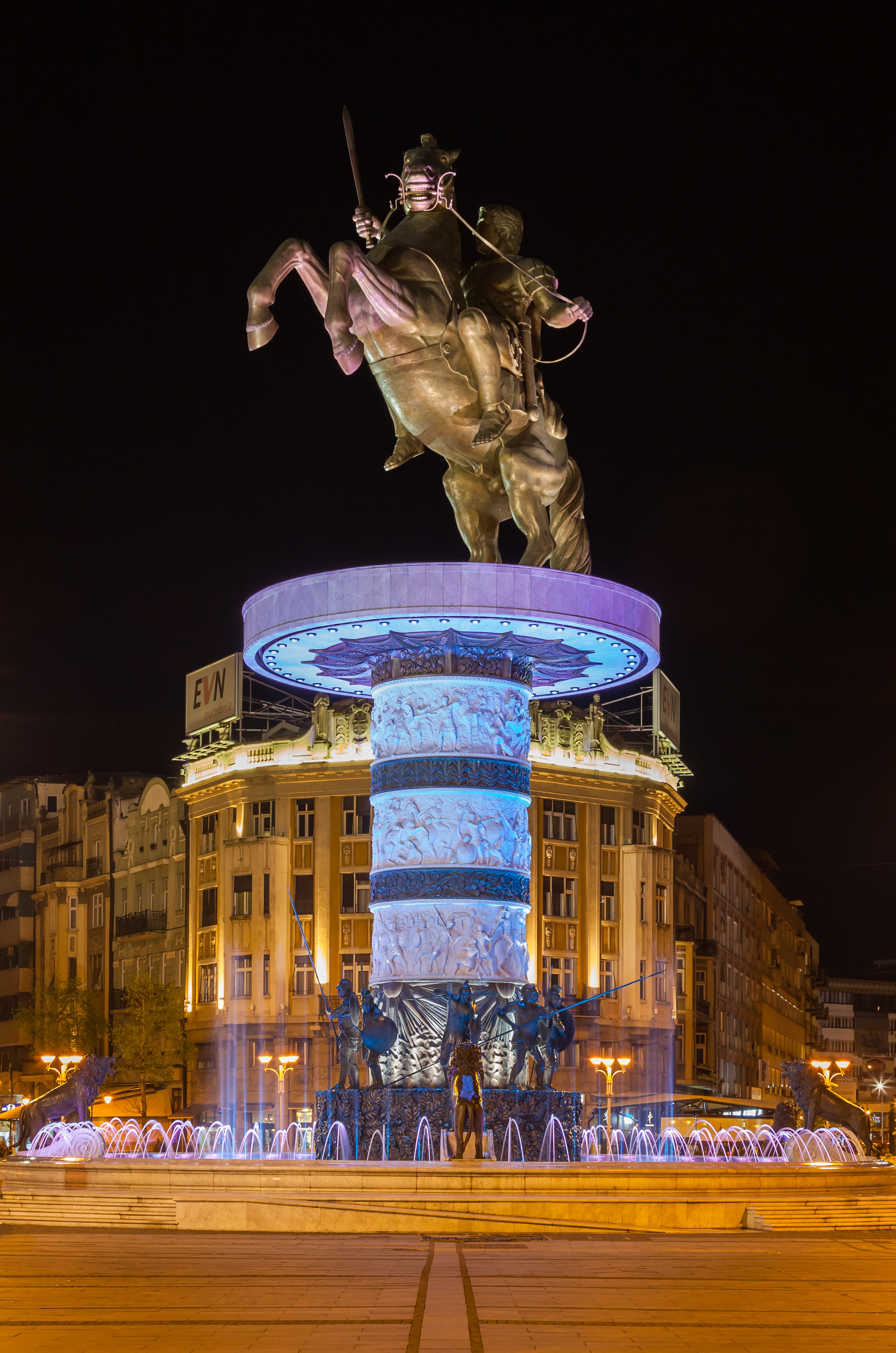
Fountain of Alexander the Great (2011), Skopje

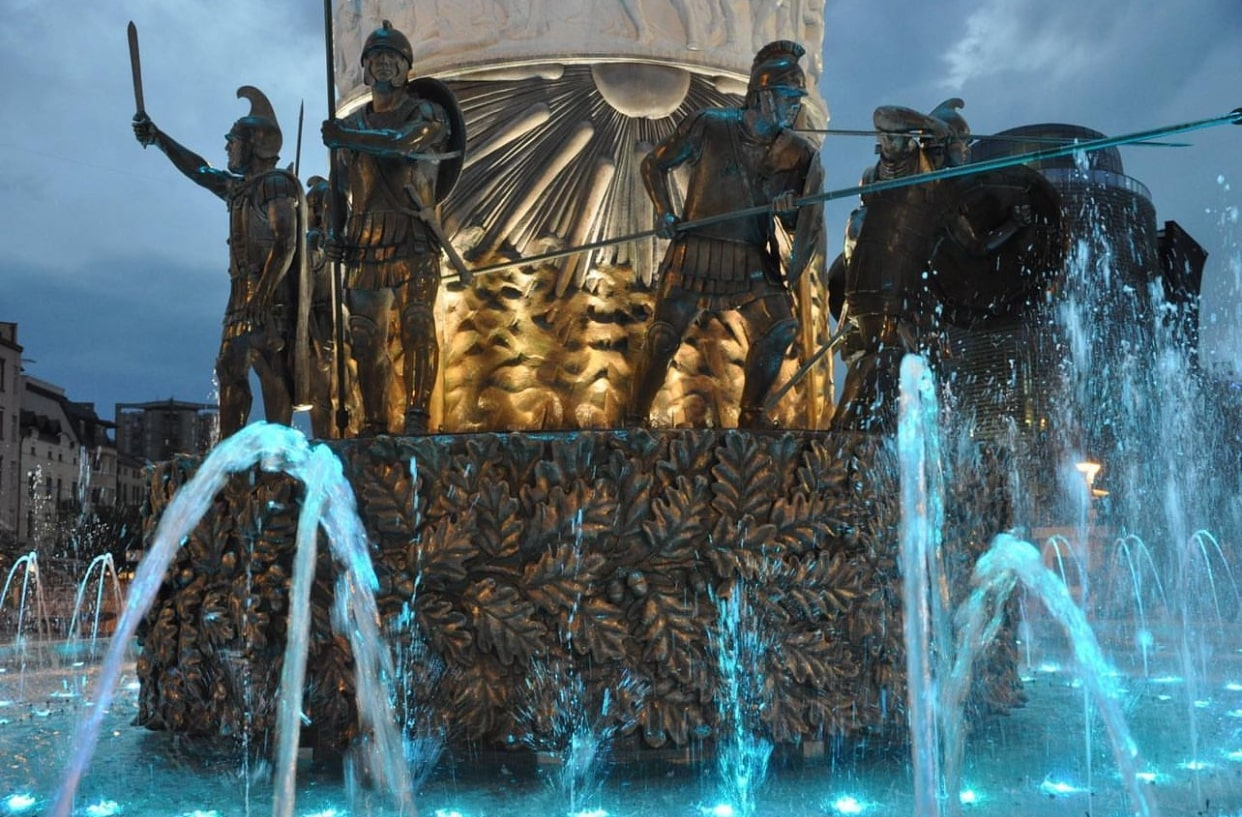
Warrior Sculptures on the Fountain of Alexander the Great (2011), Skopje

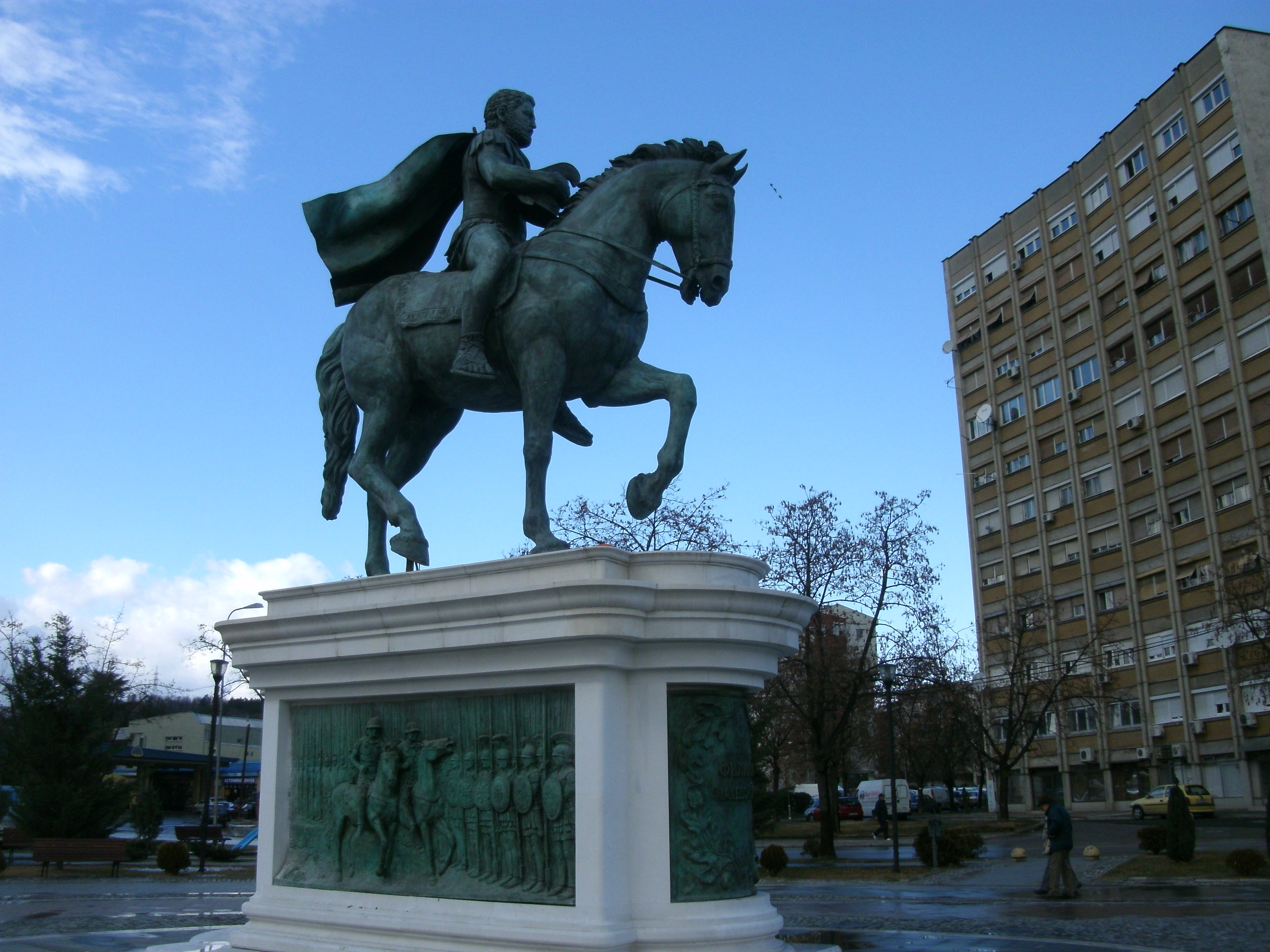
Philip II of Macedonia Horseman (2011), Avtokomanda, Skopje

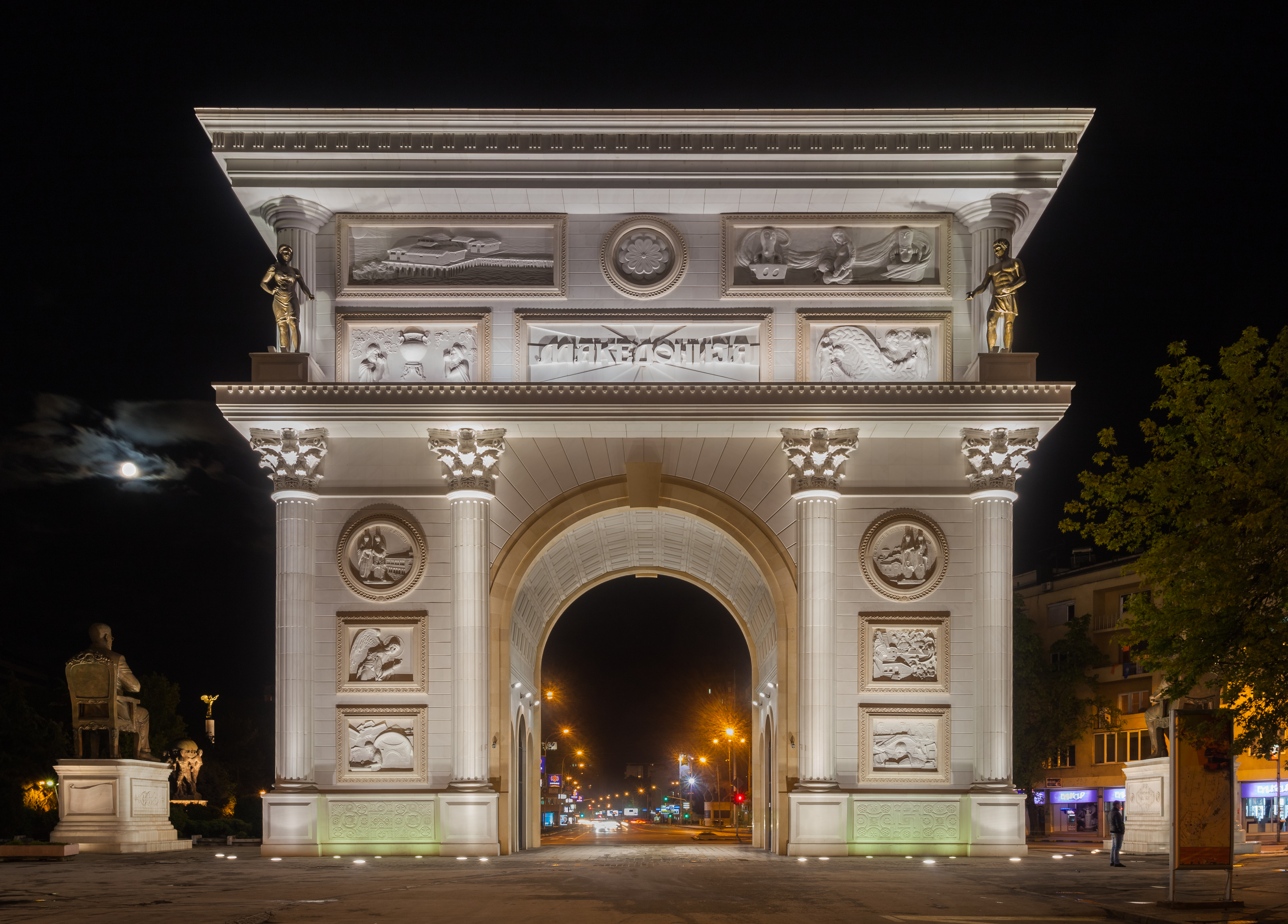
Arch Macedonia (2012), Skopje

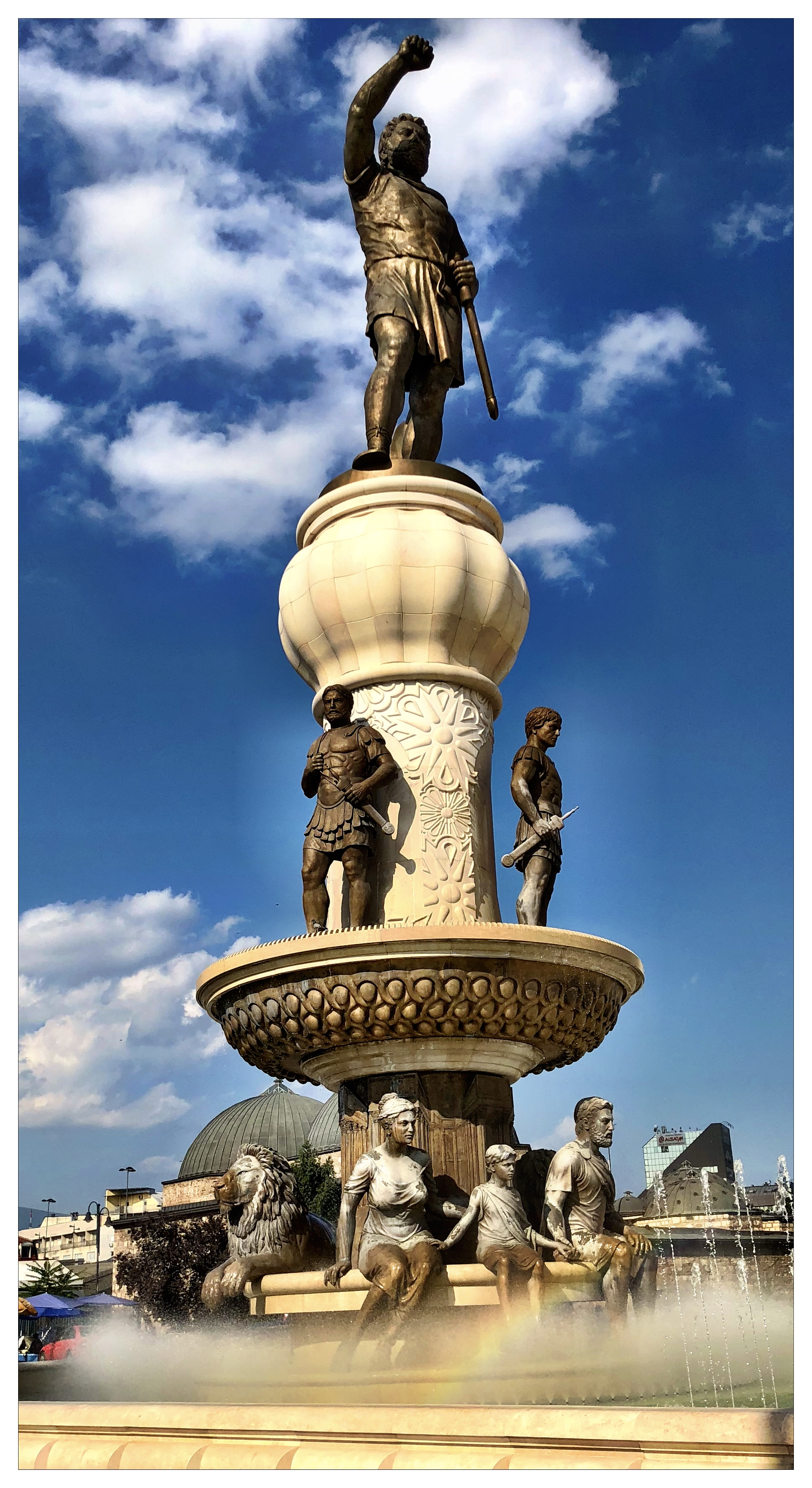
Philip II Monument with accompanying figures and fountain (2012), Skopje

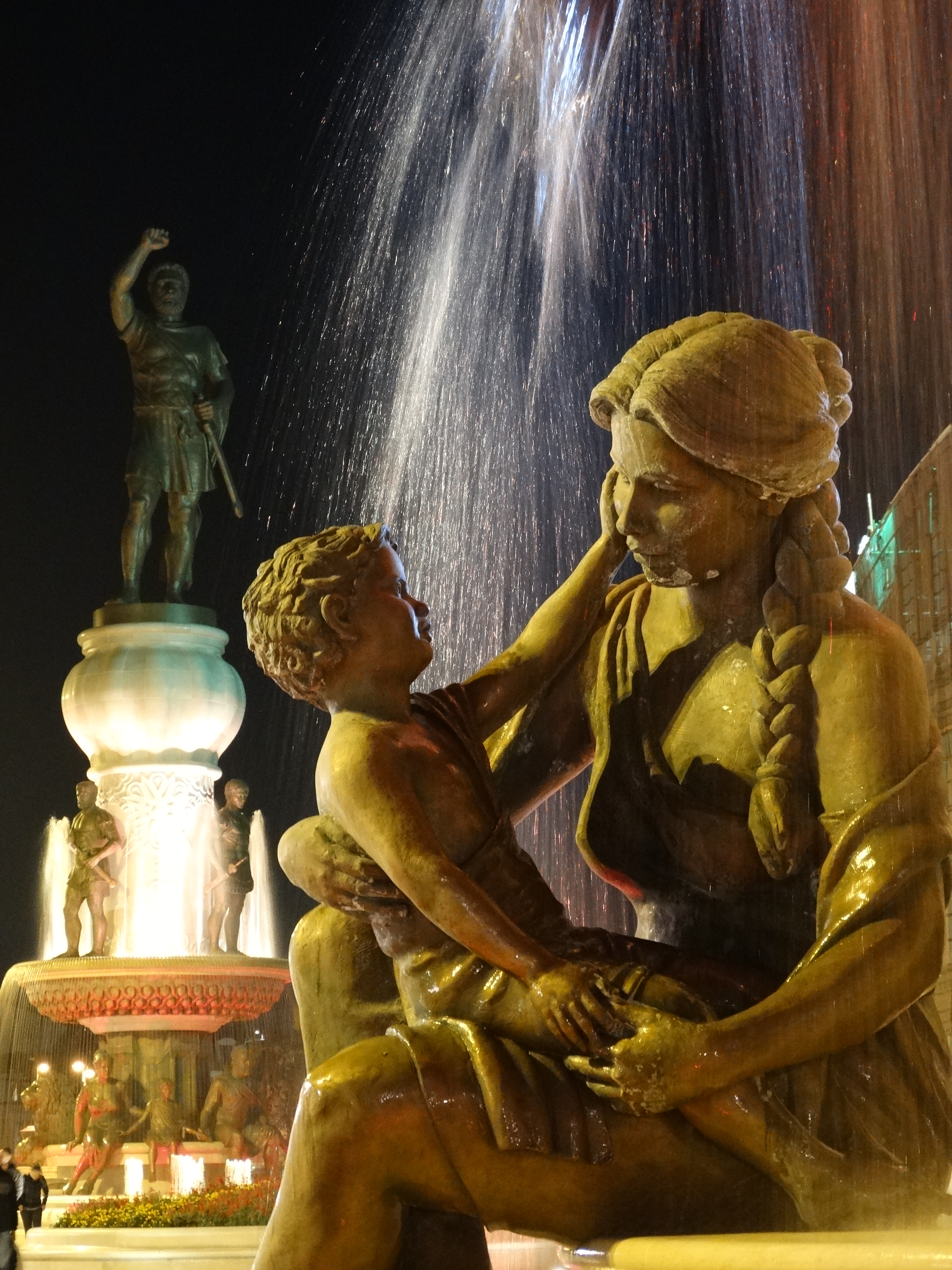
Macedonian Mothers Fountain (2012), Skopje

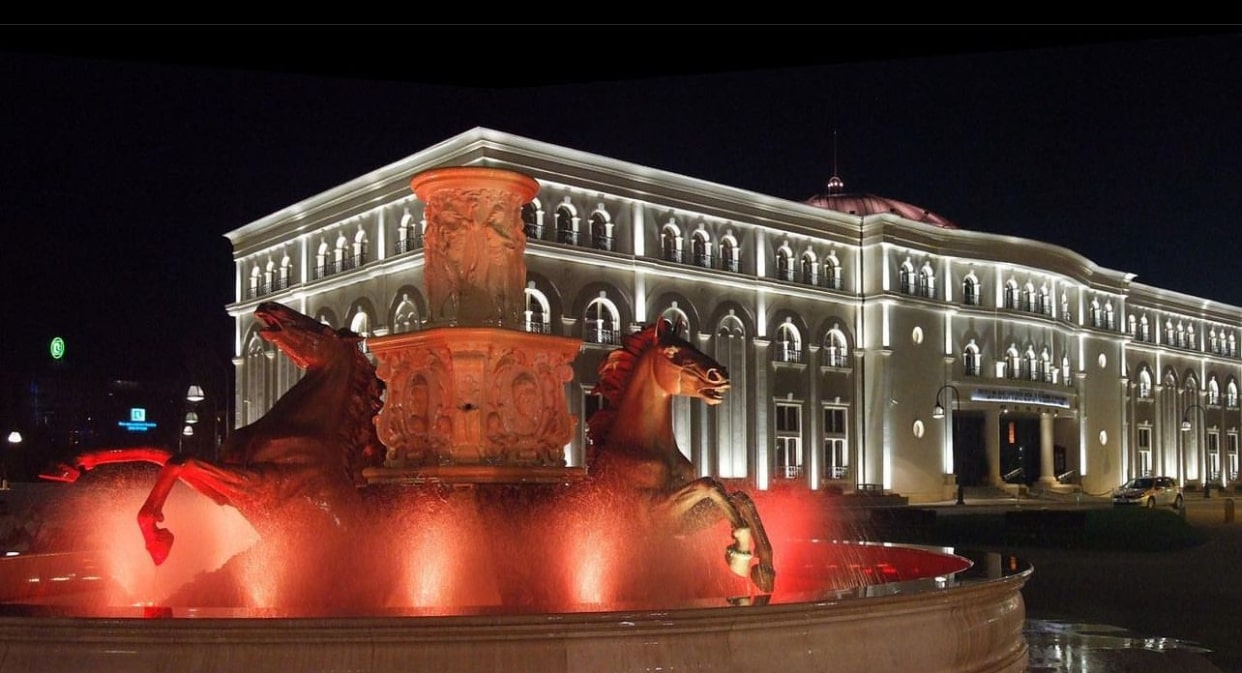
Flora Fountain (2012), Skopje

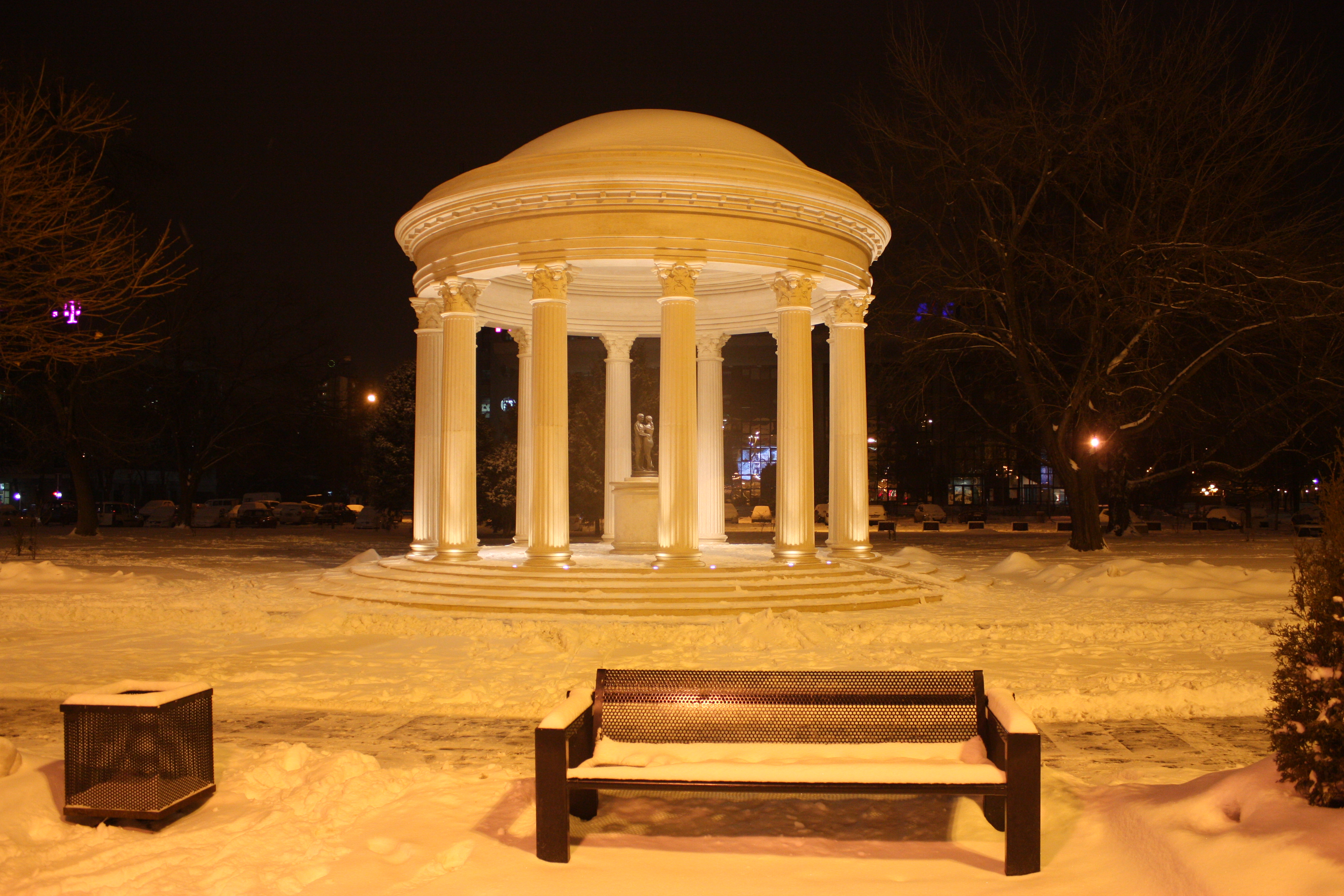
Monument "In Love", pavilion (2012), Skopje

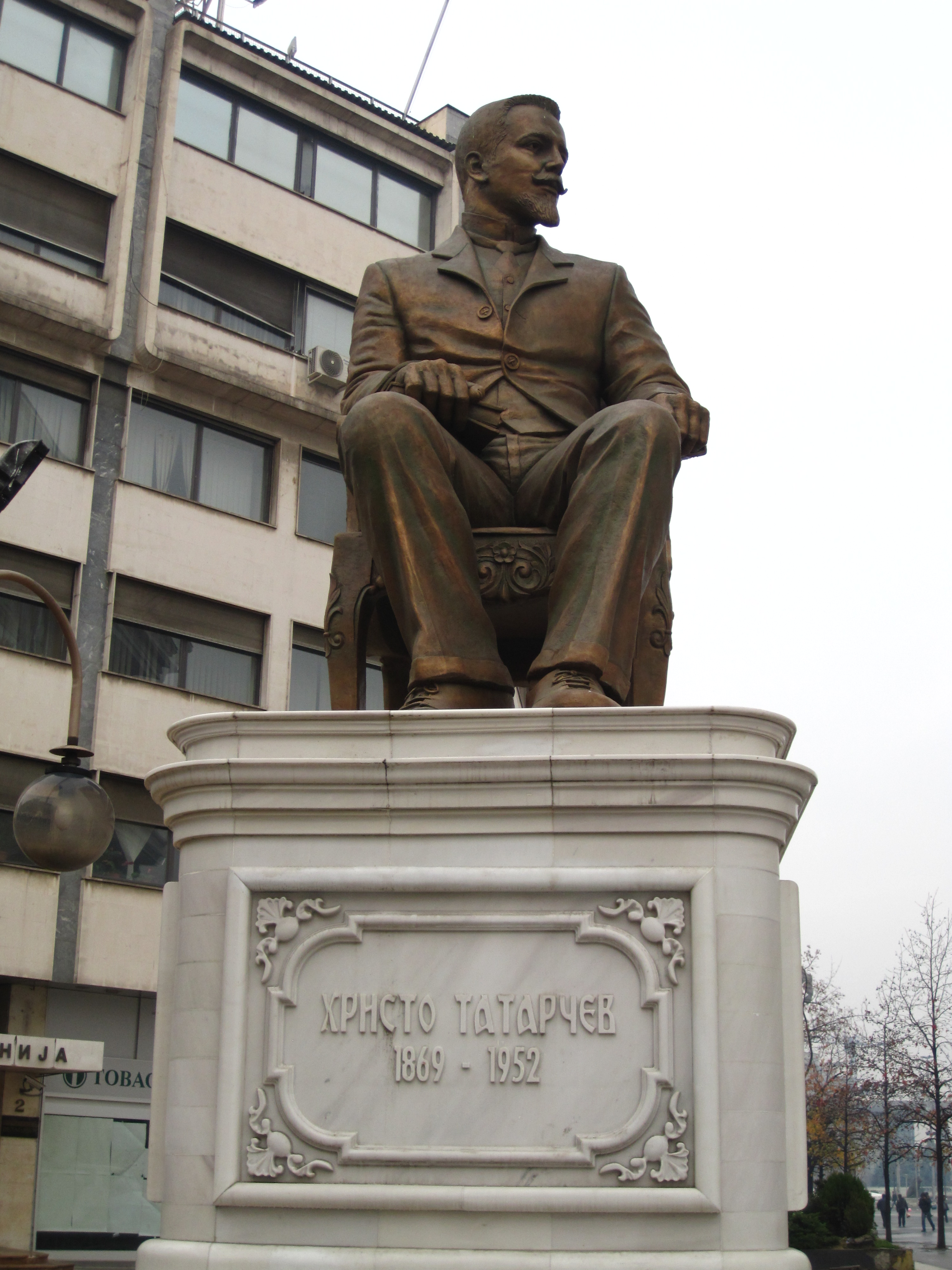
Hristo Tatarčev (2013), Skopje

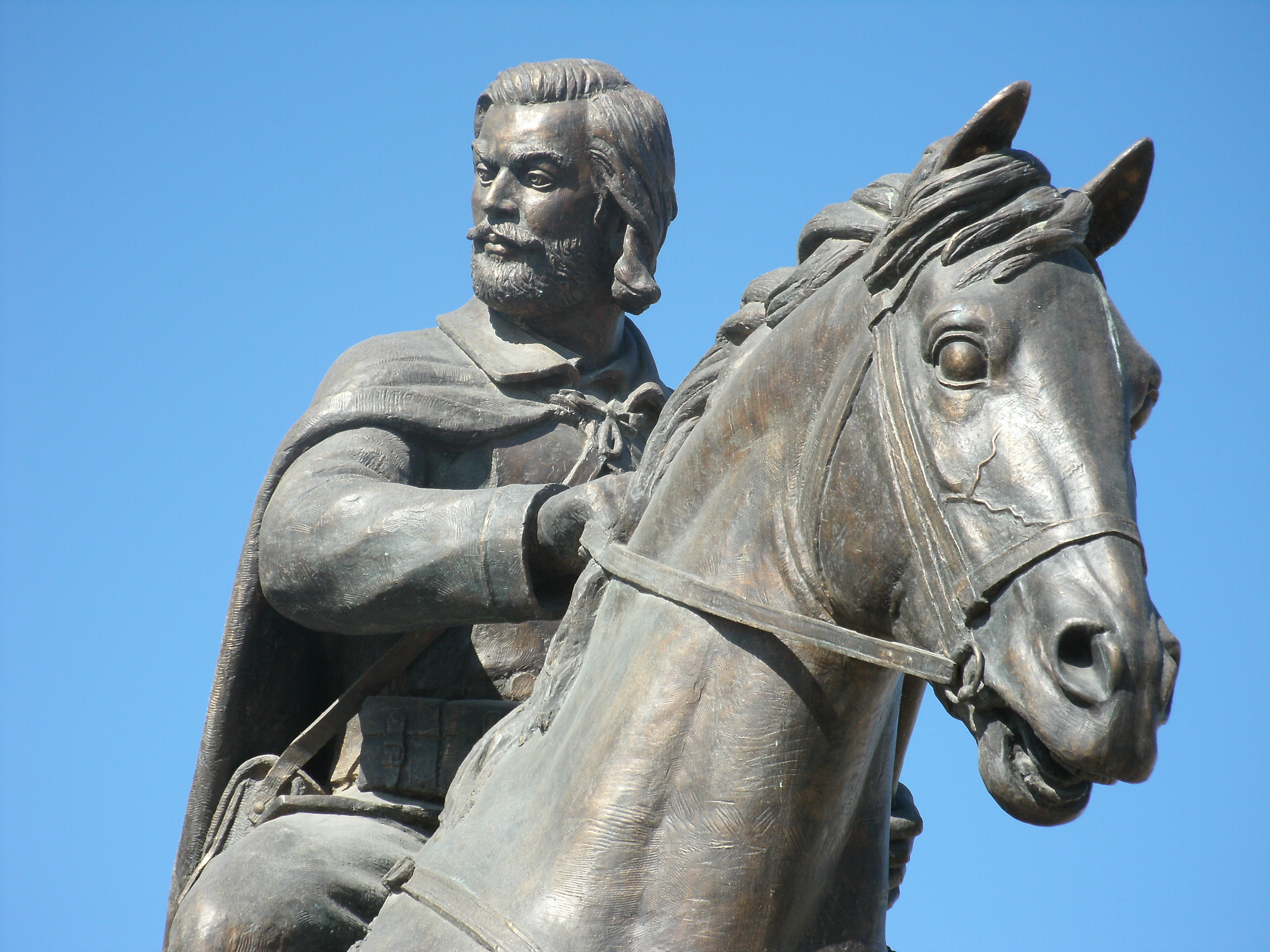
Boris Sarafov (2013), Skopje

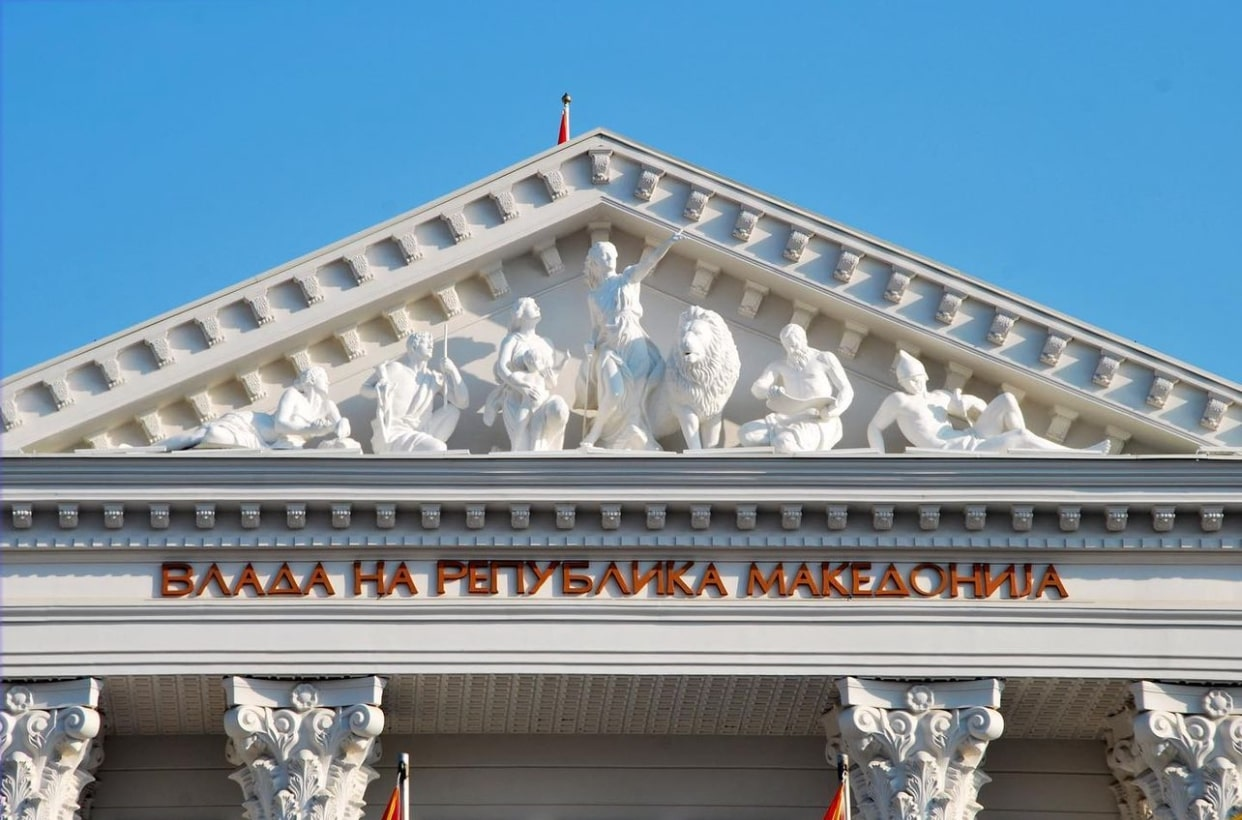
Sculptures on the Tympanon of the Government of Macedonia Building (2015), Skopje

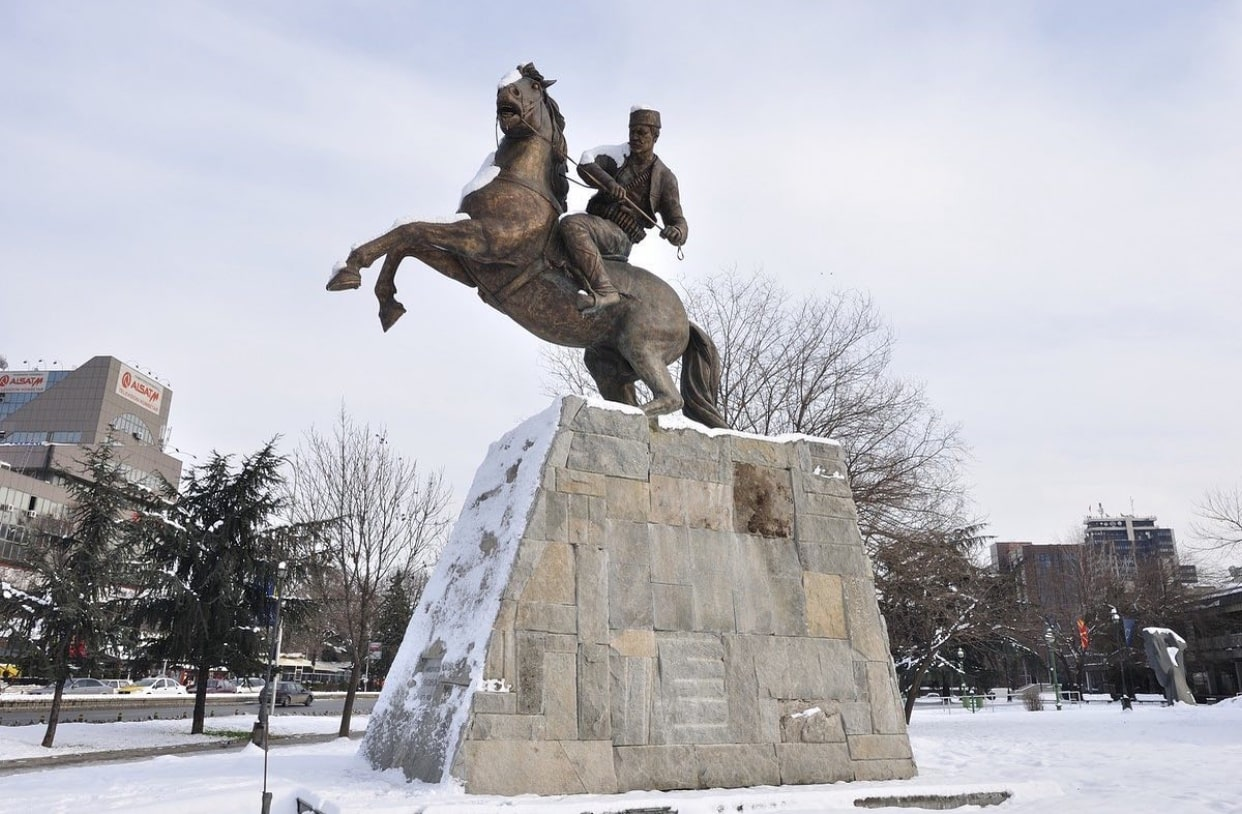
Nikola Petrov Rusinski (2014), Skopje

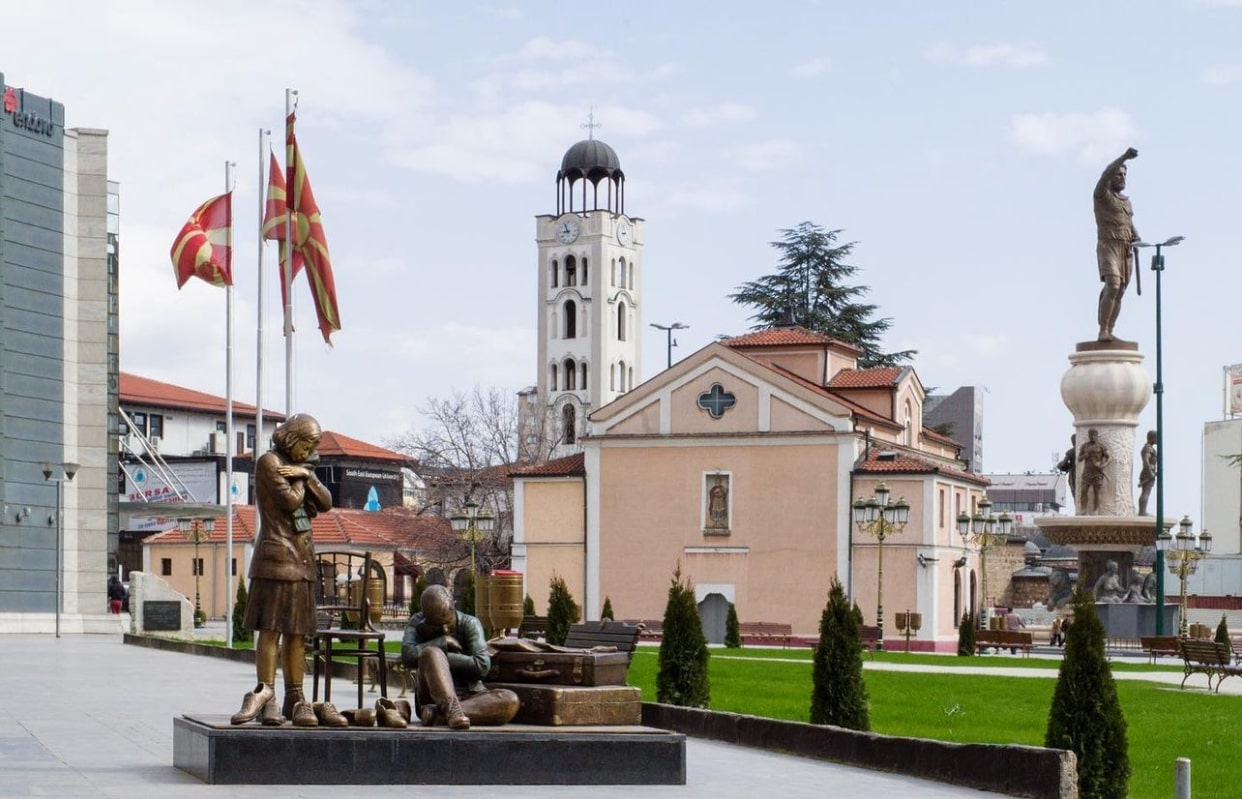
Monument of the Holocaust on the Jews in Macedonia (2015), Skopje

== Exhibitions ==
=== Solo exhibitions ===
- 2008 - 60th anniversary of the persecution of children refugees from Aegean Macedonia, Еxhibition room in "Boris Trajkovski", Skopje, Macedonia
- 2008 - Cultural Information Centre, Skopje, Macedonia
- 2015 - Cultural Information Centre, Skopje, Macedonia
- 2015 - Cultural Centre, Bihac, Bosnia & Herzegovina
- 2015 - Art Saloon, Veles, Macedonia
- 2015 - House of Culture, Delcevo, Macedonia
- 2015 - Gallery "Roman Petrovic", Sarajevo, Bosnia & Herzegovina
- 2015 - House of Culture, Kocani, Macedonia
- 2016 - Museum in Prijepolje, Prijepolje, Serbia
- 2016 - Gallery "Spirala", Priboj, Serbia
- 2016 - Gallery "Borko Lazeski", Prilep, Macedonia
- 2017 - Art Saloon, Veles, Macedonia
- 2017 - Gallery of the International University, Novi Pazar, Serbia
- 2018 - Exhibition "Balkan Artists", Edirne, Turkey
- 2019 - "Ausstellung", Keller Galerie Zurich, Zurich, Switzerland
- 2022 - Gallery "Preporod", Sarajevo, Bosnia & Herzegovina
- 2023 - Gallery "Home of Culture", Zenica, Bosnia & Herzegovina

=== Group exhibitions ===
- 2004 - My Message, Museum of the City of Skopje, Skopje, Macedonia
- 2004 - Association of FINE Artists of Macedonia, Museum of the City of Skopje, Skopje, Macedonia
- 2005 - Strictly Forbidden, Museum of the City of Skopje, Skopje, Macedonia
- 2006 - Association of FINE Artists of Macedonia, Museum of the City of Skopje, Skopje, Macedonia
- 2009 - Small Form, Cultural Information Centre, Skopje, Macedonia
- 2010 - Zagorichanski Meetings, Small Station, Skopje, Macedonia
- 2012 - The First Exhibition in Arch Macedonia within the "White Night" Event, Skopje, Macedonia
- 2012 - The First Summit "Macedonia 2025", Ohrid, Macedonia
- 2013 - DLUM Experimental Drawing, Skopje, Macedonia
- 2013 - DLUM Miniatura, Skopje, Macedonia
- 2014 - International Exhibition "Bridge", Cultural Information Centre, Skopje, Macedonia
- 2014 - Art Gallery, Veles, Macedonia
- 2014 - House of Culture, Kavadarci, Macedonia
- 2014 - House of Culture, Negotino, Macedonia
- 2015 - Annual Exhibition, Association of FINE Artists of Macedonia, Small Station, Skopje, Macedonia
- 2015 - Exhibition for the children of the center "DUGA", Bihac, Bosnia & Herzegovina
- 2017 - Turkish-Macedonian exhibition "Artistic Expressions", Bitola Museum, Bitola, Macedonia
- 2017 - Das Labyrinth der Freiheit, H. ART / DAVOS / Labyrinth of Freedom, Davos, Switzerland
- 2018 - Complex of Sultan Bayezid II Health Museum, Trakya University, Edirne, Turkey
- 2018 - Fine Arts Faculty, Trakya University, Edirne, Turkey
- 2018 - Pomnik Monument "Europa Srodkowo – Wschodnia 1918-2018", National Museum in Warsaw, Poland
- 2018 - VIII International Ceramic Symposium, Kocaeli Province, Turkey
- 2021 - Gallery MC, New York City, USA
- 2023 - International Art Colony Pocitelj, Mostar, Bosnia & Herzegovina
