= Porta Macedonia =

Memorial arch in Skopje, North Macedonia

Coordinates: 41°59′40″N 21°25′56″E

- Порта Македонија
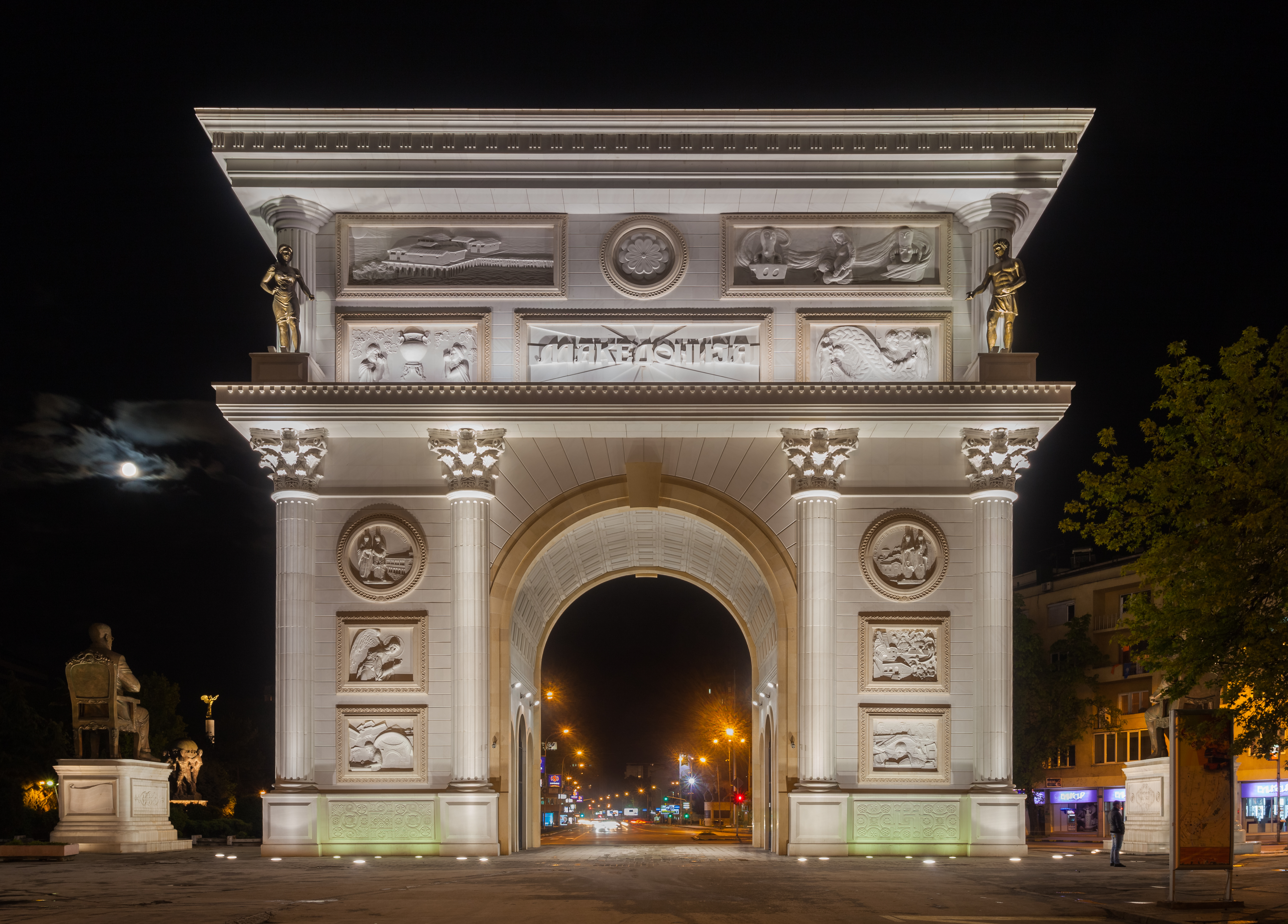
- Alternative names: Triumphal Arch (Триумфална капија, Триумфална порта)

General information
- Type: Memorial arch
- Location: Pela Square (Плоштад Пела), Skopje, North Macedonia
- Opened: 6 January 2012
- Cost: EUR 4.4 million
- Client: Government of North Macedonia

Height
- Height: 21 m (69 ft)

Design and construction
- Architect: Valentina Stevanovska
- Main contractor: Granit

Porta Macedonia (Macedonian: Порта Македонија) is a memorial arch located on Pella Square in Skopje, North Macedonia. Construction started in 2011 and was completed in January 2012.

The arch is 21 meters in height, and cost EUR 4.4 million. Its author is Valentina Stevanovska, a sculptor who made several other controversial monuments from the Skopje 2014 project, including the statue dedicated to Alexander the Great officially named "Warrior on Horseback." During the opening ceremony, the Prime Minister Nikola Gruevski admitted that he personally is the instigator of the Skopje 2014 plan.

The arch is dedicated to 20 years of Macedonian independence and its outer surface is covered in 193 m^{2} of reliefs carved in marble, depicting scenes from the history of North Macedonia. It also contains interior rooms, one of which has a function of state-owned souvenir shop, as well as elevators and stairs providing public access to the roof, allegedly intended as space for weddings.

The arch faced criticism for its high cost. It is designed to match the almost equally tall statue of "Alexander the Great", erected in the capital's central square in summer 2011. Both constructions were part of the government-funded project named "Skopje 2014" with an estimated unofficial price tag €500 million. The Greek Foreign Ministry lodged an official complaint in 2012 to authorities in the Republic of Macedonia following the inauguration of the arch which features images of historical figures including Alexander the Great.
