= Warrior on Horseback =

Monument in Skopje, North Macedonia

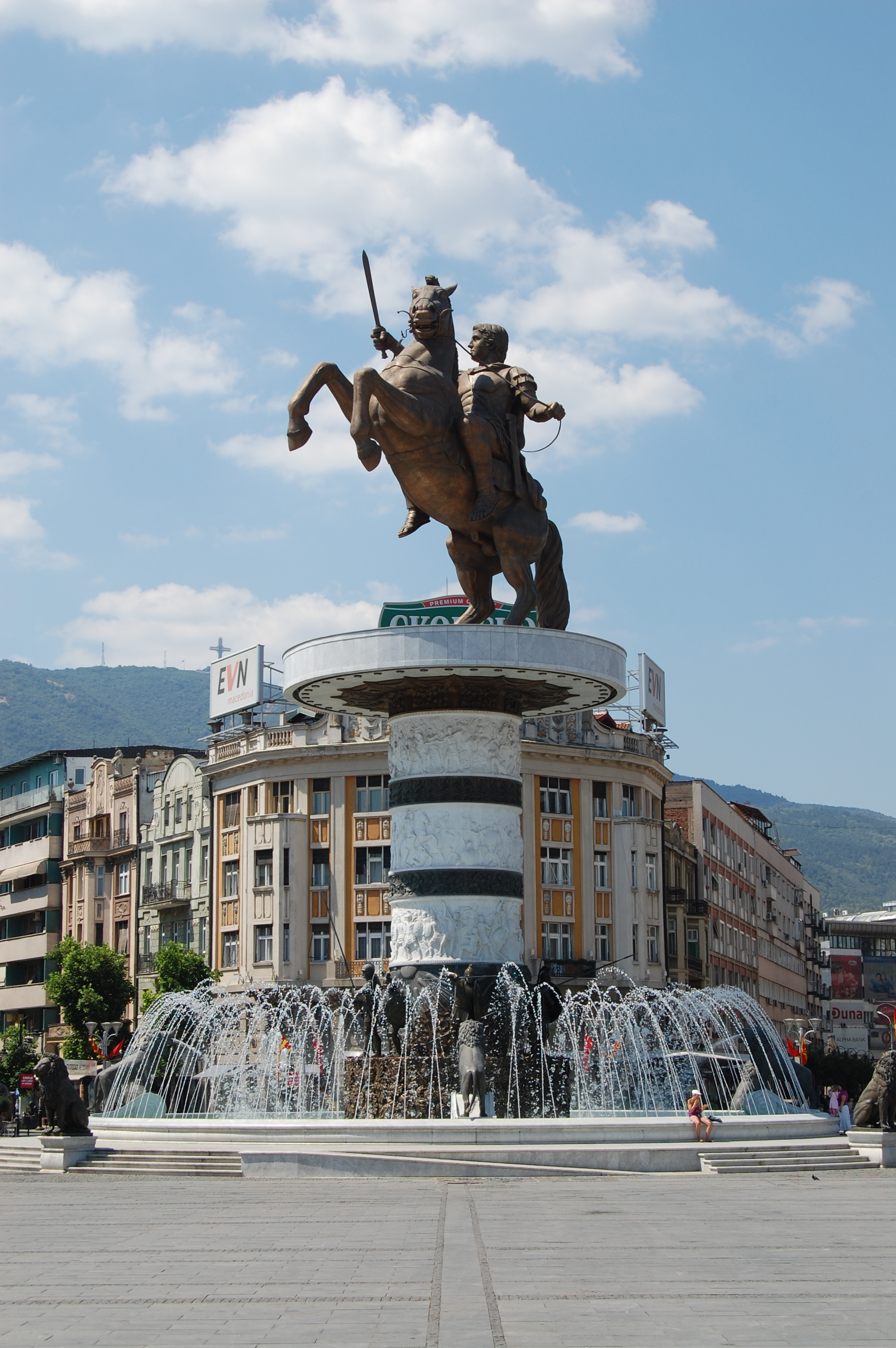

Warrior on Horseback (Macedonian: Воин на коњ), also translated as Warrior on a Horse, is a monument in Macedonia Square in Skopje, the capital of North Macedonia. The monument consists of a 12-metre bronze statue, on top of a 10-metre pedestal including a fountain. The monument was installed as part of the Skopje 2014 infrastructure project. It was sculpted by Valentina Stevanovska.

Antonio Milošoski, then the foreign minister, told The Guardian in October 2010 that the statue depicted Alexander the Great and was an "up yours" to Greece, due to the two nations' disputes over the identity of the ancient Macedonians. In 2011, the government of Prime Minister Nikola Gruevski began to refer to the statue as of a generic warrior. The statue was cast by the Ferdinando Marinelli Artistic Foundry in Florence in Italy, and the cost of the entire monument was estimated by the BBC as being €5.3 million, and the San Diego Union-Tribune as €9.4 million. The statue was inaugurated on 8 September 2011 to mark 20 years since the 1991 Macedonian independence referendum.

Professor Blaže Ristovski praised the monument as part of nation-building, while critics decried populism, nationalism, antiquization and a waste of money during a period of economic hardship.

The Prespa Agreement in 2018 settled several issues in Greece–North Macedonia relations, including the Macedonia naming dispute. Per this agreement, a plaque was put by the monument to say that Alexander belonged to Hellenic civilisation.
