= Macedonia Square, Skopje =

Square in Skopje, North Macedonia

Macedonia Square
- Public square
- Плоштад Македонија
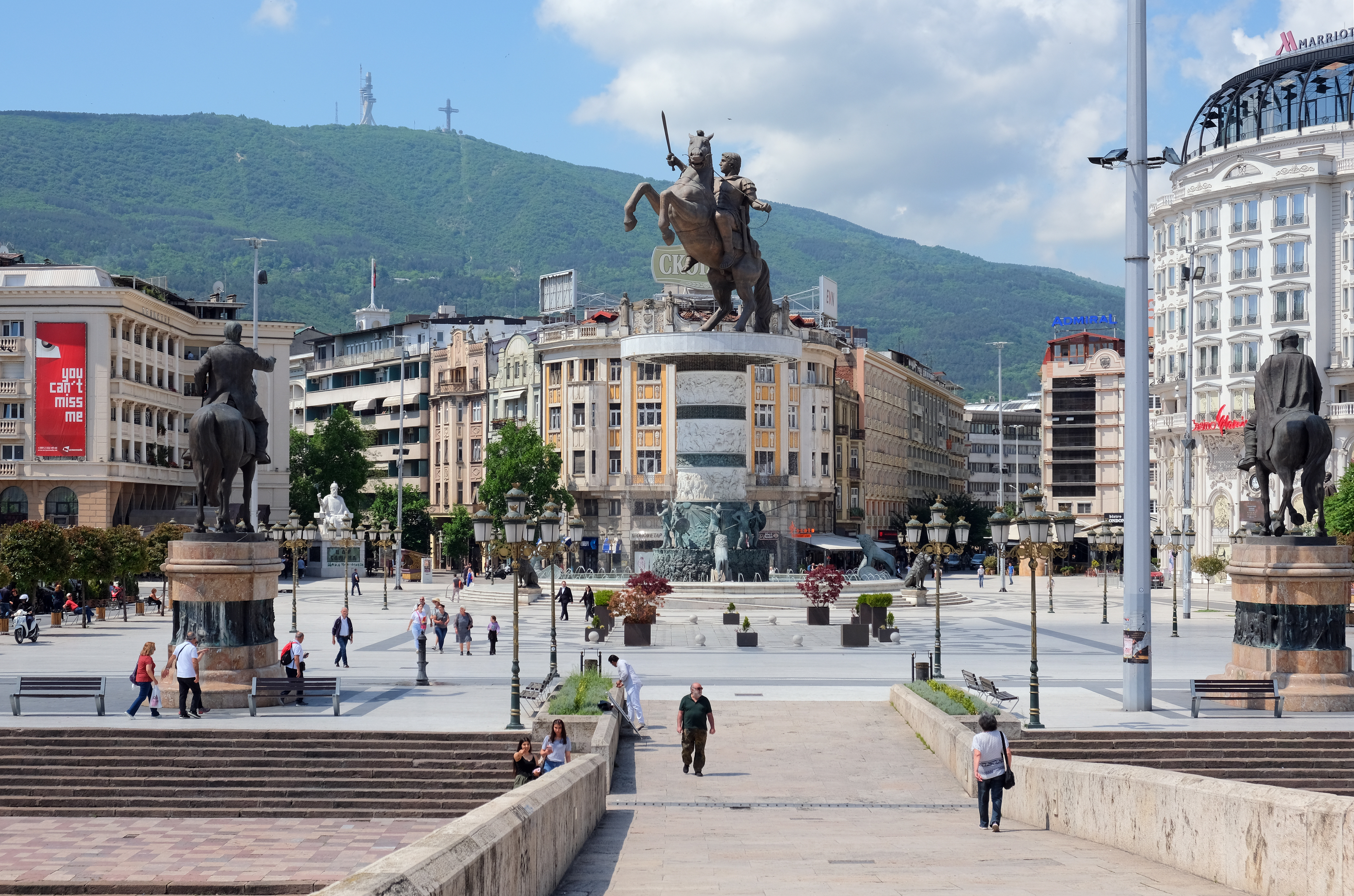
- Macedonia Square from the Stone Bridge
- Owner: Skopje
- Interactive map of Macedonia Square
- Coordinates: 41°59′46″N 21°25′54″E

Macedonia Square (Macedonian: Плоштад Македонија, Ploštad Makedonija;) is the main square of Skopje, the capital of North Macedonia. The square is the biggest in North Macedonia with a total extent of 18,500 m^{2}. It is located in the central part of the city, and it crosses the Vardar River. The Christmas festivals are always held there and it commonly serves as the site of cultural, political and other events. The independence from Yugoslavia was declared here by the first president of Macedonia, Kiro Gligorov. The square is part of the Skopje 2014 project.

== History ==
In 2007, the Macedonian government announced plans to reconstruct the Officers' Hall, which together with the Old Theatre (also being reconstructed on the other side of Macedonia Square, across the Vardar River) that was severely destroyed in the 1963 Skopje earthquake.

In December 2008, a flagpole with the Macedonian flag was erected on Macedonia Square, near the Stone Bridge, as it was done on 68 other important locations throughout the country.

On 2 May 2010, two monuments of Goce Delčev and Dame Gruev were erected near the Stone Bridge. The Centar Municipality built a high monument of a Warrior on Horseback and fountain which was unveiled on 8 September 2011, on the 20-year anniversary of Macedonia's independence referendum from Yugoslavia.

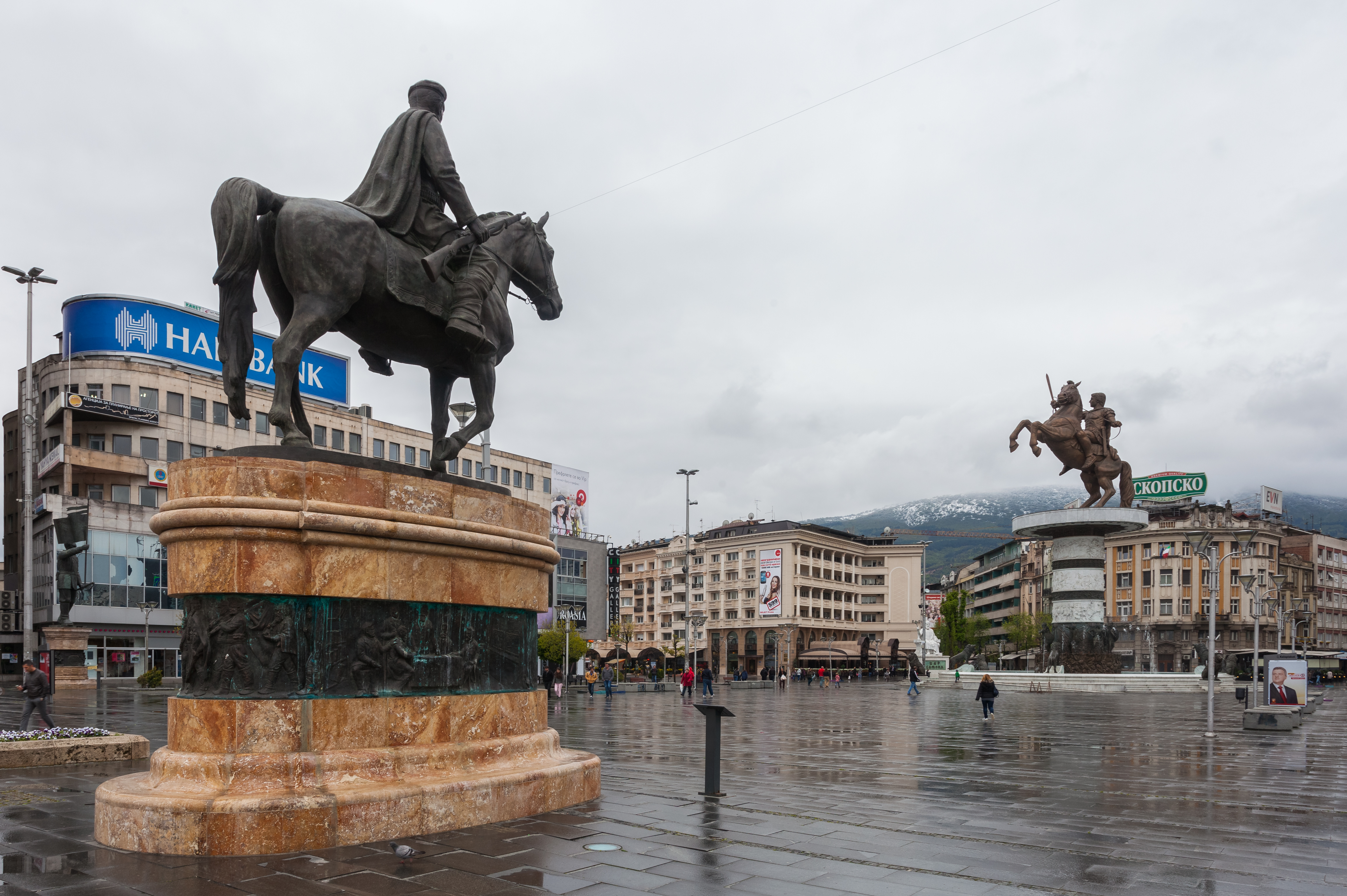
Different view of the square

The three main streets that merge onto the square are Maksim Gorki, Dimitar Vlahov and Street Macedonia. Dimitar Vlahov Street was converted into a pedestrian street in 2011. Maksim Gorki, while not a pedestrian zone, is lined with Japanese Cherry trees, whose blossoms in spring mark a week-long series of Asian cultural events. Finally, Macedonia Street, the main pedestrian street, connects Macedonia Square to the Old Railway Station (destroyed by the 1963 earthquake), which houses the City of Skopje Museum. Along Macedonia Street is the Mother Teresa Memorial House, which features an exhibit of artefacts from Mother Teresa's life. Mother Teresa's original family home was located near Macedonia Square, and a plaque marking the location can be found today. A feudal tower from the Middle Ages next to the Mother Teresa House still stands today, surprisingly withstanding the devastating 1963 earthquake. The most popular tourist walk starts from the Old Railway Station down Macedonia Street, past the Mother Teresa Memorial House and Feudal Tower, past Mother Teresa's birth house location, down Macedonia Square, across the Stone Bridge, past the Holocaust Museum, Museum of Macedonian Independence, towards the Turkish Bazaar and ending at the Kale Fortress. The reconstructed Old Theater and the new Archaeological Museum add additional cultural landmarks along the main tourist vertical.

In May 2010, Marriott Hotels announced the construction of the first Marriott Hotel in the Balkans in Skopje on Macedonia Square.

== Gallery ==
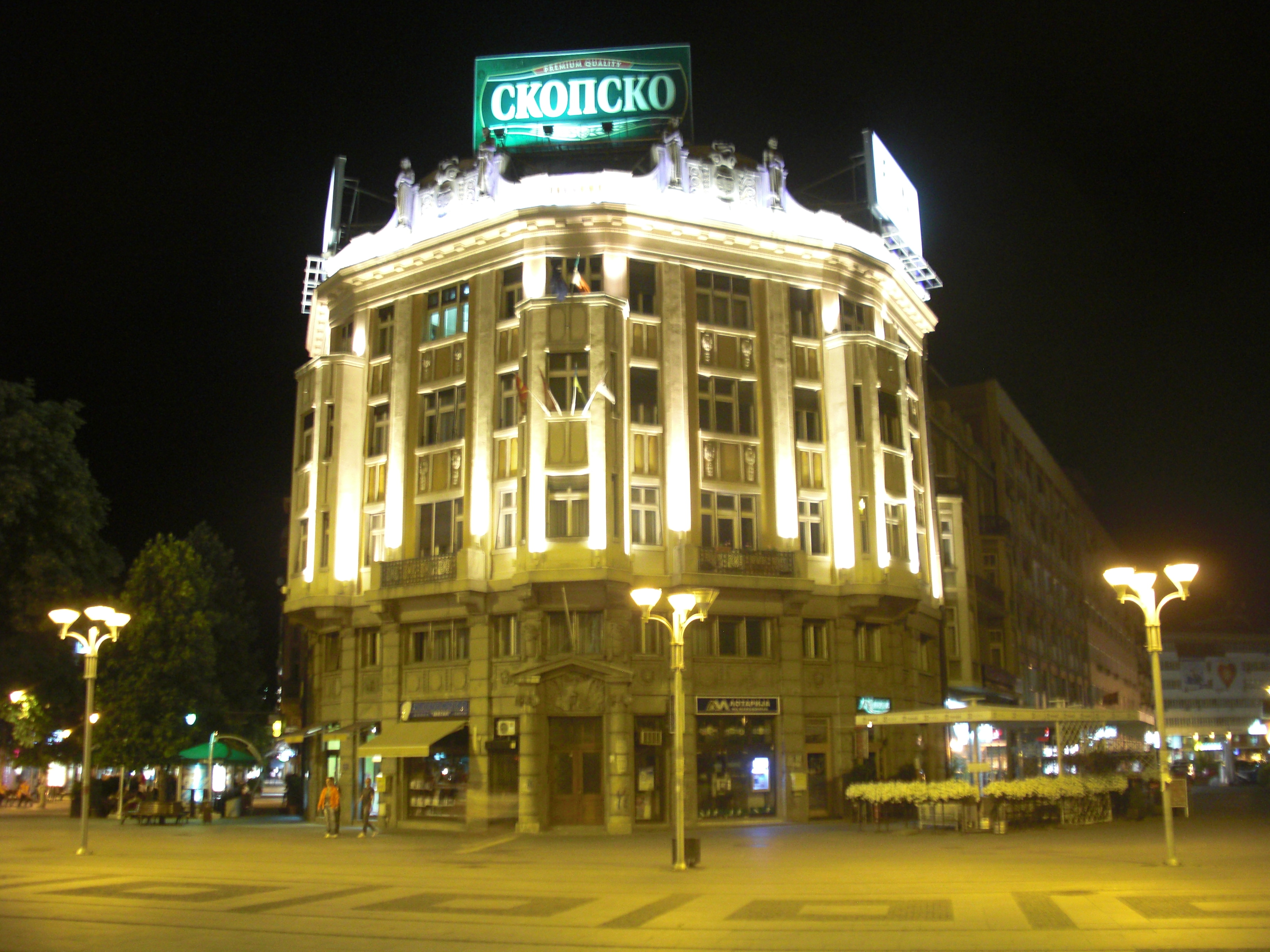
Ristiḱ Palace

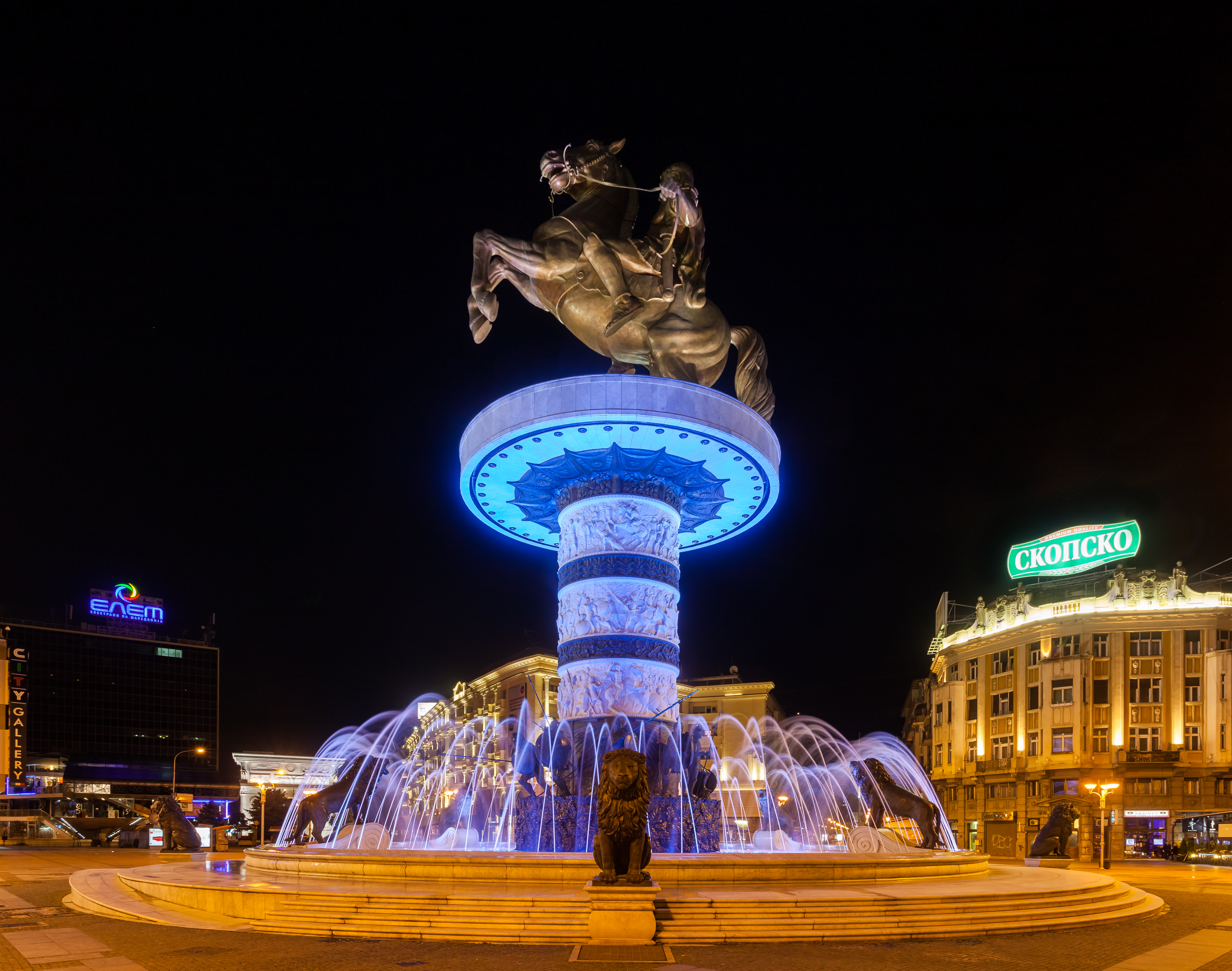
Warrior on Horseback statue by night

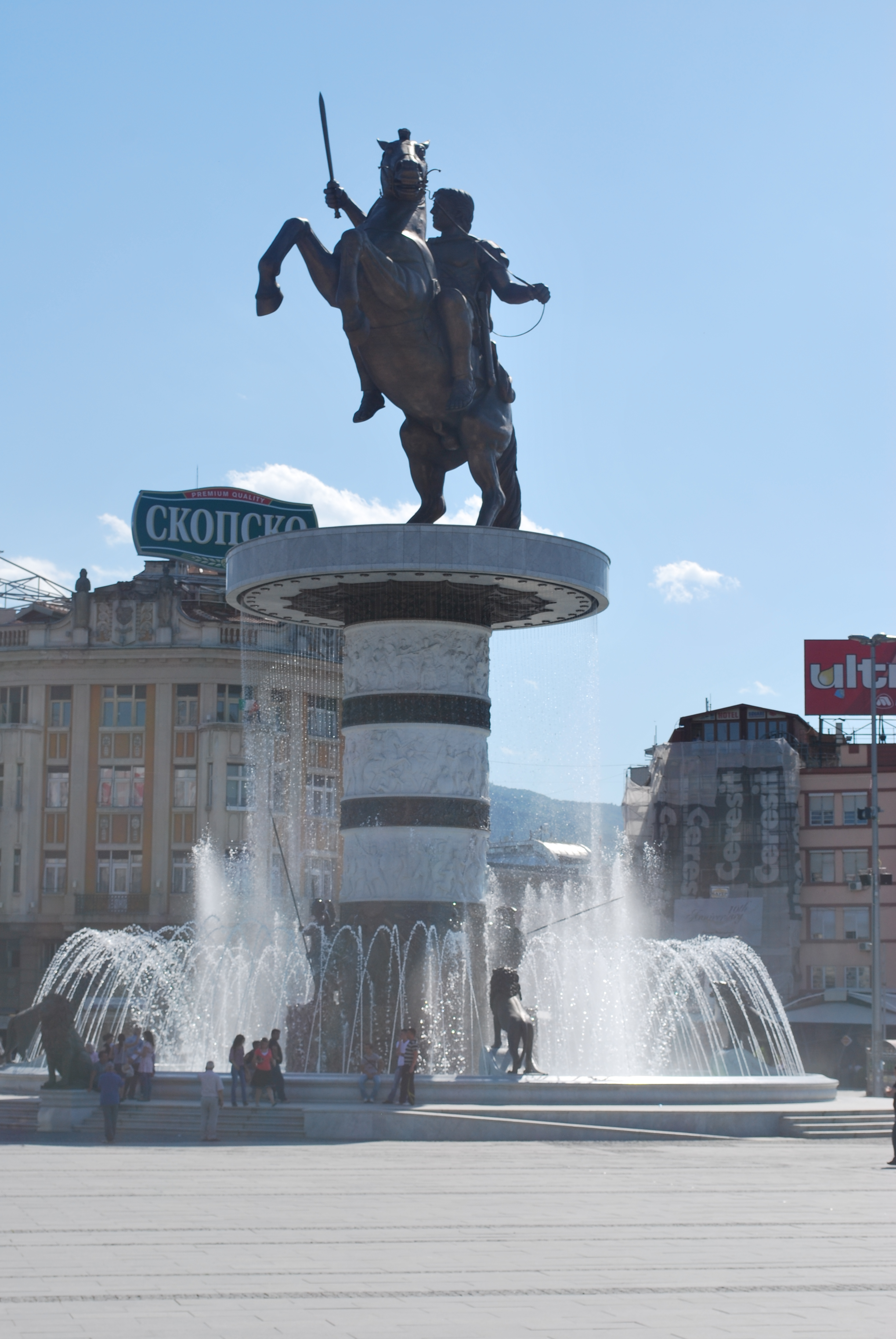
Warrior on Horseback by day

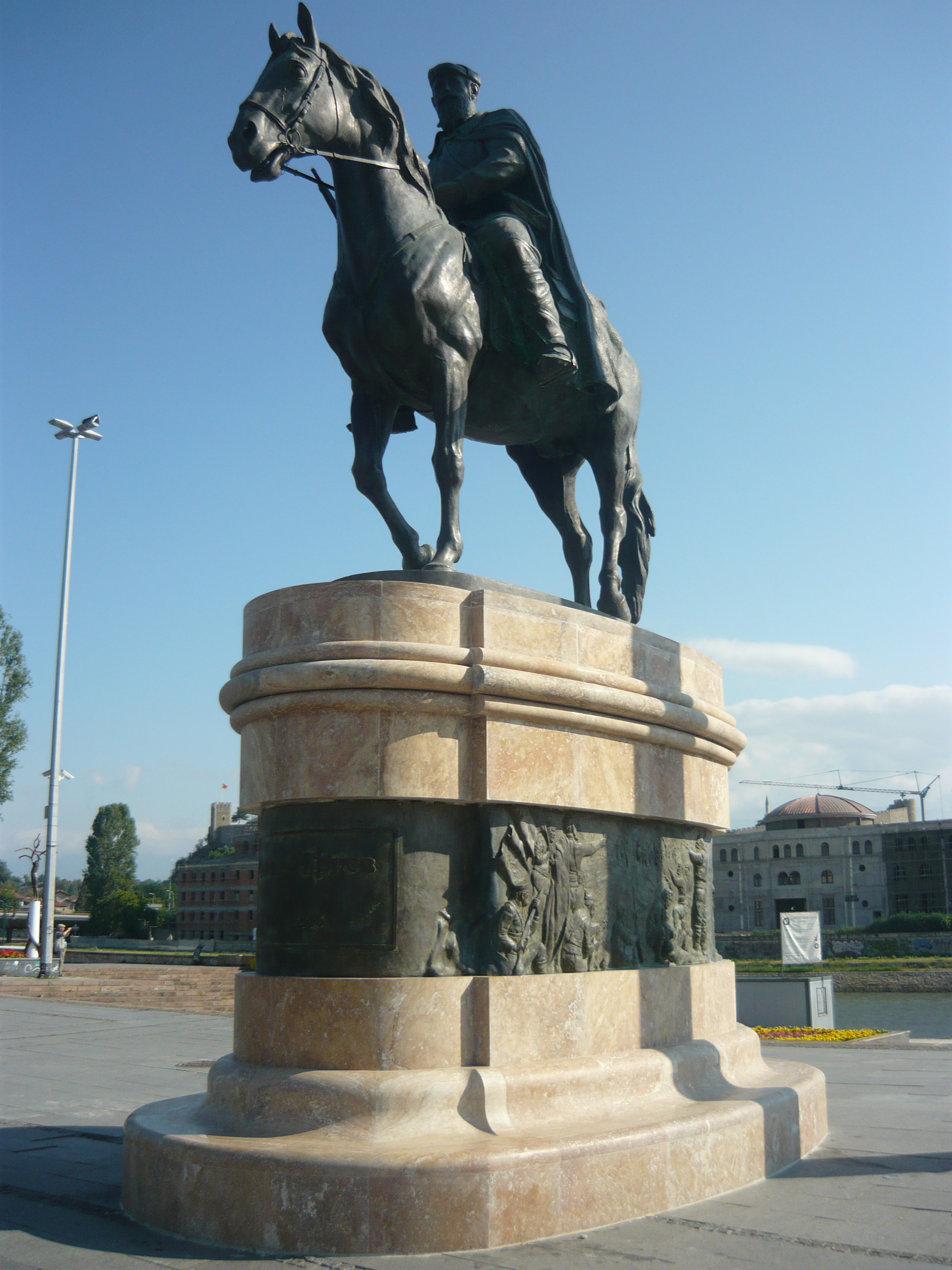
Dame Gruev statue

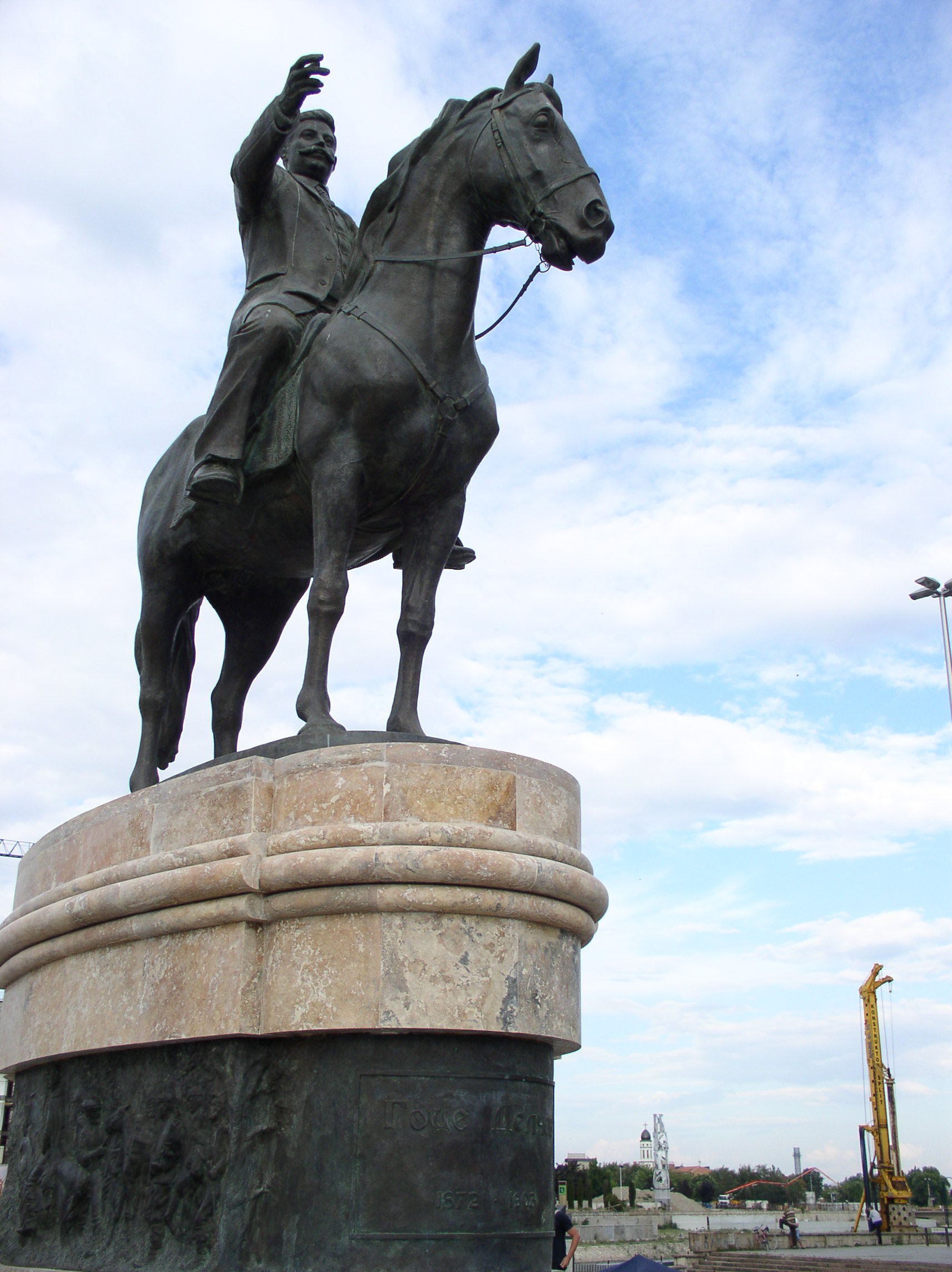
Goce Delčev statue

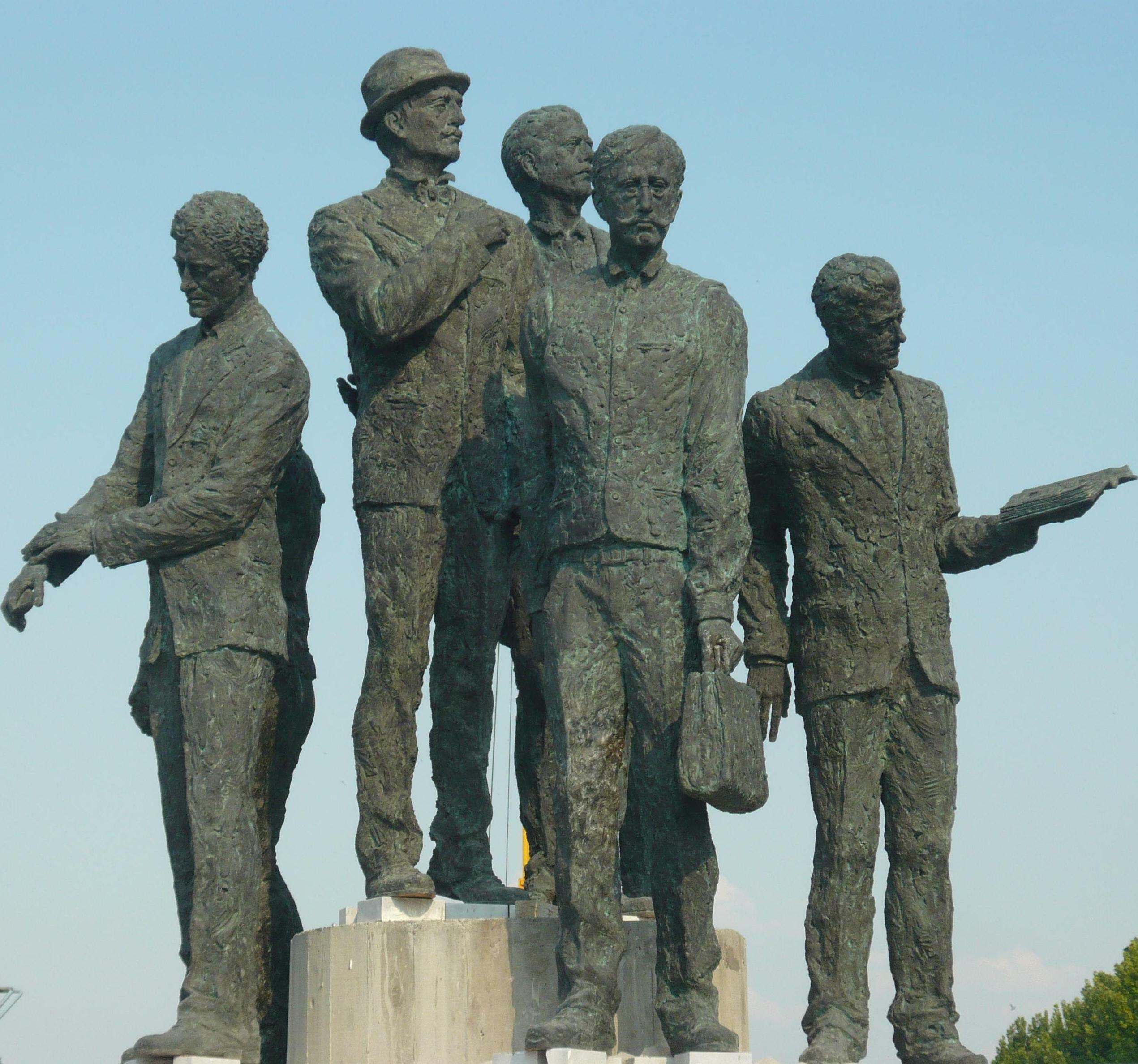
Boatmen of Thessaloníki monument

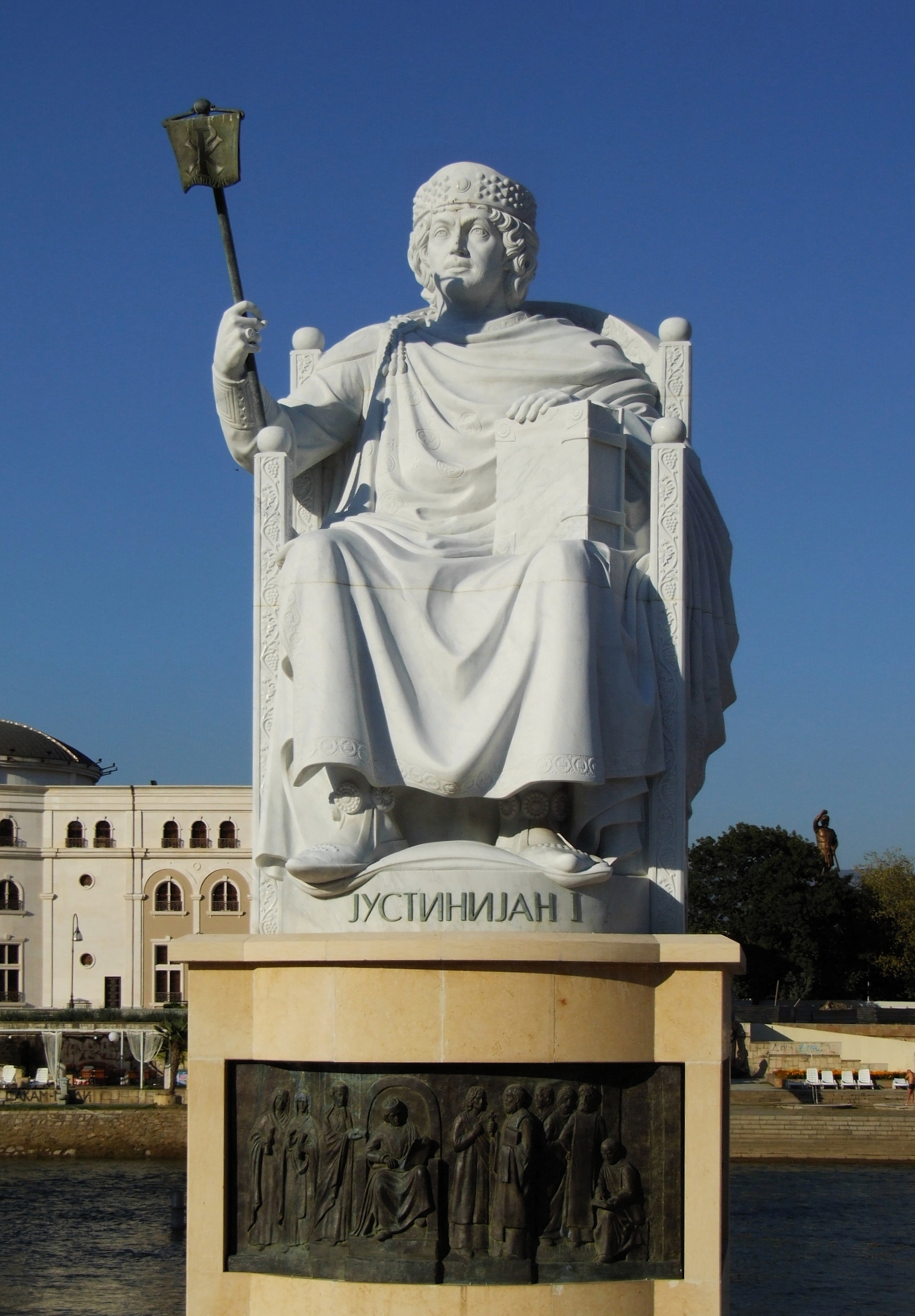
Justinian I statue

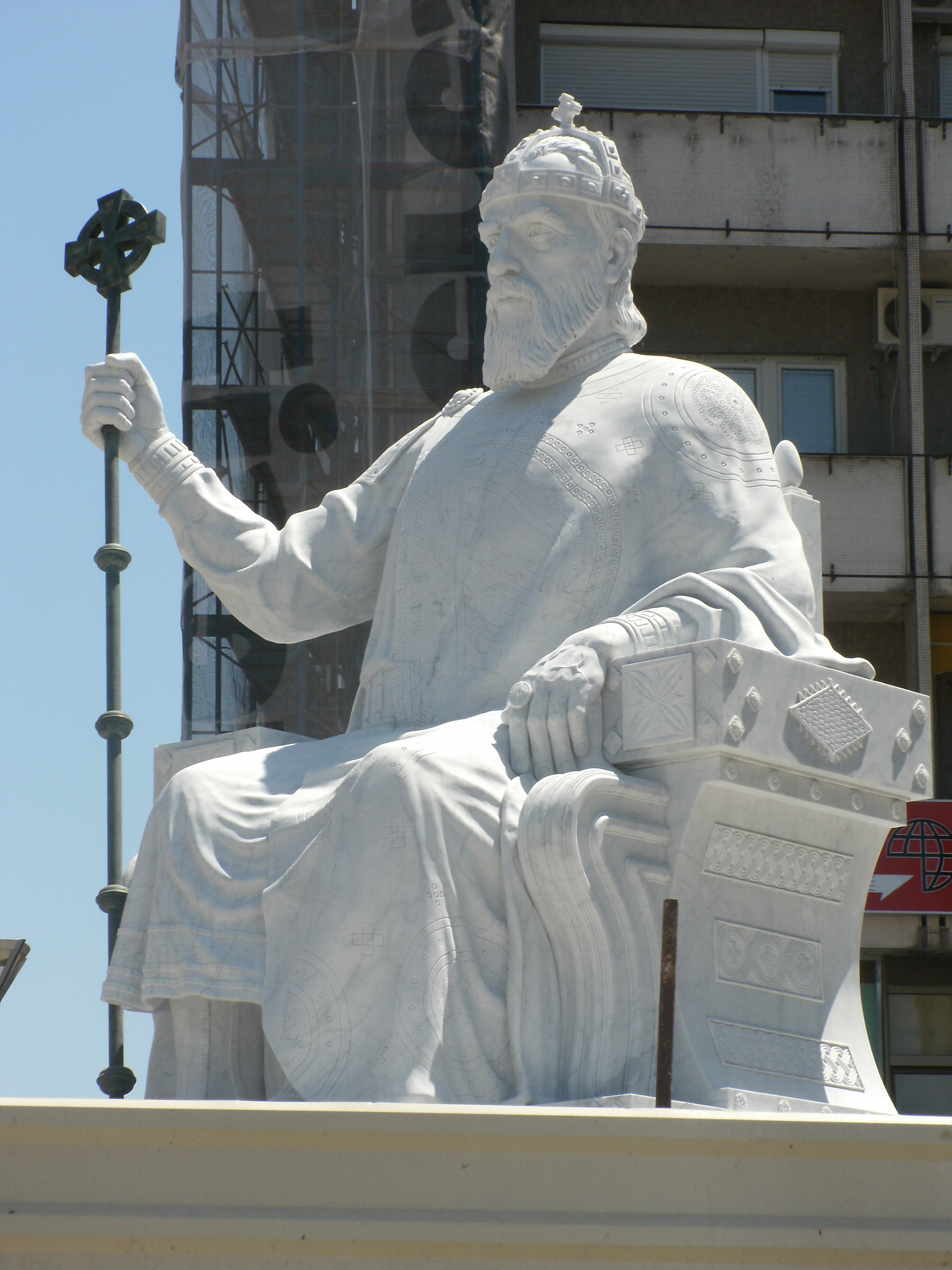
Samuil statue

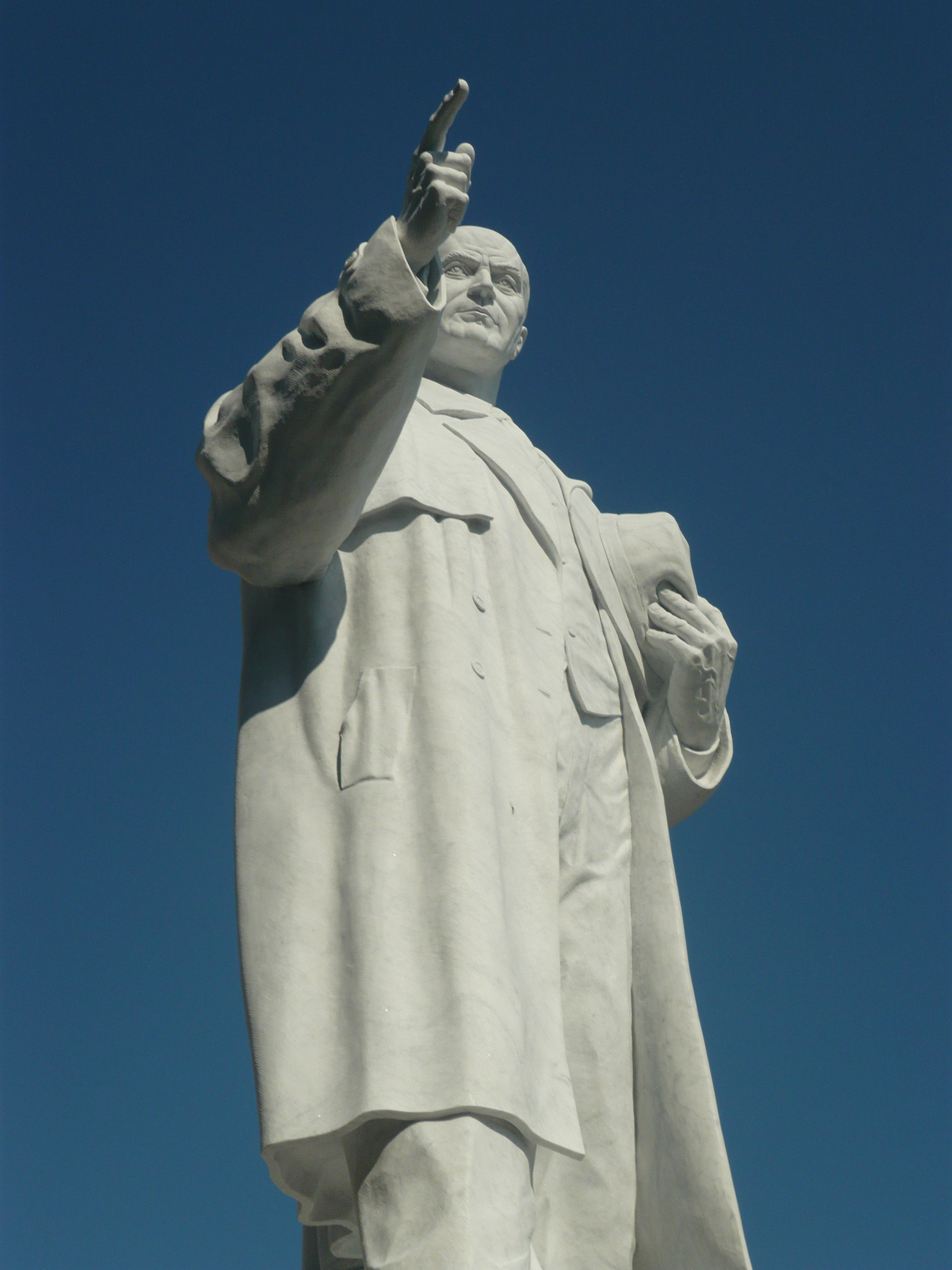
Metodija Andonov-Čento statue

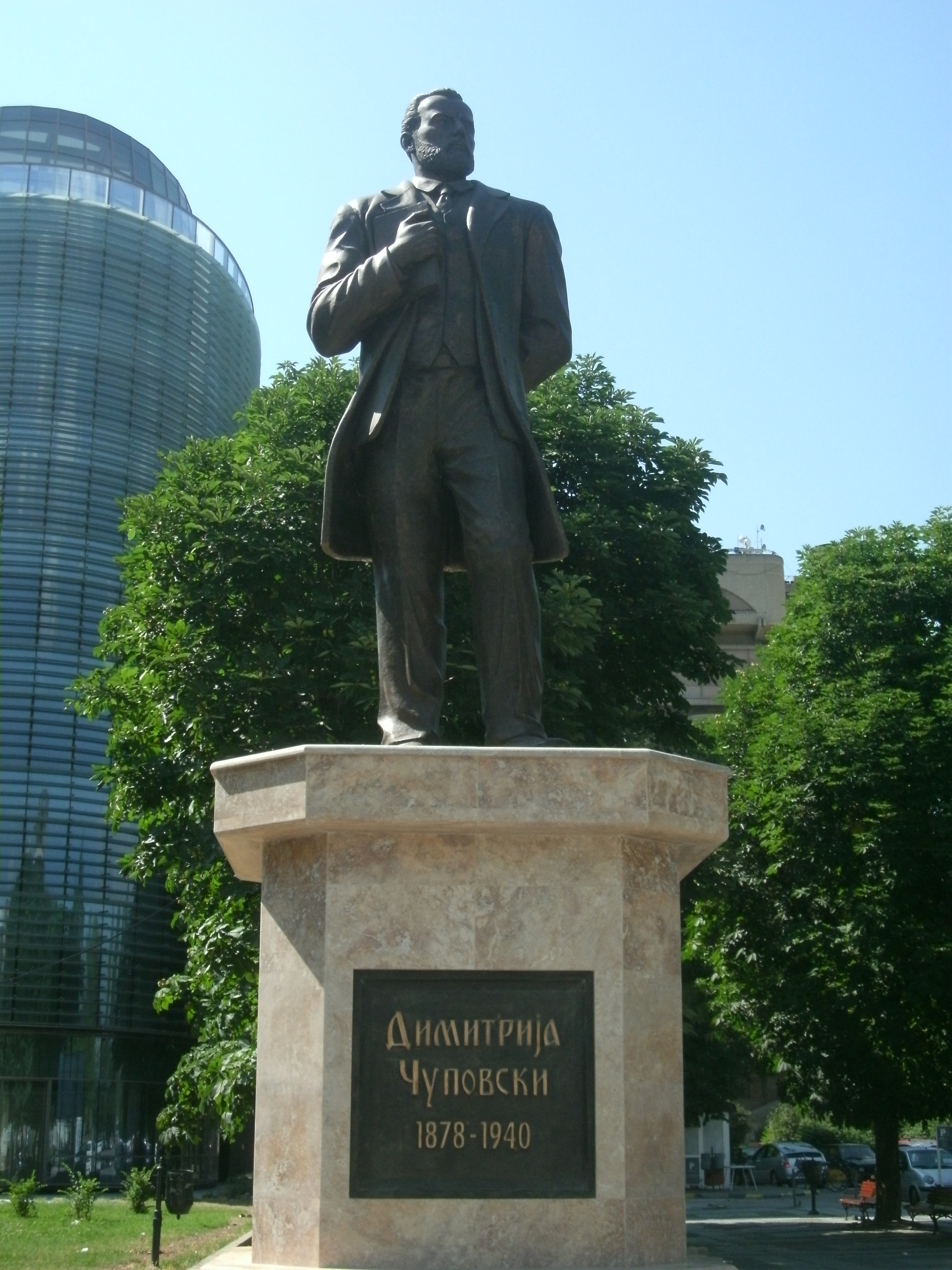
Dimitrija Čupovski statue

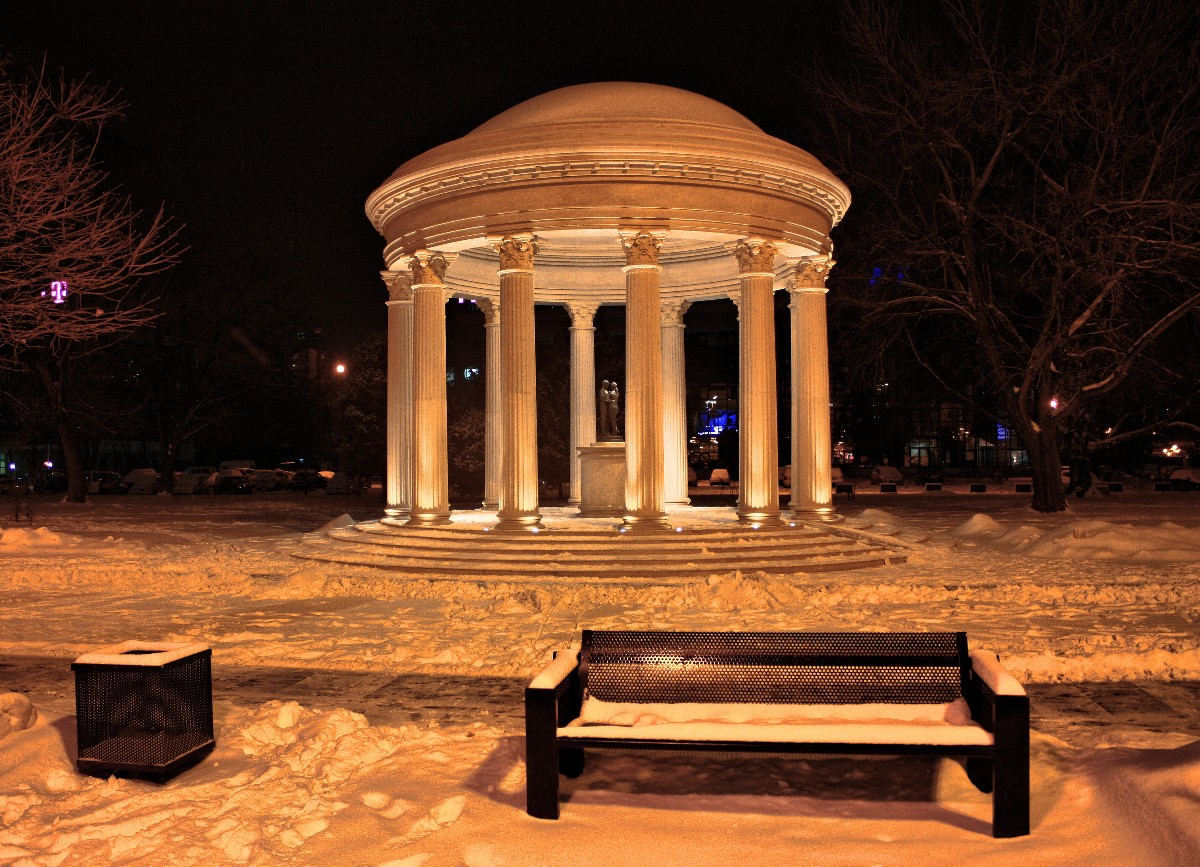
The Pavilion

== Historical sights ==
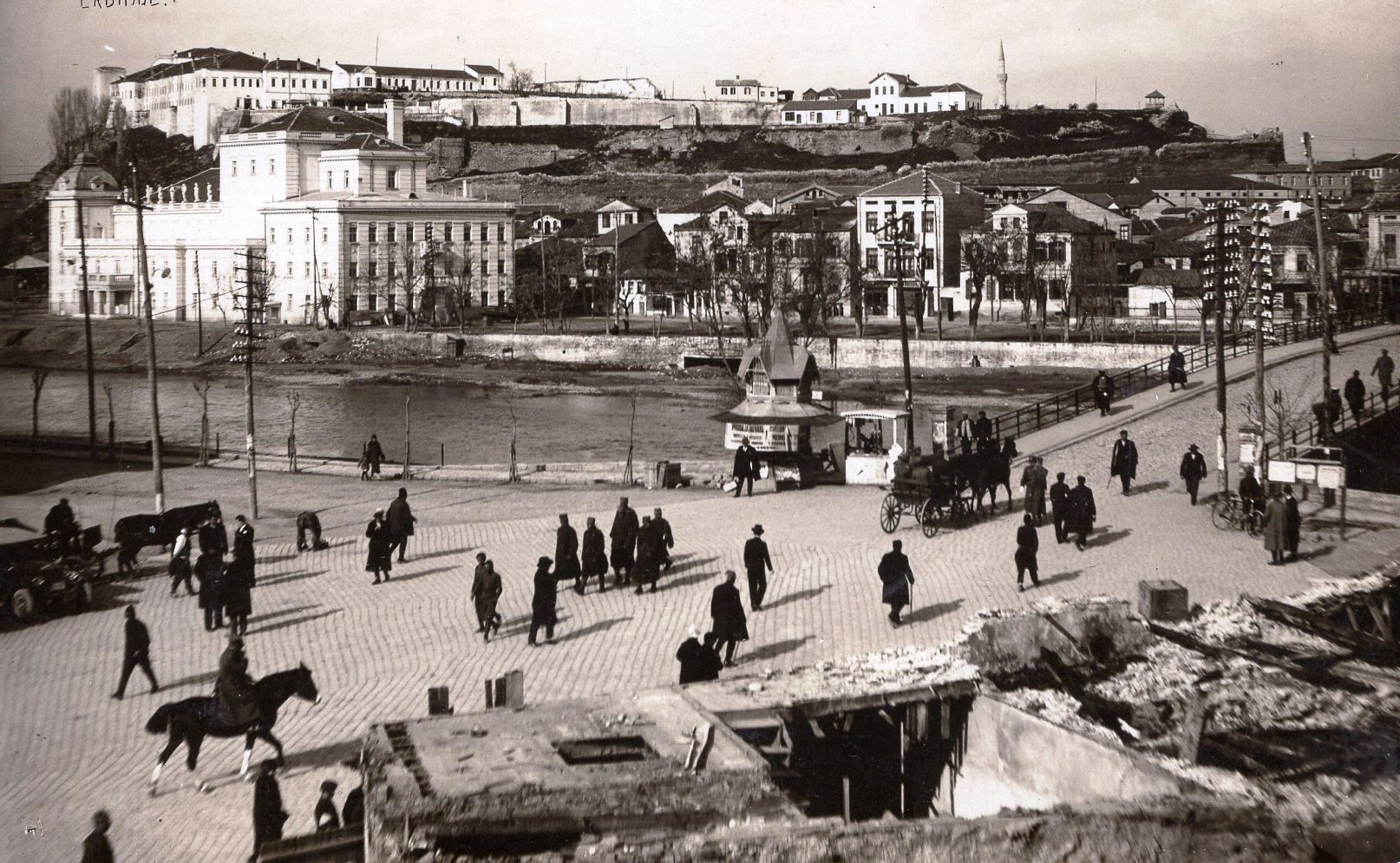
The square in the 1920s

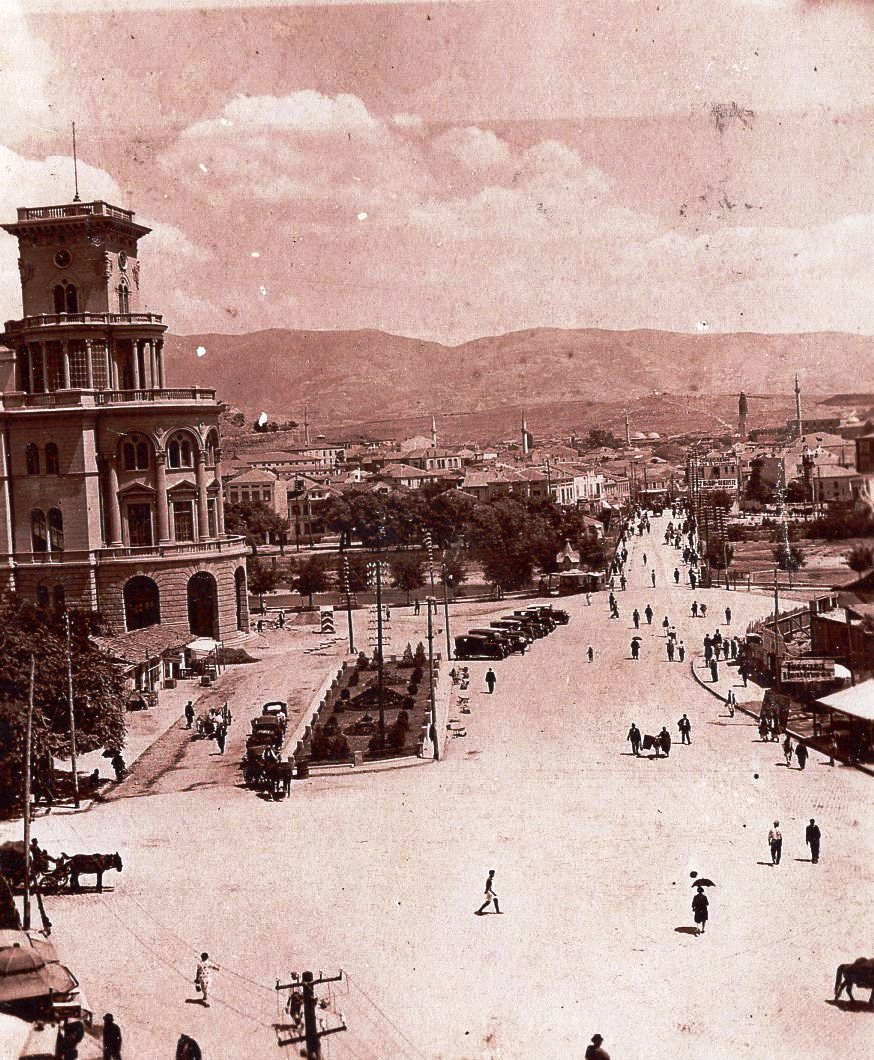
View in 1929 with the newly build Officers' Hall building on the left

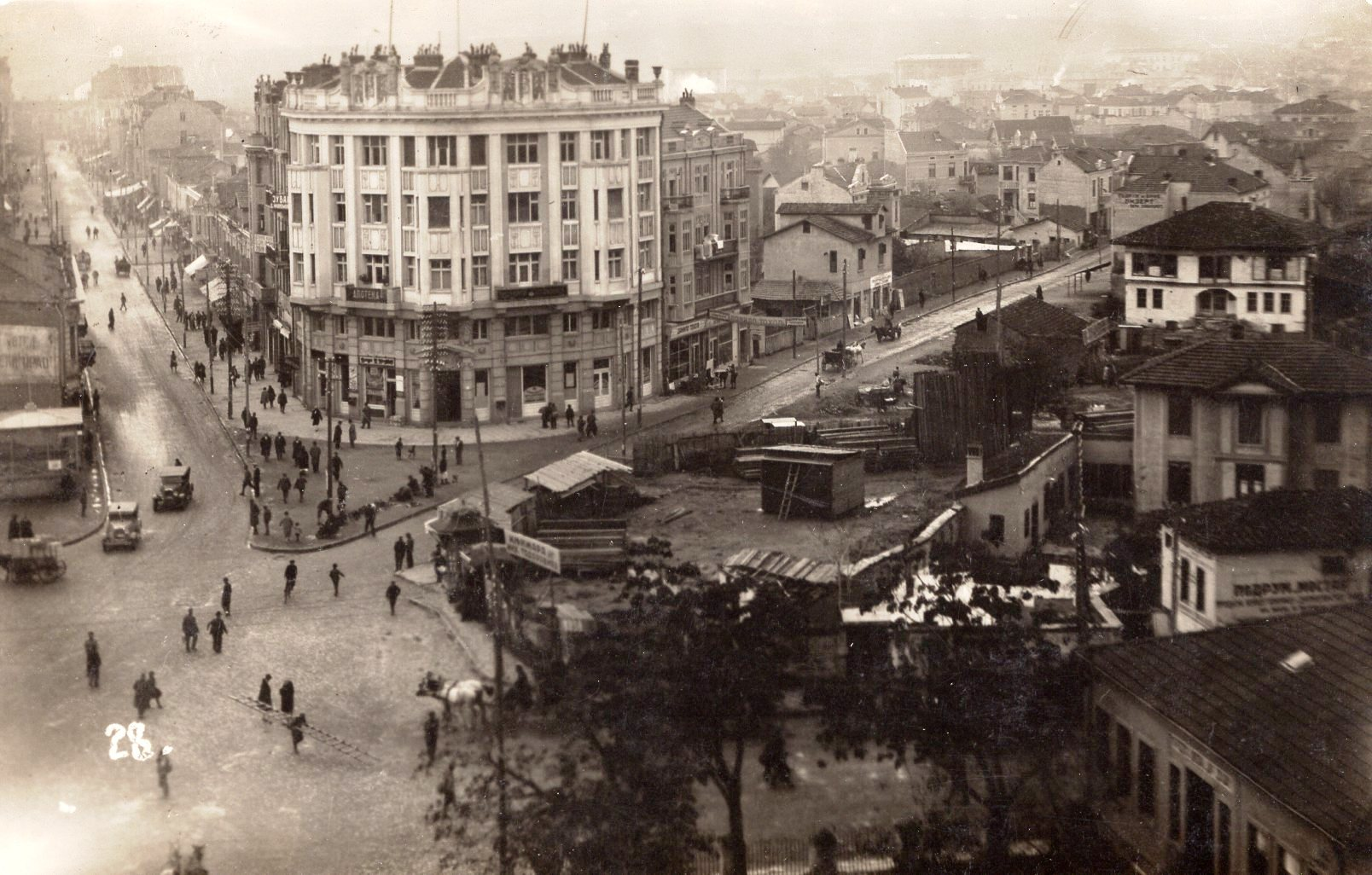
View of the Ristić Palace in 1930

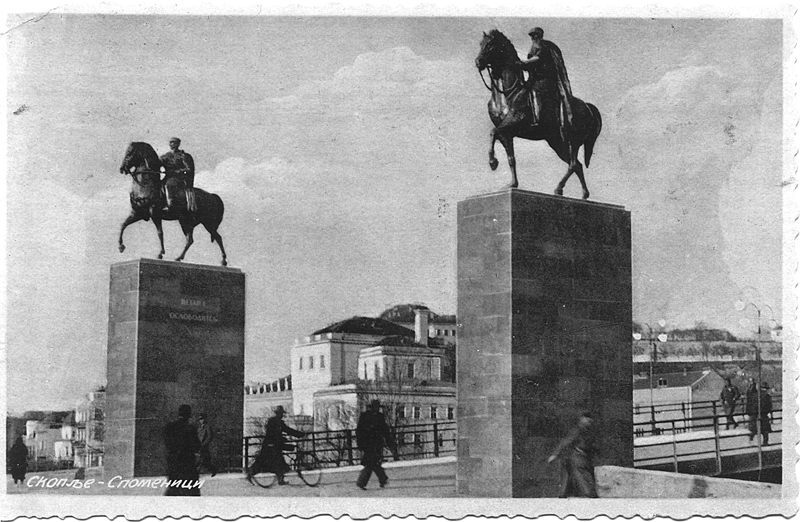
Former statues on the square before 1941: on the left, King Peter I of Serbia (the inscription is: King Peter I, The Liberator)

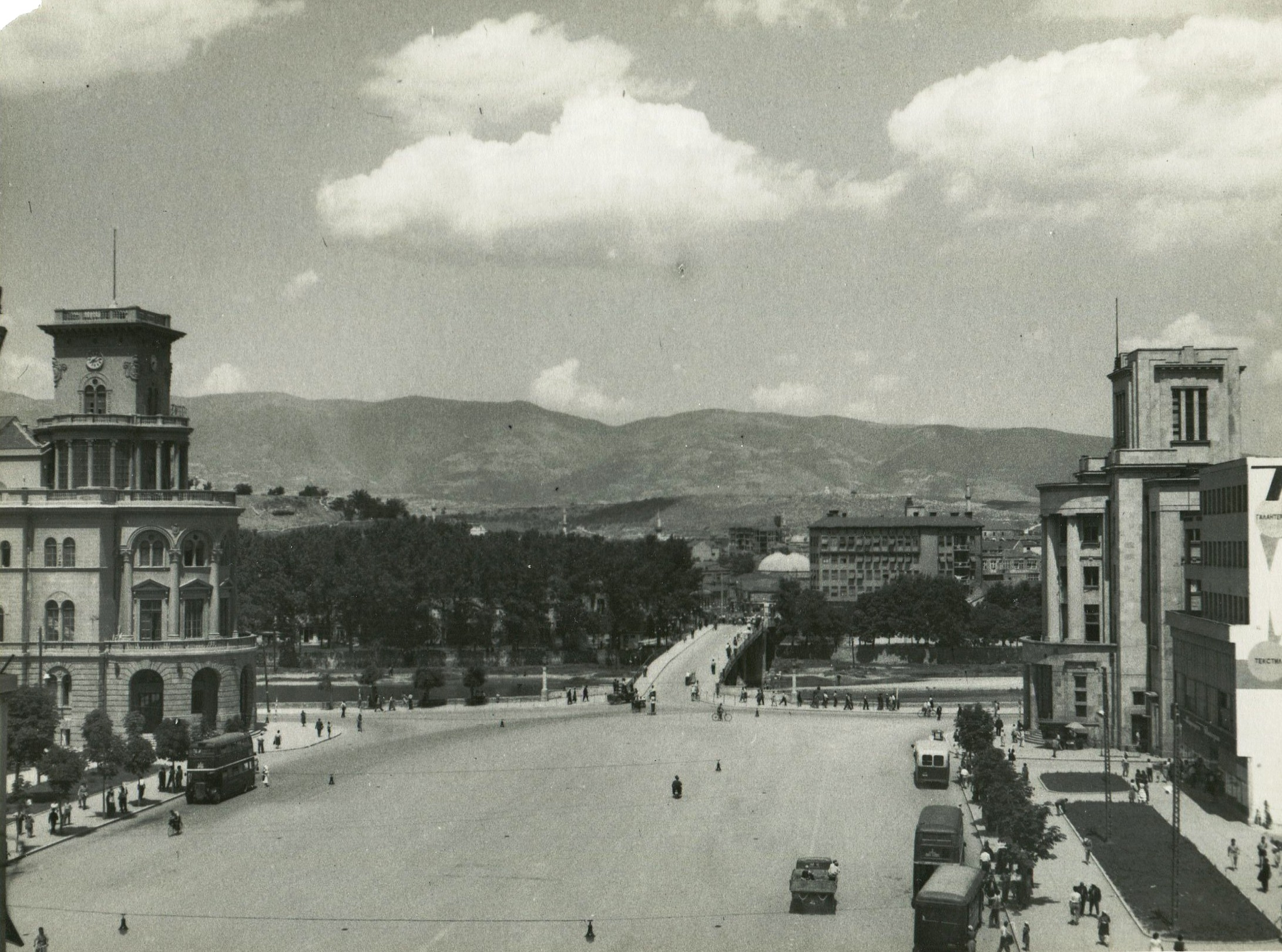
Maršal Tito Square, as it was called during the period of SFR Yugoslavia

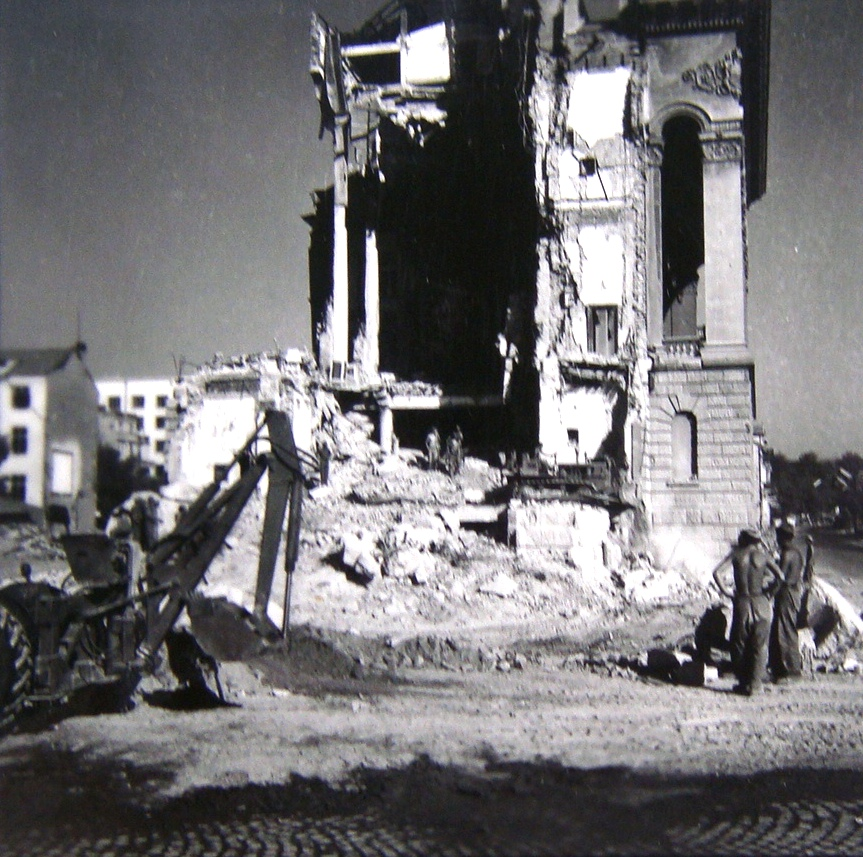
The Officers' Hall heavily damaged in the 1963 earthquake, later it was demolished completely

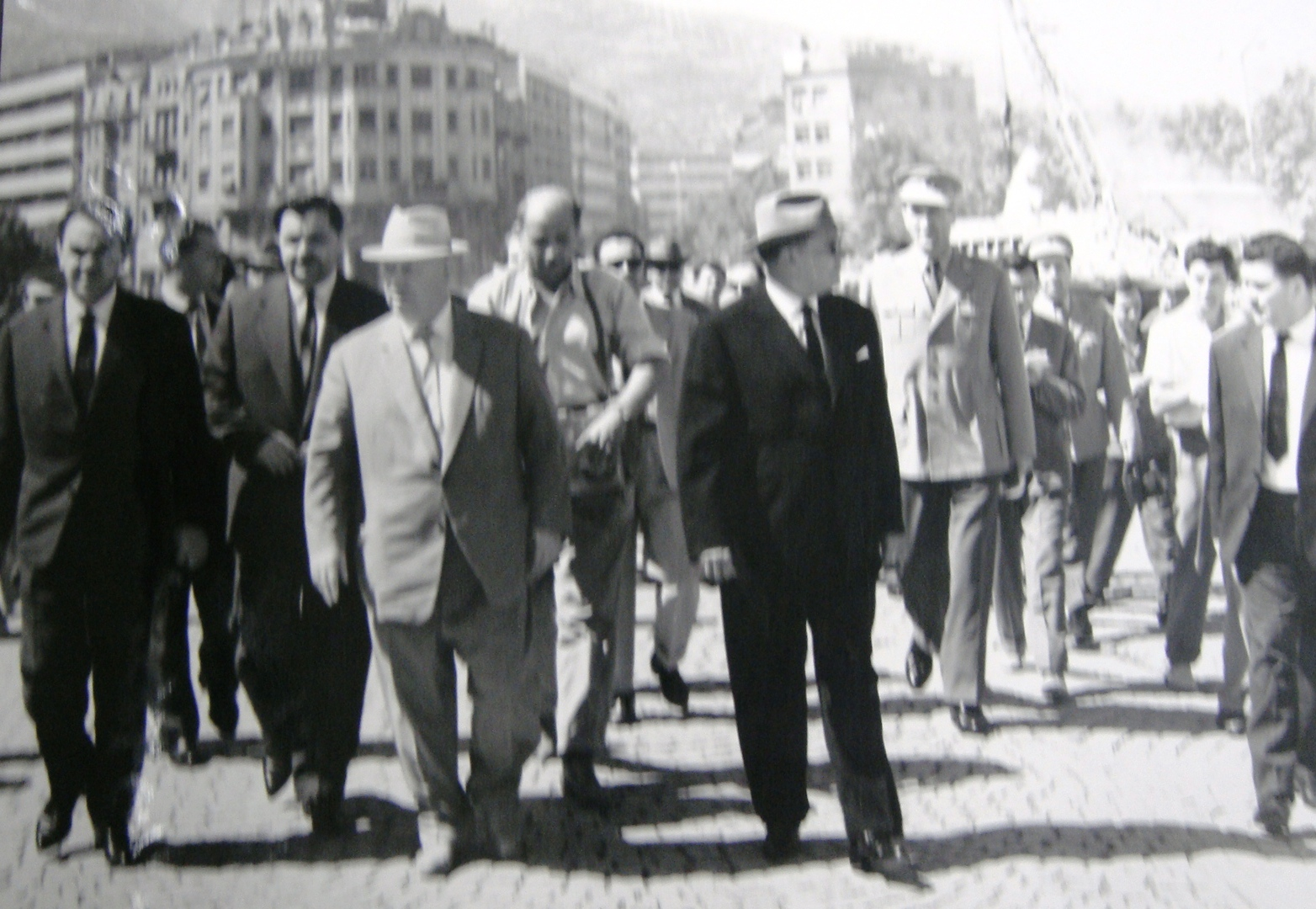
Nikita Khrushchev and Josip Broz Tito on the square, during their visit of Skopje after the earthquake in August 1963

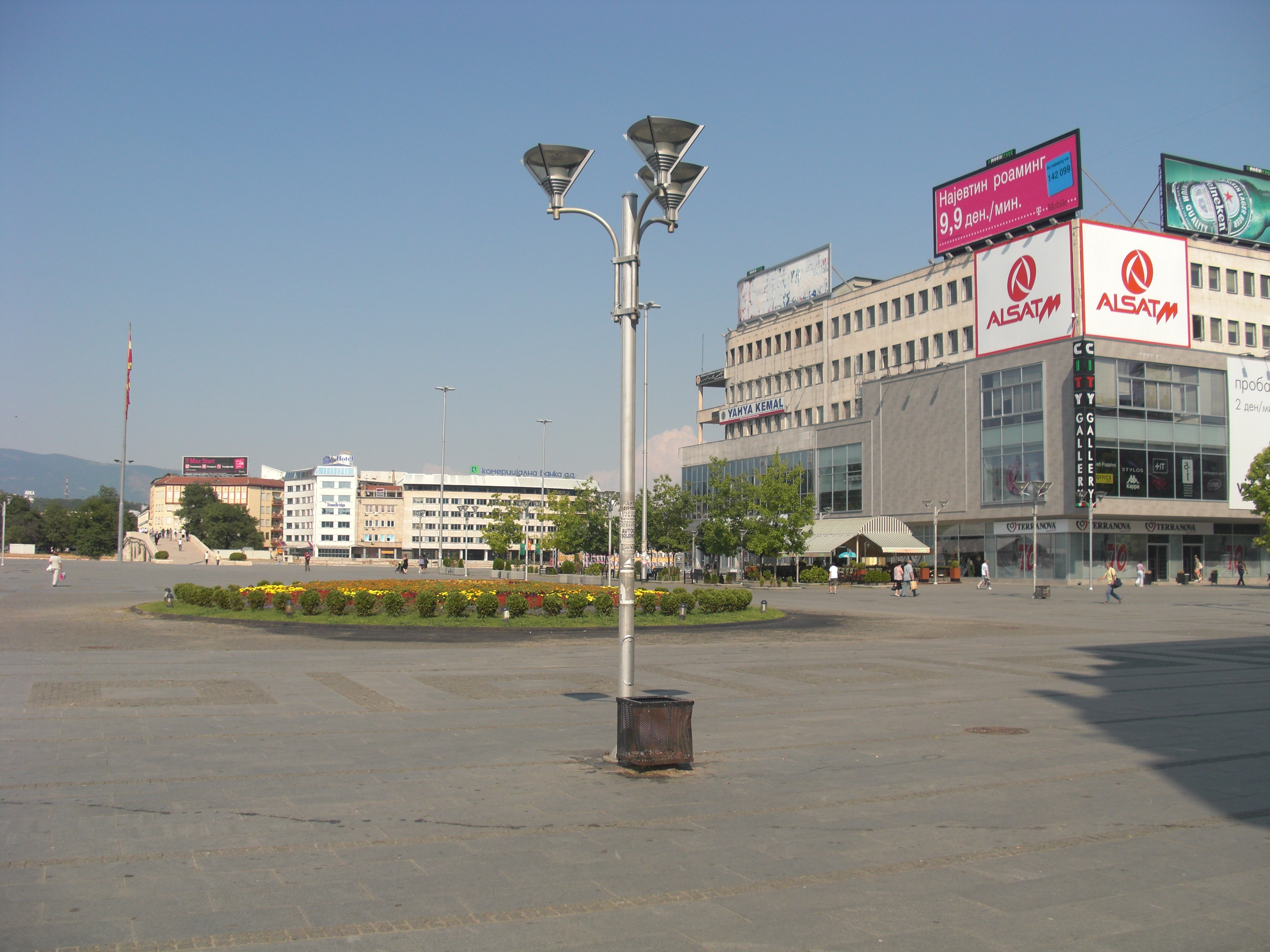
The square, in the late 2000s
