= Beeli =

Beeli is a surname. Notable people with the surname include:

- Binia Feltscher-Beeli (born 1978), Swiss curler
- Conradin Beeli von Belfort (died c. 1521), Grisons politician and military leader
- Conradin Beeli (1639–1712), Grisons military officer
- Conradin Beeli (c. 1700 – 1770), Grisons military officer
- Gaudenz Beeli (born 1947), Swiss bobsledder
- Georg Beeli von Belfort (c. 1500 – 1566), Grisons politician
- Georg Beeli von Belfort (died 1607), Grisons politician
- Johann Beeli von Belfort (1685–1742), Grisons politician and military officer
- Maurice Beeli (1879–1957), Belgian mycologist
- Nikolaus Beeli von Belfort (c. 1450 – after 1516), Grisons bailiff and politician

== See also ==
- Beeli family
- Belli (surname)
- Meeli
