= Beli =

Beli may refer to:

== People ==
- Beli ap Rhun (c. 580–c. 599), king of Gwynedd
- Beli I of Alt Clut (perhaps died c. 627), Brittonic king
- Beli II of Alt Clut (died c. died 722), Brittonic king
- Ljubiša Preletačević Beli (born 1991), Serbian political activist and satirical presidential candidate

== Mythology ==
- Beli (jötunn), a jötunn killed by Freyr in Norse mythology
- Beli Mawr, a Welsh ancestor deity
- Beli (or Bele), king of Sogn, from the Norse myth Frithiof's Saga

== Other uses ==
- Aegle marmelos or bael, a fruit-bearing plant common in South and South East Asia
- Beli, Croatia, a town on the Croatian island of Cres, named Caisole in Italian
- Beli, Kočani, a village in Kočani Municipality, Republic of North Macedonia
- Beli, Lucknow, a village in Uttar Pradesh, India
- Beli language, a Torricelli language of Papua New Guinea
- Beli language (South Sudan)
- Beli (moon), a moon of Saturn
- Jur Beli people, a people of Southern Sudan
- Beli (app), a restaurant-focused social media app

== See also ==
- Beli Breg (disambiguation)
- Beli Kamen (disambiguation)
- Beli Potok (disambiguation)
- Belli (disambiguation)
- Bely (disambiguation)
