= Belloni =

Belloni is an Italian surname. Notable people with the surname include:

- Alessandra Belloni (born 1954), Italian artist, teacher, and ethnomusicologist
- Andrea Belloni (died 1577), Italian Roman Catholic Bishop of Massa Lubrense
- Elisabetta Belloni (born 1958), Italian diplomat
- Ernesto Belloni (1833–1938), Italian businessman, academic and politician
- Gaetano Belloni (1892–1980), Italian cyclist
- Gino Belloni (1884–1924), Italian fencer
- Giorgio Belloni (1861–1944), Italian painter
- Girolamo Belloni (1688–1760), Italian author
- Gyula Belloni (1904–1977), Hungarian middle-distance runner
- José Belloni (1882–1965), Uruguayan sculptor
- Matthew Belloni (born 1976/1977), American entertainment journalist, podcaster, and former attorney
- Niccolò Belloni (born 1994), Italian footballer
- Nicolas Belloni (born 2001), Argentine footballer
- Robert C. Belloni (1919–1999), American judge
- Stelio Belloni (1920–1989), Uruguayan sculptor

== See also ==
- Belli (disambiguation)
- Bellini
