= Beli Breg =

Beli Breg may refer to:

- Beli Breg (Aleksinac), a village in the Aleksinac municipality of Nišava District, Serbia
- Beli Breg (Vranje), a village in the Vranje municipality of Pčinja District, Serbia
- Beli Breg, Bulgaria, a village in the Boychinovtsi Municipality, Bulgaria
- Beli Breg, Krško, a former village in the Municipality of Krško, Slovenia
