= Conradin Beeli =

Conradin Beeli may refer to:

- Conradin Beeli von Belfort (died c. 1521), Landammann of Davos and bailiff of Maienfeld
- Conradin Beeli (died 1712) (1639–1712), officer in Dutch service, killed in the Second War of Villmergen
- Conradin Beeli (died 1770) (c. 1700 – 1770), officer in French service
