= Belly =

Belly may refer to:

== Anatomy ==
- The abdomen, the part of the body between the pelvis and the thorax; or the stomach
  - A beer belly, an overhang of fat above the waist, presumed to be caused by regular beer drinking
  - Belly dance
- The fleshy, central part of a skeletal muscle (also known as a "muscle belly")

== People ==
- The nickname of the England cricketer Ian Bell
- Leon-August-Adolphe Belly, a 19th-century French painter
- Pierre Belly (1738–1814), Louisiana planter, lawyer and judge
- Belly Mujinga (1972/3–2020), Congolese-born transport worker who died in London from COVID-19

== Places ==
- Belly River, river in Alberta, Canada

== Music ==
- Belly (band), An American Alternative Rock band
- Belly (rapper) (born 1984), Canadian rap artist of Palestinian origin
- Lead Belly (1889–1949), real name Huddie William Ledbetter, American folk and blues musician
- Belly, an EP by The Beast
- The surface of a sound board, of a string instrument
- A kind of steelpan

== Other ==
- Belly (loyalty program), a digital loyalty program for small businesses
- Belly (film), a 1998 film
  - Belly (soundtrack), a 1998 soundtrack album of the film
- The draft, in a sail
- Tuna, belly (fatty tuna), also known as toro, used in Japanese food
- Belly landing, of an aircraft when it crashes onto a runway with its undercarriage retracted

== See also ==
- Belley (disambiguation)
