= Bely =

Bely (masculine), Belaya (feminine), or Beloye (neuter) may refer to:

- Bely (surname) (or Belaya), Russian last name
- Bely Island, in the Kara Sea, a part of Yamalo-Nenets Autonomous Okrug, Russia
- Bely, Russia (Belaya, Beloye), several inhabited localities in Russia
- Bely (volcano), Russia
- Belaya River, several rivers in Russia
- Belaya, Kursk Oblast, Russia
- Belaya air base, Irkutsk Oblast, Russia
- Lake Beloye (Vologda Oblast), Russia

== See also ==
- Beli (disambiguation)
- Bely Gorod
- Bely Yar
