= Kobilyak =

Kobilyak Кобиляк
- Village
- Location within Bulgaria
- Coordinates: 43°32′N 23°27′E
- Country: Bulgaria
- Province: Montana Province
- Municipality: Boychinovtsi
- Time zone: UTC+2 (EET)
  - Summer (DST): UTC+3 (EEST)

Kobilyak is a village in Boychinovtsi Municipality, Montana Province, north-western Bulgaria.

== Demographics ==
As of the 2021 Bulgarian census, the village of Kobilyak had a population of 256 residents. Recent estimates from 2024 suggest a modest increase, with the population rising to approximately 278 people, an average annual growth rate of 2.5% over three years. Spread across an area of 12.27 square kilometers, this brings the population density to about 22.66 inhabitants per square kilometer in 2024.

The gender distribution in 2021 showed a slight majority of female residents, with women making up 53.5% (137 individuals) of the population, compared to 46.5% (119 individuals) men. In terms of age structure, Kobilyak has a relatively balanced demographic profile. Children and adolescents aged 0–14 years account for 13.7% of the population, while the working-age group (15–64 years) make up the majority at 52.7%. A significant portion (33.6%) are aged 65 and over.

== Water quality ==
Kobilyak is among several villages in the Montana Province where the tap water is deemed unfit for drinking due to elevated levels of arsenic. According to data reported by Nova TV and confirmed by the regional health inspector, the concentration of arsenic in the village's water supply reaches 12 micrograms per liter, exceeding the permissible limit of 10 micrograms per liter. As a result, residents rely on water from water carriers.

Similar issues have been reported in nearby villages such as Gromshin and Beli Breg within the Boychinovtsi Municipality. Health officials have noted that prolonged consumption of water with these levels of arsenic may pose risks of poisoning or neurological health effects. Despite these concerns, registered cases of intestinal infections in the region have not been linked to the quality of the drinking water.

Local authorities have announced the discovery of a new water source, but its official approval and commissioning are still pending.
