= Georg Beeli von Belfort =

Georg Beeli von Belfort or Georg Beeli may refer to:

- Georg Beeli von Belfort (died 1566) (c. 1500 – 1566), governor of the Valtellina and Landammann of Davos
- Georg Beeli von Belfort (died 1607) (died 1607), Austrian bailiff at Castels, executed in Chur
