= Bellani =

Bellani is a surname of Italian origin. It may refer to:

- Adrian Bellani (born Gerardo Celasco; 1982), Italian actor
- Annalisa Bellani (1915–2015), Italian female tennis player
- Hicham Bellani (born 1979), Moroccan runner

== See also ==
- Belli (disambiguation)
- Belloni
