= Belli (surname) =

Belli is an Italian surname. Notable people with the surname include:

- Adriano Belli (born 1977), Canadian football player
- Agostina Belli (born 1947), Italian actress
- Alex Belli (born 1990), Italian model, media personality and actor
- Andrea Belli (1703–1772), Maltese architect and businessman
- Carlos Germán Belli (1927–2024), Peruvian poet of Italian parentage
- César Belli (born 1975), Brazilian footballer
- Daniel Belli (born 1963), Canadian sports shooter
- Domenico Belli (died 1627), Italian composer
- Edo Belli (1918–2003), American architect
- Emily Belli (born 1977), American physicist
- Francesco Belli (born 1994), Italian footballer
- Gabriella Belli (born 1952), Italian art historian
- Gioconda Belli (born 1948), Nicaraguan poet and writer
- Giovanni Battista Belli-Bernasconi (1770–1827), Russian architect active in Saint Petersburg
- Giovanni Battista de Belli (1630–1693), Italian Roman Catholic Bishop
- Girolamo Belli (1552 – c. 1620), Italian composer
- Giulio Belli (c. 1560 – 1621 or later), Italian composer
- Giuseppe Gioachino Belli (1791–1863), Italian poet, famous for his sonnets in Romanesco dialect
- Giuseppe Belli (singer) (d. 1760), sometimes referred to as Giovanni Belli, Italian castrato singer
- Humberto Belli (born 1945), Nicaraguan politician and writer
- John Belli (died 1809), United States Army Quartermaster General
- Laura Belli (born 1947), Italian actress and singer
- Marisa Belli (1933–2017), Italian stage, television and film actress
- Mary Lou Belli, American television director and writer
- Melvin Belli (1907–1996), American lawyer, writer and actor
- Mihri Belli (1916–2011), Turkish politician
- Paolo Belli (born 1962), Italian singer and television presenter
- Peter Belli (1943–2023), Danish singer and actor
- Pierangelo Belli (1944–2026), Italian footballer
- Pierino Belli (1502–1575), Italian soldier and jurist
- Remo Belli (1927–2016), American jazz drummer
- Valerio Belli (c. 1468 – 1546), Italian medallist and engraver
- Willam Belli (born 1982), American actor and drag queen
- Wladimir Belli (born 1970), Italian cyclist
