= Beli Potok =

Beli Potok may refer to:

- Beli Potok (Belgrade), a suburb of Belgrade in Serbia
- Beli Potok (Knjaževac), a village in the municipality of Knjaževac, Serbia
- Beli Potok (Sokobanja), a village in the municipality of Sokobanja, Serbia
- Beli Potok (Leskovac), a village in the municipality of Leskovac, Serbia
- Beli Potok pri Lembergu, a village in the municipality of Šmarje pri Jelšah, Slovenia
- Beli Potok pri Frankolovem, a village in the municipality of Vojnik, Slovenia
