= Belli (disambiguation) =

The Belli were an ancient pre-Roman Celtic Celtiberian people that lived in the modern Spanish province of Zaragoza.

Belli may also refer to:

- Belli (surname)
- Belli, Bismil
- Belli (Metal), a synonym for silver in Kannada-language from South India
- Belli (film), a 2014 Kannada-language Indian drama film
- Belli dentro, an Italian comedy television series
- Belli Moda, a 1967 Kannada movie by Puttanna Kanagal
- Belli Modagalu, a 1992 Indian Kannada language drama film, directed by K. V. Raju
- Belli Park, Queensland, suburb on the Sunshine Coast, Queensland, Australia
- Casus belli, a Latin expression meaning "An act or event that provokes or is used to justify war"

== See also ==
- Beli (disambiguation)
- Belly (disambiguation)
