= Belley (disambiguation) =

Belley is a commune in Eastern France.

Belley may also refer to:

== Places ==
- Canton of Belley
- Arrondissement of Belley

== People ==
- Jean-Baptiste Belley (c. 1746–1805), former slave and member of the National Convention and the Council of Five Hundred of France
- Louis de Gonzague Belley, (1863–1930), Canadian politician
- Marlène Belley (born 1963), Canadian poet

== See also ==
- du Bellay family, a French noble family from the historic Anjou region
- Lisa Ann Beley (born 1967), a Canadian voice actress
- Belly (disambiguation)
