= Marchevo, Montana Province =

Marchevo Мърчево
- Village
- Location within Bulgaria
- Coordinates: 43.5133°N 23.3467°E
- Country: Bulgaria
- Province: Montana Province
- Municipality: Boychinovtsi
- Time zone: UTC+2 (EET)
  - Summer (DST): UTC+3 (EEST)

Marchevo is a village in Boychinovtsi Municipality, Montana Province, north-western Bulgaria.
