= Bely (surname) =

Bely (Russian: Белый; masculine) or Belaya (Белая; feminine) is a Russian abe Belarusian (Russian: Белы) last name meaning "white". It may also be transliterated as "Belyi" or "Beliy". Ukrainina form: Bilyi. Notable people with the surname include:

- Anatoliy Beliy (born 1972), Russian and Israeli actor
- Andrei Bely (1880–1934), pseudonym of Boris Bugayev, a Russian novelist, poet, and literary critic
- Gennady Belyi (1951–2001), Soviet, Ukrainian, and Russian mathematician
- Mikhail Bely, Russian diplomat, Russian ambassador to Japan
- Pyotr Bely (born 1971), Russian artist
- Viacheslav Belyi (1945–2020) Soviet and Russian physicist
- Viktor Bely (1904–1983), Russian composer and social activist

== See also ==
- Beli (disambiguation)
