= Beli Kamen =

Beli Kamen (Serbian Cyrillic: Бели Камен) is a Serbo-Croatian place name, meaning "white stone". It may refer to several places:

- Beli Kamen, Lučani, Serbia
- Beli Kamen, Prokuplje, Serbia
- Beli Kamen, Kočevje, Slovenia
