= Boychinovtsi =

Boychinovtsi Бойчиновци
- Town (Град)
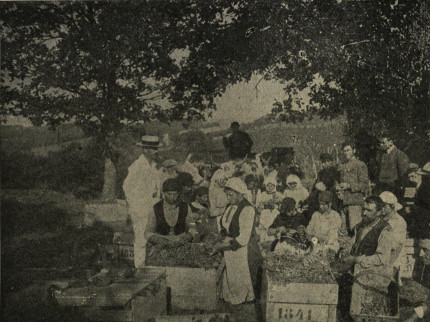
- Harvesting of wine grapes at Minkowa Machala (now Kwartal Ogosta of Boychinovtsi), 1928

- Location of Boychinovtsi
- Coordinates: 43°28′N 23°20′E
- Country: Bulgaria
- Province (Oblast): Montana
- Municipality: Boychinovtsi

Government
  - Mayor: Stefcho Kostadinov

Population (31.12.2009)
  - Total: 1,648
- Time zone: UTC+2 (EET)
  - Summer (DST): UTC+3 (EEST)
- Postal Code: 3430
- Area code: 09513

Boychinovtsi (Bulgarian: Бойчиновци, also transliterated as Boichinovtsi, Boichovci, Boychonovci, or Boychinovtzi; pronounced [bojˈt͡ʃinovt͡si]) is a town (град) in northwestern Bulgaria, the administrative centre of Boychinovtsi Municipality (Община Бойчиновци), Montana Province (Област Монтана). It is near the city of Montana. As of December 2009, the town had a population of 1,648.
