= Gioconda Belli =

Nicaraguan author, novelist and poet

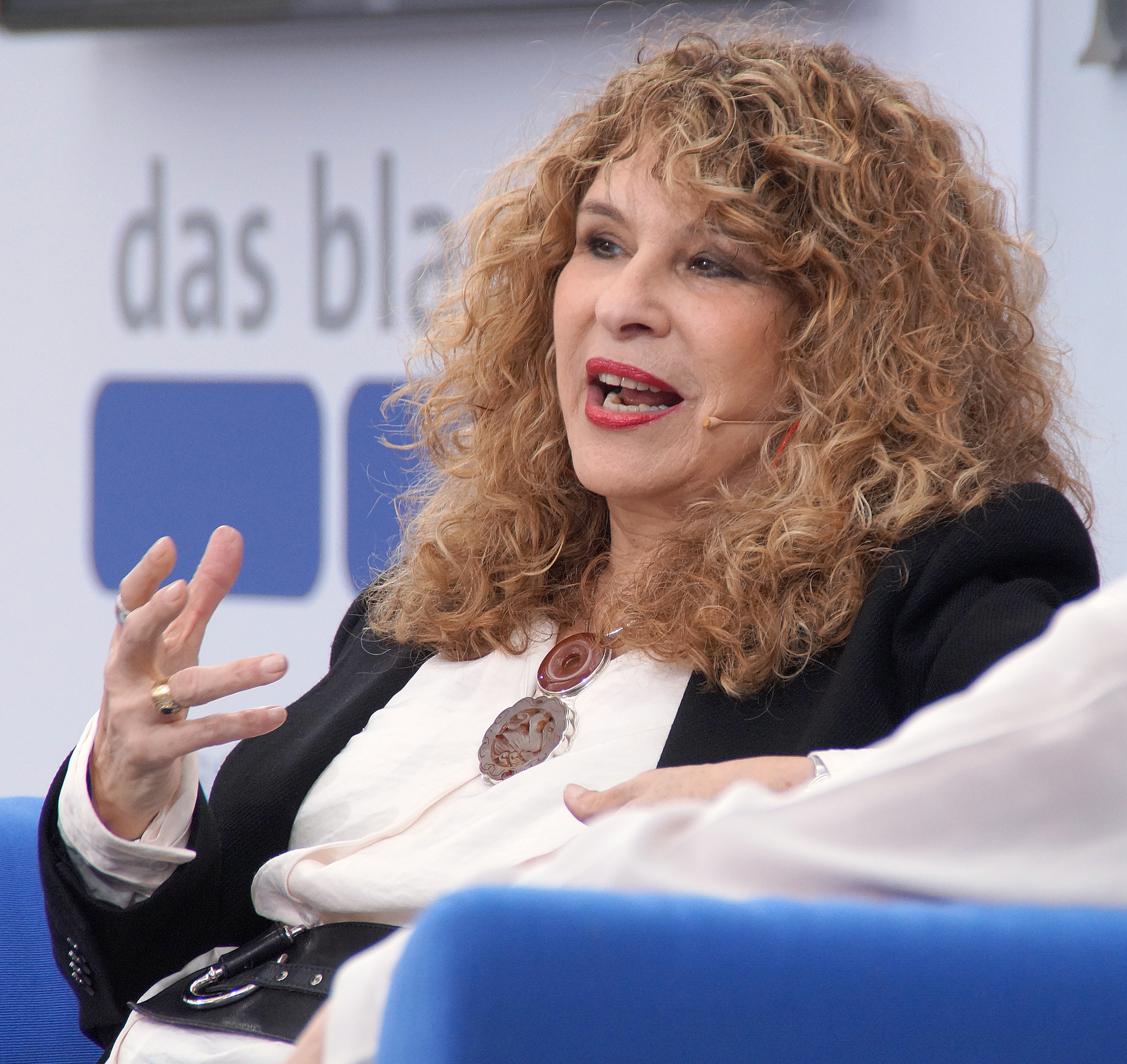
- Belli at Leipzig Book Fair 2016
- Born: December 9, 1948 (age 77); Managua, Nicaragua
- Occupations: Poet, author, novelist

Gioconda Belli Pereira (born December 9, 1948) is a Nicaraguan novelist and poet known for her contributions to Nicaraguan literature.

== Early life ==
Gioconda Belli grew up in a wealthy family in Managua. Her father is Humberto Belli Zapata and her brother is Humberto Belli.

She attended boarding school in Spain, graduated from the Royal School of Santa Isabel in Madrid, and studied advertising and journalism at the Charles Morris Price School of Advertising and Journalism in Philadelphia. She married and had her first daughter at 19 when she returned to Nicaragua.

== Career ==
Belli began her career at Pepsi-Cola as liaison to the company's advertising agency, Publisa, which then hired her as an account executive.

Through one of her colleagues at the advertising agency, Belli met Camilo Ortega, who introduced her to the Sandinistas and asked her to join the group.

In 1970, Belli joined the struggle against the Somoza dictatorship, sworn into the movement by Leana Ortega, Camilo Ortega's wife. Belli's work for the movement led to her being forced into exile in Mexico in 1975. Returning in 1979 just before the Sandinista victory, she became FSLN's international press liaison in 1982 and the director of State Communications in 1984. During that time she met Charles Castaldi, an American NPR journalist, whom she married in 1987. After 1990 she split her time between Managua and Los Angeles. She has since left the FSLN and became a major critic of the Ortega government. She lives in exile in Madrid.

=== Writing ===
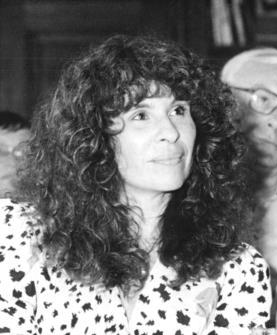
Belli in 1989

In 1970, Belli published her first poems in the literary supplement of Nicaraguan newspaper La Prensa. In 1972, she won the Premio de Poesía Mariano Fiallos Gil award from the National Autonomous University of Nicaragua.

In 1988, publication of Belli's La Mujer Habitada (The Inhabited Woman), a semi-autobiographical novel, that raised gender issues for the first time in the Nicaraguan revolutionary narratives, brought her increased attention; this book has been published in several languages and was on the reading list at four universities in the United States. The novel follows two parallel stories: the indigenous resistance to the Spanish and modern insurgency in Central America with various points in common: women's emancipation, passion, and a commitment to liberation. In 2000, she published her autobiography, emphasizing her involvement in the revolutionary movement, El país bajo mi piel, published under the name The Country Under My Skin in the United States; it was a finalist for the Los Angeles Times Book Prize in 2003. Belli continues publishing and maintains that poetry is her most important work. Belli was the recipient of the Premio Casa de las Américas in 1978. In 2008 Belli received the Premio Biblioteca Breve for her book El infinito en la palma de la mano (Infinity in the Palm of The Hand), an allegory about Adam and Eve in paradise.

Belli's books have been published in numerous languages.

Her 2010 book was submitted with the title "Crónicas de la Izquierda Erótica", but had to be changed to "El País de las Mujeres", since the previous title was too similar to that of a 1973 book by Ana María Rodas: Poemas de la Izquierda Erótica. The book tells the story of a world governed by women. In the novel, she portrays a group of women that take power by means of a Political Party named "Partido de la Izquierda Erótica". This is the same name as a movement formed by women during the 80s, to which Belli belonged, which had been named as a tribute to Rodas' work. Her novel El intenso calor de la luna was released in August in Latin America, and in September 2014 in Spain.

=== Political activity ===
Belli opposed the dictatorship of Anastasio Somoza Debayle. From 1970, when she began writing her poems, and like many intellectuals of her generation, she joined the ranks of the Sandinista National Liberation Front (FSLN), at that time a clandestine and persecuted organization whose aim was the overthrow of the Somoza regime. She was a clandestine courier, transported weapons, travelled around Europe and Latin America, obtaining resources and spreading the word about the Sandinista struggle. She became a member of the FSLN's Political-Diplomatic Commission.

In 2018, Belli took a stand against the government of Daniel Ortega, which emerged from the 2016 elections, and became an active member of the Sandinista renewal movement.

In February 2023, the Ortega government stripped Nicaraguan citizenship from Belli. On February 23, 2023, Belli accepted Chilean citizenship, after the Chilean Government offered nationality and asylum to all the Nicaraguans banished by Ortega.

== Awards ==
- XXVIII "City of Melilla" International Poetry Award
- "Mariano Fiallos Gil de Poesía" award, Nicaragua 1972
- "Casa de las Américas" award, Cuba, Poesía 1978
- Award of the "Fundación de Libreros, Bibliotecarios" and "Editores Alemanes de la Fundación Friederich Ebhert" in 1989 for La Mujer Habitada, the "best political novel of the year"
- "Anna Seghers de la Academia de Artes de Alemania" award, 1989
- "Luchs del Semanario Die Zeit a su libro" award for El Taller de las Mariposas, 1992
- Medal of recognition of the National Theater of Nicaragua for 25 years of cultural labor
- "Internacional de Poesía Generación del 27" award, 2002
- "Pluma de Plata" award, Bilbao, 2005
- "Biblioteca Breve Award", 2008
- Sor Juana Inés de la Cruz Prize for "best novel", International Book Fair in Guadalajara, 2008
- "Oxfam Novib/PEN Award" 2019, Winternachten festival in the Hague (with Palestinian poet Dareen Tatour)
- Honorary Doctorate from the University of Edinburgh, 2024
- Carlos Fuentes Prize, 2025

== Bibliography ==
- Verse Sobre la grama (1972)
- Línea de fuego (1978)
- Truenos y arco iris (1982)
- Amor insurrecto (1985)
- De la costilla de Eva (1987)
  - From Eves Rib, translated by Stephen F. White. Northwestern University Press (1995) ISBN 1-880684-13-6
- La mujer habitada (1988)
- Poesía reunida (1989)
- Sofía de los presagios (1990)
- El ojo de la mujer (1991)
- Sortilegio contra el frío (1992)
- El taller de las mariposas (1994)
- Waslala (1996)
- El país bajo mi piel (2001)
- El pergamino de la seducción (2005)
- El infinito en la palma de la mano (2008)
  - Infinity in the Palm of Her Hand, translated by Margaret Sayers Peden. HarperCollins (2009) ISBN 978-0-06-167364-1
- El país de las mujeres (2010)
- El intenso calor de la luna (2014)
