= Death of Belly Mujinga =

2020 death of a woman from COVID-19

The death of Belly Mujinga, a 47-year-old Congolese-born woman, occurred in Barnet, North London, United Kingdom on 5 April 2020 from COVID-19 related complications. Mujinga was selling tickets for Govia Thameslink Railway at London Victoria station when she and a coworker, Motolani Sunmola, neither of whom had PPE, were allegedly spat and coughed on by a 57-year-old man who claimed to have the virus at 11:22 a.m. on 21 March 2020.

Mujinga was later taken to Barnet Hospital with COVID-19, put on a ventilator, and later died. According to a worker at the station, Mujinga had requested that she work in the enclosure due to her respiratory issues, but all were forced to work on the concourse without masks.

Mujinga's death inspired a number of protests after her case was closed in May 2020 in the United Kingdom demanding justice, as well as better treatment of frontline workers, particularly black and minority workers. A petition garnered over 2 million signatures. These protests overlapped with the George Floyd protests and were joined by Mujinga's husband, Lusamba Katalay. Mujinga is considered by many to be a face of the Black Lives Matter movement in the UK.

== Background ==
Belly Mujinga
- Born: 1972 or 1973; Kinshasa, Zaire
- Died: 5 April 2020 (aged 47); Barnet Hospital, Barnet, London, United Kingdom
- Cause of death: Complications related to COVID-19 and sarcoidosis
- Education: University of Kinshasa
- Employers: RTNC; Govia Thameslink Railway
- Spouse: Lusamba Gode Katalay (m. 2011)
- Children: 1

Belly Mujinga was born in Kinshasa, Zaire (now known as the Democratic Republic of the Congo). She graduated from the University of Kinshasa with a degree in journalism. She worked for RTNC, the Congolese national broadcaster; she was the network's first woman sports reporter. Due to the unrest following the assassination of President Laurent-Désiré Kabila in 2001, she relocated to the UK for security reasons where she got a job at a post office in Edgware. She married Lusamba Katalay (whom she met at a church in Hackney) in 2011 and had a daughter. Mujinga had a rare form of sarcoidosis.

== Investigation and legal action ==
The case began with Govia Thameslink Railway conducting an internal investigation in April 2020 before the police got involved as pushed by Mujinga's union TSSA, who supported Mujinga and Sunmola's claims.

TSSA issued a press release describing the incident on 12 May, opening the case to the police. Police reviewed CCTV footage, which lacked details but indicated with "no doubt that something has happened there". However on 29 May, they announced following an interview with the man that a test had shown he did not have the virus, and that he had confessed to coughing but they could not prove it was deliberate, thus they would not do anything.

Following a series of protests, the case was reopened on 5 June. After the British Transport Police reported no further evidence, the Crown Prosecution Service did not press charges.

On 17 October 2020, a BBC Panorama documentary on Mujinga's case aired. Barrister Christopher Williams advised pursuing an inquest as an option for the family seeking justice and peace. Martin Forde QC agreed that there was "sufficient doubts and conflicts around the facts" to justify it.

As of the anniversary of her death, the family's lawyer Lawrence Davies was seeking a private prosecution, but to no avail as the suspect remained anonymous. Secretary of State for Transport Grant Shapps told Davies he was awaiting a decision from Senior Coroner Andrew Walker to hold an inquest.

In May 2021, Walker confirmed the inquest is set to be held, suggesting her death may have indeed been "unnatural". Emphasis has been placed on concerns regarding the provision of PPE and endangerment of an at-risk employee during a pandemic, especially in light of other employees at the station falling ill.

In January 2022, the date for an inquest had still not been set, and a coroner apologised to Mujinga's family for the delay at a hearing. On 20 June 2022, Barnet Coroner's court listed all sessions in the week commencing Monday 27 June 2022 to be set aside for the inquest.

The inquest concluded on 2 March 2023 that Mujinga died from "natural causes" as a result of both COVID-19 and sarcoidosis.

== Funeral and memorial ==
Mujinga's funeral took place on 29 April. Only 10 people, including her husband and daughter, could attend due to lockdown restrictions. A GoFundMe organised by TSSA to cover the funeral costs raised over £200,000.

On the anniversary of her death, a vigil attended by Katalay was held outside Victoria station at 11:22 a.m. Vigils were also held outside other Govia Thameslink stations such as Bedford, Brighton, Harlington, East Croydon, and Tooting.
