= The Beast (band) =

American hip hop group

- Origin: Durham, North Carolina
- Genres: Hip hop, soul
- Years active: 2007–present
- Members: Pierce Freelon, Eric Hirsh, Stephen Coffman, Peter Kimosh
- Website: http://www.thebeastmusic.com

The Beast is an American alternative hip hop band from Durham, North Carolina. They were formed in 2007 by emcee Pierce Freelon, drummer Stephen Coffman, bassist Peter Kimosh and pianist Eric Hirsh. All members of the band are graduates of UNC Chapel Hill. The Beast is best known for their 2010 album, Freedom Suite, which was recorded with jazz vocalist Nnenna Freelon and released in collaboration with Okayplayer's jazz channel The Revivalist. Other artists the Beast has collaborated with include 9th Wonder, YahZarah, Phonte, The Apple Juice Kid, Geechi Suede (of Camp Lo) and Branford Marsalis. The band has been praised for their progressive lyrics and eclectic, jazz-based production.

== Discography ==
- Belly (EP, 2008)
- Silence Fiction (2009)
- Freedom Suite (2010)
- Guru Legacy (EP, 2011)
- Gardens (EP, 2013)
- Stories (EP, 2014)
- Doin' What I Love (single, 2015)
- Woke (2017)
