= Beli Potok, Knjaževac =

Beli Potok Бели Поток
- Village
- Location within Serbia
- Coordinates: 43°32′09″N 22°04′56″E
- Country: Serbia
- District: Zaječar District
- Municipality: Knjaževac

Population (2002)
  - Total: 243
- Time zone: UTC+1 (CET)
  - Summer (DST): UTC+2 (CEST)

Beli Potok is a village in the municipality of Knjaževac, Serbia. According to the 2002 census, the village had a population of 243.
