= Beli Potok (Leskovac) =

Beli Potok Бели Поток
- Village
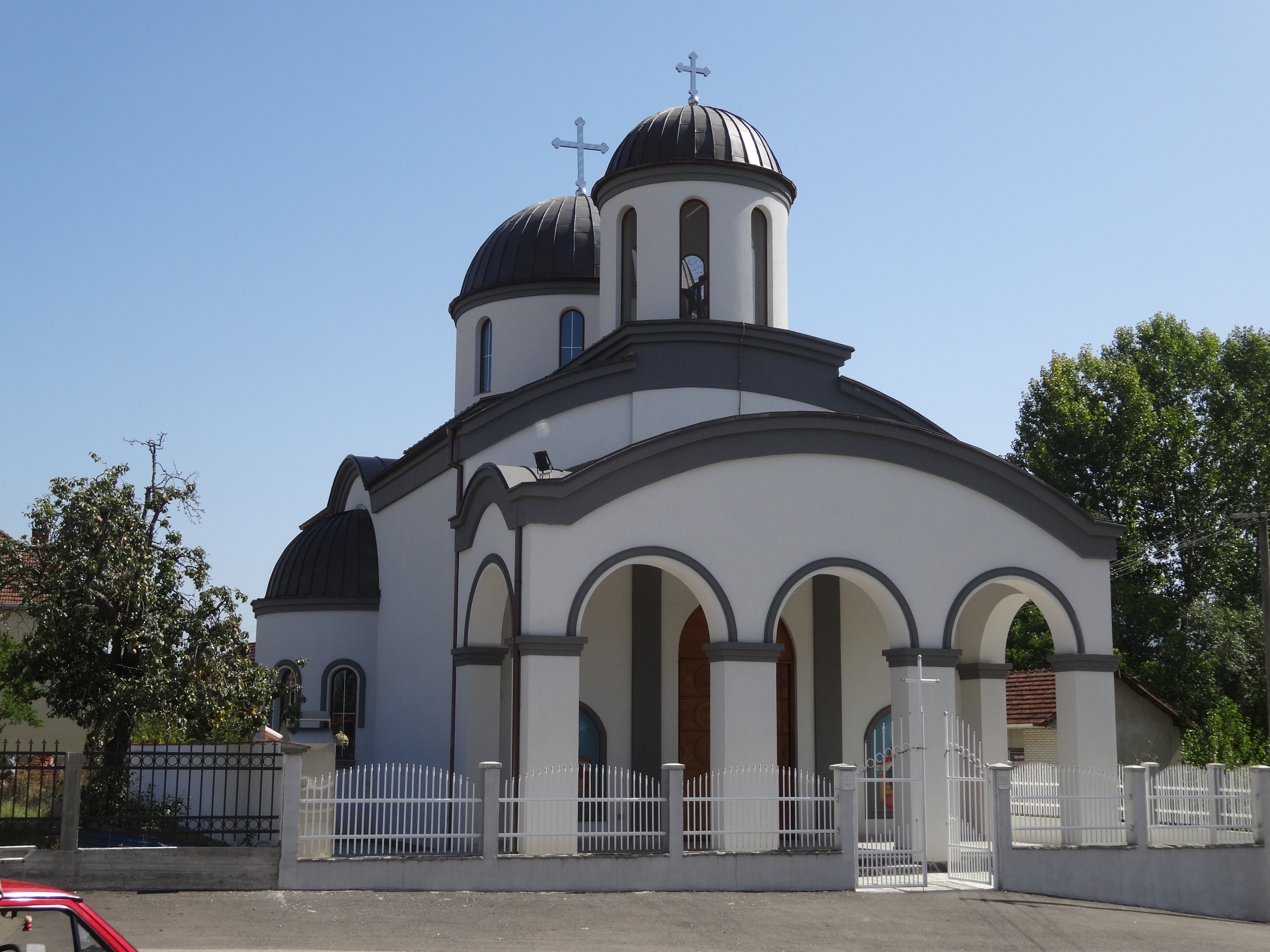

- Location within Serbia
- Coordinates: 42°53′11″N 21°55′01″E
- Country: Serbia
- District: Jablanica District
- Municipality: Leskovac
- Elevation: 1,004 ft (306 m)

Population (2002)
  - Total: 629
- Time zone: UTC+1 (CET)
  - Summer (DST): UTC+2 (CEST)

Beli Potok is a village in the municipality of Leskovac, Serbia. According to the 2002 census, the village has a population of 629 people.

== Gallery ==
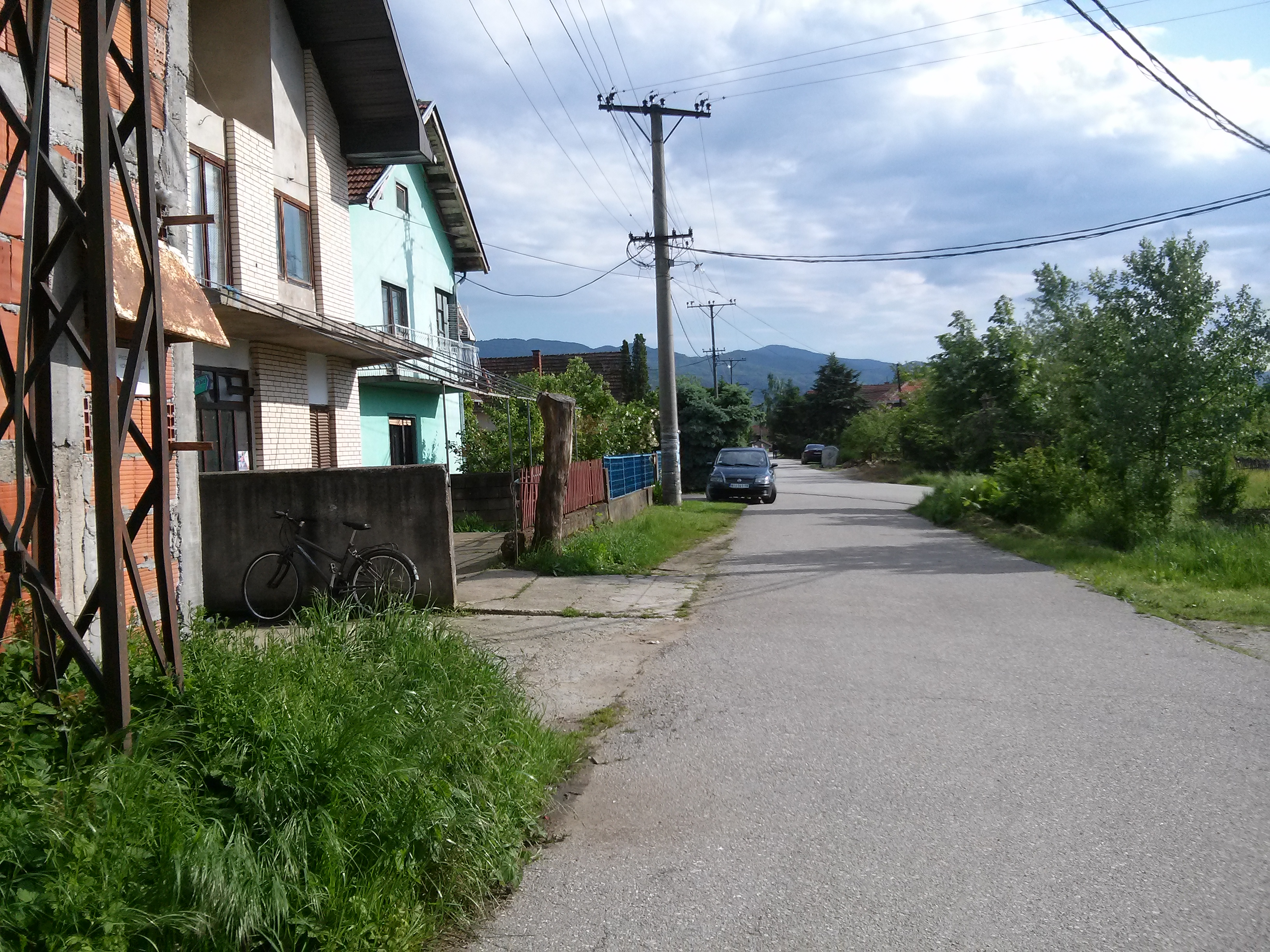
A street in the village.

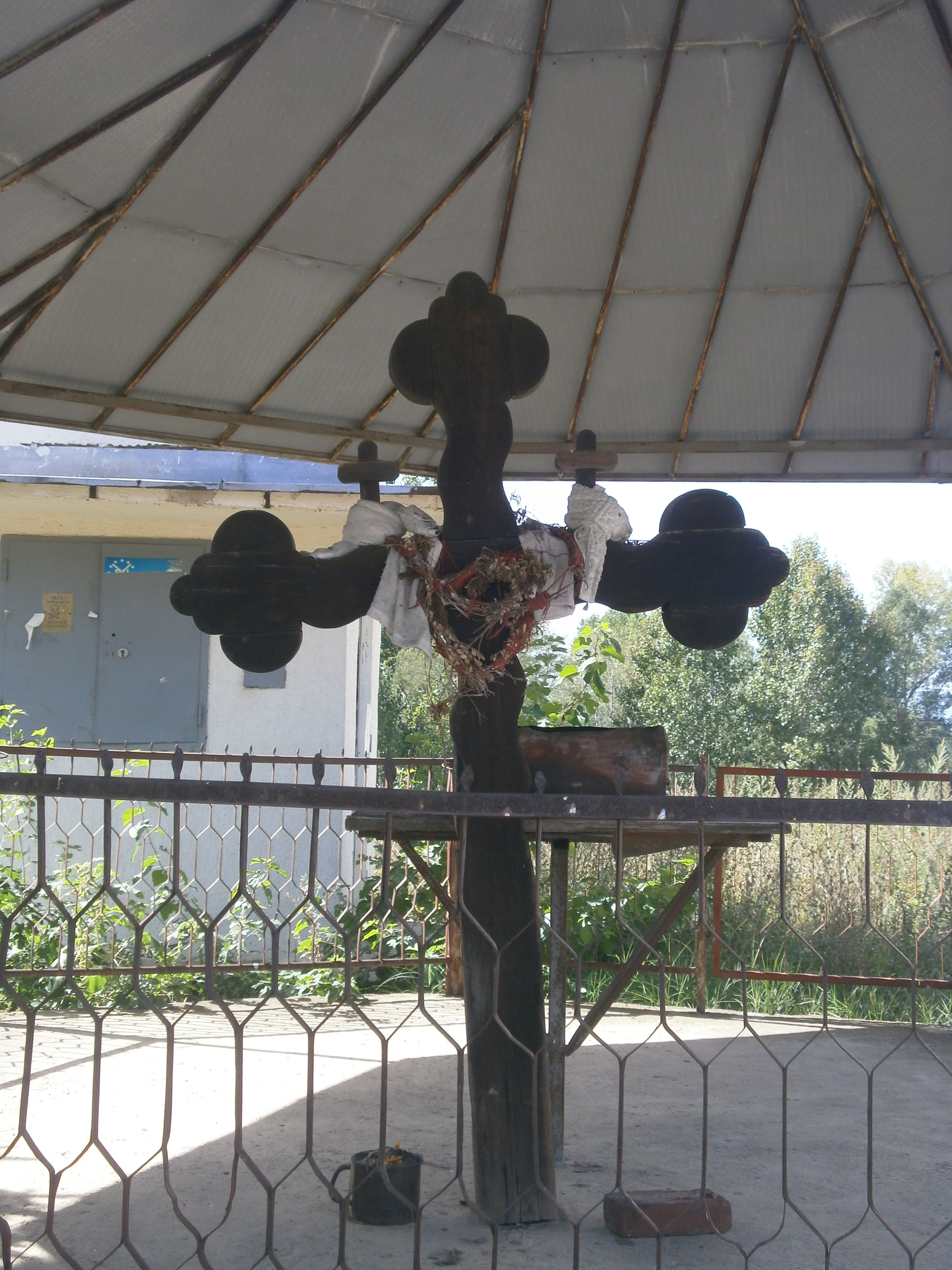
Orthodox cross.

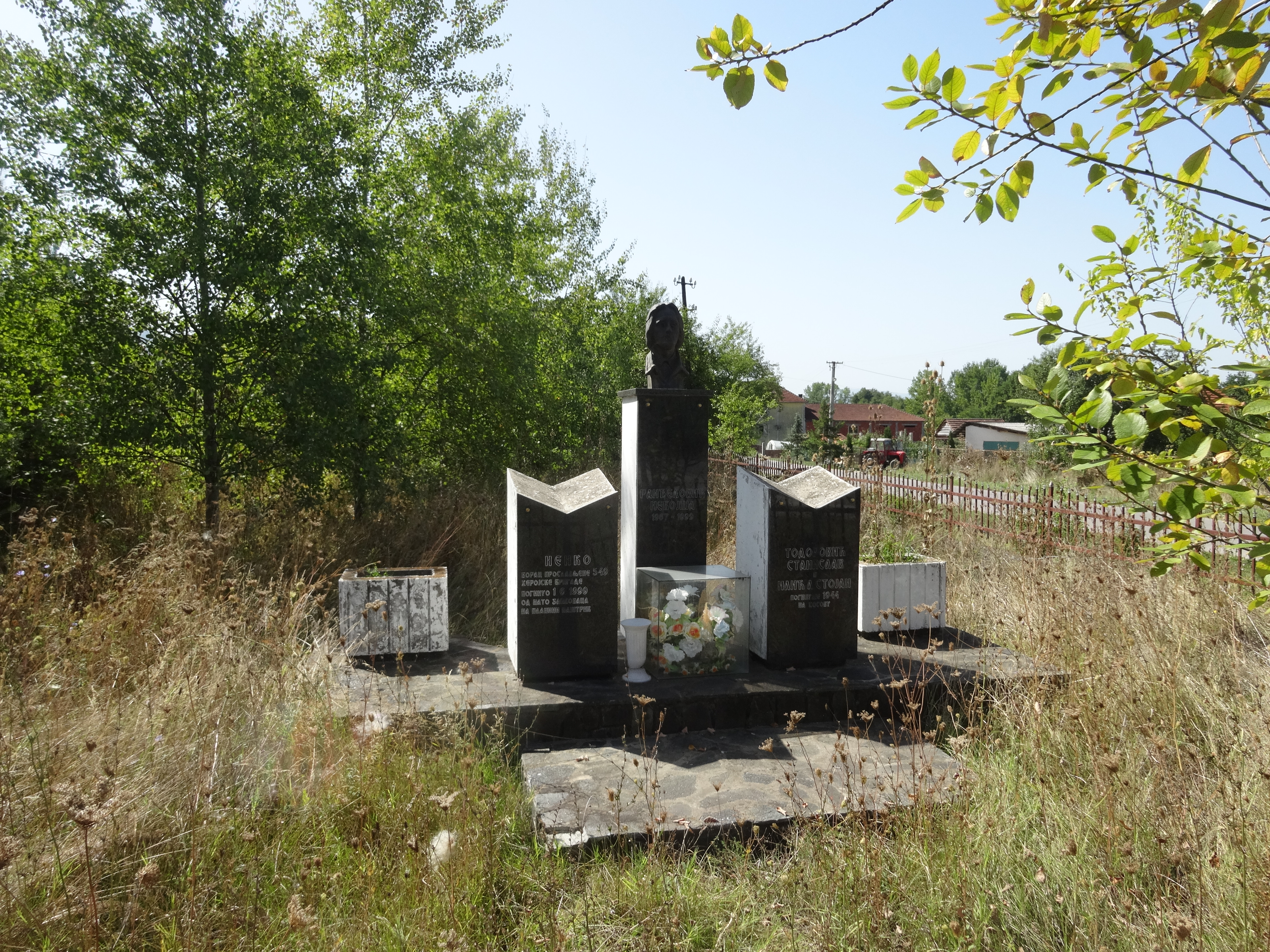
A memorial.

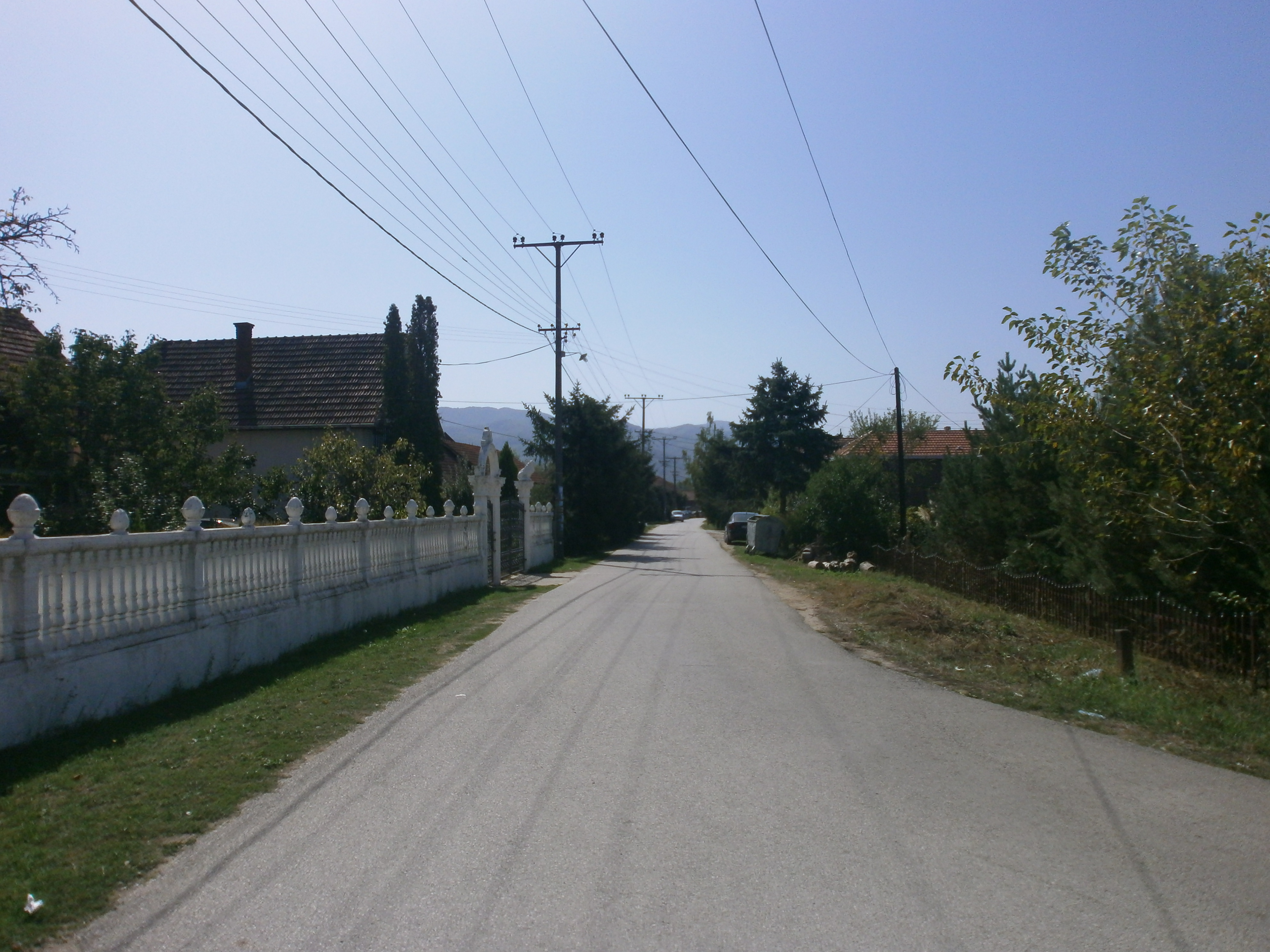
A street in the village.

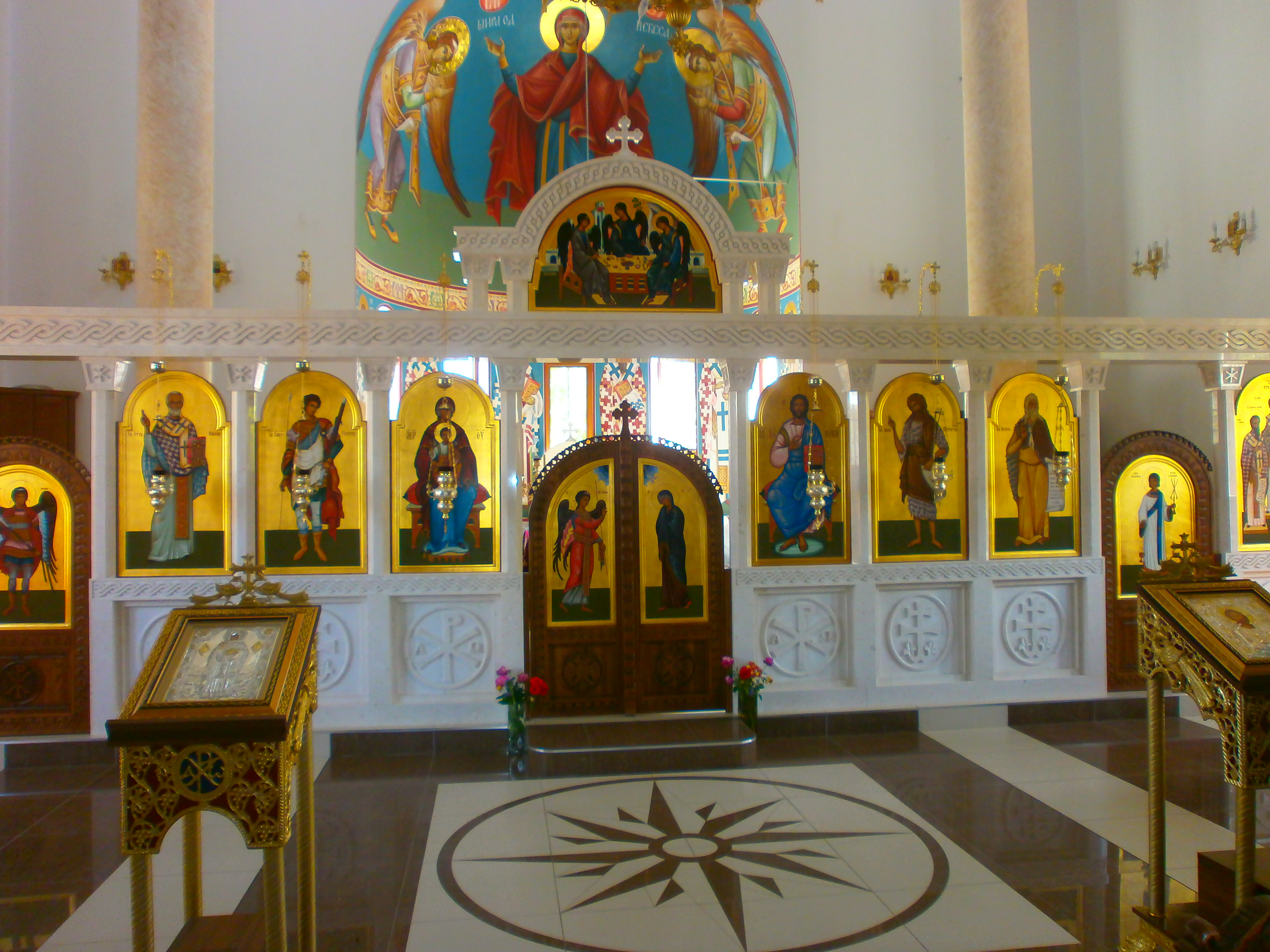
Orthodox church.

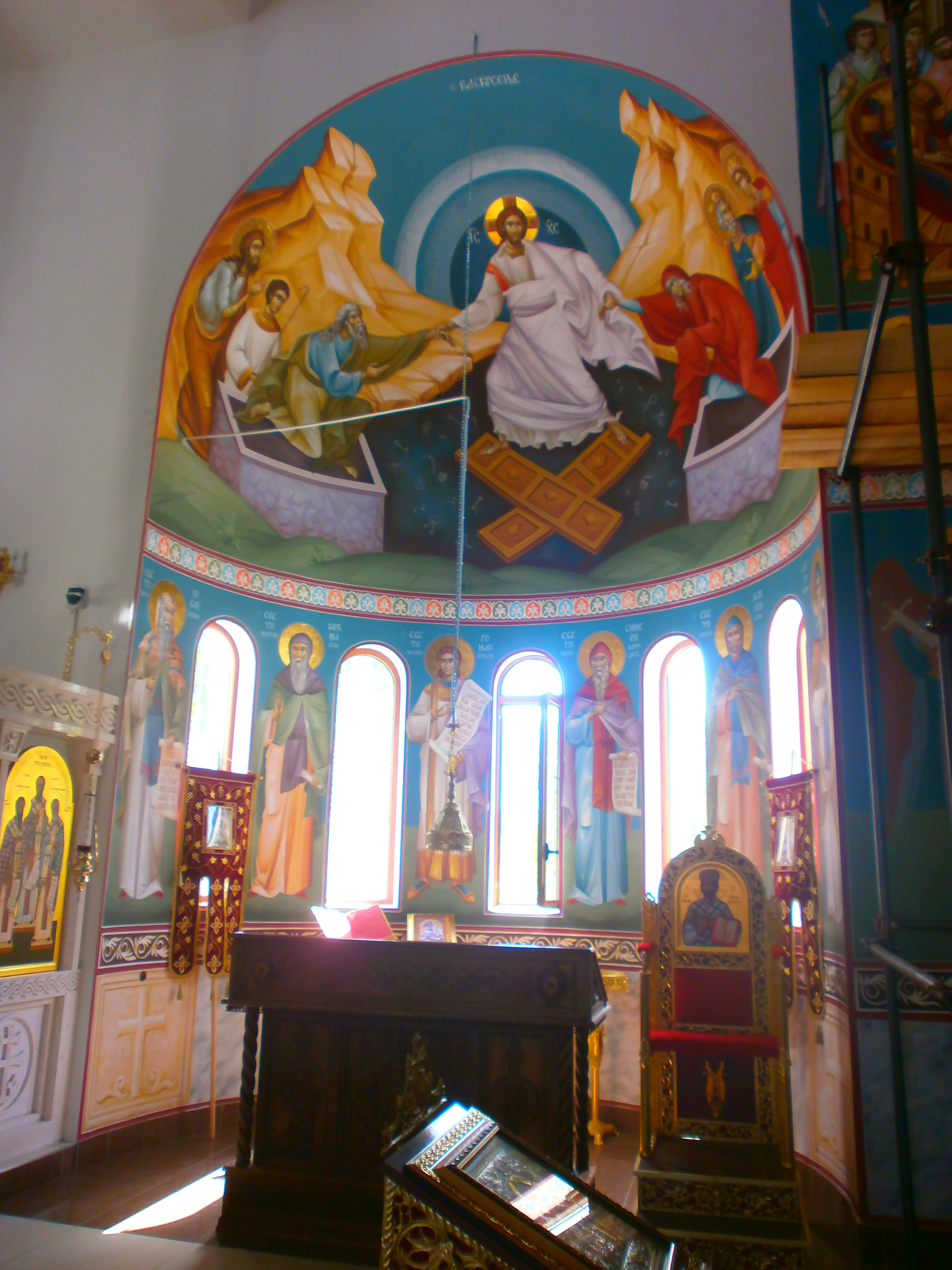
Orthodox church.

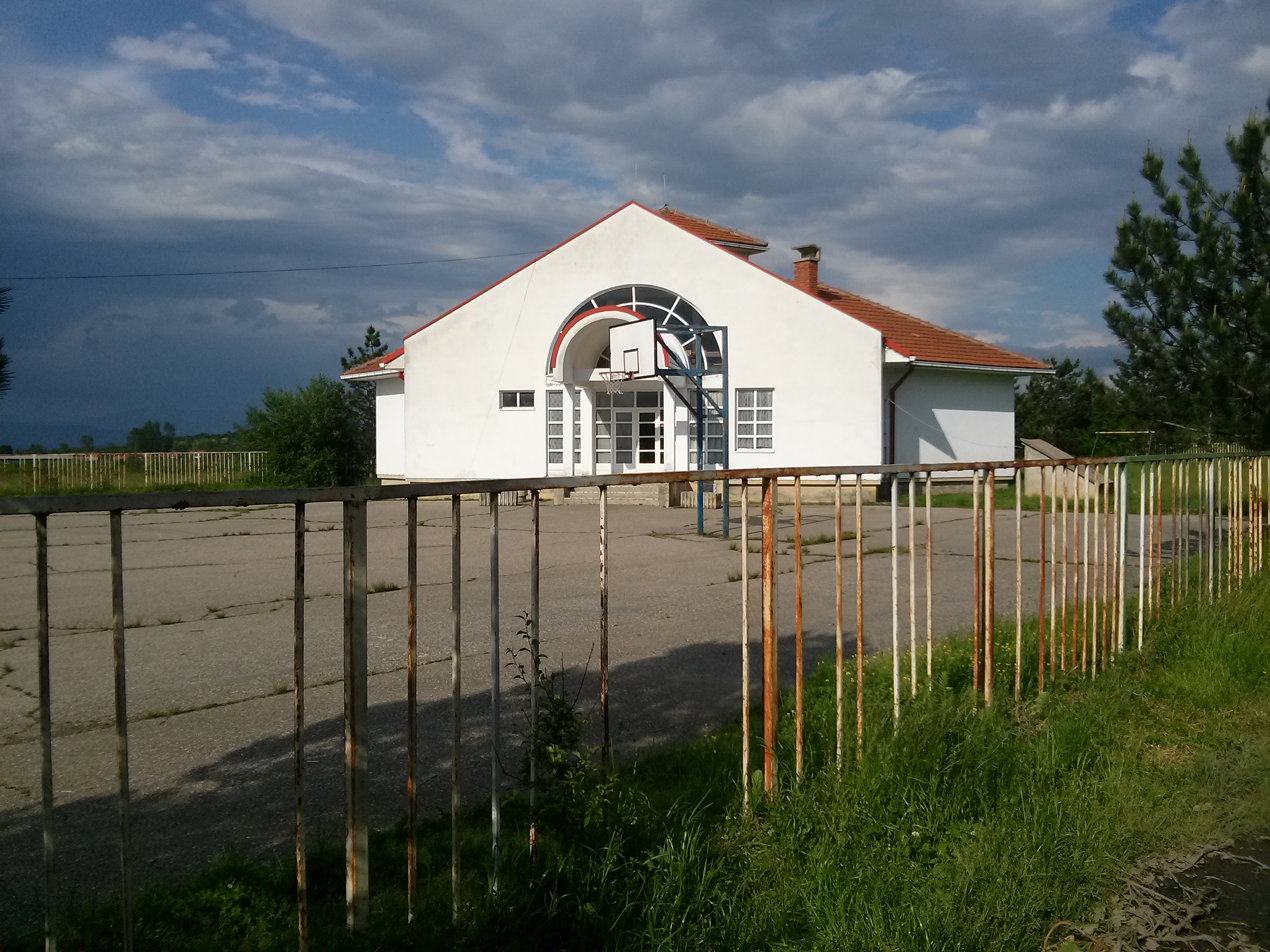
Primary school.

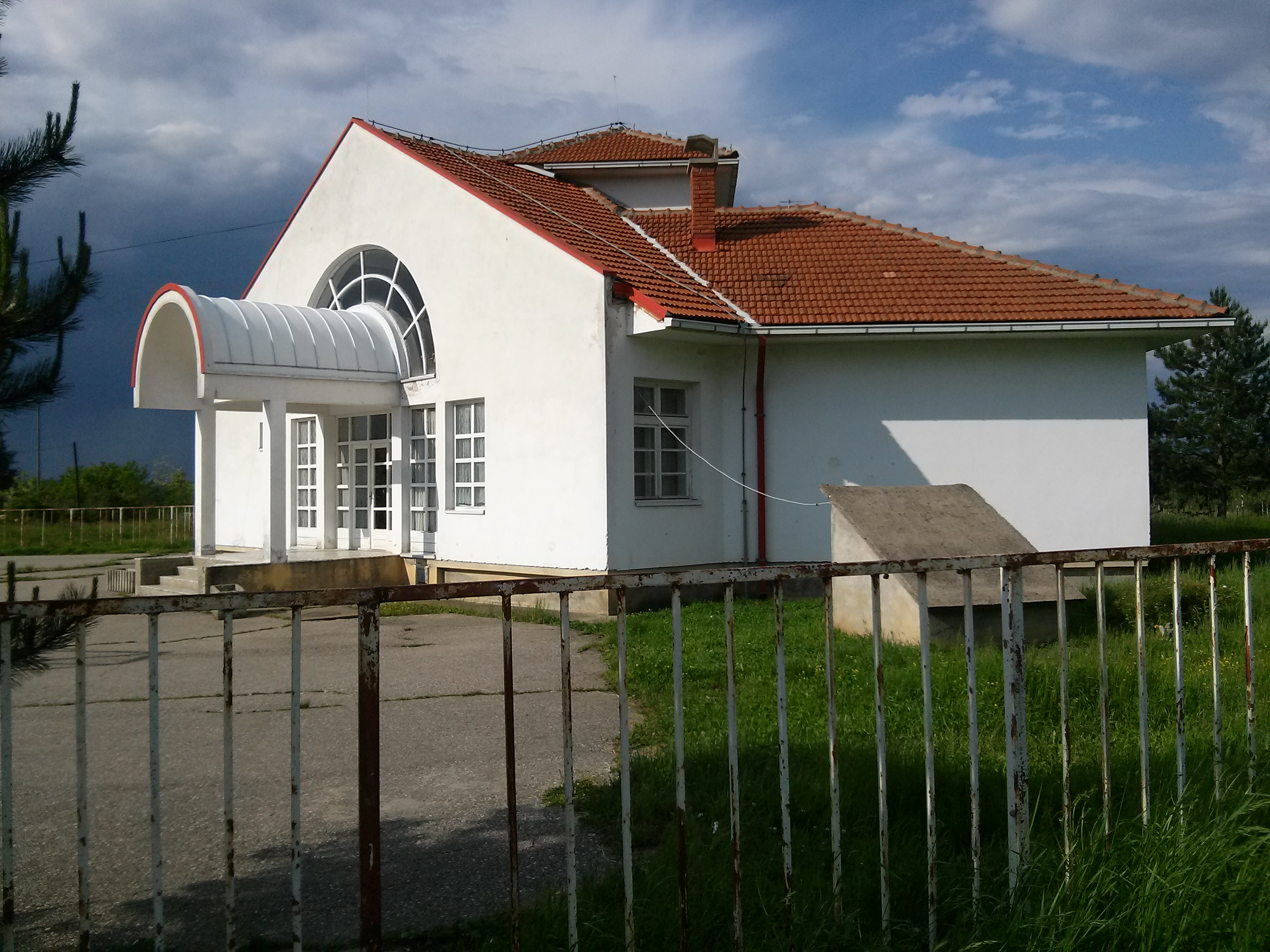
Primary school.

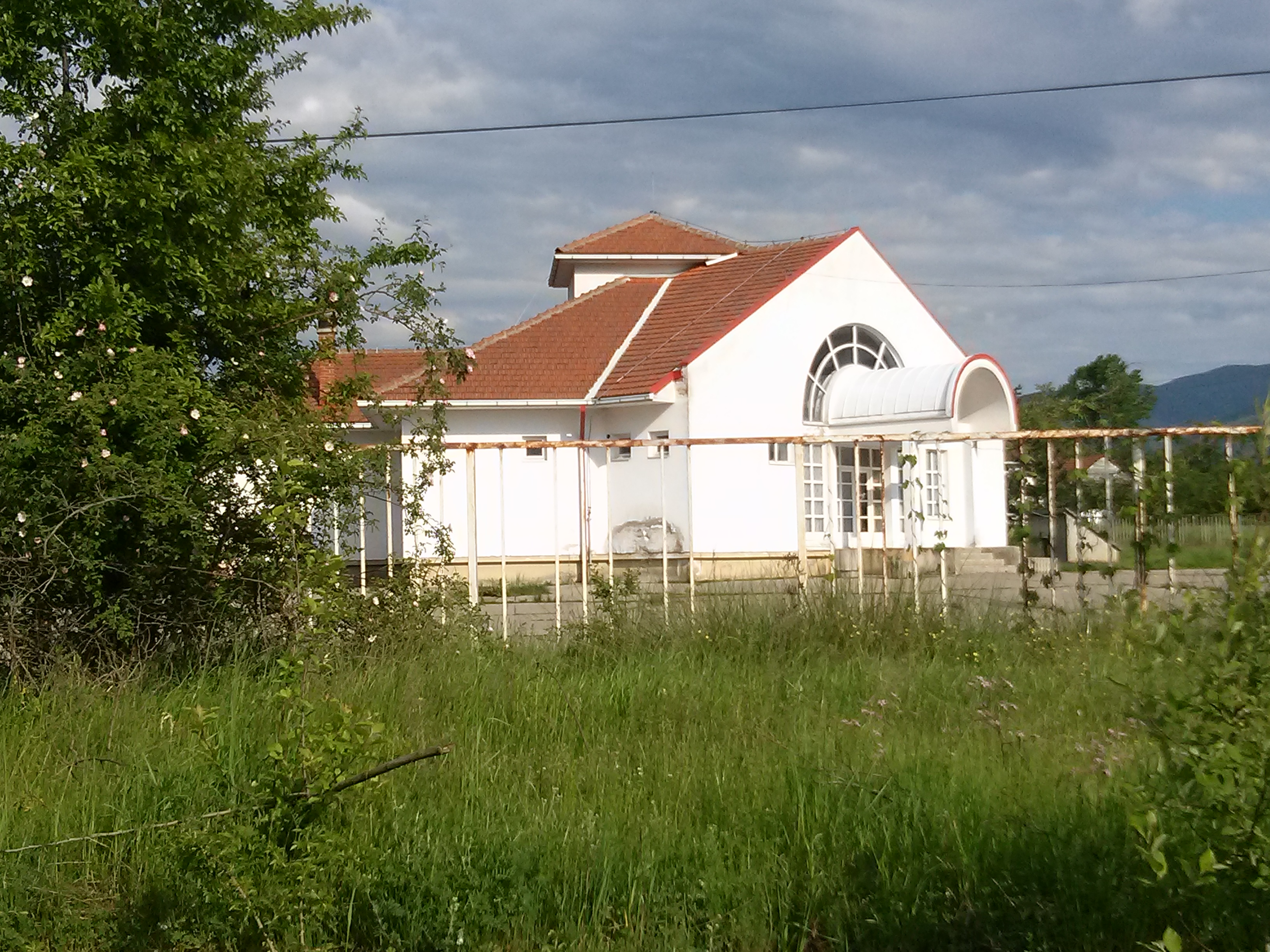
Primary school.

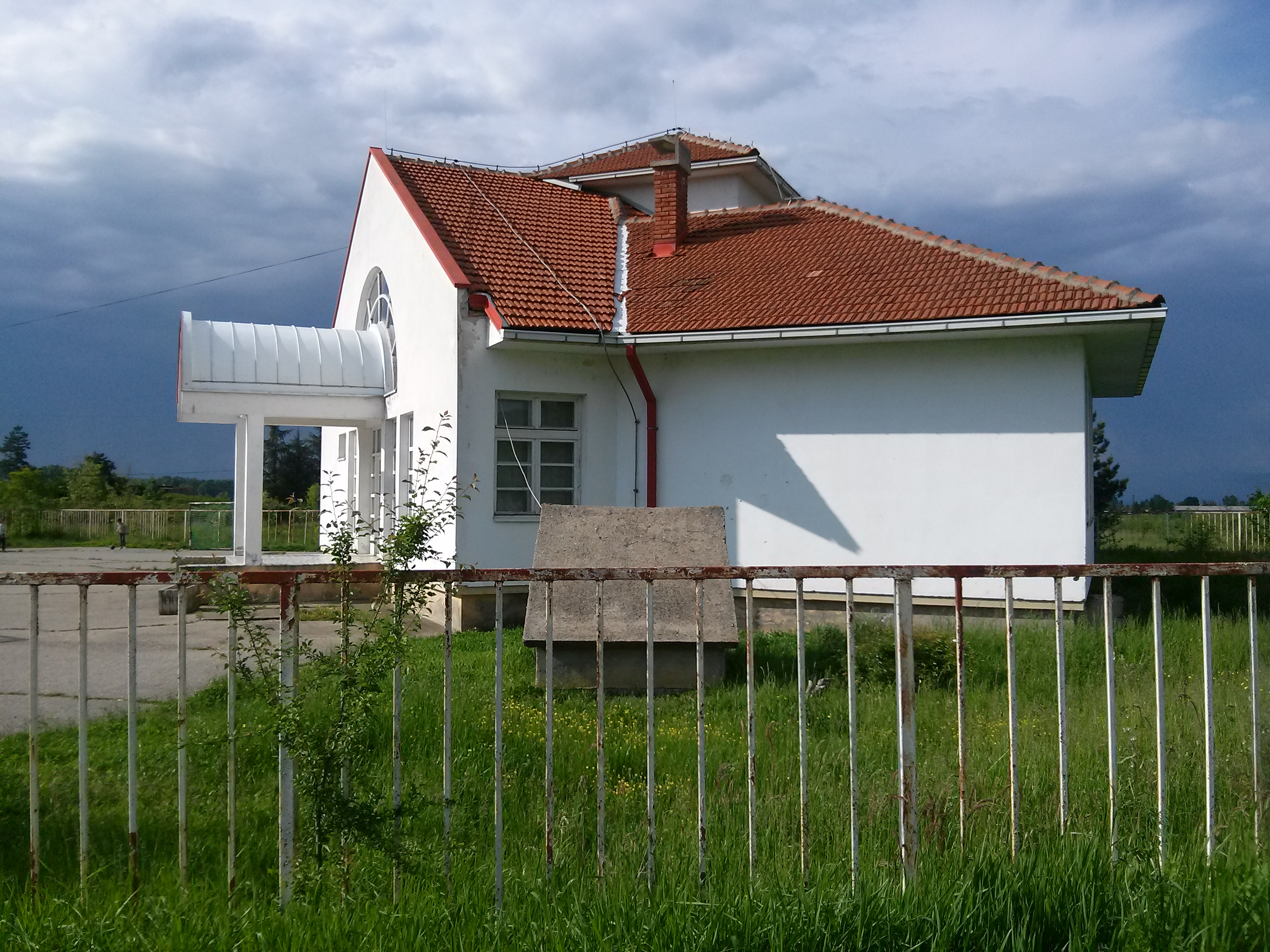
Primary school.

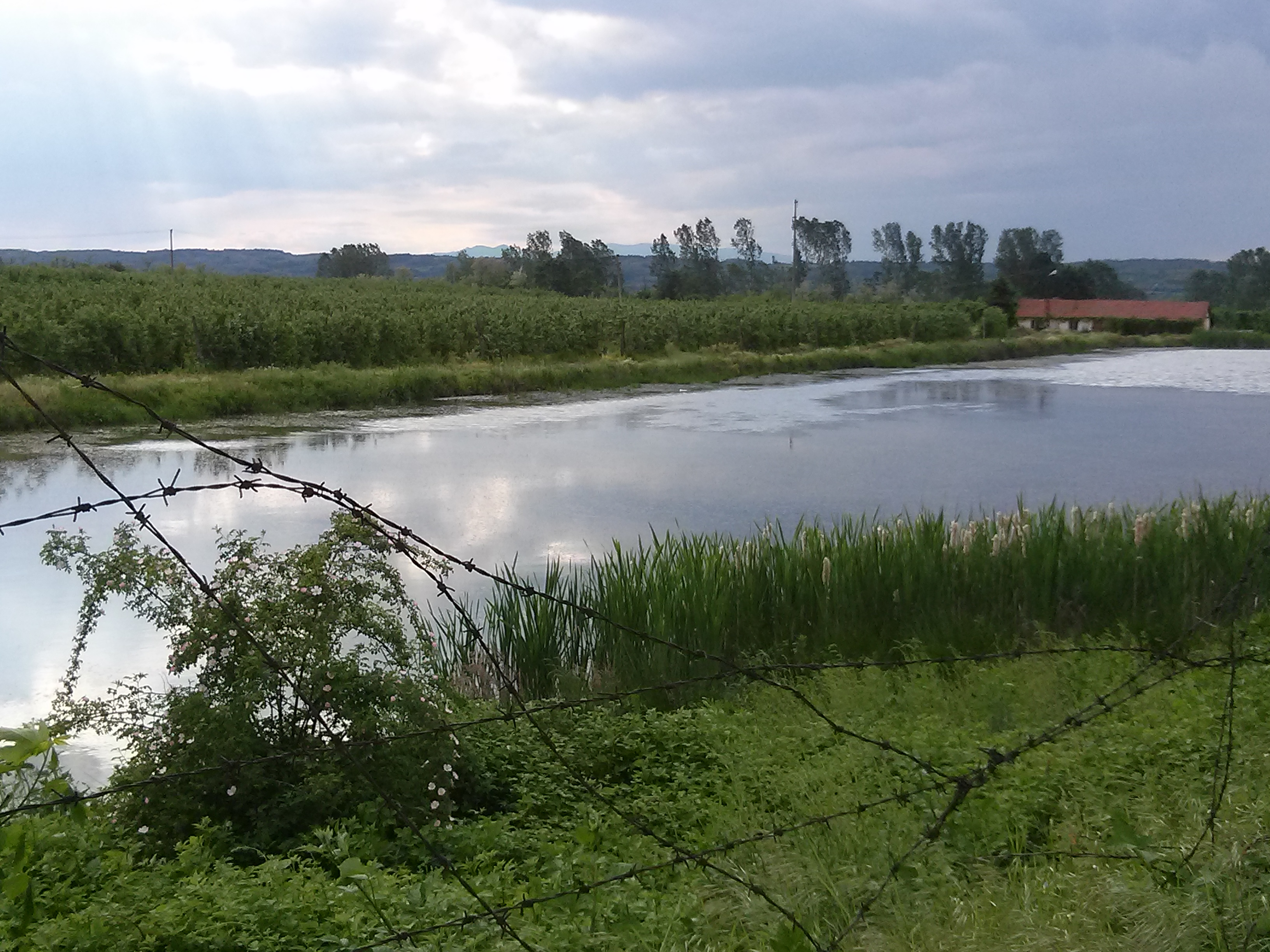
An artificial lake.
