= Beli (app) =

Social media app

- Original authors: Judy Thelen; Eliot Frost
- Release: 2021
- Platform: iOS 16.6 or later Android
- Available in: English
- Website: beliapp.com

Beli is an American restaurant-focused social media app founded in 2021 by Judy Thelen and Eliot Frost. The platform allows users to track restaurants they have visited, rate dining experiences, and receive personalized restaurant recommendations.

== History ==
Beli was founded in 2021 by Harvard Business School alumni Judy Thelen and Eliot Frost. The idea for the app originated from a Google Map the couple created to track restaurants they had visited together in New York City. The name "Beli" was derived from Frost's high school nickname.

The founders began developing the product in 2019. A beta version launched shortly after the onset of the COVID-19 pandemic, with early development funded through entrepreneurship grants from Harvard. Beli officially launched in the Apple App Store in June 2021.

The app initially gained traction in major U.S. cities including New York City, Chicago, and San Francisco. Its user base grew rapidly among Gen Z users, particularly in New York City. According to Thelen and Frost, roughly 80 percent of the Beli's users are under 35.

Thelen and Frost have declined to share data on daily active users. In November 2023, Beli closed a $5.3 million Series A round from Goodwater Capital. The company says it has raised $12 million as of June 2025, including from FirstMark Capital.

The app has over 75 million total global reviews across 30,000 cities globally as of September 2025

== Features ==
At its launch, Beli was invite-only, before opening to the general public. Users rank restaurants, bakeries, and other eateries on the Beli app, comparing individual establishments to others they have visited, as well as marking their favorite dishes and uploading photos of their meal. The app calculates two scores for the establishment based on the user's rank, one predicting how much the user liked the restaurant and the other stating how much a user's friends on Beli liked the restaurant. As users rate more restaurants, Beli's algorithm can connect it to other users with similar tastes and recommend particular places. Thelen has said that Beli has "gamified ranking." Profiles can be set to private or to public. Like Letterboxd for movies, users can tag people they visited a particular business with and leave reviews for the public. According to users, the app encourages members to "try new foods, cuisines, and neighborhoods". Thelen has argued that rather than a social media platform, Beli is a "social restaurant list-keeping app", but has also referred to Beli as a "social media company" in other interviews.

=== Leaderboard ===
Beli features both city-specific and a platform-wide leaderboard, which users can move up and down on depending on how many places they rank. Users can still invite others onto the app, upon which they are able to access increased functionality and increase their leaderboard ranking. Beli also encourages users to keep their "streak" alive.

The app has also launched a Dining Hall of Fame competition among 187 participating universities to find the "foodiest university". College students can also participate in college-based leaderboards.

=== Integration ===
Beli integrates with TikTok and Instagram, allowing users to add places from those platforms directly onto their "Want to Try" list on Beli, as well with certain online reservation-booking services, like OpenTable. Beli can also connect to college ID cards.

=== Beli Supper Club ===
After launching Beli, Thelen and Frost launched the Beli Supper Club, which The Wall Street Journal described as "an invite-only subscription service with a combination of in-person events and premium app features". The service requires a membership fee and is only available to users in New York City.

== Reception ==
Beli has been compared to other industry-specific social categorizing applications, including Strava, Yelp, Goodreads, and Letterboxd. Emily Lichty of Today.com wrote that Beli is the "ultimate gamification of grabbing grub". Journalists have focused on Beli's popularity amongst Gen Z users in particular. Sabrina Choudhary of Food Network referred to Beli as "Gen Z's Yelp," and Stephen Bradley wrote in Taste that the app "might be the most Gen Z–tailored dining-out resource yet".

The app has received some criticism from users for focusing on elite restaurants and generating "unmerited buzz", as well as focusing on preserving their streaks rather than a more genuine interest.
