= Belli, Bismil =

Village in Turkey

Belli
- Neighbourhood
- Location in Turkey
- Coordinates: 37.9125°N 40.8185°E
- Country: Turkey
- Province: Diyarbakır
- District: Bismil
- Population (2022): 220
- Time zone: UTC+3 (TRT)

Belli (Note: Also known as Ekkö.) is a neighbourhood in the municipality and district of Bismil, Diyarbakır Province in Turkey. Its population was 220 in 2022.

== History ==
Belli was historically inhabited by Syriac Orthodox Christians. It was located in the kaza (district) of Silvan in the Diyarbakır sanjak in the Diyarbekir vilayet in c. 1900. In 1914, it was populated by 100 Syriacs, according to the list presented to the Paris Peace Conference by the Assyro-Chaldean delegation. By 1914, it was situated in the Bafaya nahiyah (commune) of the kaza of Beşiri. No survivors of the Sayfo are attested from this area.

== Bibliography ==
- Gaunt, David (2006). Massacres, Resistance, Protectors: Muslim-Christian Relations in Eastern Anatolia during World War I. Gorgias Press.
- Jongerden, Joost; Verheij, Jelle, eds. (2012). Social Relations in Ottoman Diyarbekir, 1870-1915. Brill.
