= John Belli =

English-born American military officer

Major John Belli was an English-born American military officer who served as the Quartermaster General of the United States Army from 1792 to 1794. The first settler in Scioto County, Ohio, he lived there until his death in 1809. Belli purchased land from Larkin Smith in 1795.

== Personal life ==
Ruben Gold Thwaite described Belli as descending from a French father and Dutch mother. He was born in about 1760 and educated in England. Although he inherited estates in Holland, Belli emigrate to America and landed in Alexandria, Virginia in 1783, with letters of recommendation from John Jay.

Belli came to Scioto County, Ohio shortly after he purchased land from Smith in 1795, when he hired a man to clear the land, build a house, plant orchards, and perform other necessary tasks to make the land on a new farm. Belli married once, to Cynthia Harrison (cousin of future president William Henry Harrison) in 1800. They moved from Alexandria, Virginia to his farm in Turkey Creek, Scioto County. There he built a two story home, facing the Ohio River and named it 'Belvidere.' Belli would be known as a continental man of aristocratic demeanor, who never wore the pioneer's uniform of a hunter's shirt and leggings.

When Major Belli died in 1809, he left behind his widow, Cynthia and a young family.

== Military career ==
When Major Belli bought the land from Larkin Smith, he had just finished serving as Deputy General Quarter Master on the general staff of Major General Anthony Wayne's Legion. Major Belli played a critical role in supplying United States forces in the Northwest Indian War's climactic Battle at Fallen Timbers in 1794.
