= Johann Beeli von Belfort =

Grisons politician (1685–1742)

- Baptised: 7 October 1685
- Died: 28 September 1742
- Occupations: Politician; military officer
- Spouse: Elisabeth Beeli von Belfort

Johann Beeli von Belfort (also Johann Beeli; baptized 7 October 1685 – 28 September 1742) was a politician and military officer in the Three Leagues. In 1726 he was Landammann (chief magistrate) of the jurisdiction of Flims and an envoy of the Three Leagues for the renewal of the capitulation with Milan. He was vicari (judge) in the Valtellina from 1731 to 1733, and as Landrichter (head) of the Grey League in 1736–1737 he mediated in the Disentis tithe dispute.

== Biography ==
Johann Beeli von Belfort was a member of the Beeli family. He was the son of Christoffel, a Landammann, and Maria Cahenzli. He married Elisabeth Beeli von Belfort, daughter of Abundi, of Chur, and widow of a Schorsch of Splügen. He belonged to the Flims line of the family, which arose with Hans in the middle of the 16th century.

Beeli was a captain (Hauptmann). In 1726 he was Landammann of the jurisdiction (Gericht) of Flims and an envoy of the Three Leagues for the renewal of the capitulation with Milan (Mailänder Kapitulat). From 1731 to 1733 he was vicari in the Valtellina. As Landrichter of the Grey League in 1736–1737, he mediated in the Disentis tithe dispute (Disentiser Zehntenstreit).

== Bibliography ==
- A. Maissen, Die Landrichter des Grauen Bundes 1424–1797, 1990, 113–114
