= Beli, Lucknow =

Village in Uttar Pradesh, India

Beli
- Village
- Location in Uttar Pradesh, India Beli (India)
- Coordinates: 26.753738°N 81.074715°E
- Country: India
- State: Uttar Pradesh
- District: Lucknow

Area
  - Total: 2.588 km^{2} (0.999 sq mi)

Population (2011)
  - Total: 1,557
  - Density: 601.6/km^{2} (1,558/sq mi)

Languages
  - Official: Hindi
- Time zone: UTC+5:30 (IST)

Beli is a village in Gosainganj block of Lucknow district, Uttar Pradesh, India. As of 2011, its population is 1,557, in 312 households. It is the seat of a gram panchayat.
