= Boychinovtsi Municipality =

Boychinovtsi Municipality Община Бойчиновци
- Municipality
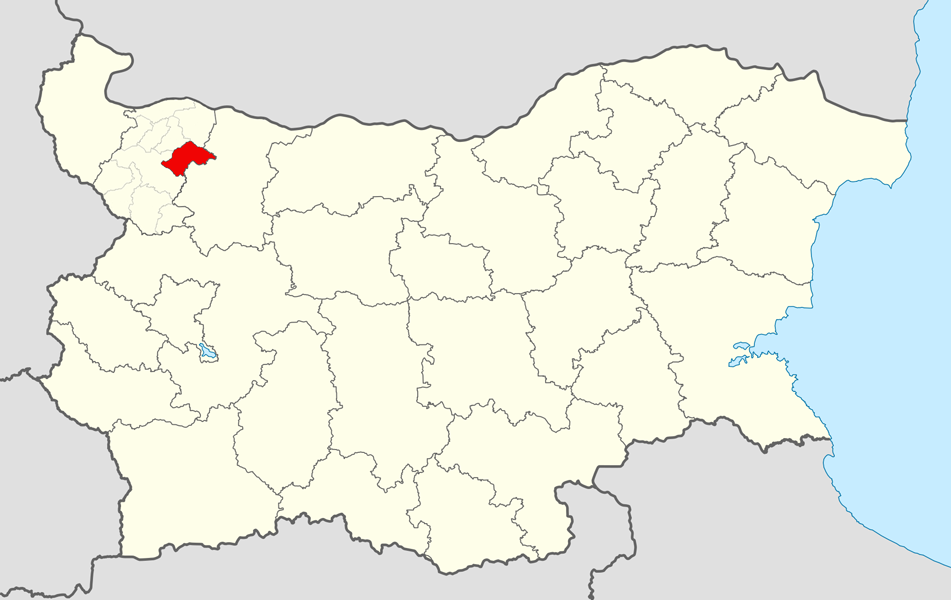
- Boychinovtsi Municipality within Bulgaria and Montana Province.
- Coordinates: 43°31′N 23°23′E
- Country: Bulgaria
- Province (Oblast): Montana
- Admin. centre (Obshtinski tsentar): Boychinovtsi

Area
  - Total: 307.32 km^{2} (118.66 sq mi)

Population (Census February 2011)
  - Total: 9,137
  - Density: 29.73/km^{2} (77.00/sq mi)
- Time zone: UTC+2 (EET)
  - Summer (DST): UTC+3 (EEST)

Boychinovtsi Municipality (Bulgarian: Община Бойчиновци) is a municipality (obshtina) in Montana Province, Northwestern Bulgaria, located in the transition between the Danubian Plain and the area of the so-called Fore-Balkan. It is named after its administrative centre – the town of Boychinovtsi.

The municipality embraces a territory of 307.32 km^{2} (118.66 sq mi) with a population of 9,137 inhabitants, as of February 2011.

Ogosta river, a right tributary of the Danube, flows through the area from southwest to northeast.

== Settlements ==
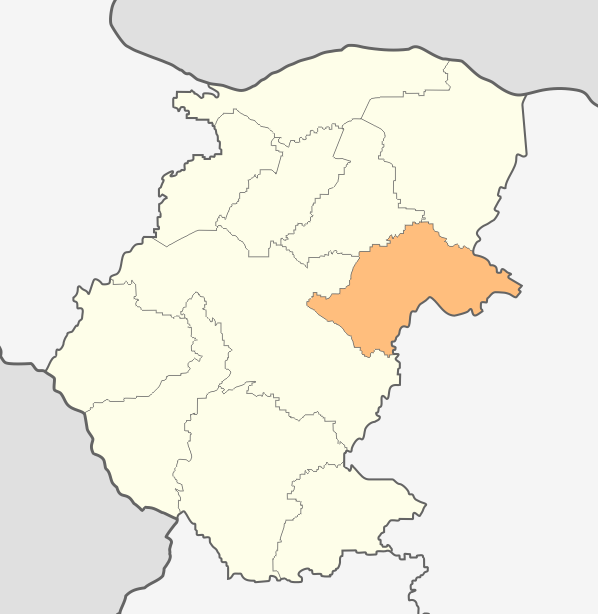
Boychinovtsi Municipality within Montana Province

Boychinovtsi Municipality includes the following 13 places (towns are shown in bold):

| Town/Village | Cyrillic | Population (December 2009) |
|---|---|---|
| **Boychinovtsi** | **Бойчиновци** | 1,648 |
| Beli Breg | Бели брег | 119 |
| Beli Brod | Бели брод | 247 |
| Erden | Ерден | 561 |
| Gromshin | Громшин | 865 |
| Kobilyak | Кобиляк | 339 |
| Lehchevo | Лехчево | 1,922 |
| Madan | Мадан | 861 |
| Marchevo | Мърчево | 905 |
| Ohrid | Охрид | 474 |
| Palilula | Палилула | 70 |
| Portitovtsi | Портитовци | 451 |
| Vladimirovo | Владимирово | 1,453 |
| Total | | 9,915 |

== Demography ==
The following table shows the change of the population during the last four decades. Since 1992 Boychinovtsi Municipality has comprised the former municipality of Lehchevo and the numbers in the table reflect this unification.

Boychinovtsi Municipality
| **Year** | 1975 | 1985 | 1992 | **2001** | 2005 | 2007 | 2009 | **2011** |
| **Population** | 12,848 | 10,070 | 14,242 | 12,258 | 11,062 | 10,466 | 9,915 | 9,137 |
Sources: Census 2001, Census 2011, „pop-stat.mashke.org“,

=== Religion ===
According to the latest Bulgarian census of 2011, the religious composition, among those who answered the optional question on religious identification, was the following:

Religious composition of Boychinovtsi Municipality
| Orthodox Christianity | 80.5% |
| Catholicism | 0.2% |
| Protestantism | 0.9% |
| Islam | 0.1% |
| No religion | 9.8% |
| Prefer not to answer, others and indefinable | 8.5% |

== See also ==
- Provinces of Bulgaria
- Municipalities of Bulgaria
- List of cities and towns in Bulgaria
