= Beli Kamen, Prokuplje =

Beli Kamen Бели Камен (Serbian)
- Village
- Location within Serbia
- Coordinates: 43°08′56″N 21°34′14″E
- Country: Serbia
- District: Toplica District
- Municipality: Prokuplje

Population (2002)
  - Total: 27
- Time zone: UTC+1 (CET)
  - Summer (DST): UTC+2 (CEST)

Beli Kamen is a village in the municipality of Prokuplje, Serbia. According to the 2002 census, the village has a population of 27 people.
