= Girolamo Belloni =

Italian marquis, banker and economist

- Born: 1 April 1688; Codogno, Duchy of Milan
- Died: 5 July 1760 (aged 72); Rome, Papal States
- Occupations: Banker; Economist
- Spouse: Agnese Ulci
- Children: Francesco
- Parent(s): Antonio Belloni and Lucrezia Belloni (née Tonana)

Academic work
- School or tradition: Mercantilism; Italian Enlightenment
- Influenced: René Louis de Voyer de Paulmy, Marquis of Argenson; Antoine Le Camus; Anders Nordencrantz; James Steuart

Girolamo Belloni (1 April 1688 – 5 July 1760) was an Italian marquis, banker and economist of the Age of the Enlightenment. He was respected among politicians and economists of his time. Belloni's most famous work is De commercio dissertatio (English: A dissertation on Trade), a mercantilist treatise describing the ways in which a state must regulate its economy for maximum benefit. Belloni is considered to be one of the first theorists of the nobility of commerce.

== Early life ==
Belloni was born on 1 April 1688 in Codogno, a small city belonging to the province of Lodi in Lombardy. He was born to the wealthy family of merchants and bankers. Belloni's family has acquired prestige and wealth in various regions of Italy and Spain thanks to agriculture and trade. Belloni had been highly influenced by his ambitious uncle Giovanangelo. Belloni lived for some time in Bologna where he gained experience and skills in business.

== Later years ==
After Giovanangelo's death, his possessions were divided among the relatives and Belloni inherited the banking house in Rome (with open credits in Europe, America and India).

Belloni was appointed to work in the Apostolic Chamber in 1730. He accepted the offer as he has ideas and aimed for the institutional changes to the customs in the state apparatus. During the next years, Belloni also worked with financial organisations. Belloni's time in Rome spurred writing a series of economic memoirs which will influence the view of the economics of the 18th century. In Rome, Belloni would have overlapped with Lione Pascoli (1674-1744), also a writer of a treatise on policy, including economics, titled Testamento Politico d'un Academico Fiorentino (written 1723, published 1733).

Thanks to his work experience and various connections with politicians across Europe, Belloni had an opportunity to consult and develop on his economic principles presented in his book, "The Treaty of Commerce".

Belloni was concerned about the commerce system of the state and the government transparency in terms of managing the economy. He was not afraid of speaking up his mind and thus was often critiqued by the masses. However, Belloni was still one of the most influential people in 18th century Italy. Daniello Concina would call Belloni "the most celebrated Roman banker".

== Legacy ==
=== De commercio dissertatio (1750) ===
A dissertation on trade or De commercio dissertatio was the peak of Belloni's career. The book became an international best-seller. It went through seventeen editions and was translated into seven languages, including Latin, German, English, French and Russian. Belloni was appointed Marquis by the Pope Benedict XIV in recognition of his outstanding contributions to the field of economics.

The book describes how the State must regulate the economy in order to get maximum profit by implying restrictions on the export of money. The author also wanted to bring the light on how the State regulations of trade and finance may be successful or unsuccessful for the economy. Belloni covered four fundamental phenomenons in the book. They are the nature and power of commerce, the nature of money, the proportion between gold and silver in trade. In the book, he favoured the national policy of trade and its nobility (the notion that will later be known as "nobiltà commerciale" or commercial nobility).

In his book Belloni tried to draw the line between theory and real-life economy. Belloni argued that the extraordinary export of money from the country cause imbalance equal to the one caused by war and thus must be heavily regulated by the state. The author also referred to the terms of "active trade" and "passive trade" to form his theory of healthy commerce. "Active" international trade consists of the national goods exported from the state and the "passive" international trade consist of the imported foreign goods. Belloni argued for the tariff system to be an important instrument of the State. Belloni also offered the right "proportion" of the exchange rates for the gold and silver: 15-ounce silver for 1 gold ounce.

One more argument suggested was that the wealth of the nation directly depends on the policies and regulations implied by the state in the field of international trade and national industrial competitiveness. Thus, questioning the true value of money for the economy, Belloni claimed it was a "misura comune" that should not be the reason for the state failure but in the opposite used to measure the value of things exchanged with each other. He also believed in the ability and rightfulness of the elites to intervene in the development of the certain state mechanisms (such as setting taxes and tariffs for imported raw materials). However, Belloni also admitted the need for the government transparency and the overall simplification of the economic system.

== Death ==
Belloni died on 5 July 1760 in Rome. He had a son who inherited Belloni's fortunes after his death (including his “signature” banking house in Rome).

== Bibliography ==
- Caracciolo, Alberto (1965). "BELLONI, Girolamo"". Dizionario Biografico degli Italiani (in Italian). Vol. 7: Bartolucci–Bellotto. Rome: Istituto dell'Enciclopedia Italiana. ISBN 978-88-12-00032-6.
- Reinert, Sophus A. (2012). "Belloni, Girolamo". Il Contributo italiano alla storia del Pensiero: Economia. Rome: Istituto dell'Enciclopedia Italiana. pp. 271–274.
