= Gino Belloni =

Italian fencer (1884–1924)

Personal information
- Born: 20 September 1884 Cremona, Italy
- Died: 22 January 1924 (aged 39)

Sport
- Sport: Fencing

Gino Belloni (20 September 1884 – 22 January 1924) was an Italian fencer. He competed in the team sabre event at the 1912 Summer Olympics.
