= Gromshin =

Gromshin Громшин
- Village
- Location within Bulgaria
- Coordinates: 43°31′N 23°30′E
- Country: Bulgaria
- Province: Montana Province
- Municipality: Boychinovtsi
- Time zone: UTC+2 (EET)
  - Summer (DST): UTC+3 (EEST)

Gromshin is a village in Boychinovtsi Municipality, Montana Province, Bulgaria.
