= Nikolaus Beeli von Belfort =

Grisons bailiff (c. 1450 – after 1516)

- Born: c. 1450 probably Brienz
- Died: after 1516 probably Davos
- Occupations: Bailiff; politician; military officer
- Father: Ulrich Beeli
- Relatives: Conradin Beeli von Belfort (brother)

Nikolaus Beeli von Belfort (also Nikolaus Beeli; c. 1450 – after 1516) was an Austrian bailiff and a Landammann (chief magistrate) of Davos. He was bailiff (Vogt) from 1483 to 1510, until 1499 at Belfort Castle and later at Alvaneu, and in 1486 he was enfeoffed with the jurisdictions of Davos, Klosters and Lenz. He was Landammann of Davos from 1500 to 1504 and a captain in the Valtellina campaigns.

== Biography ==
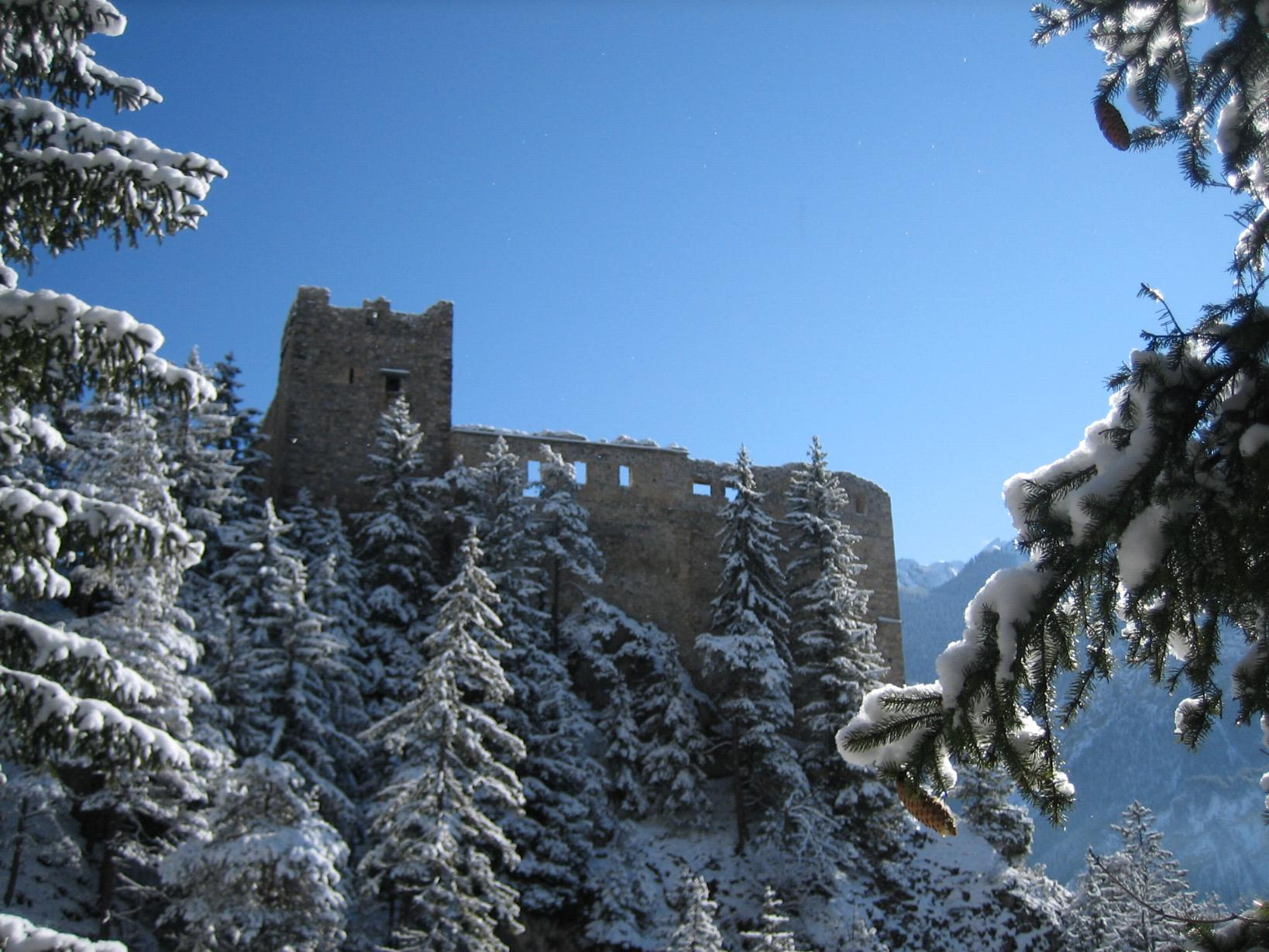
Ruins of Belfort Castle, Beeli's seat as bailiff until its destruction in 1499

Nikolaus Beeli von Belfort was a member of the Beeli family. He was probably born in Brienz. He was the son of Ulrich, bailiff (Vogt) of Belfort, and the brother of Conradin.

From 1483 to 1510 Beeli was the Austrian bailiff, until 1499 at Belfort Castle, which was destroyed in the Swabian War, and later at Alvaneu. In 1486 Sigismund of Austria enfeoffed him with the jurisdictions (Gerichte) of Davos, Klosters and Lenz. He was formally replaced in 1498, but only on paper. From 1500 to 1504 he was Landammann of Davos. He was a captain (Hauptmann) in the Valtellina campaigns (Veltlinerzüge) and died after 1516, probably in Davos.

Beeli made his mark as a military leader in the Bormio campaign (Wormserzug) of 1486.

== Bibliography ==
- O. P. Clavadetscher, W. Meyer, Das Burgenbuch von Graubünden, 1984, 56
