= Beli Breg, Krško =

Beli Breg
- Location in Slovenia
- Coordinates: 45°55′38″N 15°28′42″E
- Country: Slovenia
- Traditional region: Lower Carniola
- Statistical region: Lower Sava
- Municipality: Krško
- Elevation: 164 m (538 ft)

Beli Breg (Slovene pronunciation: [ˈbeːli ˈbɾeːk]) is a former settlement in the Municipality of Krško in northeastern Slovenia. It is now part of the village of Leskovec pri Krškem. The area is part of the traditional region of Lower Carniola. The municipality is now included in the Lower Sava Statistical Region.

== Geography ==
Beli Breg stands at a crossroads in the Krško Plain about 2 kilometers (1.2 mi) south of Leskovec pri Krškem along the road to Drnovo.

== History ==
Beli Breg was annexed by Leskovec pri Krškem in 1952, ending its existence as an independent settlement.
