= Stelio Belloni =

Uruguayan sculptor (1920–1989)

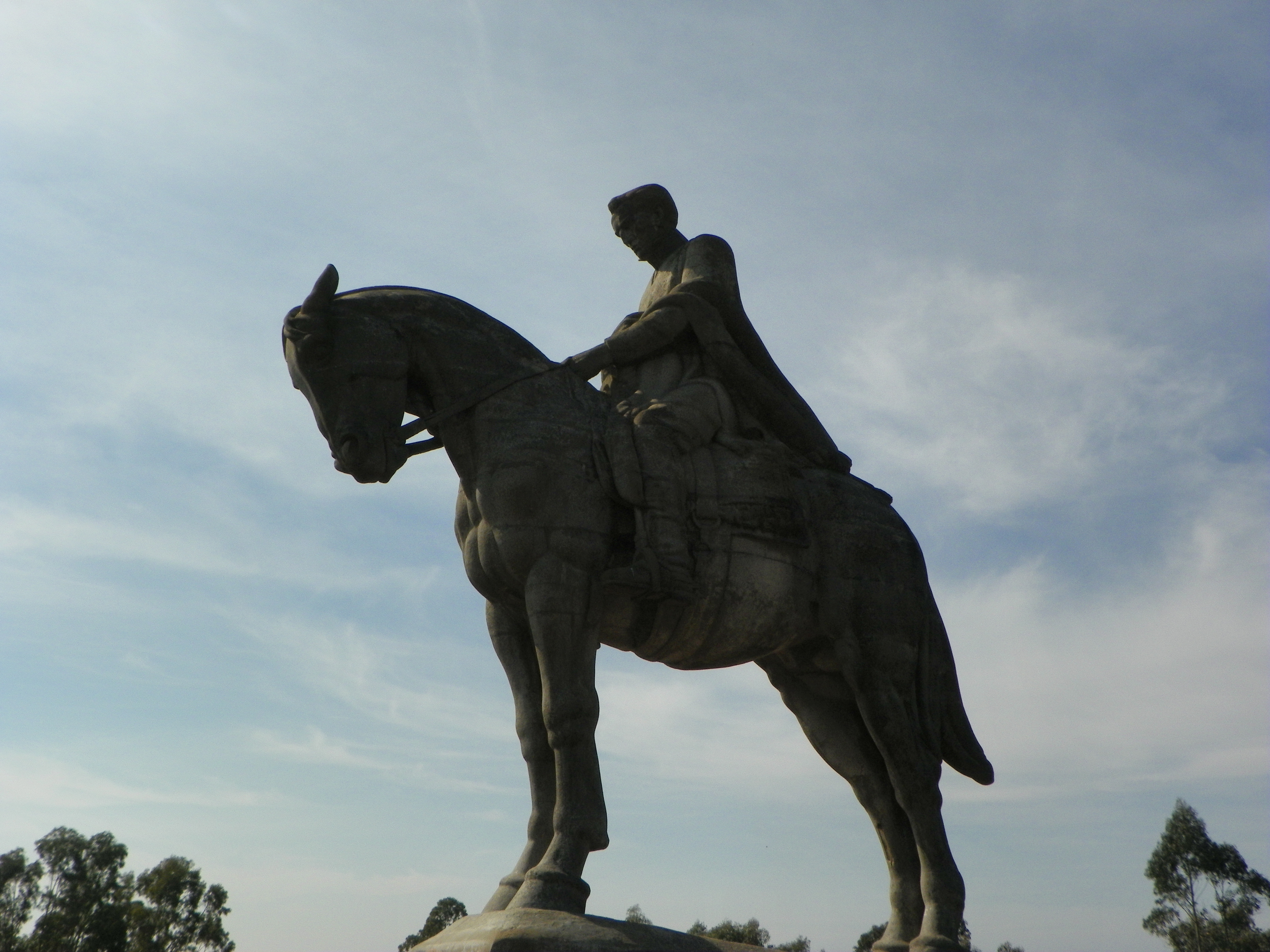
Horseback statue of José Artigas in Minas.

Stelio Belloni (Montevideo, 23 August 1920 - 9 September 1989) was a Uruguayan sculptor.

He was son of the notable Realist sculptor José Belloni.

== Selected works ==
- Guillermo Cuadri (Santos Garrido). Minas (1956).
- Woman with Pitcher. Piedra Alta Park, Florida.
- Doors of the Cathedral of Florida.
- Avente Haedo, Minas.
- Atilio Narancio, Estadio Centenario, Montevideo.
- José Gervasio Artigas (horseback statue, 12 m tall), Minas, Lavalleja.
- El Entrevero (with José Belloni), Montevideo.
