= Beeli family =

Aristocratic family of Davos, Grisons

The Beeli family (also Beeli von Belfort) is an aristocratic family of the Grisons from Davos. A Walser family, it probably came to Davos in the 13th century. In 1436 Ulrich Beeli, the Ammann (chief magistrate) of Davos, was one of the founders of the League of the Ten Jurisdictions, and until the middle of the 16th century the Beeli dominated the office of Ammann of Davos, whose holder was at the same time head of the League. In 1441 Belfort Castle was pledged to Ulrich, and residence there gave the family the predicate von Belfort. With lines in Chur, Fideris and Flims, the family was present in all of the Three Leagues. Members of the family live in Flims, Thusis and Chur, among other places.

== History ==
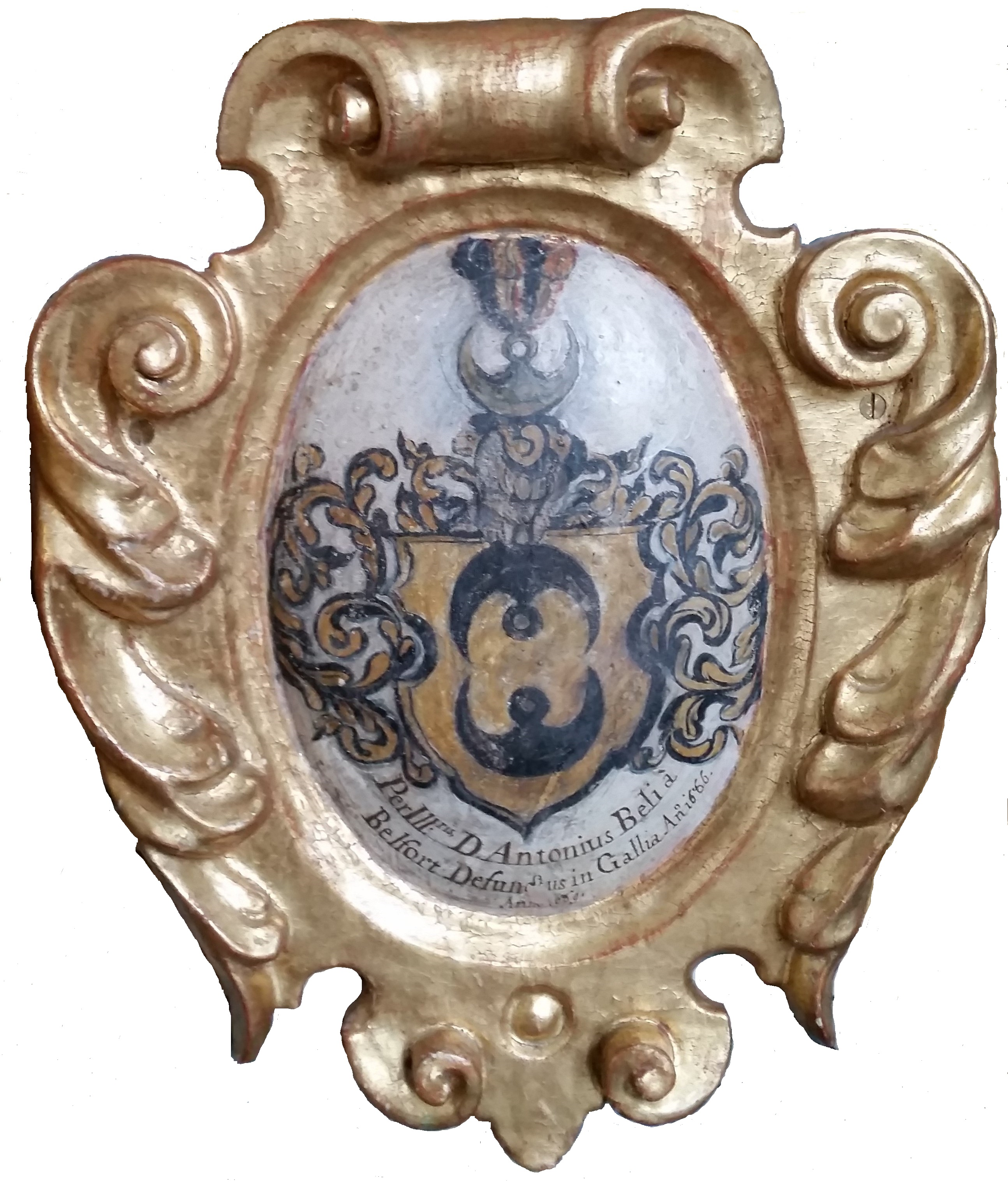
Beeli coat of arms on the Rosary altar of the church of St. Donatus in Zorten

The Beeli, a Walser family, probably came to Davos in the course of the Walser colonization in the 13th century. In 1436 Ulrich Beeli, as Ammann of Davos with his own seal, was one of the founders of the League of the Ten Jurisdictions. Because Davos was fixed as the meeting place of the League's assembly (Bundstag), the Ammann of Davos was at the same time head of the League. Until the middle of the 16th century the Beeli dominated these offices. Their extensive landholdings formed their material base. The building of the first stone houses and suitable marriages with leading families from all of the Three Leagues increased their standing and influence.

In 1441 Belfort Castle was pledged to Ulrich, who was bailiff (Vogt) there for 40 years. Residence at the castle gave the family the predicate von Belfort, which continued to be used after the castle was destroyed in 1499. The bailiff at that time, Nikolaus, appears to have moved his seat to the village of Alvaneu. Because of their political offices, the Beeli often served as envoys and judges. Some made their mark as military leaders, such as Nikolaus in the Bormio campaign (Wormserzug) of 1486 and Conradin in the conquest of the Valtellina in 1512.

Wilhelm, a brother of Nikolaus and Conradin, was a physician and founded the Chur line, which produced several physicians and, with Gabriel, provided the president (Bundspräsident) of the League of God's House for many years in the 17th century. In the middle of the 16th century the Fideris line arose with Batt (Pankraz), and at the same time the Flims line with Hans, to which Johann belonged, so that the family was present in all of the Three Leagues. Through Georg and his namesake Georg, among others, the family also held offices in the Valtellina.

With the appointment of an Austrian bailiff (Landvogt) at Castels in the Prättigau, who was responsible for all eight jurisdictions, the influence of the Beeli in the League of the Ten Jurisdictions declined. In 1523 the government in Innsbruck did not grant a request by the younger Ulrich to be given this bailiwick. Only in 1595 did the second Georg obtain the office, at a time when the Beeli family had already passed the peak of its power. In Davos the leadership had passed to the Buol, Guler and Sprecher families.

The family produced several officers in the 17th and 18th centuries, among them a Conradin and another Conradin. In 1865–1866 Hans Peter was a member of the cantonal government (Regierungsrat) of the Grisons. In Davos, Marie (1851–1950) carried out extensive social work. Members of the family live in Flims, Thusis and Chur, among other places.

== Bibliography ==
- Schweizerisches Geschlechterbuch, 2, 33–46
- P. Gillardon, Geschichte des Zehngerichtenbundes, 1936
- A. von Sprecher, "Davoser Chronik von Florian und Fortunat von Sprecher", in Bündner Monatsblatt, 1953, 314–315
- P. E. Grimm, Die Anfänge der Bündner Aristokratie im 15. und 16. Jahrhundert, 1981
- H. Simmen, "Ein Zweig der Beeli von Belfort in Fideris", in Bündner Monatsblatt, 1994, 247–258

=== Archives ===
- Records and chronicle of the Beeli family, Staatsarchiv Graubünden, Chur
