= Humberto Belli =

Nicaraguan writer and Minister of Education

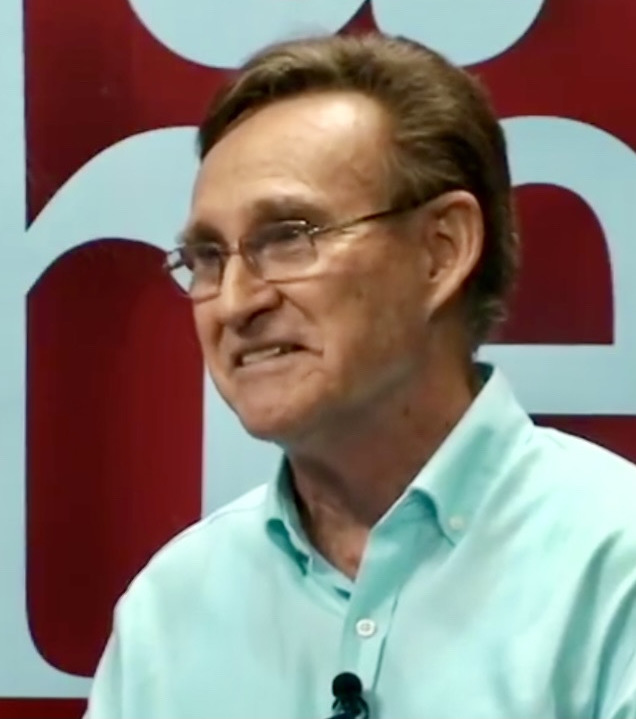
- Belli in 2018
- Born: September 7, 1945 (age 81)
- Education: Central American University; University of Madrid; University of Pennsylvania
- Title: Minister of Education
- Relatives: Gioconda Belli (sister)

Humberto Belli Pereira (born September 7, 1945) is a Nicaraguan politician and writer. The former Minister of Education in Nicaragua during the presidency of conservative Violeta Chamorro, Belli is also the author of five books.

== Biography ==
Humberto Belli Pereira was born September 7, 1945, in Managua) to Humberto Belli Zapata and Gloria Pereira Salazar. His sister is the author and former Sandinista revolutionary Gioconda Belli.

Humberto Belli was educated at the Central American University, the University of Madrid, and University of Pennsylvania, where he studied sociology. He joined the Sandinista student group, the Revolutionary Student Front (FER) in 1965, but broke with the FSLN and Marxism in 1975 while continuing to oppose the Somoza rule.

He converted to Catholicism in 1977 and is a member of Opus Dei. He is the author of Breaking Faith: The Sandinista Revolution and its Impact on Freedom and Christian Faith in Nicaragua (1984; also released as Christians Under Fire) and Buscando La Tierra Prometida, Historia de Nicaragua 1492-2019 (Searching for the Promised Land, 2019). He is on the editorial board of La Prensa.

Belli became Minister of Education in Nicaragua during the presidency of conservative Violeta Barrios de Chamorro and also worked in the administration of her successor, Arnoldo Alemán of the Constitutionalist Liberal Party.

He is a critic of the FSLN, alleging fraud in the 2011 Nicaraguan general election (particularly as regards the National Assembly composition) and harshly criticizing his once-close friend of Cardinal Miguel Obando y Bravo for Obando y Bravo’s close relationship with the FSLN. In a 2012 interview, Belli said, “I regret that a member of the Church who should distance himself from power and especially from powers that disrespect the Constitution and commit fraud, is continually blessing it.”

In June 2021, Bellí was among a wave of arrest warrants for civic figures that began with four opposition pre-candidates for president in the November general election. On June 16, Bellí and 12 other former directors of Nicaraguan Foundation for Economic and Social Development (FUNIDES) had their bank accounts frozen in an investigation for alleged violations by the Foundation of the controversial Law 1040, the “Law on the Regulation of Foreign Agents”. The next day, arrest warrants were issued for two of them—Bellí and Gerardo José Baltodano Cantarero—for allegedly failing to respond to a summons. In 2023, Humberto Belli was stripped of his Nicaraguan citizenship.

== Works ==
- Belli Pereira, Humberto (1977). Un ensayo de interpretación sobre las luchas políticas nicaragüenses: ponencia (in Spanish). Centro de Investigaciones Sociales Nicaragüenses.
- Belli Pereira, Humberto (1983). Persecution of Protestants in Nicaragua: The Neglected Story.
- Belli, Humberto (1984). Christians Under Fire. Instituto Puebla. OCLC 11372504.
- Belli, Humberto; Nash, Ronald H. (1992). Beyond Liberation Theology. Academic Renewal Press. ISBN 978-0-7880-9920-5.
- Buscando La Tierra Prometida, Historia de Nicaragua 1492-2019 (2019).
