= Pierre Belly =

Pierre Belly (August 17, 1738 – June 17, 1814) was a Louisiana planter, lawyer and judge. Originally a native of France, it's believed Belly arrived in Louisiana in 1774, where he received his first tract of land-for 3,756 acres in the form of a land grant from the Spanish colonial government. Pierre also received five more land grants (three from the Spanish government and two from the US government) totalling about 4,898 acres.

Pierre had an extensive and successful military career serving as an officer with the Spanish colonial militia and participated in the Galvez expedition against the British in 1779 commanding a force of 120 men. He retired from the militia in 1792, but later took up arms against the British alongside his son-in-law in the defense of New Orleans during the war of 1812. In 1805, Pierre also served as one of the first officials appointed to local government in Iberville Parish, and between 1805 and 1807 he served as a civil judge for the parish.

== Early life and career ==
Pierre Belly was born 17 August 1738 at Mormon, France (now Maurenon) on his family's estate in Eyrans, a small village near Blaye, north of Bordeaux. He was the son of Jean Belly, a textile merchant, who was the son of Jean Belly and Renee Billoneau, and Valerie Goyer de la Rochette, a daughter of Pierre Goyer de la Rochette and Francoise Videau. Valerie's father, Pierre Goyer de la Rochette, was a royal engineer who also resided in Eyrans.

Pierre's father founded a textile firm in 1729 in partnership with Pierre de Saint Aigan. Jean, the eldest son, later inherited the family estate. Upon Jean's death in 1753, Valerie and their four minor children, Etienne, Pierre, Jean-Baptiste and Marguerite were left with many debts. Valerie, after many court appearances, received the family estate of Mornon and renounced all claim to the textile business.

Pierre (aka Peter) and Pedro, received several large Spanish land grants, the first being 3,756 acres in the then Iberville District, the Baltimore Tract. This land grant lies in what is now known as the White Castle area and encompasses parts of White Castle and Texas plantations.

Though primarily a planter, he also supplied lumber to the Spanish colonial government. In 1786, Pierre and business partner Nicholas de Verbois agreed to supply masts and spars to the King of Spain. Later in life Pierre was among the first officials appointed for Iberville Parish and served as a civil judge from 1805 to 1807.

== Family and Descendants ==
In August 1779, Pierre received a shipment of 30 slaves from his agent in Jamaica, including Marie Rose (b 1768 or 1769 - August 14, 1828). (She was referred to as "Rosa" in Spanish records of that time and may have been Nago or Yoruba in origin.) Her arrival in Louisiana on board the ship La Golondrina (The Swallow) marked the beginning of a long relationship with Pierre that lasted nearly 35 years and produced six daughters, Rosalie (b 1785), Marie Marguerite Antoinette (b 1786), Marie Genevieve (b 1788), Marie Francoise Manette (b 1799), Valerie Octavine (b 1802), Heloise Marguerite (b 1808).

Pierre and Rose lived as husband and wife using the courts to make their relationship to one another public and official and proclaim their children as their own. Pierre and Rose were able to use these legal means to shape a story about their family insisting the courts recognize them as a lawful family though they were unable to marry because the law forbade marriage between blacks and whites. They affirmed their "marriage" in legal documents in various ways. In several legal documents involving Rose some were initiated by Pierre and others initiated by Rose, Pierre and Rose gave her name as "Rose Belly" or "commonly called Rose Belly" (or Rosa in Spanish records showing her manumission).

When Pierre transferred property to Rose and their daughters, he signified their ties to one another, strengthened those bonds through shared ownership, and made those connections official and public before the courts. Rose likely enjoyed considerable independence; she was not dependent on Pierre for her livelihood or the livelihood of her daughters. Through property ownership and the independence it provided her, Rose (like other free black and Creole women in the region) exercised a civic personality and claimed space for herself. Pierre and Rose also ensured that their daughters' futures were secure by making good matches for them with other free people of color (les gens de couleur libres). As an example, their daughter, Marie Genevieve Belly, married Cyprian Ricard, the son of wealthy planter Antoine Ricard de Rieutord and his "wife" Marianne. When Cyprian died, Marie Genevieve and her children were left with a sizeable estate, including over 150 slaves. Another daughter, Rosalie Belly, married Antoine Dubuclet, a wealthy planter who also owned over 70 slaves. Their son, Antoine Jr., served as a Louisiana Secretary of Treasury during Reconstruction. Pierre and Rose's other daughters made good matches in other families of free people of color, with Marie Marguerite Antoinette also marrying into the Ricard family; daughter Marie Francoise Manette marrying into the Honore family; daughter Heloise Marguerite marrying into the Deslondes family; and daughter Valerie Octavine marrying into the Verret family.

== Death and legacy ==
At the time of Pierre’s death in 1814 his holdings were in excess of 8,500 acres (five individual plantations were included). When Pierre died in 1814 he was the wealthiest planter and largest land and slave owner in Iberville Parish. Pierre and Rose were buried on their plantation. The remains were later removed to a large family tomb in the St. Raphael Cemetery at Bayou Goula, Iberville Parish, Louisiana, built in 1860 by Pierre Cyprien Ricard, their grandson, and lying some miles upriver from their original home. The tomb can still be seen today, a bit battered, but nonetheless impressive. Pierre and Rose's love story is famous in the countryside there.
