= José Belloni =

Uruguayan sculptor

- Born: José Belloni; September 12, 1882; Uruguay
- Died: November 28, 1965 (aged 83)
- Occupations: sculptor, artist

José Belloni (September 12, 1882 – November 28, 1965) was a Uruguayan sculptor of the Realist school.

== Biography ==
José Belloni was born in Montevideo, in 1882; his father was Swiss from Ticino, and his mother Basque from Spain. His family returned to Europe in 1890, however, and the Bellonis settled in Lugano, Switzerland. He took an early interest in sculpture, and was mentored by Luis Vasseli, earning a scholarship that briefly took him to Uruguay, in 1899. He later enrolled in the Munich Academy, and participated in numerous exhibitions throughout Europe.

Returning to Uruguay, Belloni became an instructor in the Committee for the Encouragement of Fine Arts, and in 1914, he was picked to succeed painter Carlos María Herrera as director of the institution. Belloni created a sculpture in homage to his recently deceased predecessor, and its unveiling later that year in Montevideo's Paseo del Prado created a demand for his works as monuments.

The first of these was Belloni's La carreta (The Carriage), an ode to the ox-cart drivers ubiquitous in the 19th century, cast in Florence, Italy by the Ferdinando Marinelli Artistic Foundry and unveiled in a city park (today José Batlle y Ordoñez Park), in 1919. La música (1923) a monument to William Tell (1931) followed (also cast in Florence by Ferdinando Marinelli's foundry), and Belloni contributed numerous bronzes and bas-reliefs to the General Assembly of Uruguay, as well.

The noted sculptor also taught painting at the University of Montevideo's School of Architecture. Continuing to sculpt in later life, among his well-known works from this period was Nuevos rumbos (New Paths), a naturalist work overlooking Parque Rodó, as well as a monument to the park's namesake, writer and lawmaker José Enrique Rodó. Belloni completed El entrevero (The Struggle) practically upon his death in 1965, at age 83. The masterpiece was placed upon Fabini Plaza, on 18th of July Avenue, in 1967.

His son Stelio was also a notable sculptor.

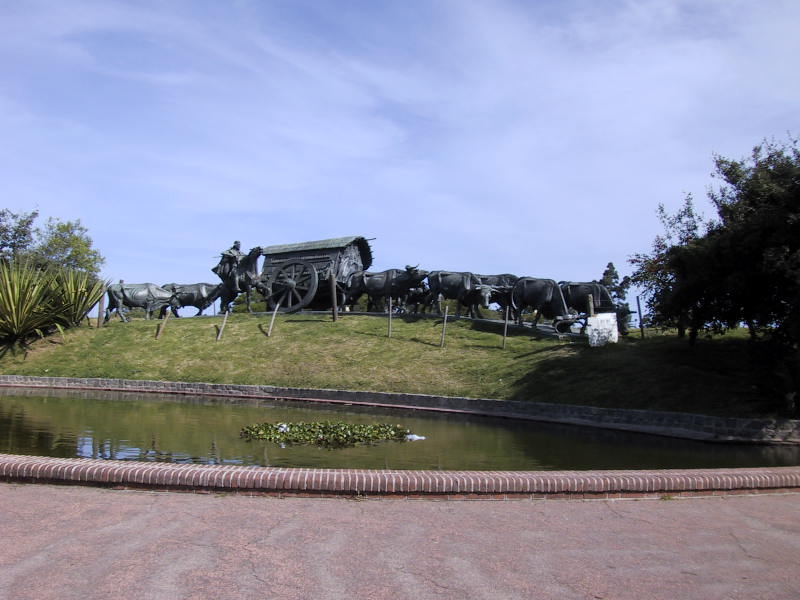
La carreta (1919)

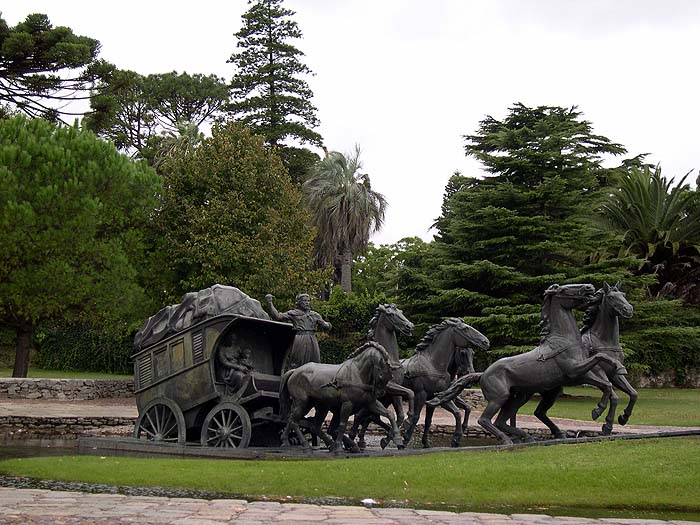
La diligencia (1952)

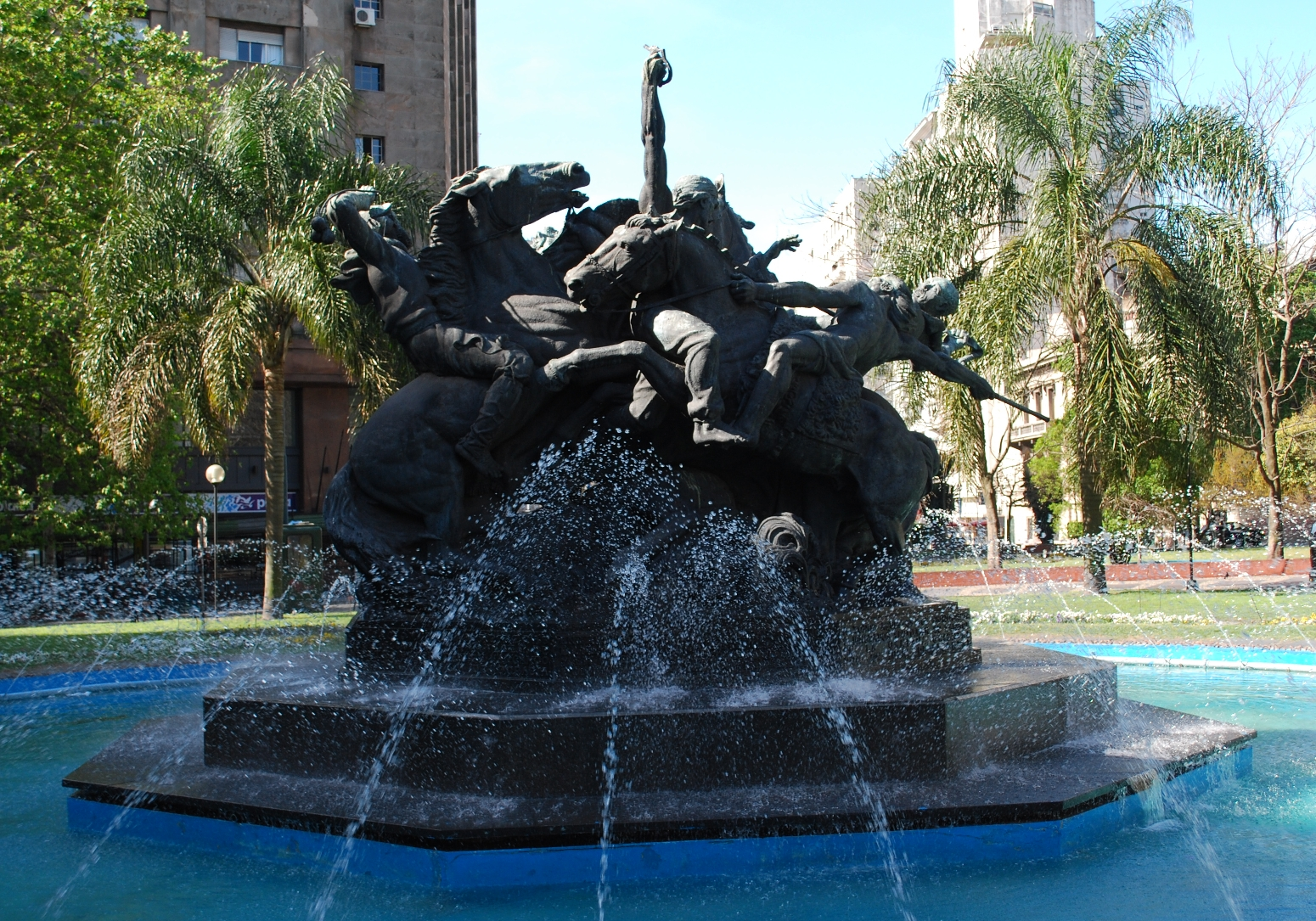
El entrevero (1965)
