= Bely, Russia =

Bely (Russian: Белый; masculine), Belaya (Белая; feminine), or Beloye (Белое; neuter), literally meaning "white", is the name of several inhabited localities in Russia.

Urban localities

- Bely, Tver Oblast, a town in Tver Oblast

Rural localities

- Bely, Krasnodar Krai, a khutor in Temryuksky District of Krasnodar Krai
- Bely, Oryol Oblast, a khutor in Kolpnyansky District of Oryol Oblast
- Belaya, Kostroma Oblast, a village in Pyshchugsky District of Kostroma Oblast
- Belaya, Moscow Oblast, a village in Noginsky District of Moscow Oblast
- Belaya, name of several other rural localities
- Beloye, Republic of Adygea, a selo in Krasnogvardeysky District of the Republic of Adygea
- Beloye, Kursk Oblast, a selo in Oboyansky District of Kursk Oblast
- Beloye, name of several other rural localities
