= Conradin Beeli (died 1770) =

Grisons officer (c. 1700 – 1770)

- Born: Arnold Anton Conradin Beeli c. 1700; Vaz/Obervaz
- Died: 1770
- Occupation: Military officer
- Spouse: Catharina Bavier
- Awards: Order of Saint Louis (1737)

Conradin Beeli (full name Arnold Anton Conradin Beeli; c. 1700 – 1770) was a professional soldier from Vaz/Obervaz in the Three Leagues. He entered French service in 1717, became a colonel in 1745 or 1746 and a brigadier in 1761, and left the service in 1763.

== Biography ==
Conradin Beeli was a member of the Obervaz line of the Beeli family. He was the son of Conradin and of Verena Beeli, who belonged to the Flims line. He married Catharina Bavier.

Beeli was a professional soldier. In 1717 he joined the Swiss Guards regiment in French service, and in 1722 he became an ensign (Fähnrich) in the Beeli company. After 1734 he served in the Salis regiment. From 1742 to 1747 he took part in the campaigns in the Low Countries during the War of the Austrian Succession, from 1745 or 1746 as a colonel. He became capitaine commandant (commanding captain) in 1758 and a brigadier in 1761, and left the service in 1763. In 1737 he had been made a knight of the Order of Saint Louis.
