= Georg Beeli von Belfort (died 1607) =

Grisons politician (died 1607)

- Born: probably Alvaneu
- Died: 6 July 1607; Chur
- Cause of death: Execution
- Occupation: Politician

Georg Beeli von Belfort (also Georg Beeli; died 6 July 1607) was a politician and a prominent leader of the Spanish-Austrian party in the Three Leagues on the eve of the Bündner Wirren. From 1595 to 1605 he was the Austrian bailiff (Landvogt) of the eight jurisdictions at Castels Castle. Although he was one of the instigators of the Great Uprising of 1607, he was imprisoned in Chur and executed for incitement to riot and perjury.

== Biography ==
Castels Castle, the seat of the Austrian bailiff of the eight jurisdictions

Georg Beeli von Belfort was a member of the Beeli family. He was probably born in Alvaneu. His father was presumably Conradin, a podestà and bailiff (Landvogt) of Maienfeld. His power base was the jurisdiction (Gericht) of Inner-Belfort.

From 1587 to 1589 Beeli was vicari (judge) in the Valtellina. From 1595 to 1605 he was the Austrian bailiff (Landvogt) of the eight jurisdictions at Castels Castle. Although he belonged to the League of the Ten Jurisdictions, he was in constant conflict with the Protestants of the Prättigau, who sided with the French-Venetian party, and in 1605 he fled to Chur. In 1523 the government in Innsbruck had not granted a request by the younger Ulrich Beeli for this bailiwick, and when Georg obtained it in 1595 the family had already passed the peak of its power.

Although he was himself one of the instigators of the Great Uprising (Grosser Aufruhr) of 1607, he was taken from the bishop's residence (Hof) in April and imprisoned in the town. Under pressure from the people of the Prättigau and the Lower Engadine, a new criminal court (Strafgericht) had him tortured in June and executed on 6 July for incitement to riot and perjury. He was a prominent leader of the Spanish-Austrian party on the eve of the Bündner Wirren.

== Bibliography ==
- P. Gillardon, Geschichte des Zehngerichtenbundes, 1936, 114, 121–122, 146–147
