= Conradin Beeli (died 1712) =

Grisons military officer (1639–1712)

- Born: 1639; Fideris
- Died: 24 May 1712 (aged 72–73) near Affoltern am Albis
- Occupation: Military officer

Conradin Beeli (1639 – 24 May 1712) was a professional soldier from Fideris in the Three Leagues. He was a colonel in Dutch service and, as a brigadier in the service of Zurich, was killed in the Second War of Villmergen.

== Biography ==
Conradin Beeli was a member of the Fideris line of the Beeli family. He was the son of Conradin, a podestà.

Beeli was a professional soldier. From 1693 he was a lieutenant colonel, and from 1701 to 1705 a colonel in the Capol regiment in Dutch service. As a brigadier in the service of Zurich in the Second War of Villmergen, he was killed near Affoltern am Albis on 24 May 1712, during a reconnaissance ride near Ottenbach. He was buried in the Grossmünster in Zurich and honored with a memorial plaque.

== Bibliography ==
- M. Bundi, Bündner Kriegsdienste in Holland um 1700, 1972, 154–155
- H. Simmen, "Ein Zweig der Beeli von Belfort in Fideris", in Bündner Monatsblatt, 1994, 255–256
- H. Simmen, "Stammbaum der Beeli von Belfort in Fideris", in Bündner Monatsblatt, 1996, 140–141
