= Georg Beeli von Belfort (died 1566) =

Grisons politician (c. 1500 – 1566)

- Born: c. 1500 probably Davos
- Died: 26 August 1566; Jenaz
- Occupation: Politician
- Father: Conradin Beeli von Belfort

Georg Beeli von Belfort (also Georg Beeli; c. 1500 – 26 August 1566) was a politician of the League of the Ten Jurisdictions. He was governor (Landeshauptmann) of the Valtellina three times, and in 1530 he was Landammann (chief magistrate) of Davos and Landammann of the League. In 1542 and 1550 criminal courts convicted him of offenses against the public good.

== Biography ==
Georg Beeli von Belfort was a member of the Beeli family and the son of Conradin. His year of birth is uncertain; he was born around 1500, probably in Davos.

Beeli was governor (Landeshauptmann) of the Valtellina in 1521–1522, 1527–1528 and 1545–1546. In 1530 he was Landammann of Davos and Landammann of the League of the Ten Jurisdictions (Bundslandammann). In 1529 he was suspected of conspiring with Abbot Theodul Schlegel of St. Luzi, and in 1542 and 1550 criminal courts (Strafgerichte) convicted him of offenses against the public good. He died in Jenaz in 1566.

== Bibliography ==
- P. Gillardon, Geschichte des Zehngerichtenbundes, 1936
