= Conradin Beeli von Belfort =

Grisons politician (died c. 1521)

- Died: c. 1521
- Occupations: Politician; military officer
- Children: Georg Beeli von Belfort
- Father: Ulrich Beeli
- Relatives: Nikolaus Beeli von Belfort (brother)

Conradin Beeli von Belfort (also Conradin Beeli; died c. 1521) was a politician and military leader of the League of the Ten Jurisdictions. He was Landammann (chief magistrate) of Davos and Landammann of the League in 1491, 1497 and 1507, commanded the League's troops in the Valtellina campaign of 1512, and was bailiff of the lordship of Maienfeld from 1515.

== Biography ==
Conradin Beeli von Belfort was a member of the Beeli family. He was the son of Ulrich, bailiff (Vogt) of Belfort, and the brother of Nikolaus. He was the father of Georg.

In 1491, 1497 and 1507 Beeli was Landammann of Davos and Landammann of the League of the Ten Jurisdictions (Bundslandammann). He set his seal to the League's statutes (Bundessatzungen) of 1498. In the Valtellina campaign (Veltlinerzug) of 1512 he commanded the League's troops as field captain (Feldhauptmann). From 1515 to about 1518 or 1521 he was bailiff (Landvogt) of the lordship (Herrschaft) of Maienfeld. He died around 1521.

== Bibliography ==
- P. Gillardon, Geschichte des Zehngerichtenbundes, 1936
- A. Collenberg, Die Bündner Amtsleute in der Herrschaft Maienfeld 1509–1799 und in den Untertanenlanden Veltlin, Bormio und Chiavenna 1512–1797, 1999, 26
