= Beli Breg, Bulgaria =

Beli Breg Бели брег
- Village
- Location within Bulgaria
- Coordinates: 43.5167°N 23.4333°E
- Country: Bulgaria
- Province: Montana Province
- Municipality: Boychinovtsi
- Time zone: UTC+2 (EET)
  - Summer (DST): UTC+3 (EEST)

Beli Breg is a village in Boychinovtsi Municipality, Montana Province, north-western Bulgaria.
