= Skopje 2014 =

Macedonian infrastructure project

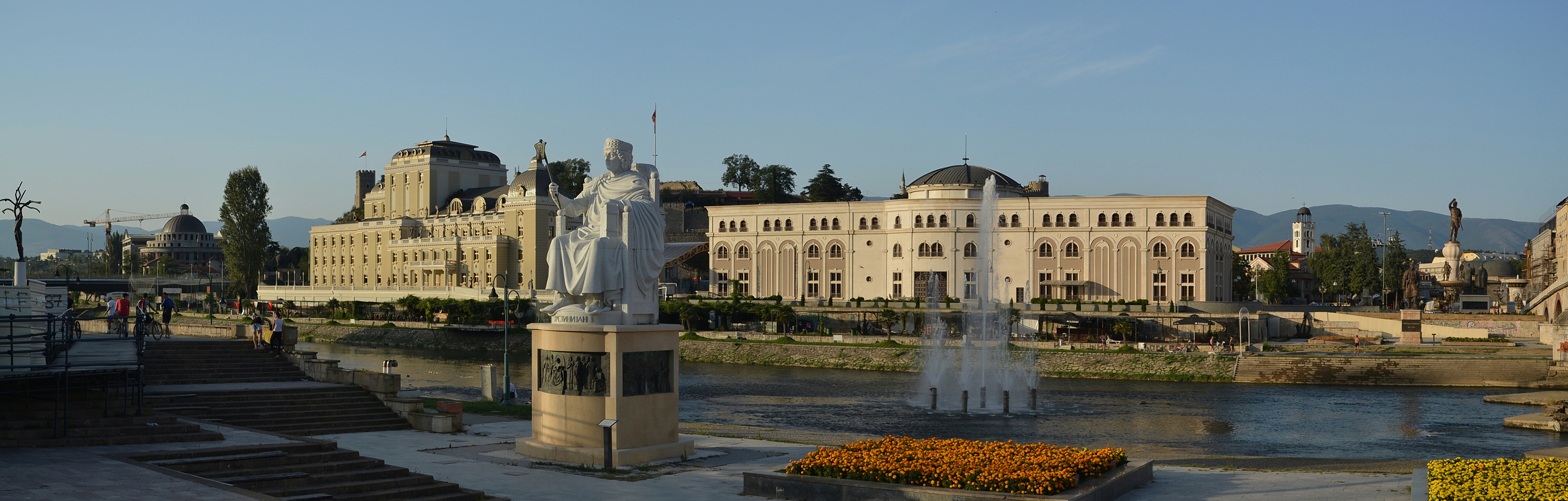
View of the buildings finished after the 1963 earthquake (2014).

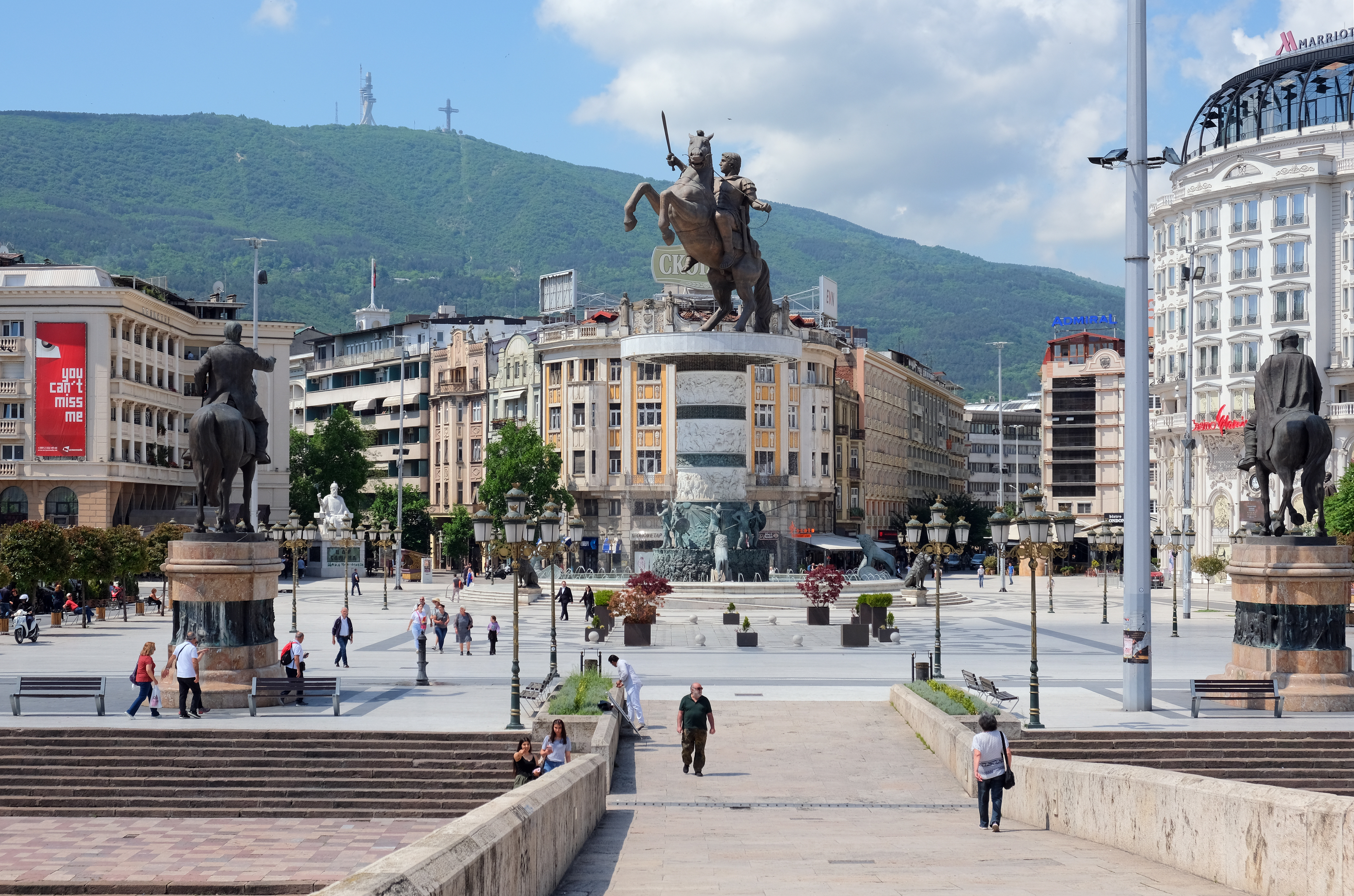
Macedonia Square after the addition of many monuments and façade reconstructions

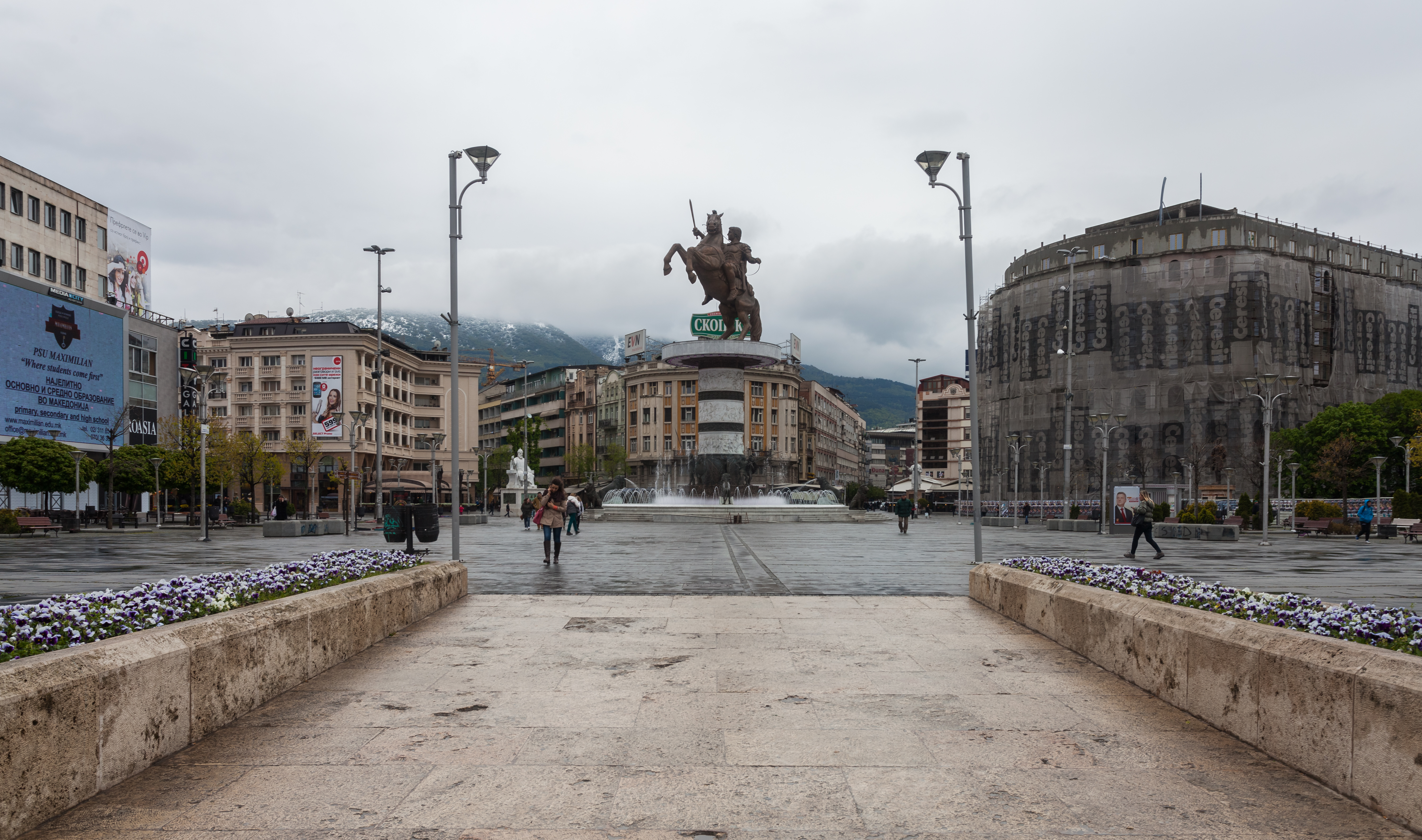
View toward Macedonia Square from the Stone Bridge in July 2011. Visible are the statues of Dame Gruev, Goce Delčev, Tsar Samuil, and the under construction Warrior on Horseback monument

Skopje 2014 (Macedonian: Скопје 2014) was a project financed by the government of the Republic of Macedonia (now North Macedonia) of the then-ruling nationalist party VMRO-DPMNE, with the official purpose of giving the capital Skopje a more classical appeal but designed more earthquake-proof. The project, officially announced in 2010, consisted mainly of the construction of colleges, museums and government buildings, as well as the erection of monuments depicting historical figures from the region of Macedonia. Around 20 buildings and over 40 monuments were to be constructed as part of the project. The Skopje 2014 project encompassed the construction, from 2010 to 2014, of 136 structures built at a cost of more than US$700 million.

The project was seen as politically controversial in its nature and as a nation-building endeavour, as it tried to further impose Macedonian historiography, promoting a Macedonian identity with unbroken continuity from antiquity over the Middle Ages to the modern times. It was one of the several major initiatives taken by the VMRO-DPMNE government in accordance with the policy of antiquization. It relied on a set of nondemocratic mechanisms aiming to expand the political dominance of that party and to leave its enduring stamp on city’s urban environment. Skopje 2014 has also generated controversy for its cost, for which estimates range from €80 to 500 million. Some constructions of the project began deteriorating by the early 2020s. The project is credited with positively impacting tourism.

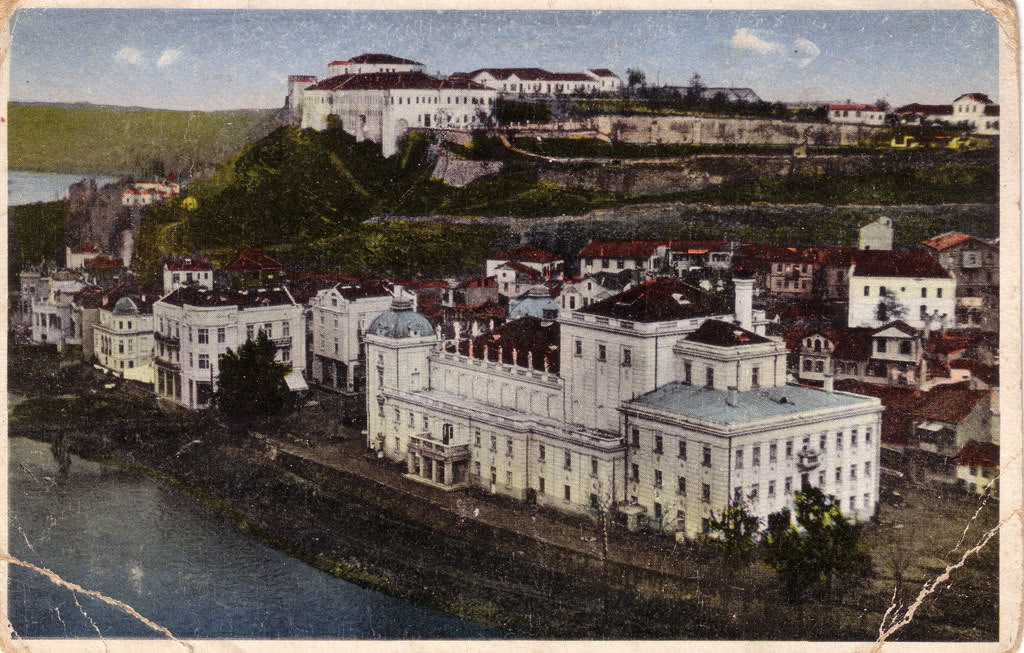
The National Theatre and Kale Fortress before the 1963 earthquake

== Background ==
The 1963 Skopje earthquake destroyed approximately 80% of the city, including most of the neoclassical buildings in the central part of Skopje. The rebuilding that followed saw the construction of mostly plain modernist architecture. This is one of the reasons given by the VMRO-DPMNE government for the necessity of the project, to give Skopje a more monumental and visually pleasing image. Another reason is to restore the missing sense of national pride and create a more metropolitan atmosphere. In a speech at the opening of Porta Macedonia in January 2012, then Prime Minister Nikola Gruevski stated that Skopje 2014 was his idea.

=== Tourism and urban regeneration ===
According to a 2021 study by Dejan Iliev, a geographer at Ss. Cyril and Methodius University in Skopje, the project contributed to an increase in the number of foreign tourists visiting the city, which he describes as an example of urban regeneration driven by tourism and the Skopje 2014 project. Iliev found that foreign visitors were concentrated in the central municipality of Centar, which accounted for 53.1% of all foreign tourists recorded in the city in 2016, and that attractions built outside the centre encouraged tourism in other municipalities. Across the period he analysed, 2001 to 2016, the number of accommodation establishments in Skopje rose from 41, of which 23 were hotels, to 120, of which 82 were hotels, with new hotels appearing in outlying municipalities such as Karpoš, Kisela Voda and Aerodrom. He also recorded a shift in the composition of foreign visitors towards countries with higher purchasing power, among them Germany, Italy, the United Kingdom, France and the United States. Iliev notes that the redevelopment of the central areas is considered exaggerated and controversial by most scholars, and that the project remained contested among residents.

=== Criticism ===
The Skopje 2014 project has been criticized by various groups since the time it was first announced. The cost of the project is estimated at anywhere from €80 to more than 500 million and is seen by many as a waste of resources in a country with high unemployment and poverty. The project is also believed by critics to be a distraction from these problems.

The Social Democratic Union of Macedonia, the main opposition party, opposes the project and has alleged that the monuments could have cost six to ten times less than what the government paid.

The project is seen as a part of the government's "antiquisation" policy, in which the country seeks to claim ancient Macedonian figures like Alexander the Great and Philip II of Macedon for itself. The timing of the project, following the country's non-invitation to NATO due to its continued naming dispute with Greece, has led to speculation that it is retaliation or an attempt to put pressure on Greece. Some residents see the scheme as the embodiment of nationalism by a conservative government focused as much on giving the metropolis a facelift as changing the nation's history and have described it as a mini-Las Vegas while others appreciate its classical nod to the past.

Sam Vaknin, a former adviser to Nikola Gruevski, has stated that the project is not anti-Greek or anti-Bulgarian, but anti-Albanian. In an interview, he said "Antiquisation has a double goal, which is to marginalise the Albanians and create an identity that will not allow Albanians to become Macedonians." To shift attention from Albanians being absent from the Skopje 2014 project, the Macedonian government agreed to fund Skanderbeg Square built around the existing Skanderbeg monument in the part of Skopje with a majority Albanian population. Later additions to the Skopje 2014 project were made that included depictions of ethnic Albanians in the monuments such as Nexhat Agolli, Josif Bageri, and Pjetër Bogdani, as well as others on the Art Bridge.

Architects have criticized the aesthetics of the project and believe the money could have been spent on constructing modern buildings. It has also been described as nationalist kitsch which "brings unknown history" to the citizens and former prime minister Zoran Zaev has labeled it an "idiotic project". Instead of leading to the recognition and acceptance that the country was seeking, the project produced international ridicule and scorn.

=== 2018 ===
In late February 2018, the government and institutions of the Republic of Macedonia announced the halt of the Skopje 2014 program and began removing its controversial monuments and statues. The Macedonian Ministry of Culture also has set up a Commission to envisage the possibility of removing the rest of them, such as the monuments of Alexander the Great and Philip II of Macedon. As a first step, the monument of Andon Kyoseto, which was one of the mostly disputed monuments of the project, was dismantled. In June 2018, the Macedonian Government announced that the monuments would be renamed and marked with inscriptions honouring Greek-Macedonian friendship. The monument of Boris Sarafov was also dismantled without explanation in 2018 by municipal authorities.

=== Condition of monuments ===
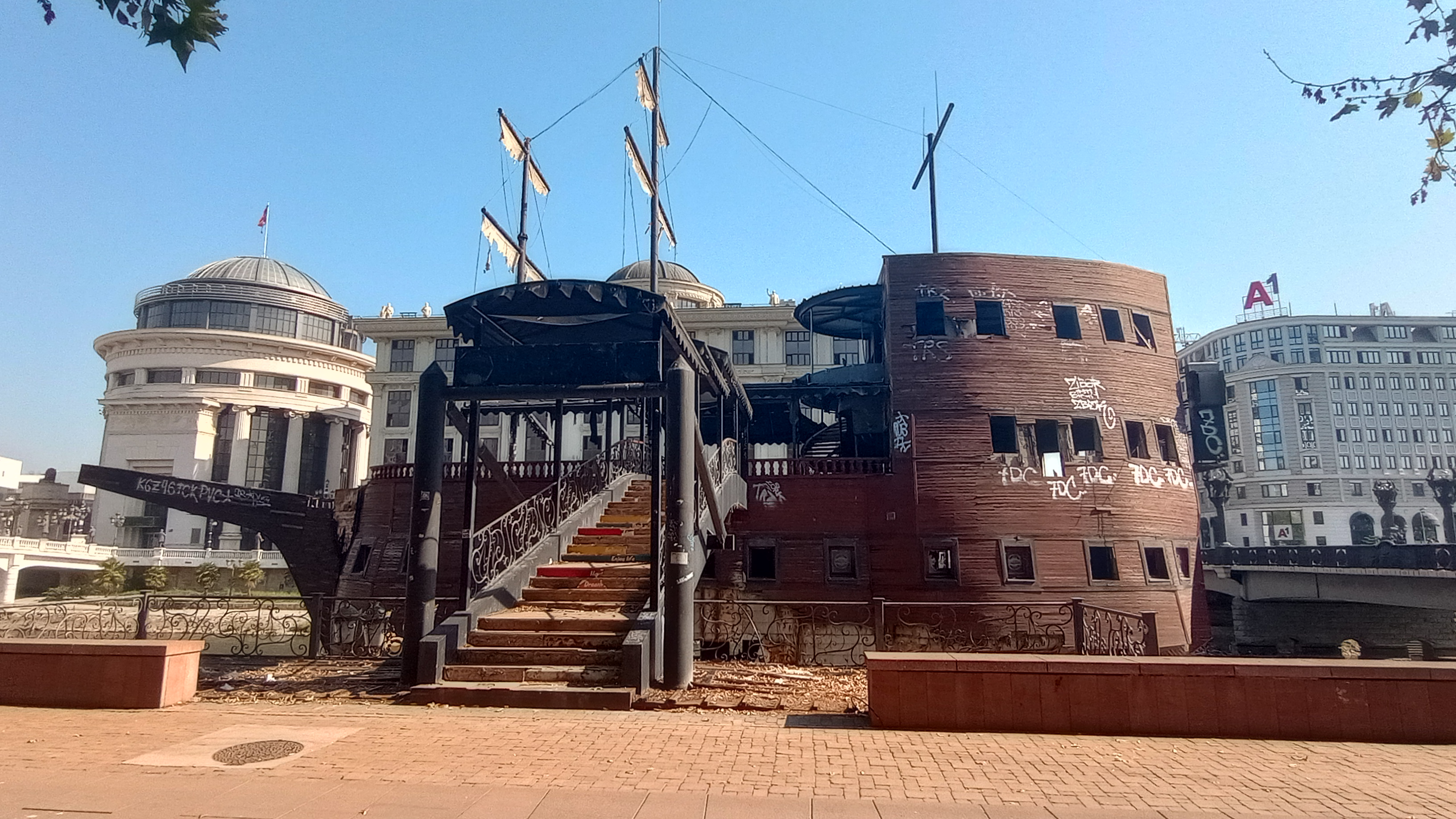
One of the static boats as seen in 2025, with graffiti and damage

As of 13 July 2021, it was reported that some of the monuments of the “Skopje 2014” revamp were already crumbling. Cracks and crevices are visible in many of them, exposing use of poor building materials, and that the damage would be worse if an earthquake rages over Skopje again.

== Plans ==
=== Bridges ===
==== New bridge constructions ====
===== Art Bridge =====
The Skopje 2014 project calls for two new pedestrian bridges to be built across the Vardar in the centre of the city. One is the Art Bridge, which is being constructed between the Freedom Bridge and the also under-construction Eye Bridge. It is expected to cost €2.5 million. The bridge will include 29 sculptures, with 14 at each end and one in the centre. It will be 83 metres (272.3 feet) in length and 9.2 m (30.2 ft) in width, while the central part of the bridge will be 12 m (39.4 ft) wide.

===== Eye Bridge =====
The other bridge being constructed as part of the project is the Eye Bridge. Situated between the Stone Bridge and the under-construction Art Bridge, it began construction in 2011. The pedestrian bridge will include 28 sculptures and will cost around €1.5 million.

==== Existing bridge renovations ====
===== Freedom Bridge =====
The project also includes plans to renovate existing bridges in central Skopje, one of which is the Freedom Bridge, which connects Vojvoda Vasil Adžilarski Street in Centar Municipality to Stiv Naumov Street in Čair Municipality. First constructed in 1936, the renovation began in 2011 and is expected to be completed in May 2014. The total cost will be roughly €1.15 million.

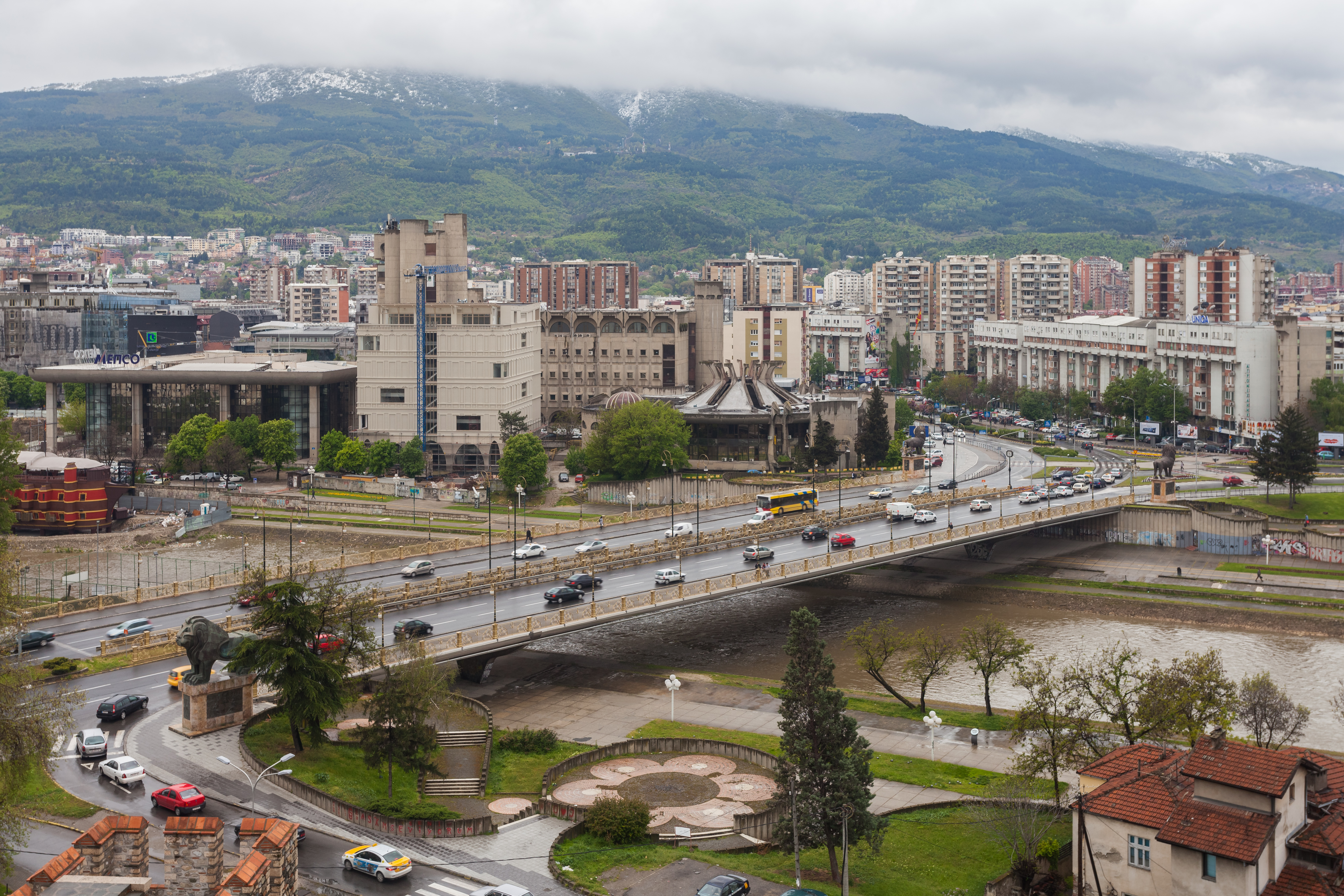
Aerial view of the renovated Goce Delčev Bridge

===== Goce Delčev Bridge =====
The renovation of the Goce Delčev Bridge, which connects Ilinden Boulevard in Centar to Goce Delčev Boulevard in Čair across the Vardar, began on 11 April 2011 and finished later in the year. The renovation included new gold-coloured fencing and 26 lampposts. The project cost roughly €500,000, including €60,000 for the new lighting. Four statues depicting lions, two at each end, were also placed on the bridge in 2010. The ones on the western side were cast in Florence and cost €1.5 million.

===== Revolution Bridge =====
The Revolution Bridge, first built in 1963 across the Vardar connecting Kočo Racin Boulevard in Centar to Krste Misirkov Boulevard in Čair, was also renovated as part of the Skopje 2014 project. It began on 9 December 2010 and was completed in May 2011. The renovation included basic repairs as well as the installation of 22 lampposts and iron-wrought fencing. The renovation cost €450,000.

=== Cultural buildings ===
==== Macedonian Philharmonic Orchestra hall ====
Notable in Skopje 2014 for its bold modern architecture as opposed to the usual neoclassical style seen in the project, the under-construction concert hall to house the Macedonian Philharmonic Orchestra is one of the first buildings to begin construction in the project, with the cornerstone having been laid in June 2009. The exterior of the building is nearing completion. The concert hall is planned to have excellent acoustics and will have a capacity of 900 seats.

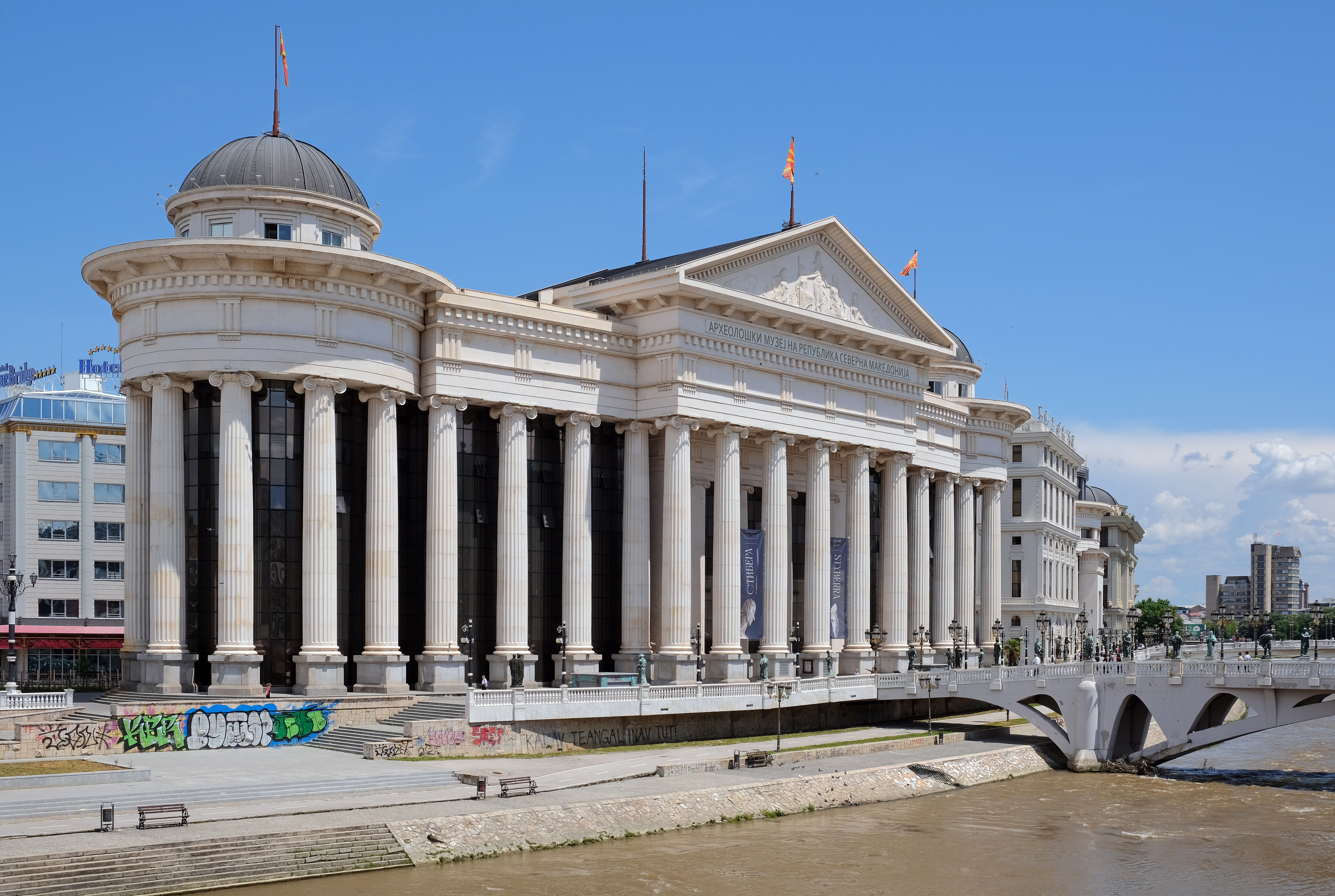
The completed Museum of Archaeology

==== Museum of Archaeology ====
The Museum of Archaeology began construction in 2009 and opened in September 2014. Although the building primarily serves as a museum, it also houses the Constitutional Court and the National Archive of the Republic of North Macedonia. It is situated on the eastern bank of the Vardar, across the river from Macedonia Square. The exterior of the museum is among the more monumental buildings of the project, with its Greek Revival architecture. VMRO-DPMNE, the ruling party, states the budget for the construction as 436,000,000 denars.

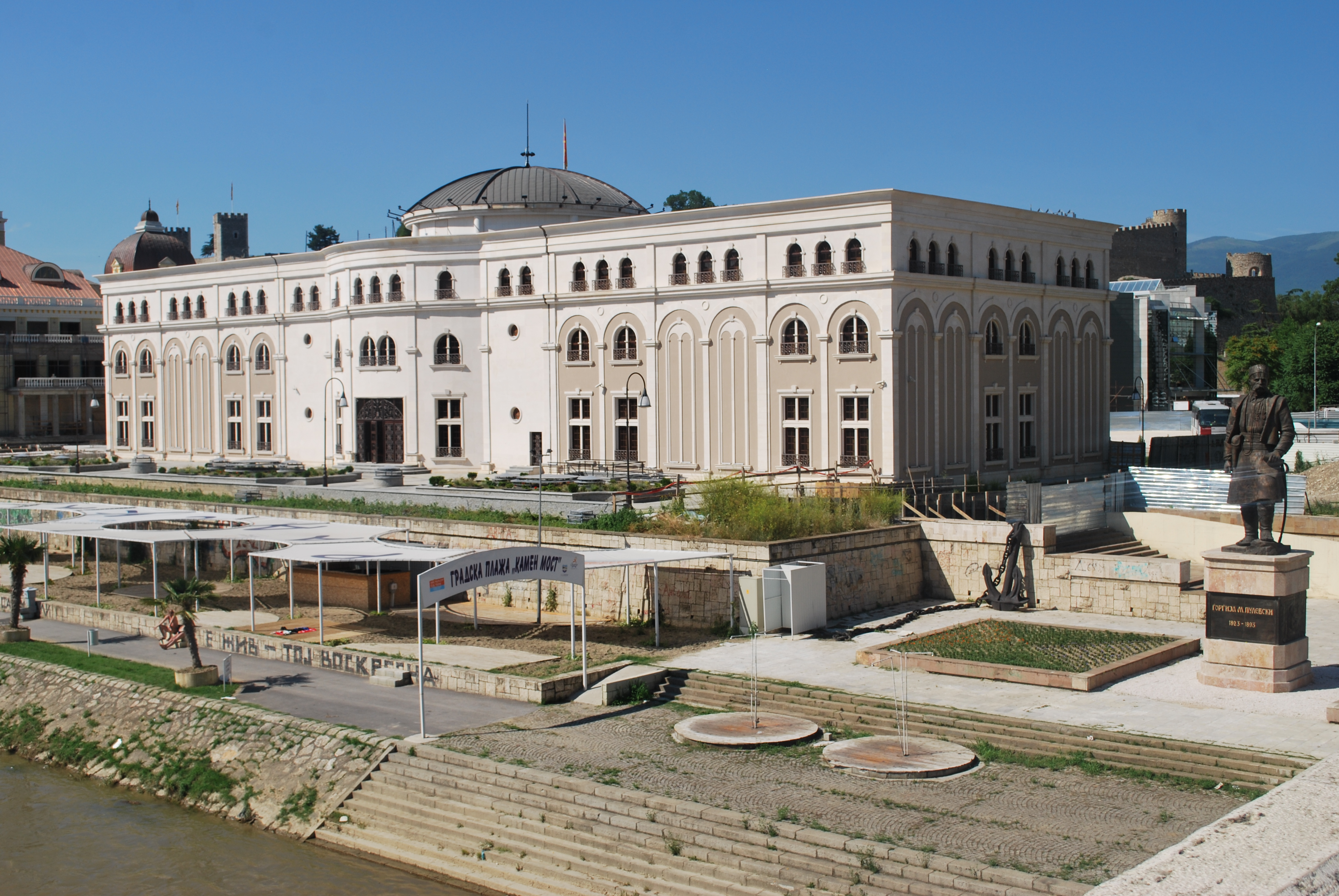
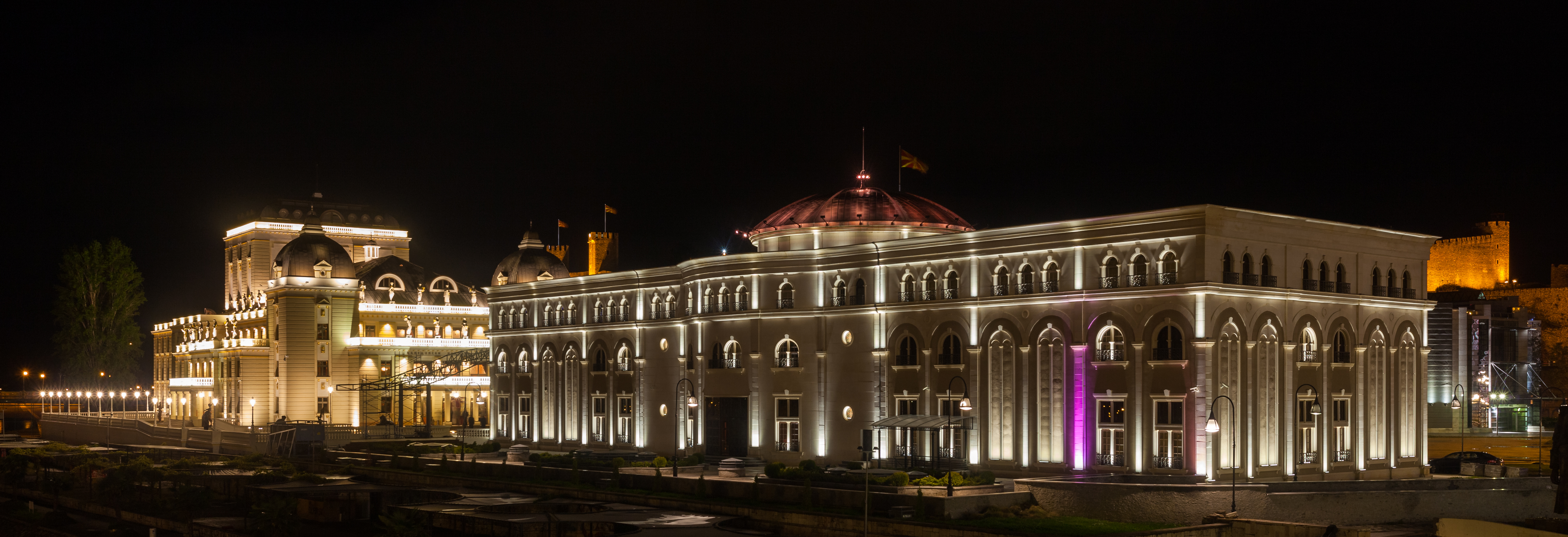
The completed Museum of the Macedonian Struggle

==== Museum of the Macedonian Struggle ====
The Museum of the Macedonian Struggle for Statehood and Independence − Museum of VMRO and Museum of the Victims of the Communist Regime exhibits the strive for an independent Macedonian nation from the Ottoman Empire and later Yugoslavia. It is divided into 16 departments and includes over 100 wax figures of historical individuals. The museum lies on the eastern bank of the Vardar River just northwest of the Museum of Archaeology, opposite Macedonia Square. Construction began in June 2008 and it formally opened on 10 September 2011. The total cost of the museum, which covers 2,500 m^{2} (26,909.8 ft^{2}), was roughly €10 million.

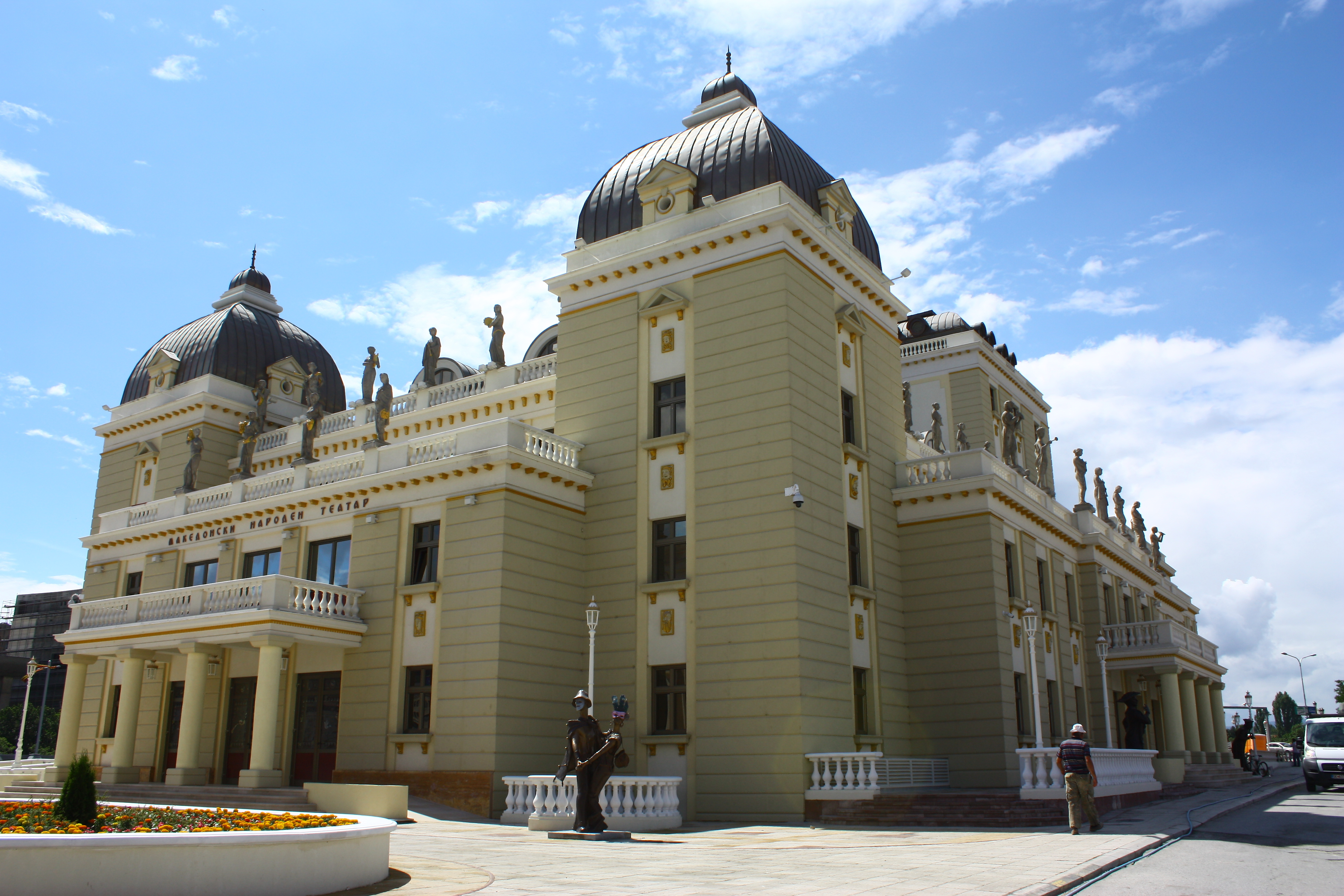
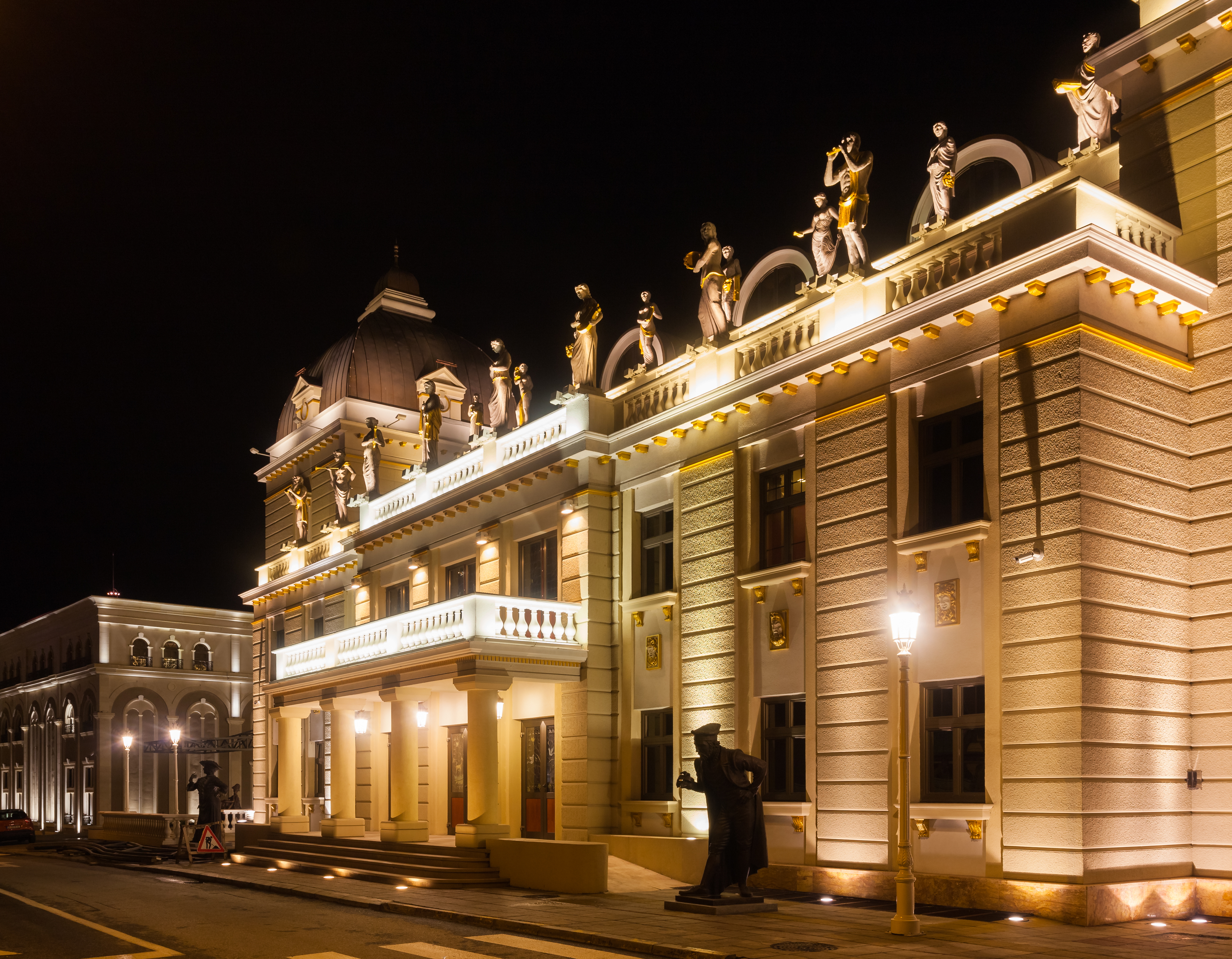
The completed National Theatre

==== National Theatre ====
The former National Theatre destroyed in the 1963 Skopje earthquake will be completely reconstructed, as part of the Skopje 2014 project. Construction of the building, however, began in December 2007, three years before the official announcing of Skopje 2014. Construction was originally planned to be completed in 2009, though it ended up being completed a few years after. The theatre stands on its original location on the eastern bank of the Vardar. The cost is estimated to be at least €6 million and may be as high as €30 million.

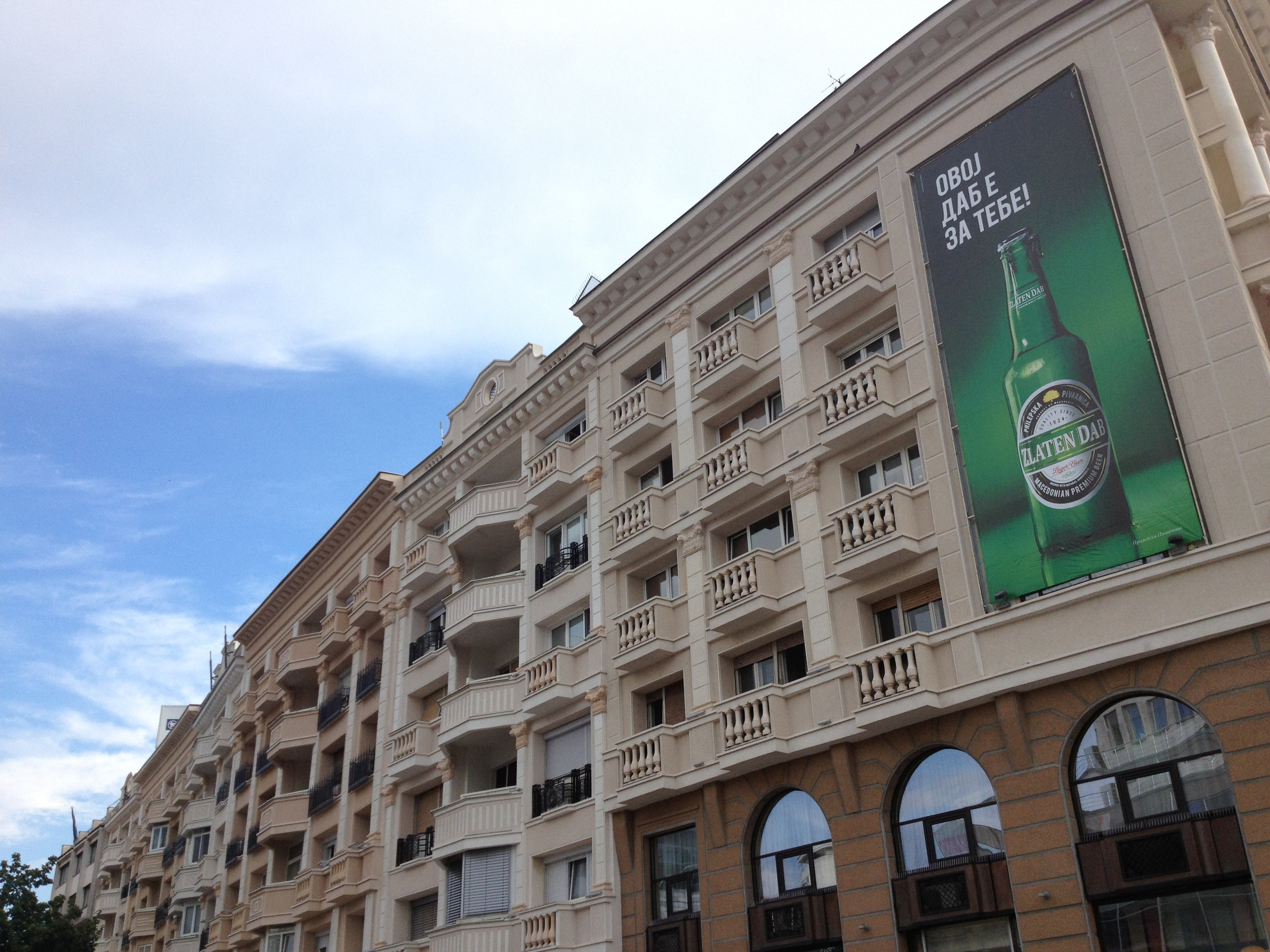
Reconstructed façades near Macedonia Square

=== Façade reconstructions ===
The Skopje 2014 project also includes plans to transform the façades of existing buildings in central Skopje into the neoclassical style. This includes the following buildings:

- Buildings along Dimitrija Čupovski Street
- Buildings along Macedonia Street
- Buildings along Nikola Vapcarov Street
- Buildings around Macedonia Square
- City Trade Center
- Department of Transport and Communications Building, located on Karpoš's Rebellion Square.
- Government of the Republic of North Macedonia building. The new façade appearance choice for this building was made by the Macedonian public through online votes on the government's website. There were five choices and the neoclassical choice won a plurality.
- MEPSO Building, located north of Macedonia Square.
- Ministry of Justice building
- Parliament building. The renovation of the Parliament also includes the construction of cupolas atop the building.

=== Government buildings ===
The following are new buildings being constructed to house various governmental functions.

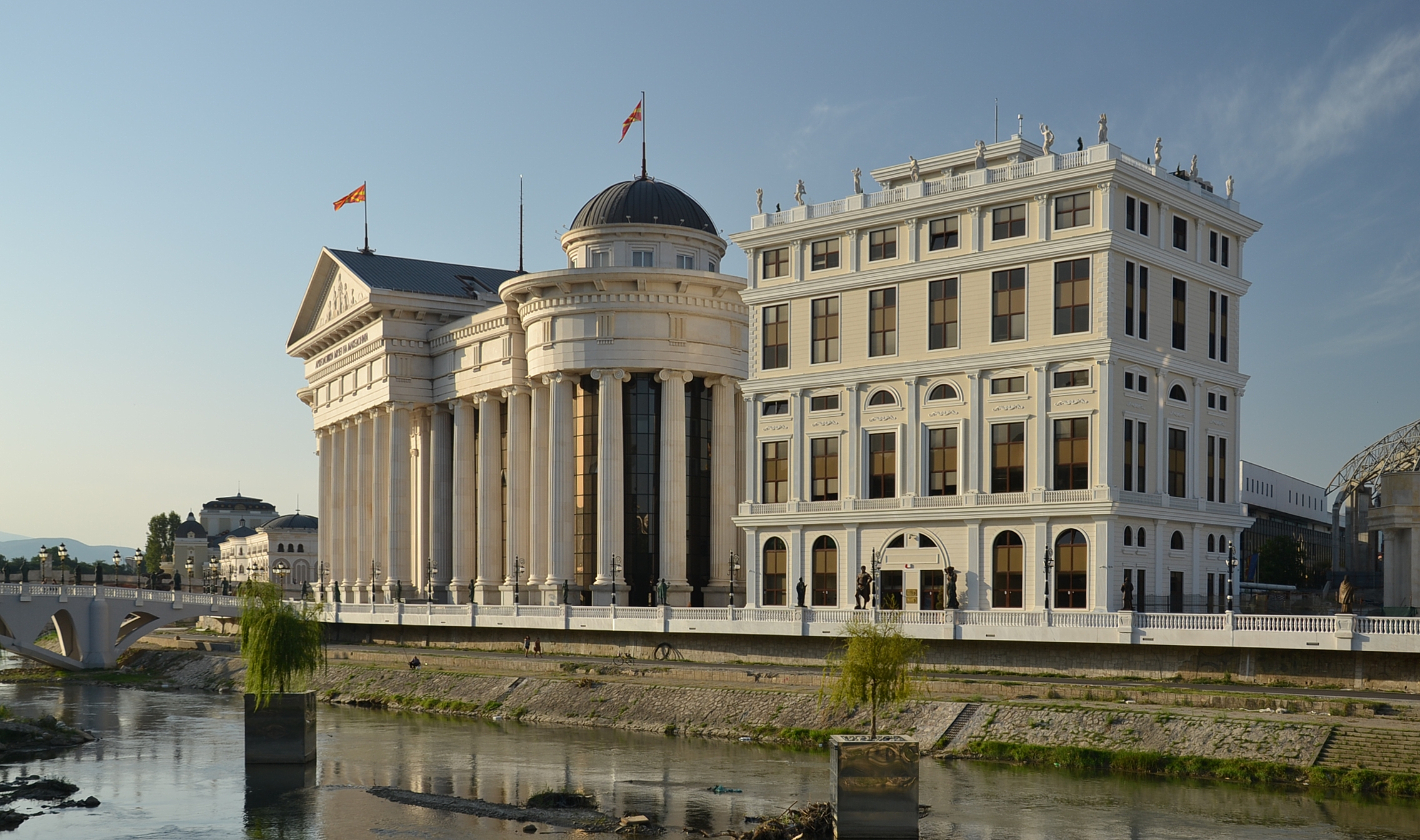
Agency for Electronic Communications (right)

==== Agency for Electronic Communications ====
The cornerstone for the new building to house the Agency for Electronic Communications was laid on 30 March 2011. It is being constructed on the eastern bank of the Vardar in between two other Skopje 2014 buildings, the Museum of Archaeology and the Financial Police Building.

The total cost of the building's construction is around €8.5 million, which the government claims will be fully funded by the Agency's budget. It is expected to be completed in 15 months or by the late summer of 2012.

==== Criminal Court Building ====
A new Criminal Court Building is being constructed as part of the project. The cornerstone for the building was laid on 25 May 2010. The building, 10 stories tall, has been topped out. In it will be 74 judicial offices, 22 high courts, and two large courtrooms. The two-story basement will contain parking. The building, reported to cost €8.3 million, was planned to be completed after 18 months of construction.

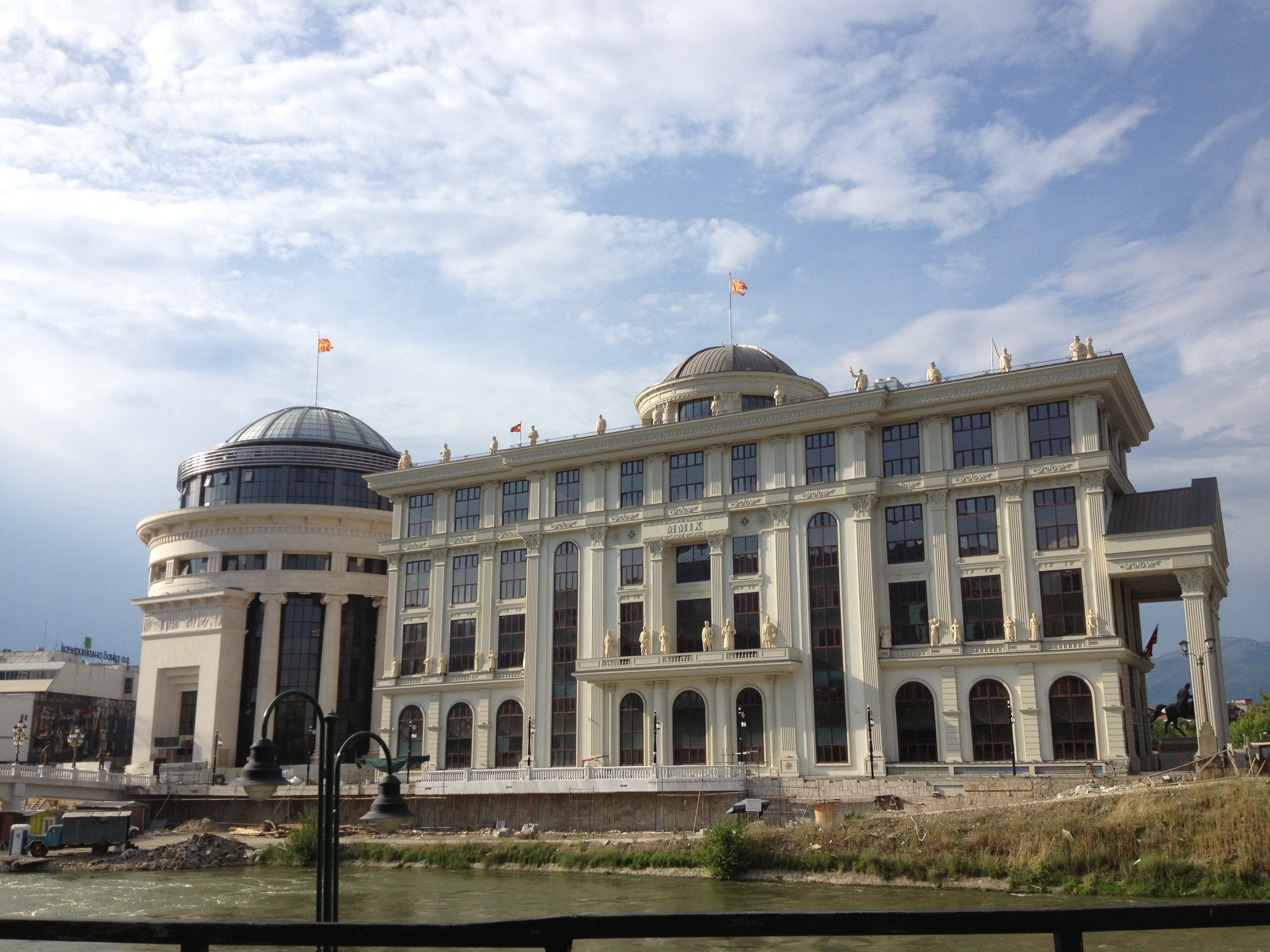
The completed Financial Police and Ministry of Foreign Affairs buildings

==== Financial Police Building ====
On 11 October 2010 the cornerstone for the new building to house the Financial Police of the Republic of Macedonia was laid. The site is located between the new Ministry of Foreign Affairs and the new Agency for Electronic Communications. The building, currently several months from completion, is cylindrical in shape and is capped by a dome-shaped roof. The total cost of construction will be roughly €13 million.

==== Ministry of Finance ====
The government, in March 2011, invested €8.9 million into transforming an abandoned uncompleted building in central Skopje into a new home for the Ministry of Finance. Like the other governmental buildings in Skopje 2014, it will have a neoclassical appearance. Though it was scheduled to be completed in the first quarter of 2012, the building remains far from completion.

==== Ministry of Foreign Affairs ====
Construction of the new Ministry of Foreign Affairs building began in January 2010. It is located on the eastern bank of the Vardar between the Financial Police Building and Stiv Naumov Street. It will have two basement levels, seven above-ground levels, and a terrace atop the building. The building, which is nearly complete on the exterior, stands at a height of 27 m (88.6 ft) and will have costed €13.5 million when completed.

==== New City Hall ====
A new city hall for Skopje is being constructed below the Kale Fortress, on the eastern bank of the Vardar. It is being constructed, as most other buildings in the project, in the neoclassical style and will cost roughly €15 million. It will be 21 m (68.9 ft) tall, with six above-ground floors.

==== Old City Hall ====
Although a new city hall for Skopje is being constructed, the former one destroyed in the 1963 Skopje earthquake will be fully reconstructed, as part of the Skopje 2014 project. It will be built on its original location at the north side of Macedonia Square, to the west of the Vardar Quay. A Greek investor will be building the Old City Hall, as well as a Marriott Hotel to the immediate left of the building, after purchasing the land in March 2011.

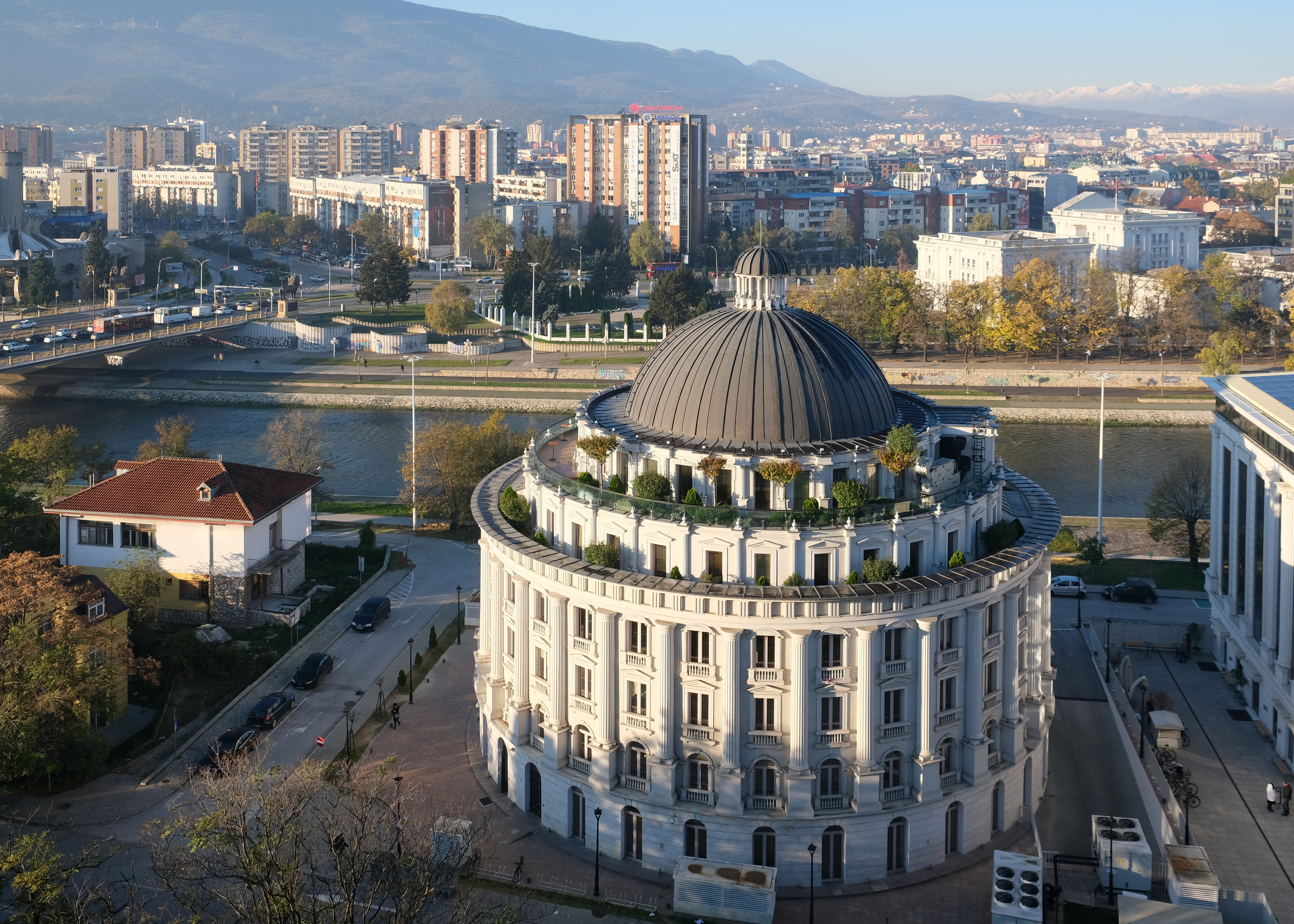
Head office building of PE Water Supply and Sewerage (Macedonian: ЈП „Водовод и канализација“)

==== Water Management Building ====
Among the buildings being constructed below the Kale Fortress on the eastern bank of the Vardar is the Water Management Building. Construction of the building began in December 2011. It is expected to be completed in three years at a cost of €10 million.

=== Monuments ===
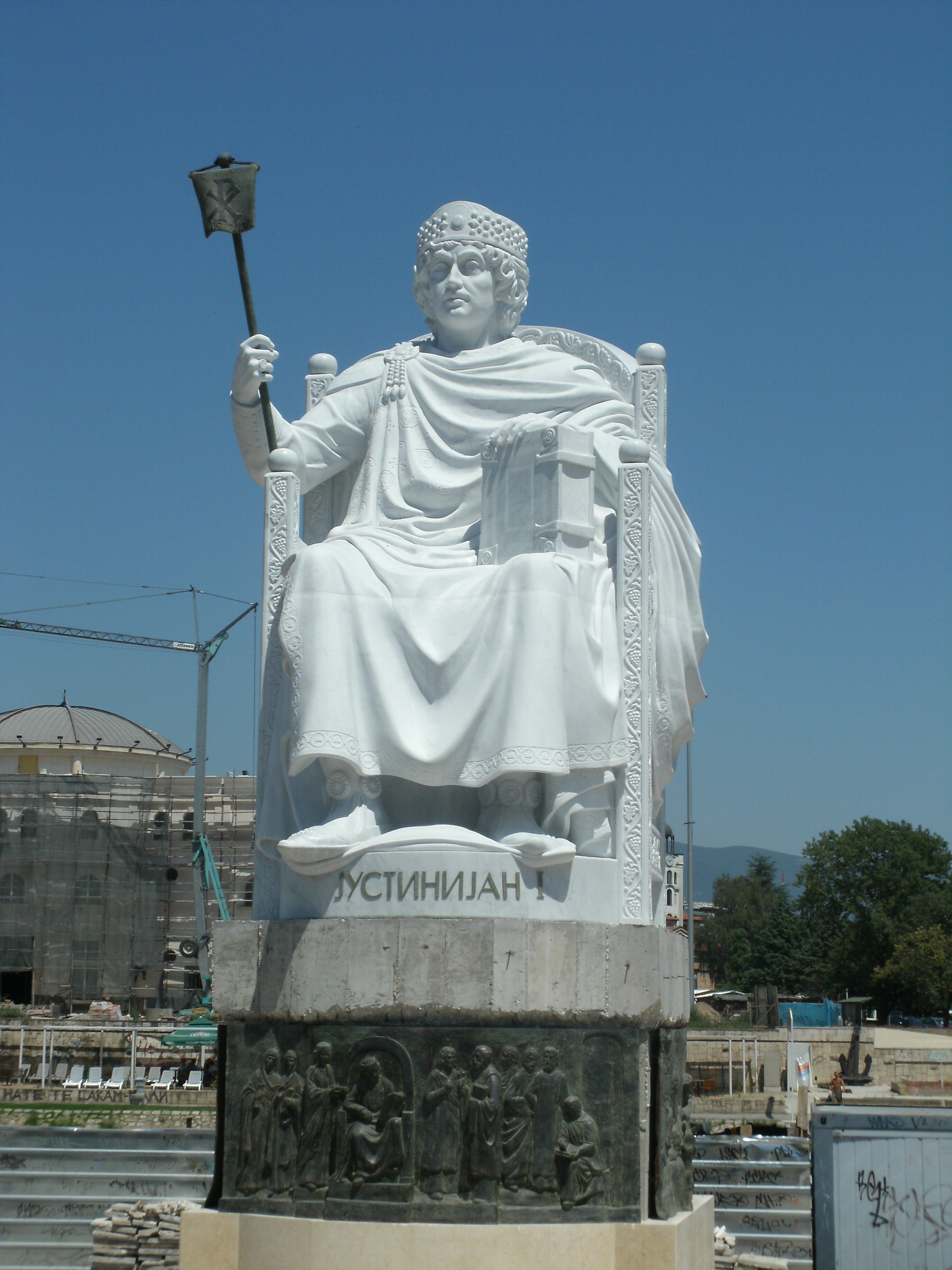
Justinian I monument

==== Justinian I ====
The monument of Justinian I, born in Tauresium just outside modern Skopje, arrived at Macedonia Square on 16 June 2011. Similar to the monument of Tsar Samuil, also on Macedonia Square, it consists of Justinian I sitting on a throne, which is placed on a pedestal. The monument is made of white marble with the exception of the bronze reliefs on the pedestal, also characteristics it shares with the Tsar Samuil monument. The pedestal is 3.5 m (11.5 ft) tall, while Justinian upon his throne measures a further 5 m (16.4 ft) in height.

The monument sits just north of the Stone Bridge, at the western bank of the Vardar River. It was made in Florence and cost over €1 million.

Sculpted by hand in the Pietro Bazzanti e Figlio Art Gallery in Florence.

==== Mother Teresa ====
The construction of a monument consisting of a statue of Skopje native Mother Teresa and a fountain is planned. The monument will be located near the MEPSO building, which is north of Macedonia Square near the Vardar Quay, though location on the roundabout near the Goce Delčev Bridge is also a possibility. It is planned to stand around 30 m (98.4 ft) in height, even taller than the Warrior on Horseback monument.

It has been reported that a donation from India will fund the construction of the new Mother Teresa monument, who is already memorialized in the city with the Memorial House of Mother Teresa and a plaque marking the spot of her birth.

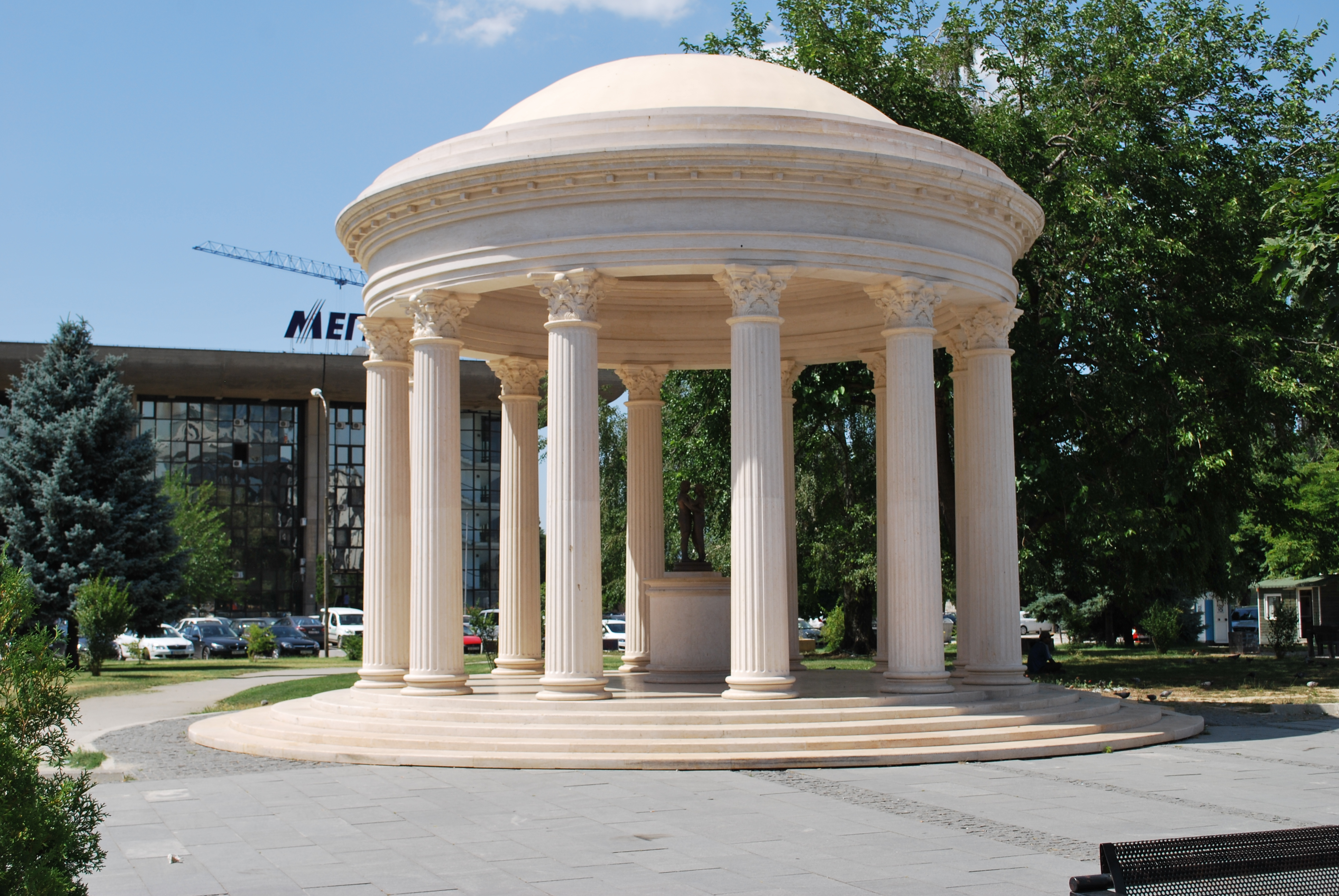
The Pavilion at Macedonia Square

==== Pavilion at Macedonia Square ====
The Pavilion at Macedonia Square is situated on the north side of Macedonia Square. Construction began in early 2011 and was completed later that year at a cost of €350,000. The pavilion consists of a dome supported by several columns, covering a statue of a romantic couple.

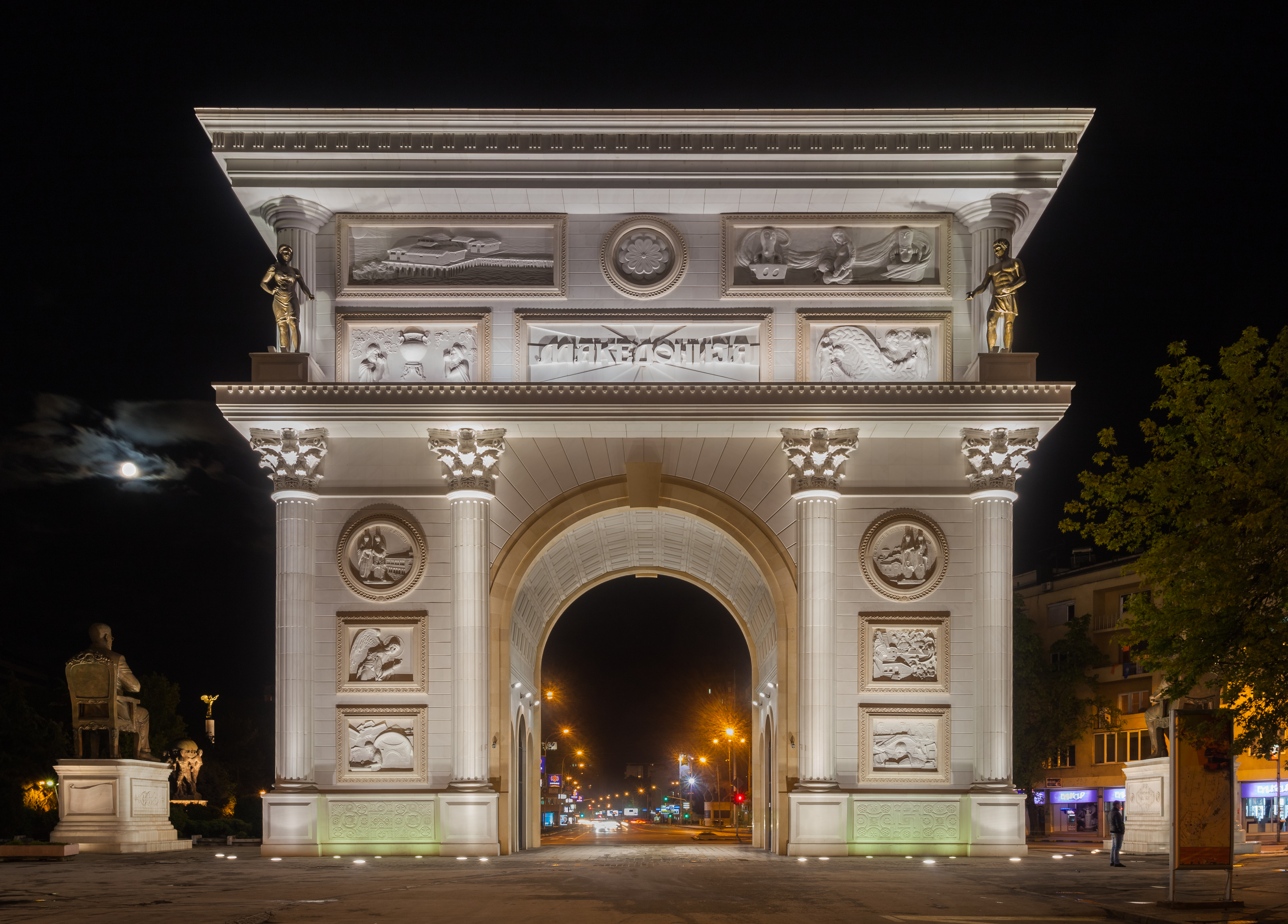
Porta Macedonia

==== Porta Macedonia ====
One of the main symbols of the project is Porta Macedonia, a triumphal arch situated on 11 October Street, near Macedonia Square. The arch is meant to commemorate the long struggle for Macedonian independence. It is 21 m (68.9 ft) tall and contains 32 reliefs carved on the outside, depicting events from pre-history to the independence of the Republic of Macedonia. The inside of the arch consists of two levels, in which a souvenir shop and a gallery are located, and a rooftop observation deck. It formally opened to the public on Christmas Eve, 6 January 2012. The construction of Porta Macedonia is estimated at €4.5 million.

==== Tsar Samuil ====
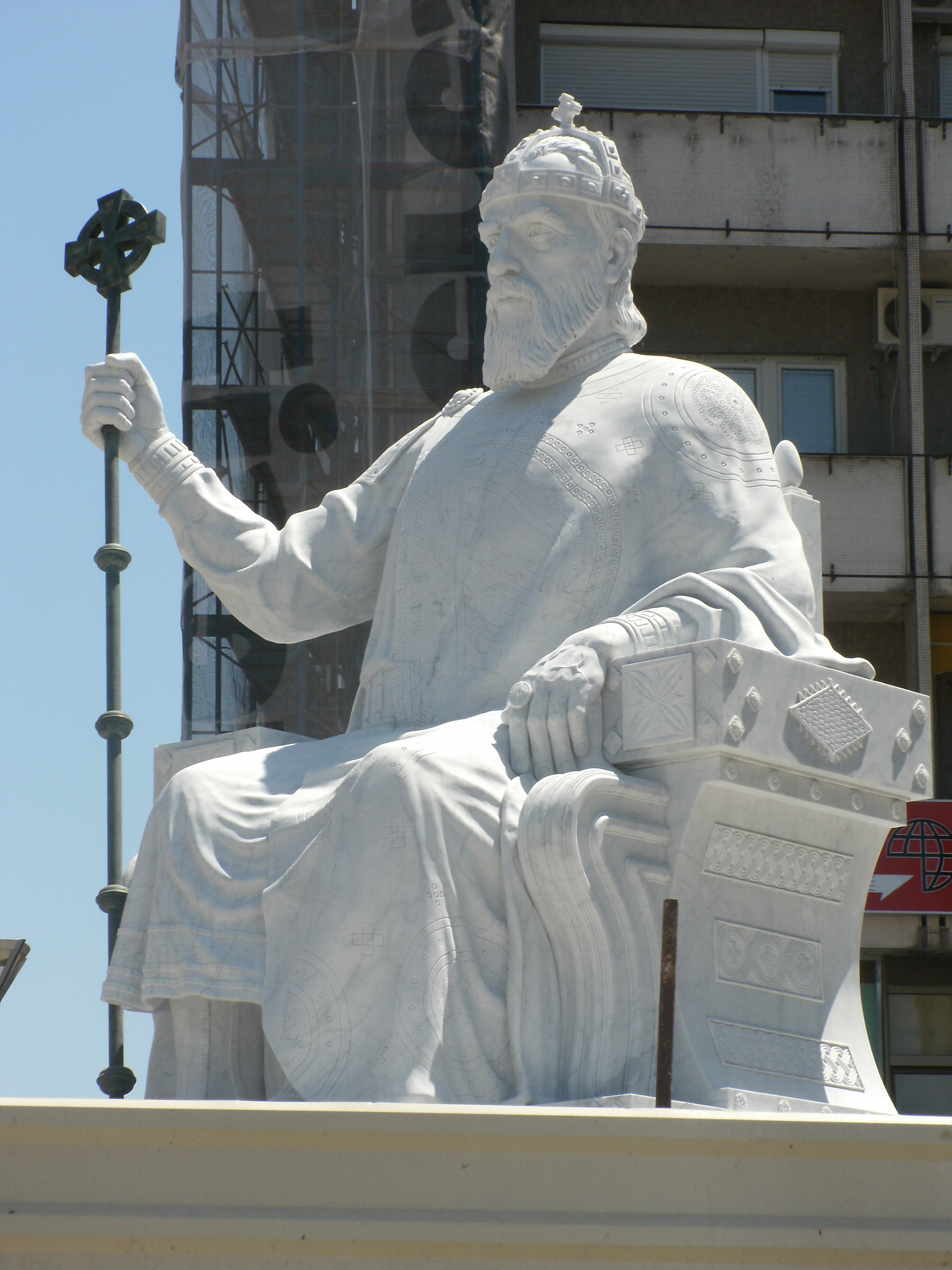
Tsar Samuil monument

The monument to Samuel of Bulgaria is among the new focal points of Macedonia Square. Officially unveiled on 28 June 2011, it is situated in front of the Pelister building, to the right of where Macedonia Street meets Macedonia Square.

The monument, mostly in white marble, consists of a depiction of Tsar Samuil sitting on a throne, totaling 5 m (16.4 ft) in height, and is placed on a pedestal which itself is a further 3.5 m (11.5 ft) tall. The reliefs on the sides of the pedestal are bronze. Tsar Samuil, in the monument, holds a scepter. Made in Florence, sculpted by hand in the Pietro Bazzanti e Figlio Art Gallery, the total cost of the Tsar Samuil monument was roughly €3.5 million.

Samuil's empire was centred within the territories of today's North Macedonia with Skopje and later Ohrid being the empire's capital. The fringe theory Samuil being the first Tsar of the Macedonian Slavs is held mainly in North Macedonia. This view is ahistorical, as it projects modern ethnic distinctions into the past.

==== Warrior monument ====
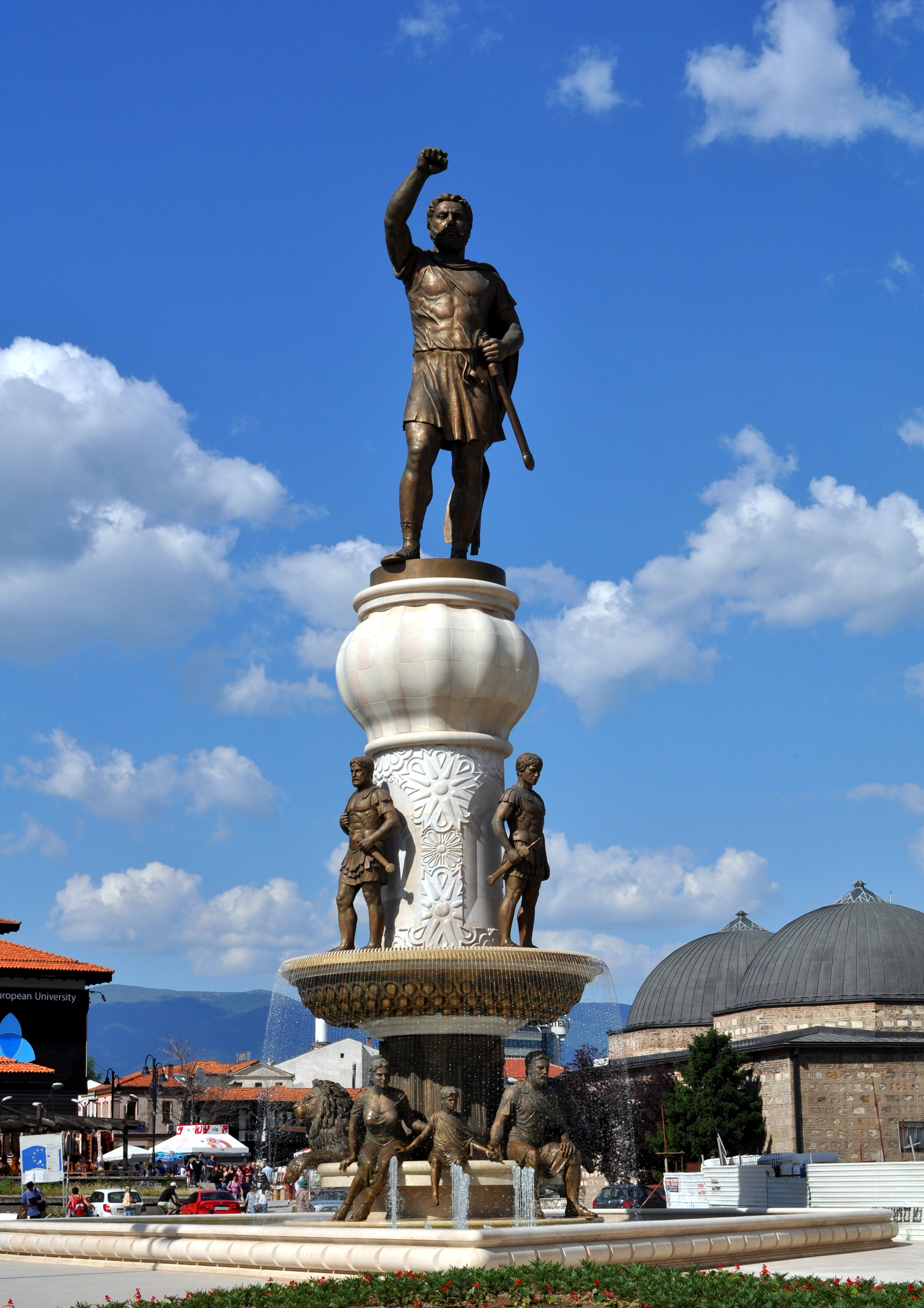
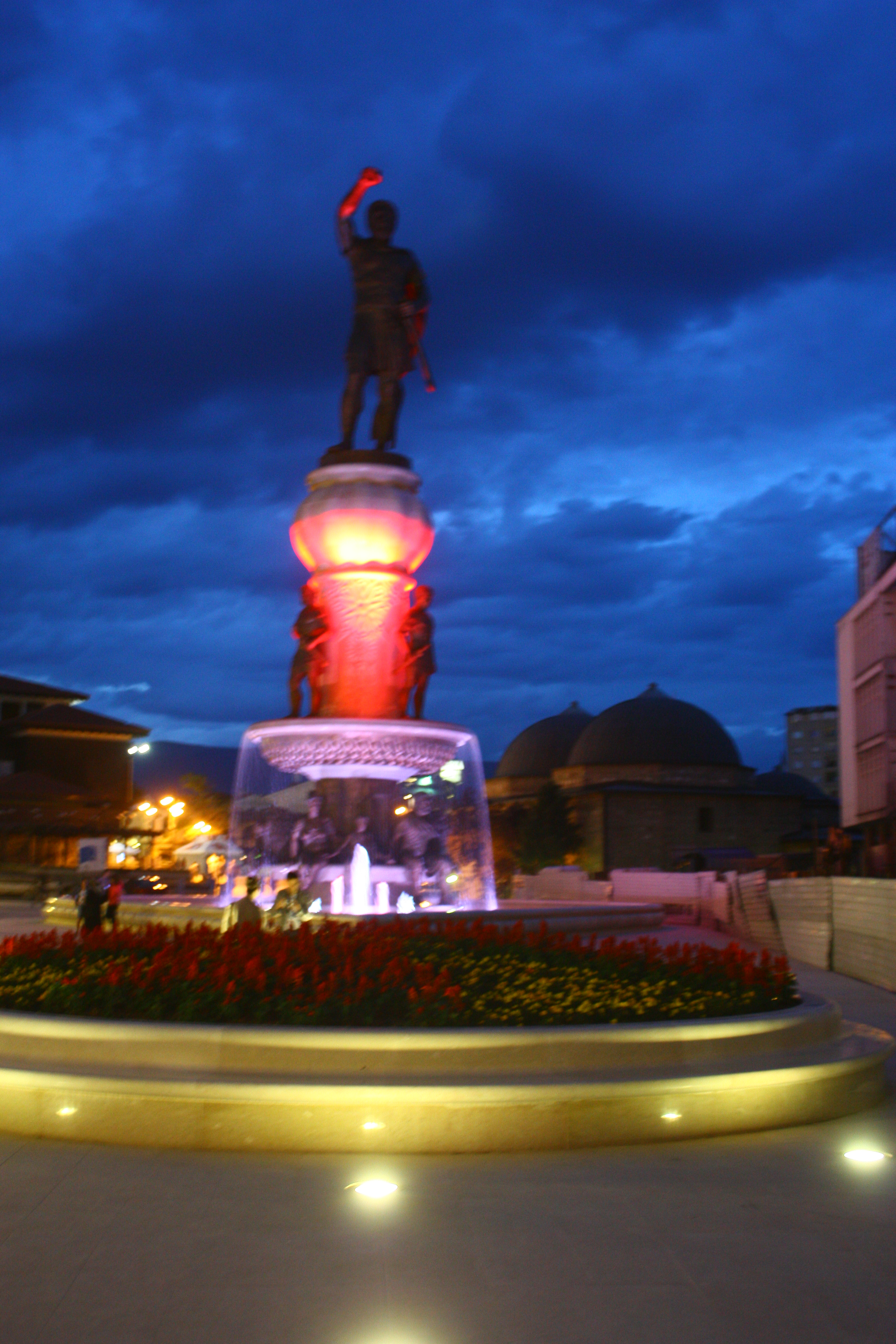
Warrior monument

On the opposite side of the Stone Bridge from Macedonia Square is Karpoš's Rebellion Square, which serves as a main entrance to the Old Bazaar. It is undergoing a major reconstruction, as part of Skopje 2014, and its new centerpiece will be the statue and fountain officially named "Warrior," though it is widely believed that the statue is a depiction of Philip II of Macedon, not to be confused with the equestrian statue of Philip II in Skopje's Avtokomanda neighborhood. The statue was placed onto the square on 22 May 2012.

Made in Vicenza, the statue is 15 m (49.2 ft) tall and is placed on a 13 m (42.7 ft) tall pedestal. The entire monument will cost roughly €2 million.

==== Warrior on Horseback monument ====
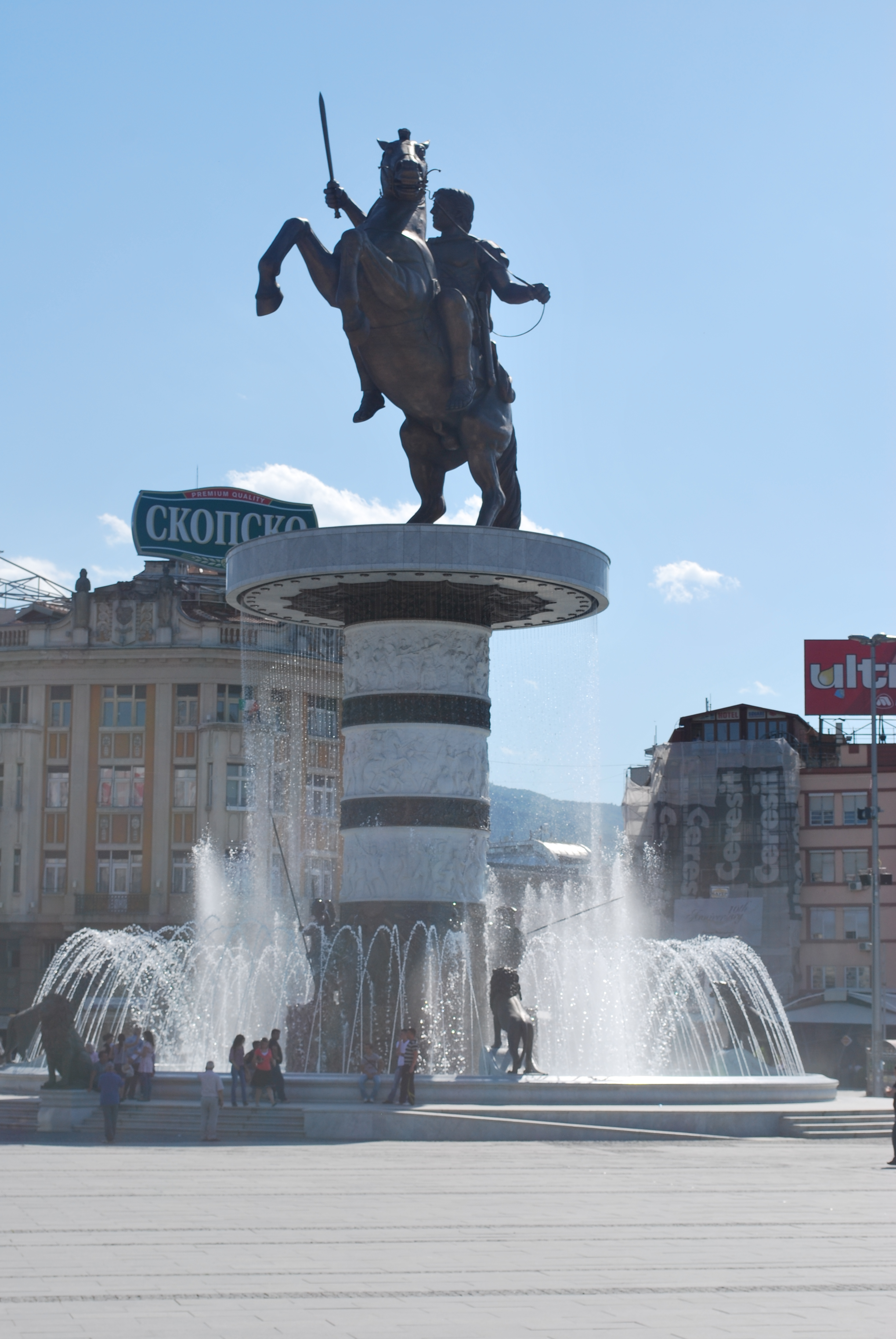
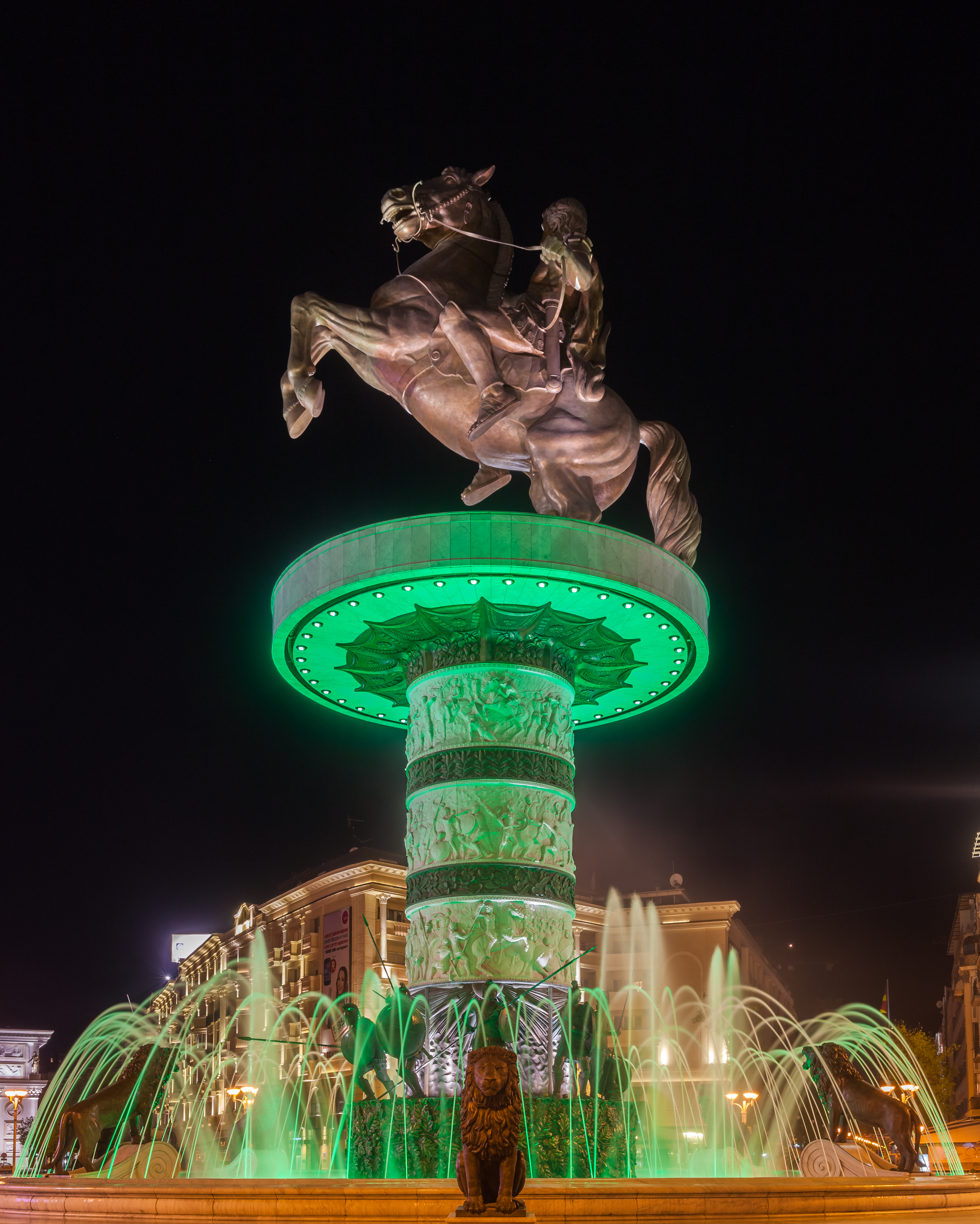
Warrior on Horseback monument

Perhaps the main symbol of the Skopje 2014 project is the Warrior on Horseback (Macedonian: Воин на коњ) statue and fountain in the centre of Macedonia Square. It was typically thought to depict Alexander the Great, though it was not officially named for him. A plaque was later added to the statue which confirmed that the statue was dedicated to Alexander the Great.

The statue was sculpted by Valentina Stevanovska and cast in bronze with lost wax casting technique in the Ferdinando Marinelli Artistic Foundry of Florence.

"Alexander" was officially completed on 8 September 2011 to commemorate 20 years of the independence of the Republic of Macedonia. It is 14.5 m (47.6 ft) tall and it sits on a cylindrical column, which itself is 10 m (32.8 ft) in height. The column consists of three large ivory sections, each separated by a thinner bronze ring. Each section contains reliefs. The column stands in a fountain. At the base of the column are eight bronze soldiers, each 3 m (9.8 ft) tall. There are also eight bronze lions, each 2.5 m (8.3 ft) tall, around the edges of the fountain pool, four of which act as part of the fountain, releasing water from their mouths. The fountain also plays music.

The total cost of the Warrior on Horseback monument is roughly €7.5 million.

==== Other monuments ====
Aside from the major monuments in the Skopje 2014 above, many other ones have been erected, or are planned to be erected in the city. These include the following:

Person/group depicted	Estimated cost (€)	Location	Reference	Image
Nexhat Agolli		Kej 13-ti Noemvri, in front of Makedonski Telekom headquarters		
Todor Aleksandrov	350,000	Češma Park, Municipality of Kisela Voda		
Metodija Andonov-Čento	800,000	Macedonia Square, in front of Trend building		
ASNOM	1.9 million	Žena Borec Park, across 11 October Street from Parliament Building		
Josif Bageri		in front of National Theatre		
Gemidzii	970,000	Macedonia Square, on Vardar Quay		
Pjetër Bogdani		Macedonia Square, near end of Stone Bridge		
Vasil Čakalarov	330,000	at intersection of Metropolitan Theodosius Gologanov Boulevard and Kosturski Heroi Street		
Dimitrija Čupovski	80,000 – 141,000	Macedonia Square		
Defenders of Macedonia (Fallen soldiers of the Insurgency in the Republic of Macedonia)	232,800 – 320,000	Žena Borec Park		
Goce Delčev	850,000	Macedonia Square, at end of Stone Bridge		
Dame Gruev	850,000	Macedonia Square, at end of Stone Bridge		
Pitu Guli	118,192	opposite the Parliament Building, Žena Borec Park		
Fallen Heroes of Macedonia	2.3 million	Žena Borec Park		
Founders of the Internal Macedonian Revolutionary Organization	1.2 million	Žena Borec Park		
Fountain of the Mothers of Macedonia		Karpoš's Rebellion Square		
Horses Fountain		Karpoš's Rebellion Square		
Kuzman Josifovski-Pitu		near Defenders of Macedonia monument		
Nikola Karev	715,000	in front of Parliament Building		
Karpoš	540,000	eastern bank of Vardar, in front of Museum of Archaeology		
Krste Misirkov	170,000 – 180,000	Krste Misirkov Park, near Appellate Court		
Gjorče Petrov	350,000	Municipality of Gjorče Petrov		
Warrior Monument	330,000	Avtokomanda		
Dimitar Popgeorgiev	67,000	Macedonia Square, in front of Narodna Banka Building		
Gjorgji Pulevski	142,000	eastern bank of Vardar, in front of Museum of the Macedonian Struggle, just north of Stone Bridge		
Saints Clement and Naum of Ohrid	580,000	eastern bank of Vardar, at end of Stone Bridge		
Saints Cyril and Methodius	540,000	eastern bank of Vardar, at end of Stone Bridge		
Jane Sandanski	250,000	Municipality of Aerodrom		
Boris Sarafov		near the Ministry of Foreign Affairs. The monument was dismantled in 2018 by the municipal authorities.		
Pavel Šatev		near the City Trade Center and Porta Macedonia		
Hristo Tatarčev		near intersection of Dimitrija Čupovski and 11 October Streets, near Porta Macedonia		
Hristo Uzunov	120,000	opposite Ministry of Justice, on Dimitrija Čupovski Street		

=== Miscellaneous ===
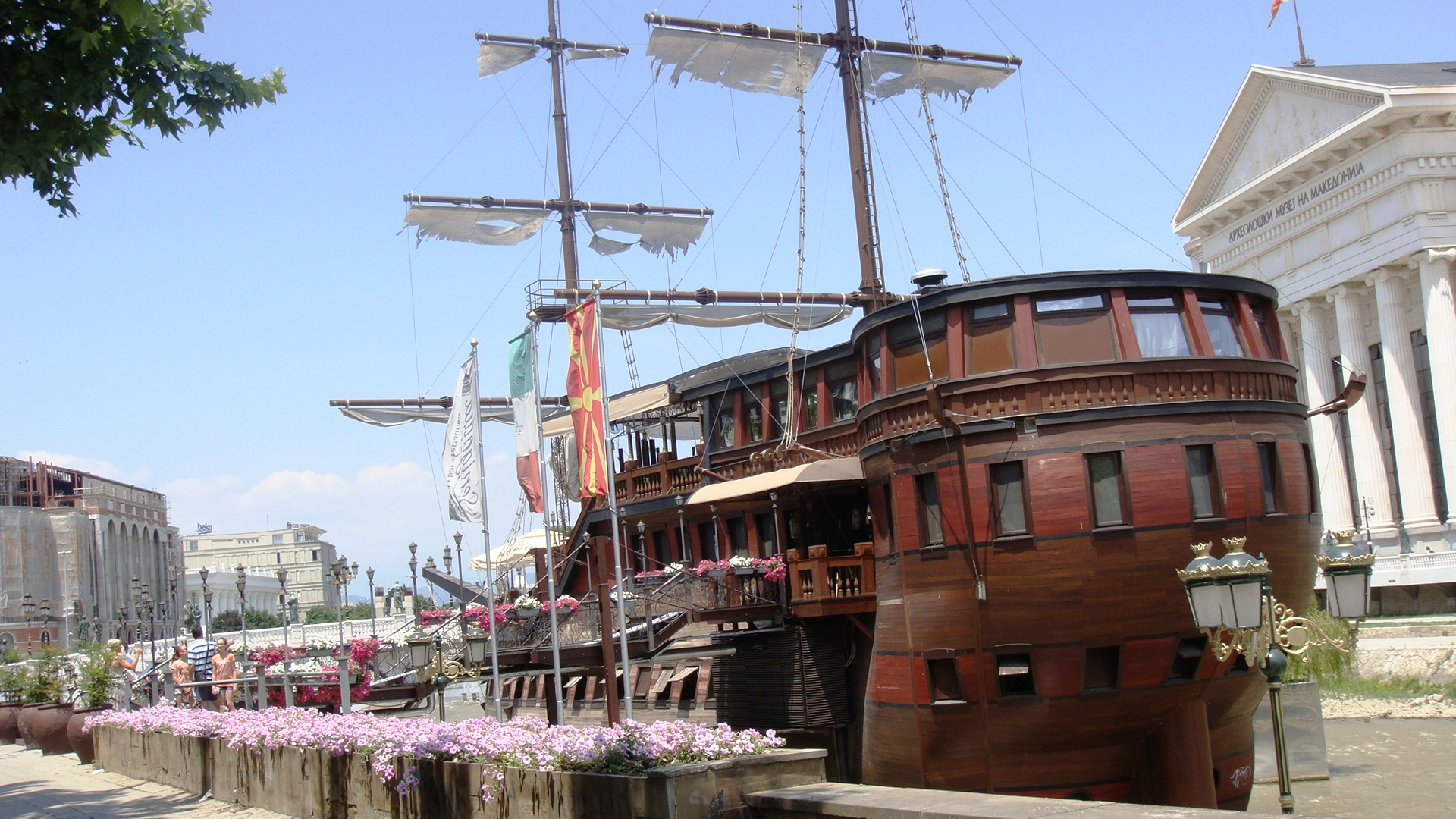
One of building-boats in the Vardar River

==== Docked boats in Vardar River ====
The first of four building-boats as restaurants and cafes just in the Vardar River opened in July 2014. The boats are erected into the riverbed and, thus, will remain in their planned spots permanently. The boats, all to be situated in central Skopje, were intended to be in the Baroque style.

==== Ferris wheel ====
The erection of a Ferris wheel is foreseen on the Vardar River. It will require the construction of a new pedestrian bridge, to run from the Museum of the Macedonian Struggle to the MEPSO Building, upon which it will stand. No final plan for the project has been approved.

In 2020, following the cancellation of construction on the Ferris wheel, the completed bridge was opened to pedestrians.

==== Fountains in Vardar River ====
The addition of fountains on the Vardar River was planned early on in the project. They were completed in 2010. The fountains have been criticized for reportedly releasing mud, as well as for acting as a filter for trash flowing down the river.

==== Kale Fortress reconstruction ====
Director of Cultural Heritage and archaeologist Pasko Kuzman has announced a plan to restore and reconstruct the Kale Fortress. The plan also includes the construction of a museum to house Byzantine archaeological finds from the fortress, as well as reconstructions of a prehistoric house and an Ottoman guard tower to be built on the place of their ruins. Souvenir shops and cafes are also foreseen additions. The most controversial part of the restoration of the fortress is the construction of a church, which has been protested by ethnic Albanians.

==== Karpoš's Rebellion Square reconstruction ====
Karpoš's Rebellion Square is situated opposite the Vardar River of Macedonia Square and is undergoing a significant reconstruction. Plans include the erection of a statue and fountain depicting Philip II of Macedon, though officially named "Warrior," at the far northeast side of the square. Another monument consisting of a fountain and statues representing the Mothers of Macedonia is being constructed in front of the Warrior monument. In front of this will be two monuments, also consisting of a fountain and statues, depicting horses. The two will be situated on either side of the entrance to the square from the Stone Bridge.

The office building

==== Office building on Macedonia Square ====
A new office building was constructed on the south side of Macedonia Square, on the Vardar Quay. It stands on the same place as the former headquarters of the National Bank, which was destroyed in the 1963 Skopje earthquake. The new office building is similar in shape to the former bank building, though it is not in the neoclassical style, which also makes it somewhat unusual in the Skopje 2014 project.

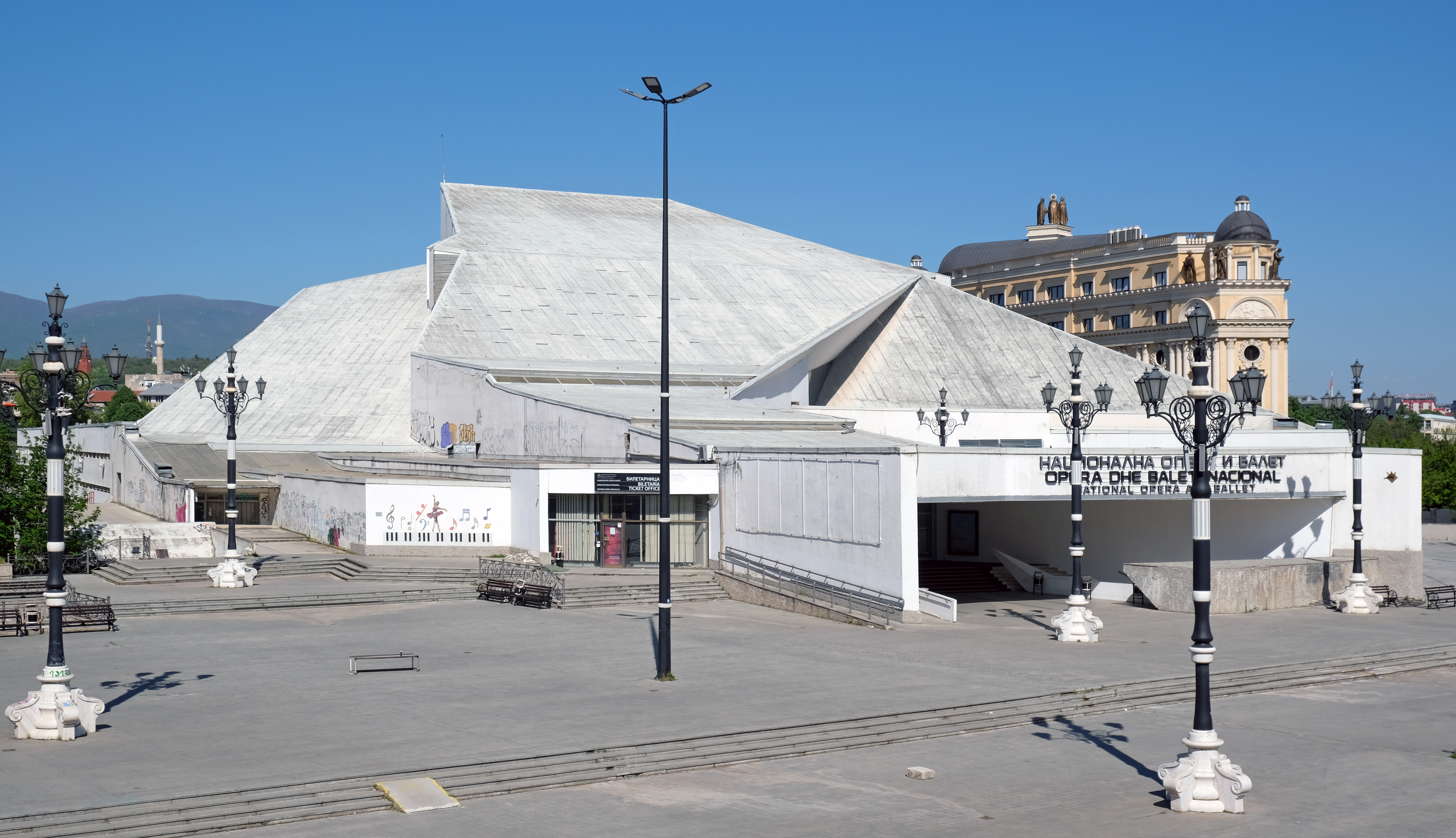
Macedonian Opera

==== Skanderbeg Square ====
An existing statue of Skanderbeg, an important historical figure to ethnic Albanians, is the main fixture of a square that bears his name in Skopje's Čair Municipality. The square's total cost is estimated at around €10 million and was completed in 2018. The square covers 28,000 m^{2} (301,389 ft^{2}) and extends from the Macedonian Philharmonic and Macedonian Opera to the Old Bazaar. To accommodate construction a portion of the square was built on top of Goce Delčev Boulevard. Aside from plenty open space, the square contains an amphitheatre, a fountain, and underground parking.

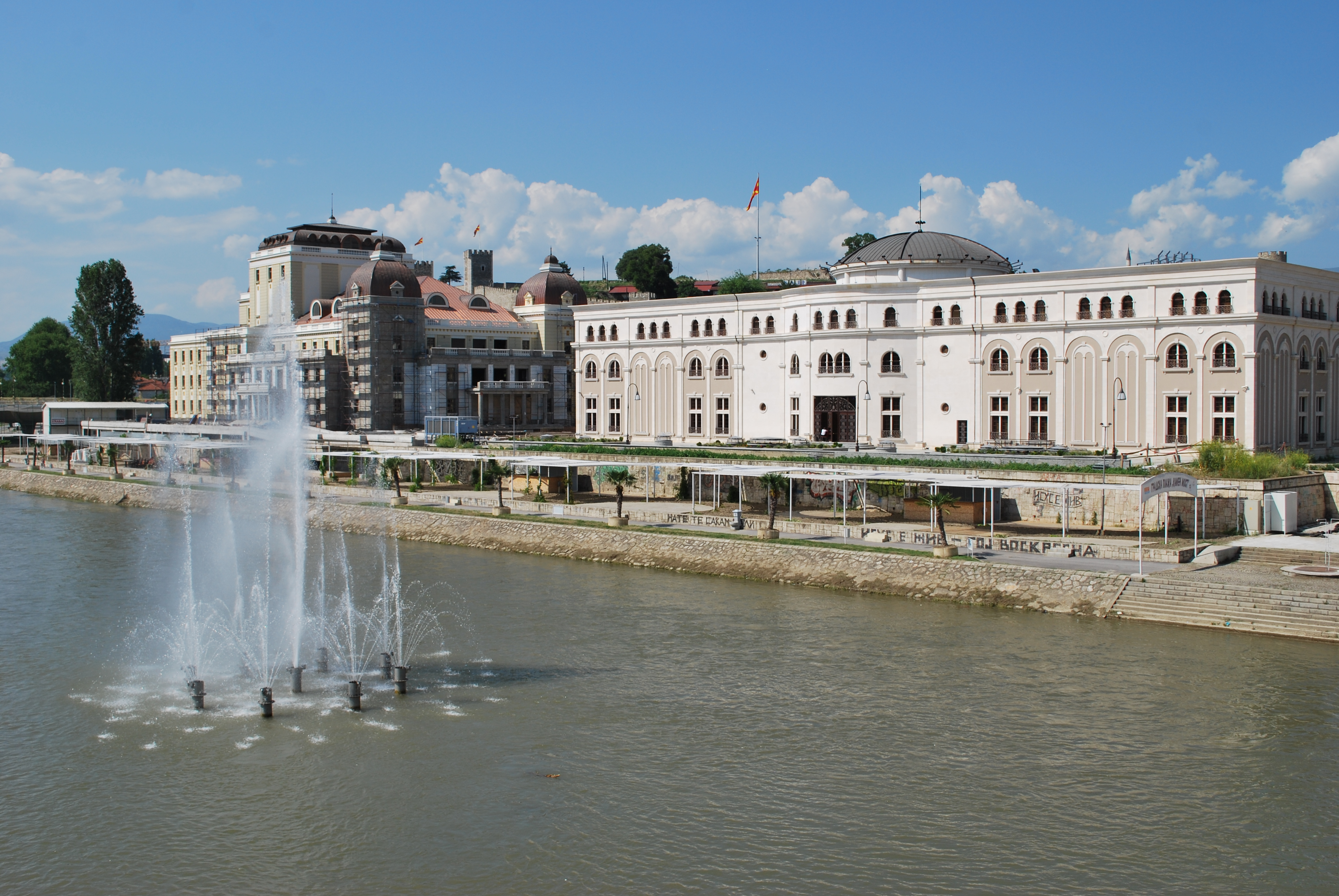
One of the Vardar River fountains

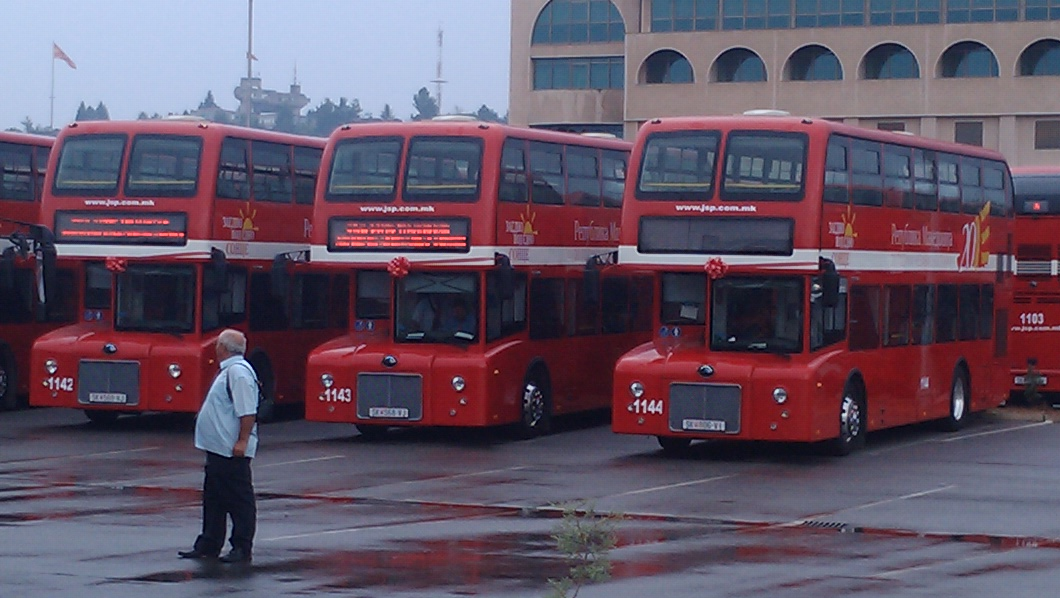
Double decker buses

==== Other ====
Other components of Skopje 2014 include the following:

- 202 double-decker city buses, like London, in city's routes.
- Three willow trees planted in the Vardar River in central Skopje.
- The restoration of buildings in the historic Old Bazaar.
- Hotels, including a Marriott Hotel constructed in May 2016 on Macedonia Square.
- Parking garages.

== See also ==
- Macedonian nationalism
- VMRO-DPMNE
