= Agolli =

Agolli is a surname. Notable people with the surname include:

- Ansi Agolli (born 1982), Albanian footballer
- Dritëro Agolli (1931–2017), Albanian writer
- Ervis Agolli (born 1982), Albanian footballer
- Esma Agolli (1928–2010), Albanian actress
- Lejla Agolli (born 1950), Albanian composer
- Nexhat Agolli (1914–1949), Albanian politician
