= Nexhat Agolli =

Yugoslav Politician

- Born: 9 June 1914; Debar, Kingdom of Serbia
- Died: 28 April 1949 (aged 34); Goli Otok, FPR Yugoslavia
- Political party: Communist Party of Yugoslavia

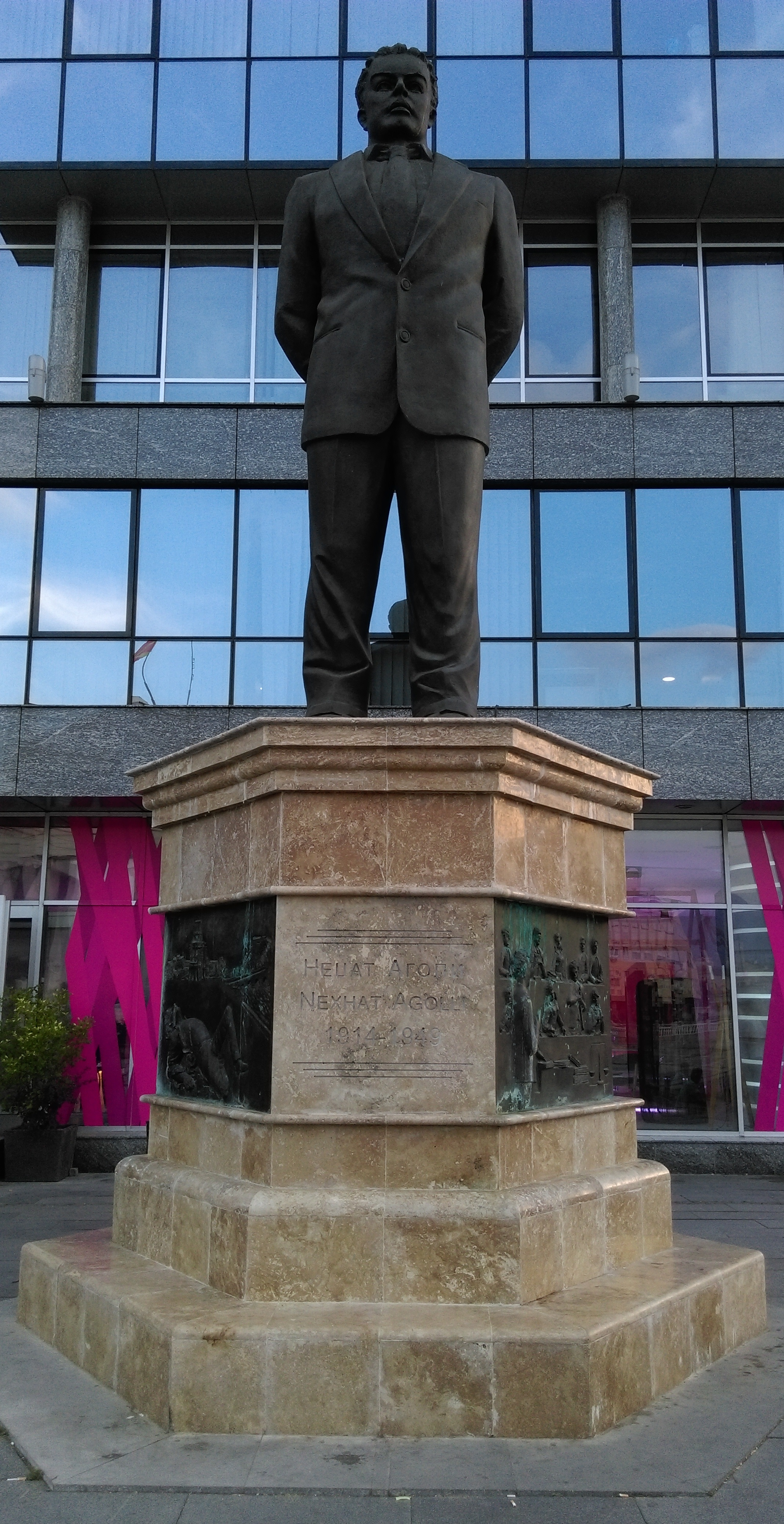
Monument dedicated to Nexhat Agolli in Skopje.

Nexhat Agolli (1914–1949) was a Yugoslav Albanian jurist and politician. He served as Deputy President of the Anti-Fascist Assembly for the People's Liberation of Macedonia (ASNOM) in 1944; and, after World War II, as Minister of Social Works of Macedonia. In 1949, he was arrested for opposing Josip Broz Tito's Informbiro policies, and died while imprisoned.

== Life ==
Born in Debar, Kingdom of Serbia, Agolli studied in Krumë, Tirana and Rome, where he later worked as an assistant professor of law at the Sapienza University of Rome. In 1942 he joined the communist National Liberation Movement of Albania and served in Albanian and Bulgarian occupation zones of Yugoslavia (modern Montenegro, Kosovo, Serbia and Macedonia). In December 1944 he was elected deputy president of ASNOM. When the Communist Party of Yugoslavia was expelled from the Cominform in 1948, Agolli supported the pro-Soviet factions with the party. He was convicted and sent to the political prison at Goli Otok, where he died on April 28, 1949.
