= Russian sloop Mirny =

Ship of the First Russian Antarctic Expedition in 1819–1821

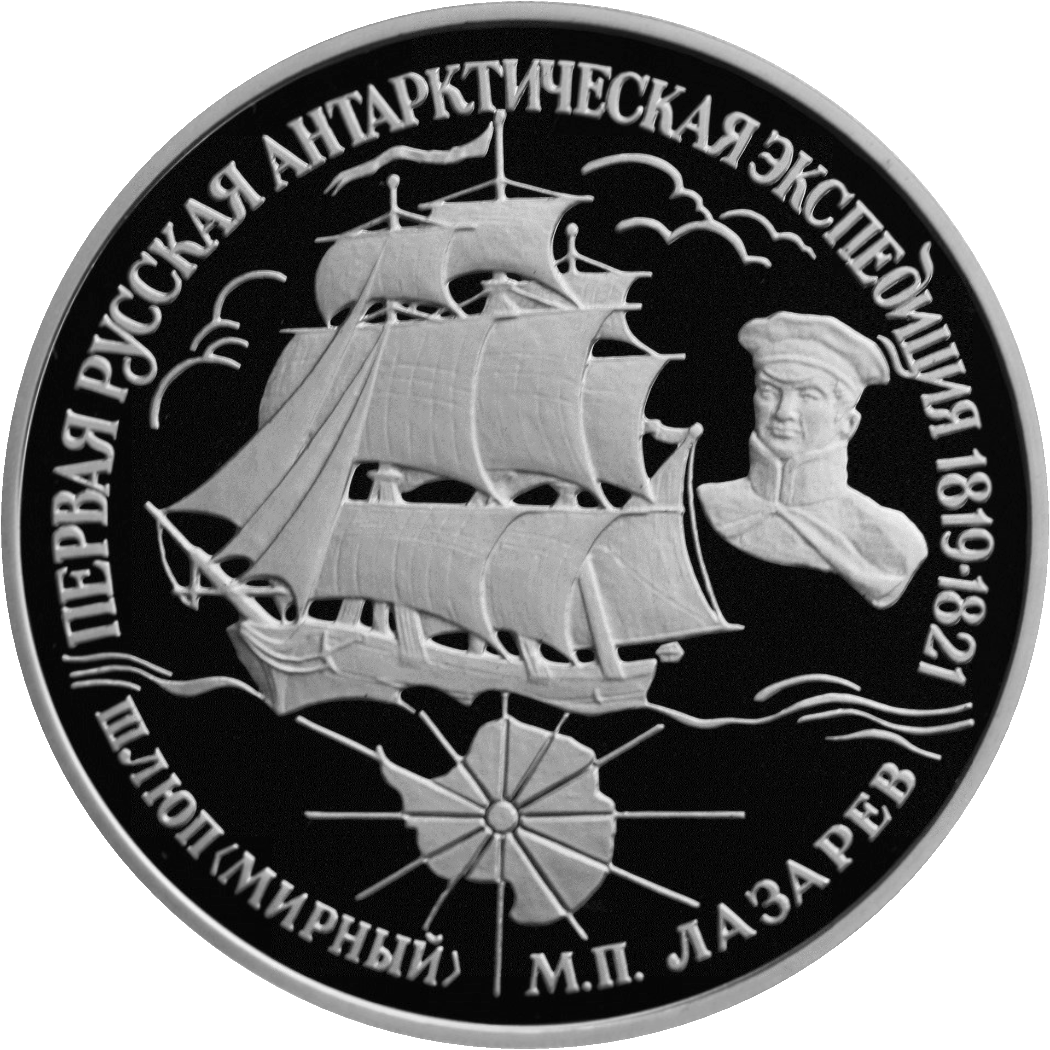
- Mirny and its Captain Mikhail Lazarev on a commemorative coin of the Bank of Russia

History

Russian Empire
- Name: Mirny
- Namesake: Peaceful
- Builder: Mikhail Lazarev (oversaw refit of the original ship Ladoga), Olonetskaya Shipyards, Lodeynoye Pole
- Laid down: 1818
- Launched: 1819
- Christened: Ladoga
- Maiden voyage: 1819
- Renamed: Mirny
- Home port: Kronshtadt

General characteristics
- Type: 24-gun sloop-of-war
- Displacement: 530 tonnes
- Length: 36.6 m (120.1 ft)
- Beam: 9.15 m (30.0 ft)
- Depth of hold: 4.6 m (15.1 ft)
- Sail plan: Full-rigged ship
- Speed: 10 kn (19 km/h)
- Complement: 72
- Armament: 6 × 120 mm carronade; 14 × 76 mm pounders

Mirny (Russian: Ми́рный, lit. 'peaceful') was a 20-gun sloop-of-war of the Imperial Russian Navy, the second ship of the First Russian Antarctic Expedition in 1819–1821, during which Fabian Gottlieb von Bellingshausen (commander of the lead ship Vostok) and Mikhail Lazarev (commanding Mirny) circumnavigated the globe, discovered the continent of Antarctica and twice circumnavigated it, and discovered a number of islands and archipelagos in the Southern Ocean and the Pacific.

== History ==
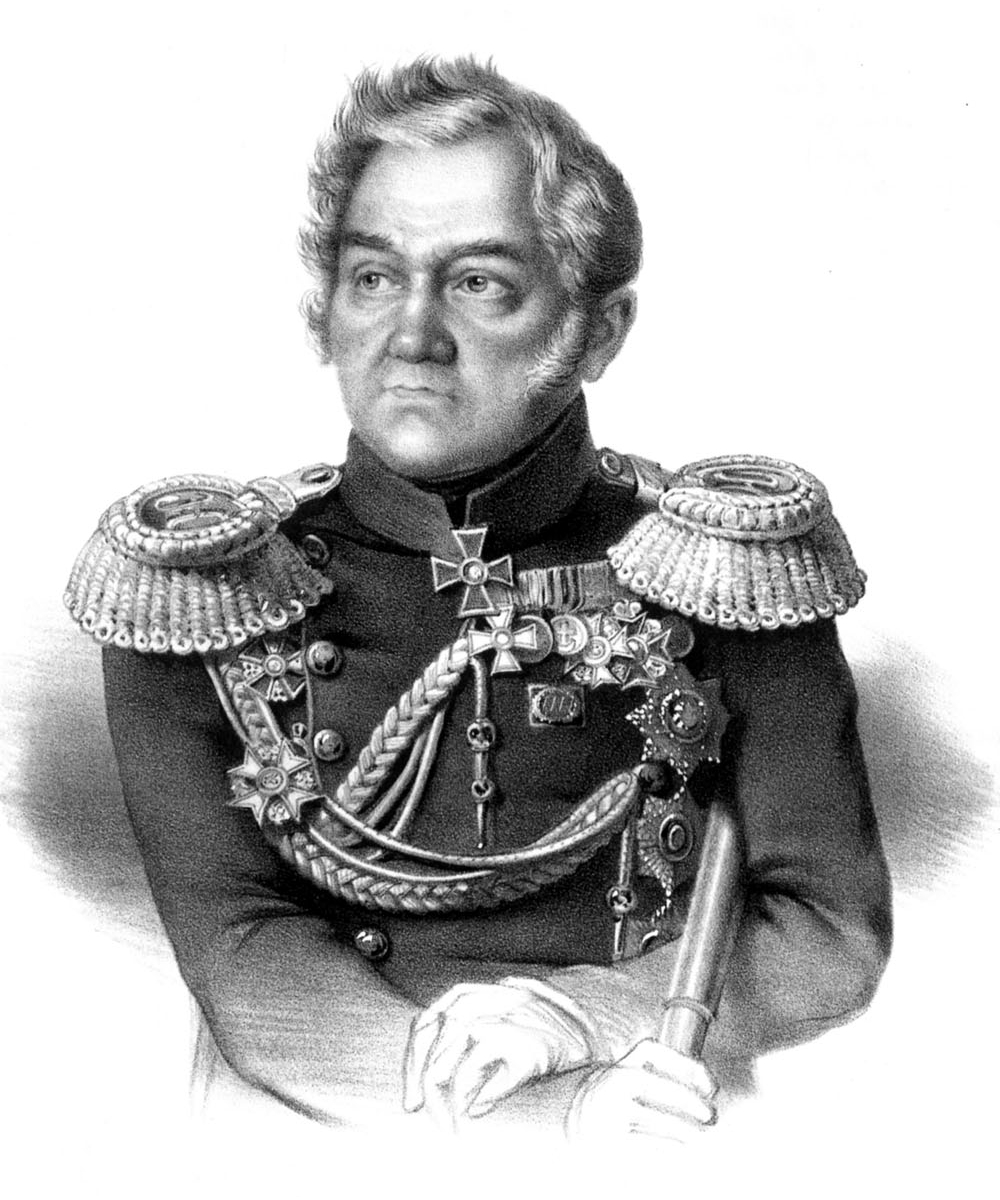
Mikhail Lazarev, captain of Mirny.

Mirny was under construction in 1818 at Olonetskaya Shipyards, Lodeynoye Pole. It was initially named Ladoga (after Lake Ladoga), but when the need arose for a new ship for an Antarctic expedition, the decision was taken not to build a completely new one, but to refit Ladoga. It was reconstructed under surveillance of its future commander Mikhail Lazarev.

On 14 July [O.S. 3 July] 1819 Vostok under the captaincy of Commander Fabian Gottlieb von Bellingshausen, the leader of the expedition, alongside Mirny under the command of Lieutenant Commander Mikhail Lazarev left Kronshtadt and on 28 January [O.S. 16 January] 1820 reached the shore of Antarctica, which was sighted for the first time in history. After repair in Sydney in Australia, the expedition explored the tropical parts of the Pacific, and on 12 November [O.S. 31 October] 1820 again turned to Antarctica. On 22 January [O.S. 10 January] 1821 the sloops reached the southernmost point of their voyage at 69° 53' S and 92° 19' W. On 5 August [O.S. 24 July] 1821 they returned to Kronshtadt.

In 751 days they covered 49 723 miles (approx. 92 300 km). Apart from the discovery of the world's sixth continent, Antarctica, 29 islands were mapped and complex oceanographic works carried out. A medal was issued by the Russian Admiralty to commemorate the expedition.

== Named in honor ==
- Mirny Rupes, a mountain chain on planet Mercury.
- Mirny Peak, a prominent peak, 750 m, 4 nautical miles (7 km) northeast of Enigma Peak in the north part of Rothschild Island, presumably first seen from a distance in 1821 by the First Russian Antarctic Expedition.
- Mirny Station, a Russian Antarctic research station on the coast of the Davis Sea, established on February 13, 1956 by the 1st Soviet Antarctic Expedition.
- Mirny Peninsula, on which Mirny Station is located.

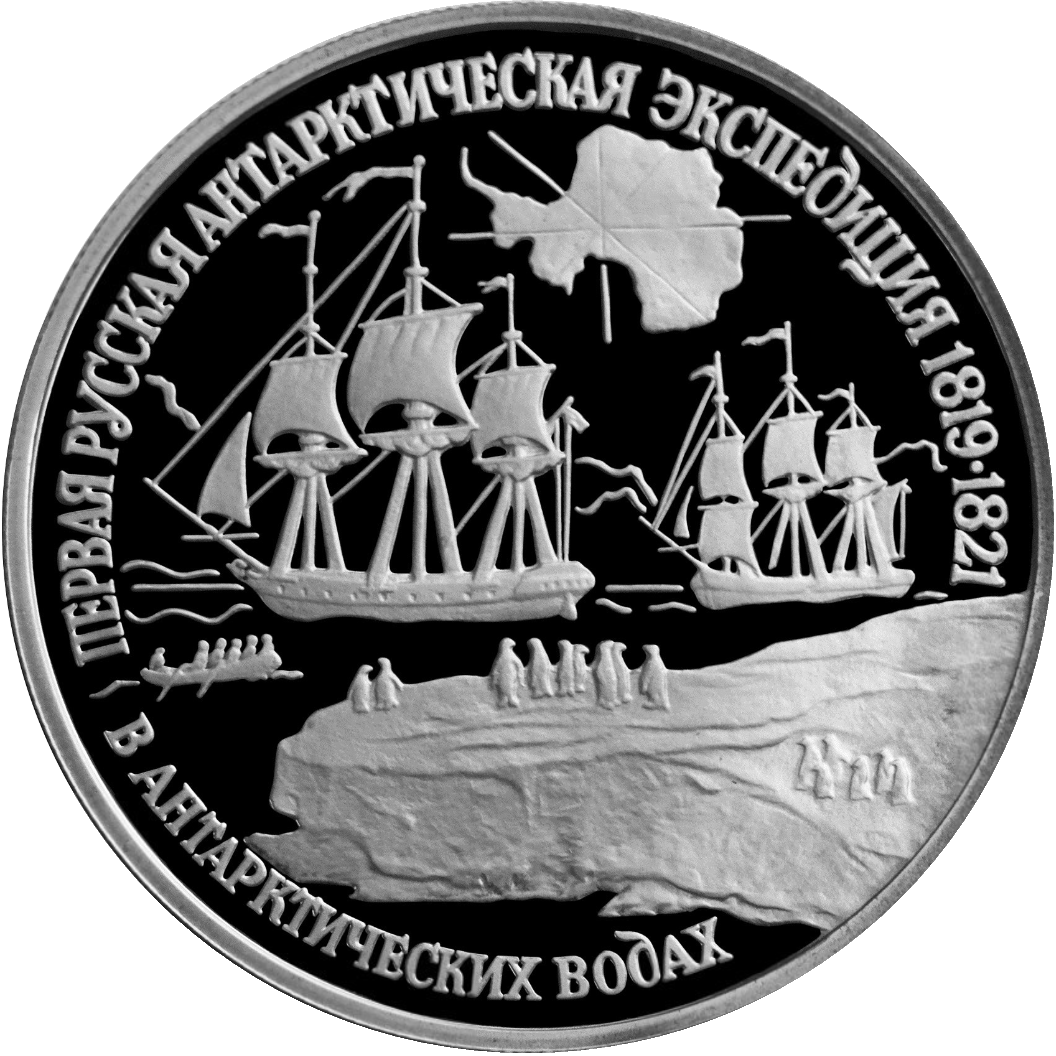
Vostok (left) and Mirny (right) during the First Russian Antarctic Expedition on a coin of the Bank of Russia
