= USCGC Eagle Commanding Officers =

List of naval commanders

Commanding Officer of USCGC Eagle (WIX-327)
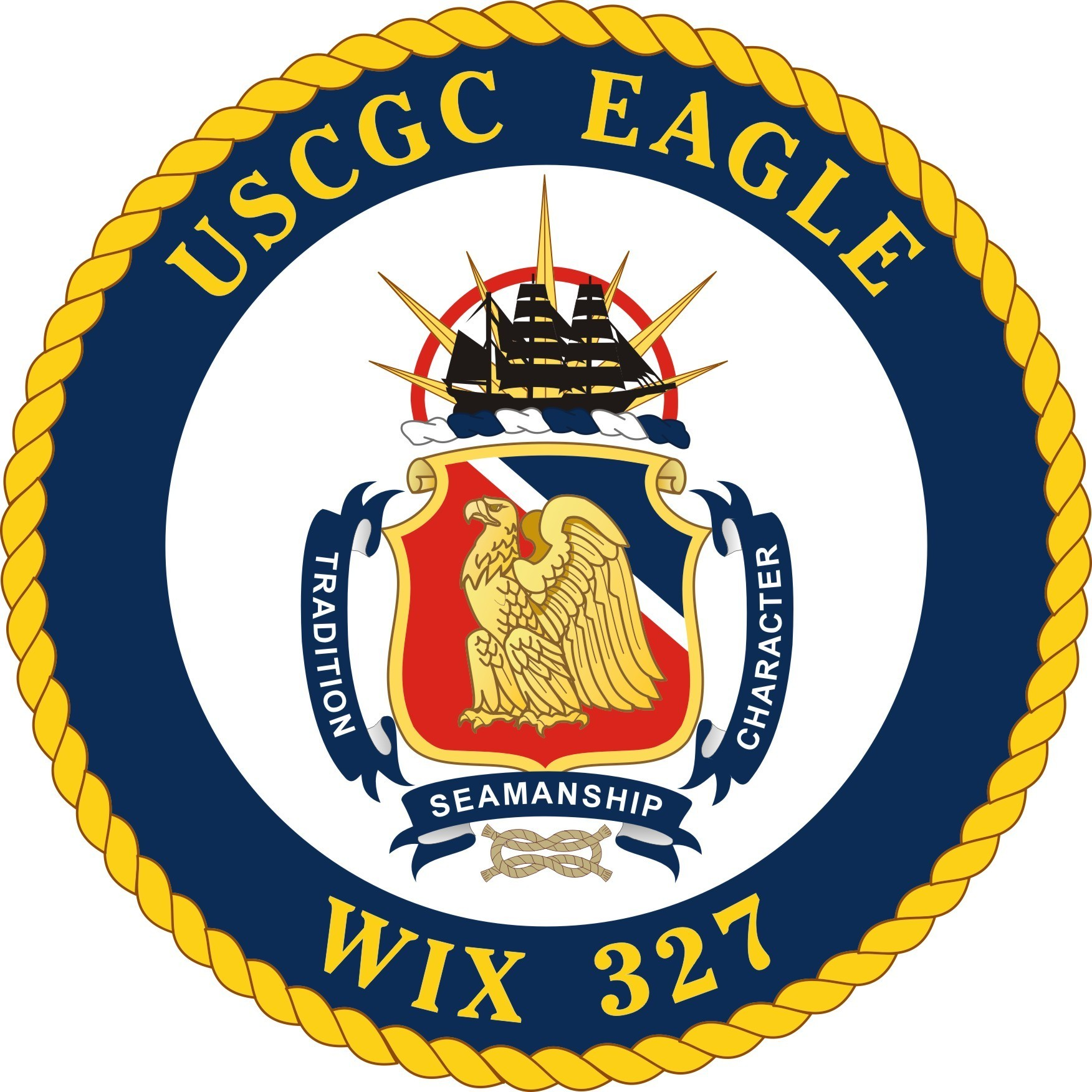

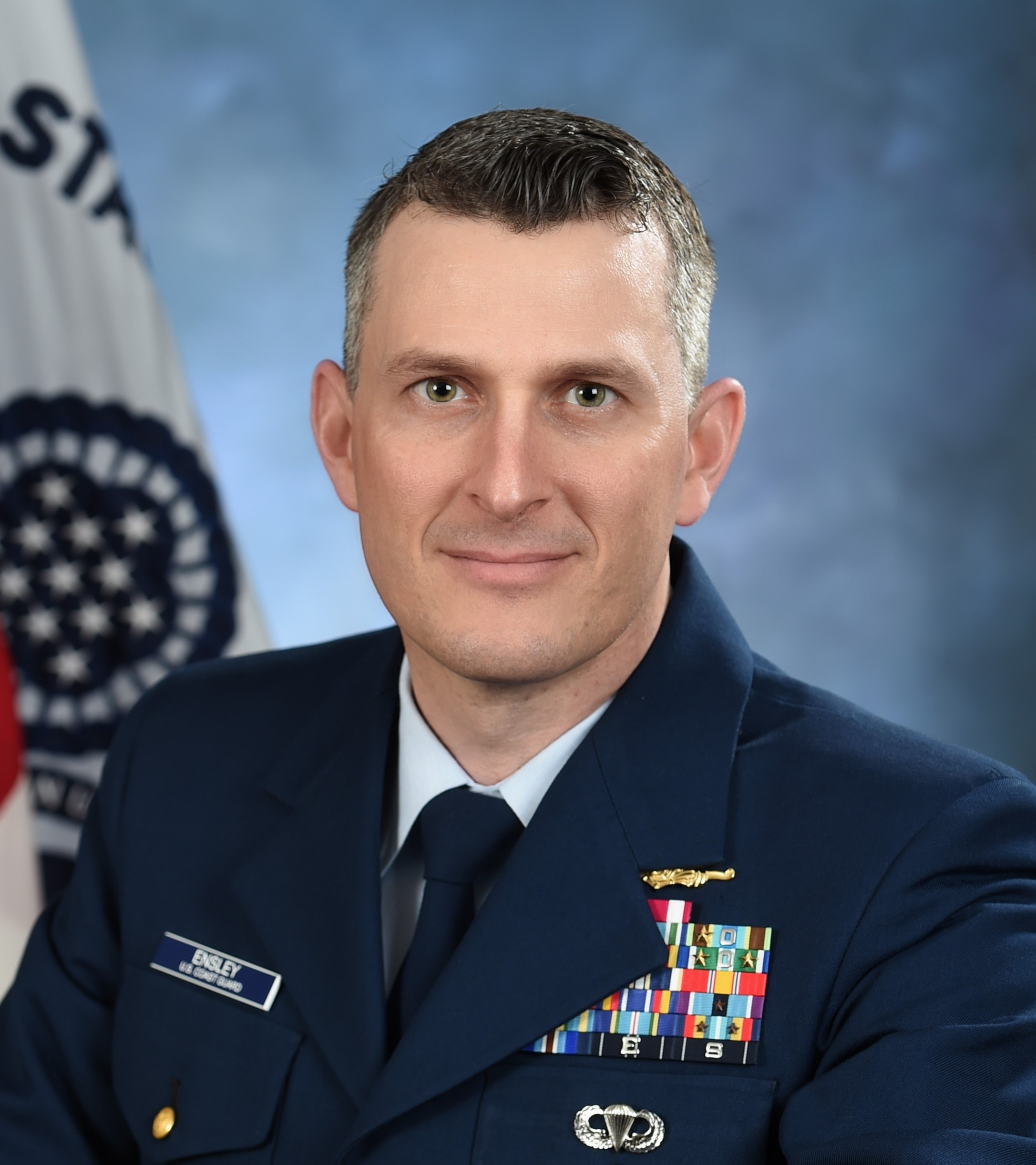
- Incumbent; CAPT Kristopher Ensley since 27 June 2025
- United States Coast Guard
- Style: Captain
- Reports to: USCG LANTAREA
- First holder: CDR Gordon P. McGowan
- Unofficial names: EAGLE
- Deputy: LCDR Andrew Horvath, XO
- Website: uscga.edu/mission/eagle

The following is a list of Commanding Officers of USCGC Eagle (WIX-327). There have been a total of 32 Eagle captains during her 80 years under USCG commission, and five during her 10 years of commission as Horst Wessel under the Kriegsmarine.

Many of Eagle's past commanders have gone on to serve with distinction, include ADM Robert J. Papp Jr., who served as the 24th Commandant of the Coast Guard from 2010–2014, and VADM James C. Irwin, who served as vice commandant from 1986 to 1988. In all, nine former Eagle commanders and two Horst Wessel commanders achieved flag rank.

Horst Wessel's first commander, German VADM August Thiele served with distinction as commander, Kampfgruppe Thiele during WW2, earning the Knight's Cross with Oak Leaves, and KADM Kurt Weyher continued in the Imperial German Navy tradition of Count Luckner as a merchant raider, earning the post-war Great Cross of Merit.

== KMS Horst Wessel ==
(Rank at assumption of command)

- Kapitan zur See August Thiele, 1936–1938
- Korvettenkapitan Kurt Weyher, January 1939 – September 1939
- Kapitanleutnant Martin Kretschmar, March 1940 – May 1940
- Fregattenkapitan Peter E. Eiffe, March 1941 – November 1942
- Kapitanleutnant Berthold Schnibbe, November 1942 – May 1945

== USCGC Barque Eagle ==
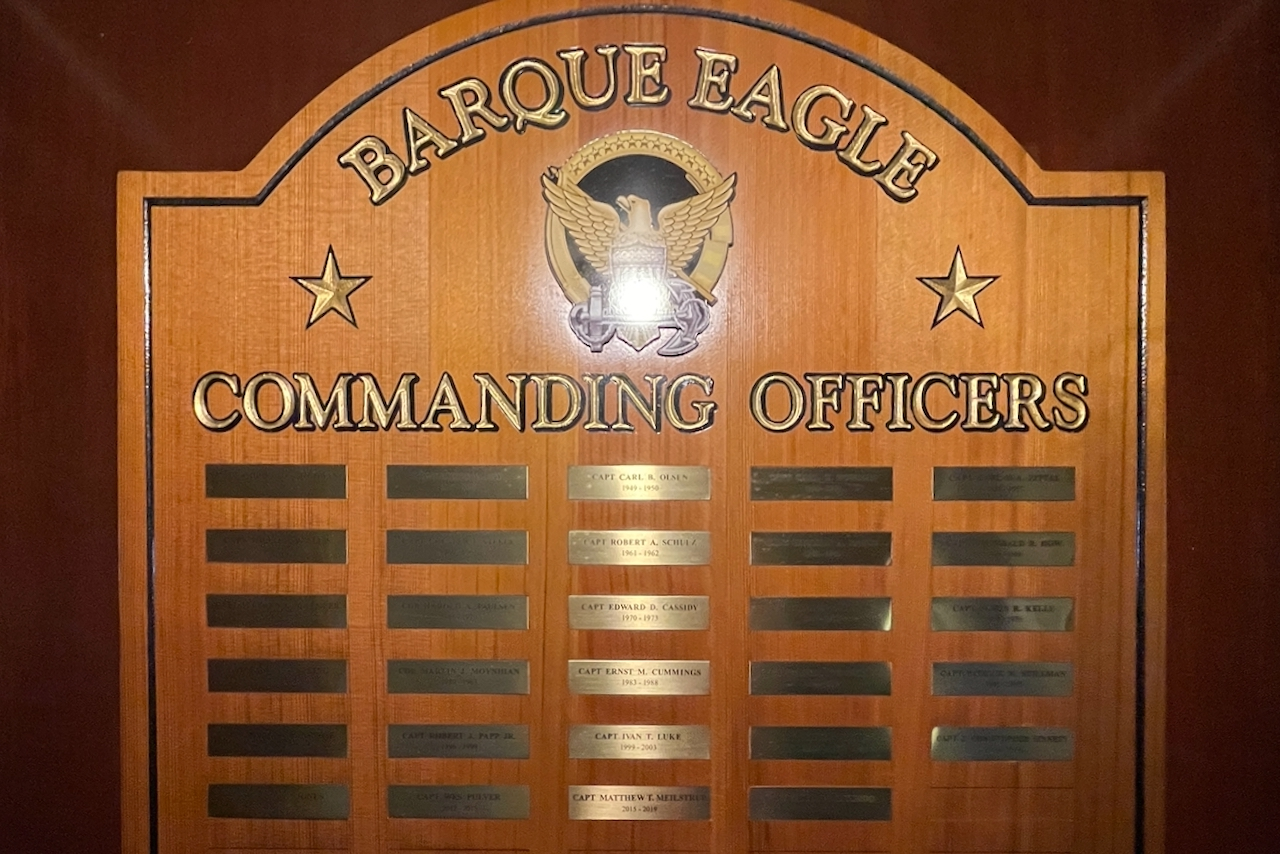
Plaque of Eagle COs in Eagle's flag cabin as of 2020

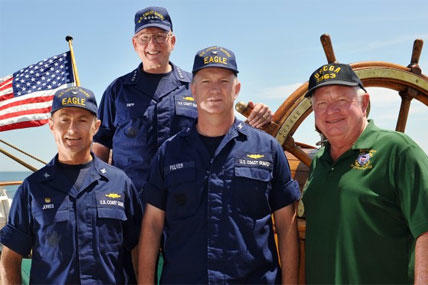
Four generations of Eagle COs, (L-R) CAPT Jones, ADM Papp, CAPT Pulver, CAPT(ret) Cummings, 2012

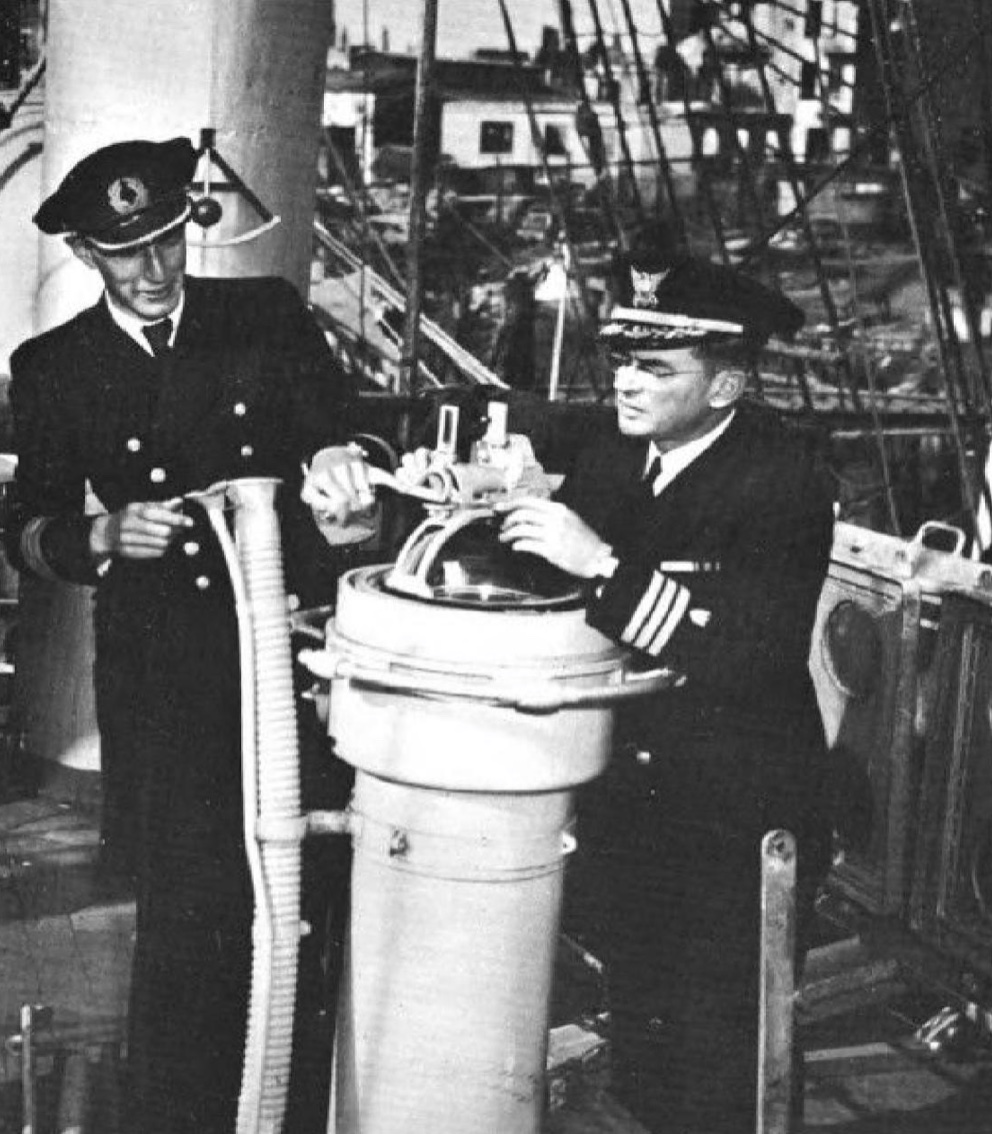
KptLt Berthold Schnibbe (left) with CDR Gordon P. McGowan in Bremerhaven, 1946

(Rank at assumption of command)

No	Name	Years	Notes	Refs
1	CDR Gordon P. McGowan	1946–1947	First Eagle CO	
2	CAPT Miles Imlay	1947–1948	Later	
3	CAPT Carl B. Olsen	1949-1950	Later	
4	CAPT Carl B. Bowman	1950–1954		
5	CAPT Karl O. A. Zittel	1954–1958		
6	CAPT William B. Ellis	1959	Later	
7	CAPT Chester I. Steele	1960–1961	Later	
8	CDR Robert A. Schulz	1961–1962		
9	CAPT William K. Earle	1963–1965		
10	LCDR Peter A. Morrill	1965		
11	CDR Archibald B. How	1965–1967		
12	CAPT Stephen G. Carkeek	1967		
13	CAPT Harold A. Paulsen	1968–1971		
14	CAPT Edward D. Cassidy	1972–1973		
15	CAPT James C. Irwin	1974–1975	Later	
16	CAPT James R. Kelly	1975–1976		
17	CAPT Paul A. Welling	1976–1980	Later	
18	CAPT Martin J. Moynihan	1980–1983		
19	CAPT Ernst M. Cummings	1983–1988		
20	CAPT David V.V. Wood	1988–1992		
21	CAPT Patrick Stillman	1992–1995	Later	
22	CAPT Donald R. Grosse	1995–1996		
23	CAPT Robert J. Papp Jr.	1996–1999	Later	
24	CAPT Ivan T. Luke	1999-2003		
25	CAPT Eric Shaw	2003–2006		
26	CAPT Joseph C. Sinnett	2006–2009		
27	CAPT Eric Jones	2009–2012	Later	
28	CAPT Raymond "Wes" Pulver	2012–2015		
29	CAPT Matthew Meilstrup	2015–2019		
30	CAPT Michael Turdo	2019–2022		
31	CAPT Jessica Rozzi-Ochs	2022–2025	First female CO	
32	CAPT Kristopher Ensley	2025–		
