= Cheesman Island =

Island in Palmer Land, Antarctica

- Location within Antarctica

Geography
- Location: Antarctica
- Coordinates: 69°44′S 75°5′W

Administration
- Administered under the Antarctic Treaty System

Demographics
- Population: Uninhabited

Cheesman Island is a small rocky island off the north coast of Charcot Island, 1.9 kilometres (1 nmi) north of Mount Martine. It was first seen and photographed from the air in 1929 by Sir Hubert Wilkins, who roughly positioned it. It was remapped from air photos taken by U.S. Navy Operation Highjump, 1946–47, by D. Searle of the Falkland Islands Dependencies Survey in 1960. The name was suggested by the Advisory Committee on Antarctic Names in 1950 for S.A. Cheesman, pilot on Wilkins' 1929 flight.

== See also ==
- List of Antarctic and sub-Antarctic islands
