= Mount Martin =

Mount Martin may refer to:

- Mount Martin (Alaska), a stratovolcano in Alaska, United States
- Mount Martin (Antarctica), a mountain in Antarctica
- Mount Martin (British Columbia), a mountain in British Columbia, Canada
- Mount Martin (Yukon), a mountain in Yukon, Canada
- Mount Martin, Queensland, a town in Queensland, Australia
- Mont Martin in Quebec, Canada

== See also ==
- Mount Martine
- Mount Martyn
