= Marion Nunataks =

Coordinates: 69°45′S 75°15′W

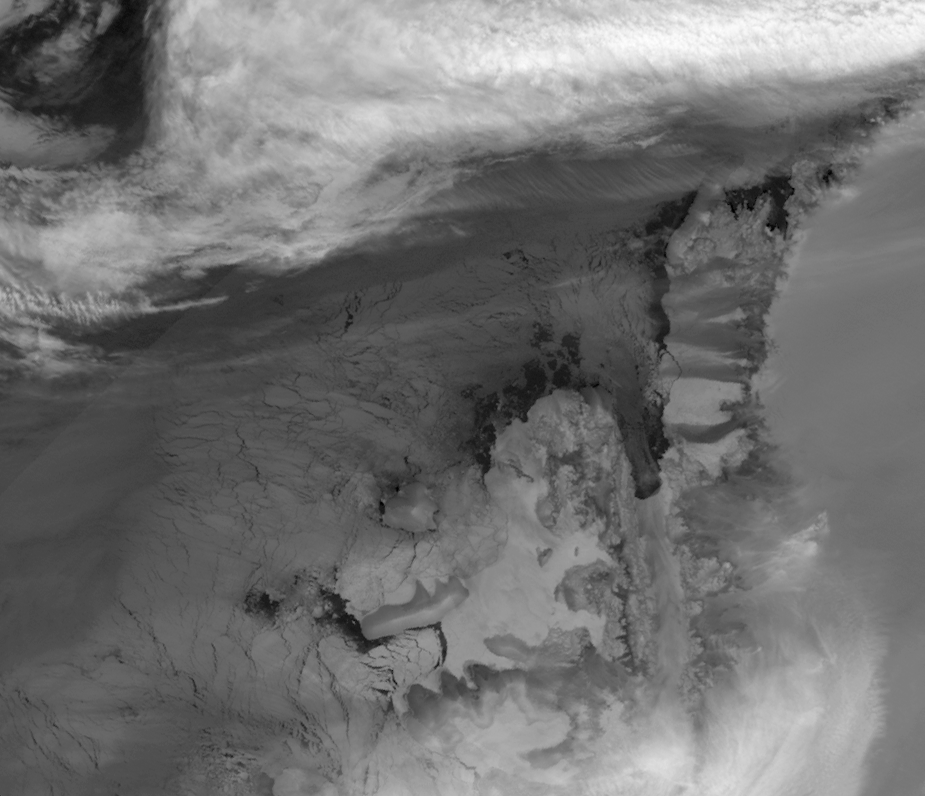
Thermal infra-red satellite image of Charcot Island

The Marion Nunataks are a small group of nunataks rising to about 600 m (2,000 ft) on Charcot Island, in the eastern Bellinghausen Sea of Antarctica. They form a 12 km chain of rocky outcrops on the mid-north coast of the island, stretching from Mount Monique at the western end to Mount Martine in the east.

== History ==
They were discovered and roughly mapped on 11 January 1910 by the Fourth French Antarctic Expedition under Jean-Baptiste Charcot, and named by him in association with Mount Monique and Mount Martine after his daughter, Marion. They were photographed from the air on 9 February 1947 in the course of the US Navy's Operation Highjump and mapped from these photographs by D. Searle of the Falkland Islands Dependencies Survey in 1960.

== Antarctic Specially Protected Area ==
Some 176 km^{2} of land encompassing the nunataks is protected as Antarctic Specially Protected Area (ASPA) No.170 for its biological values. It includes two species of lichen that have not been recorded elsewhere in Antarctica, mosses rarely found so far south, as well as a complete lack of predatory arthropods and Collembola. It was the first ASPA site to protect a substantial representative area of the permanent ice cap and nunataks of the southern Antarctic Peninsula.
