= Mirnyy Peak =

Peak in the north of Rothschild Island, Antarctica

Mirnyy Peak (69°20′S 72°34′W) is a prominent peak, 750 metres (2,460 ft) high, 4 nautical miles (7 km) northeast of Enigma Peak in the northern part of Rothschild Island in Antarctica. It was presumably first seen from a distance in 1821 by the First Russian Antarctic Expedition, led by Fabian von Bellingshausen and Mikhail Lazarev. The peak was photographed from the air by the United States Antarctic Service, 1939–41, and roughly mapped. It was mapped in detail from air photos taken by the Ronne Antarctic Research Expedition in 1947–48, by D. Searle of the Falkland Islands Dependencies Survey in 1960. The peak was named by the UK Antarctic Place-Names Committee for the sloop Mirnyy commanded by Lazarev, one of the ships of the Russian expedition.
