= Goward Peak =

Mountain in Antarctica

Goward Peak (69°36′S 72°19′W) is a sharp-pointed peak rising to about 500 metres (1,600 ft) just east of Fournier Ridge, Desko Mountains, on Rothschild Island, Antarctica. It was named by the Advisory Committee on Antarctic Names for Commander Richard F. Goward, Executive Officer on USCGC Glacier (WAGB-4) during Operation Deep Freeze in 1969.
