= Desko Mountains =

Group of mountains in Palmer Land, Antarctica

The Desko Mountains are a west-northwest–east-southeast mountain range on Rothschild Island, off northwest Alexander Island in Antarctica. The mountain range spans 20 miles (32 km) from Bates Peak to Overton Peak and rises to about 1,000 metres (3,300 ft) at Enigma Peak, Fournier Ridge.

== Geographical context ==
Other mountains nearby are Goward Peak, Schenck Peak, Morrill Peak and Thuma Peak.

To the east lies Lazarev Bay, a rectangular bay that separates the east side of Rothschild Island from the north-west coast of Alexander Island.

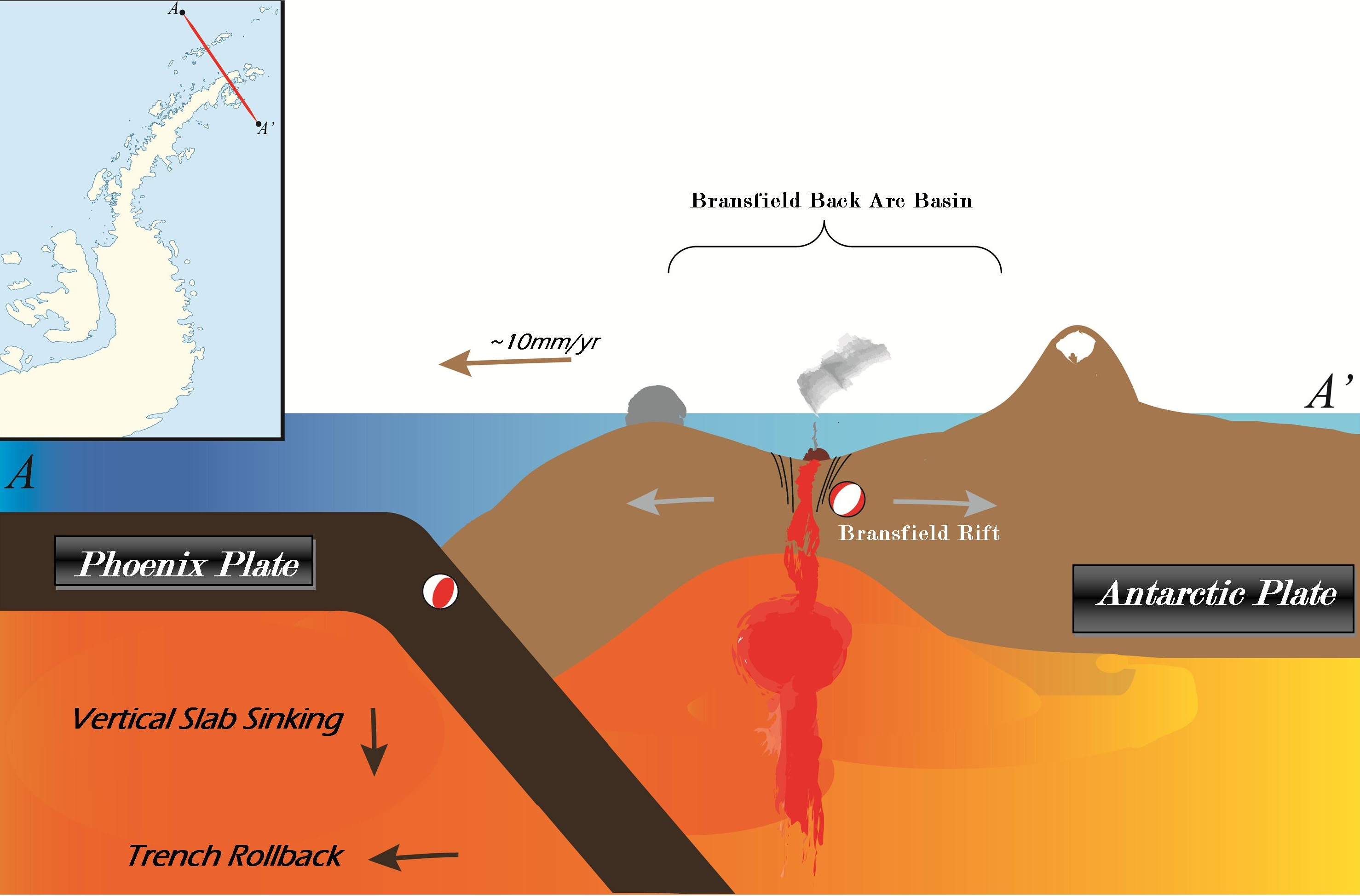
Antarctic Peninsula's tectonic movement

== Exploration ==
The mountains were seen (in part) from a distance by F. Bellingshausen in 1821, and by Jean-Baptiste Charcot in 1909, but the nature of the feature remained obscure.

The Desko mountain range was photographed from the air by U.S. Navy Operation Highjump and the Ronne Antarctic Research Expedition in 1947. The mountain range was further mapped by air by D. Searle of the Falkland Islands Dependencies Survey in 1960. The mountain range was further mapped by the U.S. Navy in 1966, and with Landsat imagery since 1975.

The island was named by the Advisory Committee on Antarctic Names for Commander Daniel A. Desko, U.S. Navy, Commanding Officer, Squadron VXE-6, Operation Deep Freeze, 1977, and LC-130 aircraft commander, 1976.

== See also ==
- Larsen Ice Shelf
- Composite Antarctic Gazetteer
- List of Antarctic and sub-Antarctic islands
- List of Antarctic islands south of 60° S
- SCAR
- Territorial claims in Antarctica
- List of Antarctic ice shelves
- Wilkins Sound
