= Cape Byrd =

Headland in Antarctica

Cape Byrd (69°38′S 76°7′W) is a low, ice-covered cape forming the northwest extremity of Charcot Island. It was first seen from the air and roughly mapped by Sir Hubert Wilkins on December 29, 1929, in a flight from the William Scoresby. It was named by Wilkins for R. Admiral Richard E. Byrd, U.S. Navy, noted American explorer and leader of five expeditions to Antarctica. It was remapped from air photos taken by U.S. Navy Operation Highjump in 1947 by Derek J.H. Searle of the Falkland Islands Dependencies Survey in 1960.
