= USS O-12 =

O-class submarine of the United States

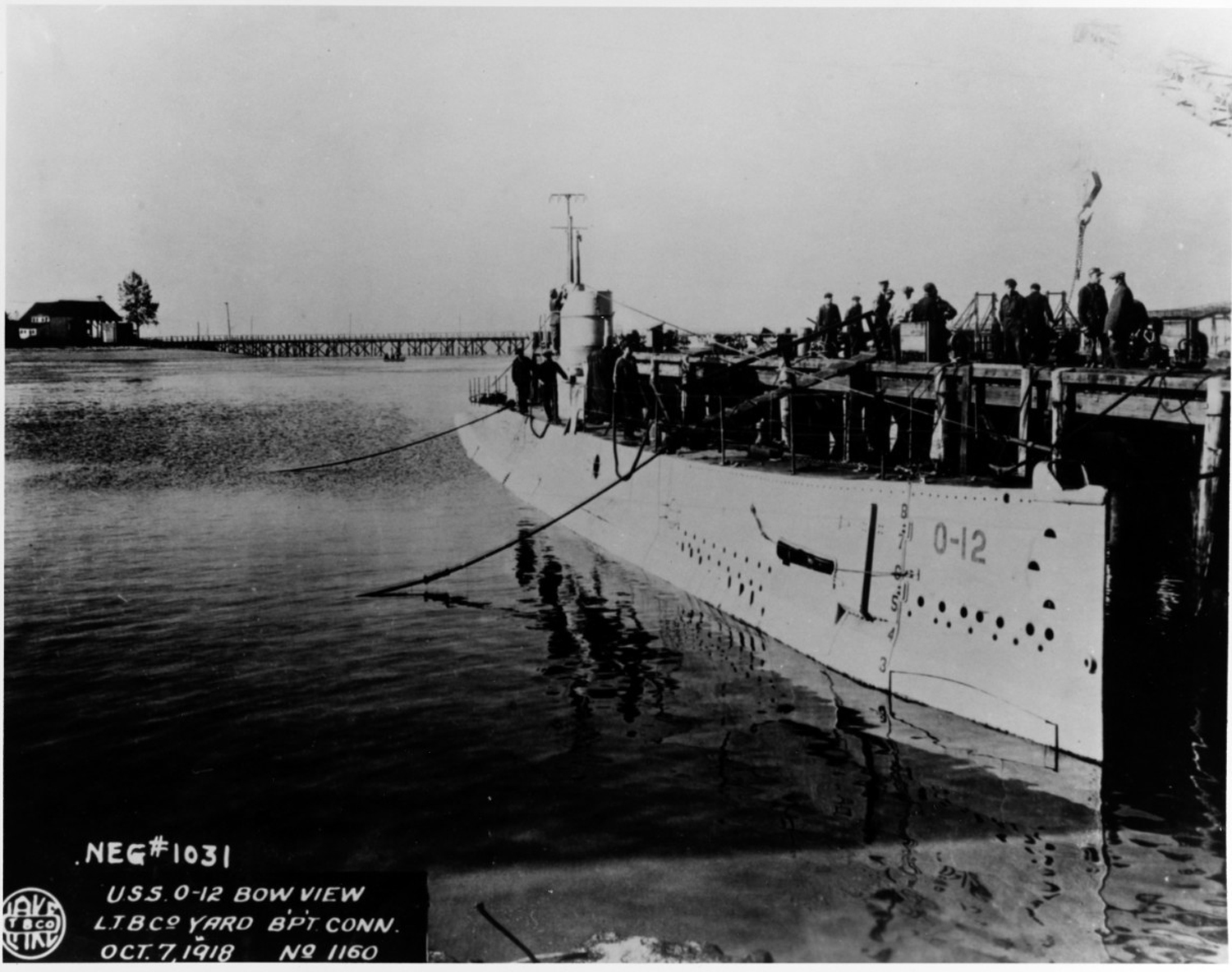
- USS O-12 at the Lake Torpedo Boat Company, Bridgeport, Connecticut, on 7 October 1918

History

United States
- Name: O-12
- Ordered: 3 March 1916
- Builder: Lake Torpedo Boat Company, Bridgeport, Connecticut
- Cost: $620,918.53 (hull and machinery)
- Laid down: 6 March 1916
- Launched: 29 September 1917
- Sponsored by: Mrs. Marguerite Cummings
- Commissioned: 19 October 1918
- Decommissioned: 17 June 1924
- Stricken: 29 May 1930
- Identification: Hull symbol: SS-73 (17 July 1920); Call sign: NETL
- Fate: Transferred to the USSB

United States
- Name: Nautilus
- Namesake: Nautilus
- In service: 24 March 1931
- Fate: Scuttled 20 November 1931

General characteristics
- Class & type: O-11-class submarine
- Displacement: 485 long tons (493 t) surfaced; 566 long tons (575 t) submerged
- Length: 175 ft (53 m)
- Beam: 16 ft 7 in (5.05 m)
- Draft: 13 ft 11 in (4.24 m)
- Installed power: 1,000 bhp (746 kW); 800 hp (597 kW)
- Propulsion: 2 × Busch-Sulzer diesel engines; 2 × Diehl Manufacture Company electric motors; 1 × 120-cell battery; 2 × shafts
- Speed: 14 kn surfaced; 11 kn (20 km/h; 13 mph) submerged
- Range: 5500 nmi at 11.5 kn surfaced; 250 nmi at 5 kn submerged
- Test depth: 200 ft
- Capacity: 18,588 US gal (70,360 L; 15,478 imp gal) fuel
- Complement: 2 officers; 27 enlisted
- Armament: 4 × 18 inch bow torpedo tubes (8 torpedoes); 1 × 3 in/23 caliber retractable deck gun

USS O-12 (SS-73), also known as "Submarine No. 73", was one of 16 O-class submarines of the United States Navy commissioned during World War I.

Laid up in reserve by the US Navy, in 1924, the submarine was leased for use in Arctic exploration in 1930, sponsored by William Randolph Hearst. Renamed Nautilus, the submarine suffered significant damage while exploring the Arctic, in 1931, and while having recorded significant data while there, Hearst considered the venture a failure. She returned to Norway, to repair the damage, and the submarine was returned to the U.S. Navy there, they had the submarine towed down a fjord and scuttled, in November 1931.

== Design ==
The later O-boats, O-11 through O-16, were designed by the Lake Torpedo Boat Company, to different specifications from the earlier boats designed by Electric Boat. They did not perform as well, and are sometimes considered a separate class. The submarines had a length of 175 ft (53.3 m) overall, a beam of 16 ft 7 in (5.1 m), and a mean draft of 13 ft 11 in (4.2 m). They displaced 485 long tons (493 t) on the surface and 566 long tons (575 t) submerged. The O-class submarines had a crew of two officers and 27 enlisted men. They had a diving depth of 200 ft (61 m).

For surface running, the boats were powered by two 500-brake-horsepower (373 kW) Busch-Sulzer diesel engines, each driving one propeller shaft. When submerged each propeller was driven by a 370-horsepower (276 kW) Diehl Manufacture Company electric motor. They could reach 14 knots (26 km/h; 16 mph) on the surface and 11 kn (20 km/h; 13 mph) underwater. On the surface, the O class had a range of 5,500 nautical miles (10,200 km; 6,300 mi) at 11.5 kn (21.3 km/h; 13.2 mph).

The boats were armed with four 18-inch (450 mm) torpedo tubes in the bow. They carried four reloads, for a total of eight torpedoes. The O-class submarines were also armed with a single 3 in (76 mm)/23 caliber retractable deck gun.

== Construction ==
O-12's keel was laid down on 6 March 1916, by the Lake Torpedo Boat Company, in Bridgeport, Connecticut. She was launched on 29 September 1917, sponsored by Mrs. Marguerite Cummings, wife of Homer S. Cummings, and commissioned on 18 October 1918.

== Service history ==
O-12 spent much of her career as a unit of Submarine Division 1, based at Coco Solo, in the Panama Canal Zone.

When the US Navy adopted its hull classification system on 17 July 1920, she received the hull number SS-73.

In 1921, she was awarded a Battle Efficiency Pennant and trophy for gunnery (gun and torpedo). She decommissioned on 17 June 1924, after just five and a half years of service, and was placed in reserve at the Philadelphia Naval Yard.

== Nautilus Arctic Expedition ==
Struck from the Naval Vessel Register on 29 July 1930, ex-O-12 transferred to the United States Shipping Board (USSB), for conversion by the Philadelphia Navy Yard. She was leased at the rate of one dollar per year to Lake and Danenhower, Inc., of Bridgeport, for use on Hubert Wilkins's and Lincoln Ellsworth's Arctic Expedition of geophysical investigation. The lease required that she either be returned to the Navy for disposal, or scuttled in at least 1,200 ft (370 m) of water.

On 24 March 1931, she was re-christened Nautilus. As Prohibition prevented the use of an alcoholic beverage, she was baptised not with the traditional champagne but rather with a bucket of ice cubes. Great French writer Jules Verne's grandson was present at the event, under the French flag, along with Sir Hubert's new-wed wife, actress Suzanne Bennett.

Simon Lake furnished Nautilus with several pieces of scientific equipment designed for under-ice operations. One was a mechanical probe, much like a trolley pole, that would scrape along the bottom of the ice cap to indicate how much clearance the submarine had below the ice. Another included drills, supposedly capable of cutting through 13 ft (4 m) of ice, to reach fresh air. The vessel's torpedo chamber was converted into a moon pool, when its water-tight door was closed, pressure was equalized, so a trap door could be opened, allowing the lowering of scientific instruments. These innovations were tested only cursorily before the boat put to sea.

Nautilus, with her crew of 20 men, was commanded by Captain Sloan Danenhower, son of John Wilson Danenhower, who served aboard USS Jeannette during her Arctic expedition. On 4 June 1931, Nautilus began the crossing from New York City, United States, to Plymouth, England. The first leg of the voyage that was planned to take them up the coast of the North Sea, to Spitsbergen, and conclude with a dramatic rendezvous at the North Pole with the German airship Graf Zeppelin. On that first leg, however, Nautilus encountered a violent storm. Both engines failed, leaving the boat adrift. She was rescued, and initially towed into Cork Harbor, in Southern Ireland, on 22 June, where her batteries were re-charged, before being towed to England, by USS Wyoming, where she was repaired.

On 5 August 1931, very late in the year to begin an Arctic expedition, Nautilus began making her way through the English Channel, and along the Norwegian coast. Another storm again damaged the boat, carrying away her bridge and giving her a permanent list, but after a stop in Tromsø, on 11 August, she successfully reached Spitsbergen, where Wilkins allowed only a single day for repairs.

The crew carried out the planned scientific experiments as they pushed on northward, but thick pack ice hindered their progress. The boat was ill-equipped to deal with the extreme cold, lacking insulation and heaters. The fresh water system froze and the hull developed slow leaks.

After ten days, Nautilus reached the 82nd parallel north, the farthest north any vessel had reached under its own power, and preparations began to dive and proceed under the ice. However, the boat refused to respond; the stern planes had been carried away at some unknown earlier time. Without them, the submarine could not control its depth while submerged, and the expedition had to be aborted.

On 31 August, under financial pressure from newspaperman William Randolph Hearst, who had initially promised to pay for the expedition, but who indicated by telegraph that Wilkins would not be paid if he did not continue, Wilkins ordered the submarine onward. Captain Danenhower ordered Nautilus trimmed down by the bow, and deliberately rammed an ice floe in an attempt to force the boat under. The manoeuver worked, in that Nautilus submerged, and became the first submarine to operate under the polar ice cap. However, her unconventional method of diving caused significant damage to her upper works. She was out of radio contact for days, was presumed lost, and rescue efforts were planned. In fact, she had actually travelled only a short distance under the ice before resurfacing through a polynya, but her radios had been badly damaged, requiring days to repair.

The scientific crew continued their experiments, and their findings became the first paper published by the Woods Hole Oceanographic Institution. On 20 September, Nautilus returned to Spitsbergen, carrying invaluable data and with all crew alive. Hearst, however, considered the expedition a failure and carried out his threat, refusing to pay for the expedition.

== Fate ==
Following the expedition, O-12 was returned to the Navy Department. On 20 November 1931, she was towed three miles (4.8 km) down the Byfjorden, a Norwegian fjord just outside Bergen, and scuttled in 1,138 feet (347 m) of water. In 1981, Norwegian divers found her wreck.

In 1959, USS Skate was the first submarine to surface at the North Pole, and the second submarine, after USS Nautilus (SSN-571) in 1958, to reach the North Pole. Her crew conducted a tribute to Sir George Hubert Wilkins, and scattered his ashes over the North Pole.

In 2010, the research submersible JAGO dove to try to locate and inspect Nautilus.

== Bibliography ==
- "Table 21 - Ships on Navy List June 30, 1919". Congressional Serial Set. U.S. Government Printing Office: 769. 1921.
- Gary, Priolo. "O-12 (SS-73)". Navsource.net.
- Friedman, Norman (1995). U.S. Submarines Through 1945: An Illustrated Design History. Annapolis, Maryland: Naval Institute Press. ISBN 1-55750-263-3.
- Gardiner, Robert & Gray, Randal (1985). Conway's All the World's Fighting Ships 1906–1921. Annapolis, Maryland: Naval Institute Press. ISBN 0-85177-245-5.
- "O-12". Dictionary of American Naval Fighting Ships. Navy Department, Naval History and Heritage Command. 17 August 2015. This article incorporates text from this source, which is in the public domain.
- Hall, Anne Martin (1925). Ships of the United States navy and their sponsors, 1913-1923.
- Fricke, Hans; Fricke, Sebastian (2011). "Frozen North – Sir Hubert's Forgotten Submarine Expedition". Fricke Productions. Archived from the original on 27 June 2019.
- "Polar Sub Can Drill Through Ice". Popular Science. April 1931.
- McLaren, Alfred S. CAPT USN (July 1981). Under the Ice in Submarines. United States Naval Institute Proceedings.
- "Nautilus Given "Lift" at Midsea" (PDF). The Washington Times. 7 July 1931.
