= Mount Monique =

Mountain in Antarctica

Mount Monique is a mountain, about 600 m high, with a prominent rocky north face and ice-covered south slopes, at the western end of the Marion Nunataks on the north coast of Charcot Island in the east Bellinghausen Sea of Antarctica.

== History ==
It was discovered and roughly mapped on 11 January 1910, by the French Antarctic Expedition under Jean-Baptiste Charcot, and named by him in association with Marion Nunataks and Mount Martine after his daughter, Monique. It was photographed from the air on 9 February 1947 in the course of the US Navy's Operation Highjump and mapped from these photographs by Derek J.H. Searle of the Falkland Islands Dependencies Survey (FIDS) in 1960. The mountain forms part of the Marion Nunataks Antarctic Specially Protected Area (ASPA No.170) designated as such for its biological values.
