= Bates Peak =

Mountain in Antarctica

Coordinates: 69°35′S 72°48′W

Bates Peak, about 600 metres (2,000 ft) high, is the westernmost peak on Rothschild Island, rising west of Fournier Ridge in the Desko Mountains. It was named by the Advisory Committee on Antarctic Names for Commander Lawrence O. Bates, U.S. Coast Guard, Executive Officer on USCGC Edisto during U.S. Navy Operation Deep Freeze, 1969.
