= Schenck Peak =

Mountain in Antarctica

Schenck Peak (69°40′S 72°18′W) is a peak (about 500 m) in Desko Mountains, located 2 nautical miles (3.7 km) southwest of Morrill Peak in southeast Rothschild Island. Named by Advisory Committee on Antarctic Names (US-ACAN) for Commander James N. Schenck, USCG, Executive Officer of USCGC Staten Island during U.S. Navy Operation Deepfreeze, 1971.
