= Robert Scarborough =

Robert Scarborough may refer to:

- Robert B. Scarborough (1861–1927), U.S. Representative from South Carolina
- Robert H. Scarborough (1923–2020), U.S. Coast Guard admiral
