= Mount Martine =

Mountain in Palmer Land, Antarctica

Coordinates: 69°45′S 75°5′W

Mount Martine is a massive mountain, about 800 metres (2,600 ft) high, with a prominent rocky north face and ice-covered south slopes, overlooking the north shore of Charcot Island, south of Cheesman Island, in the east Bellinghausen Sea of Antarctica.

== History ==
It was discovered and roughly mapped on 11 January 1910, by the Fourth French Antarctic Expedition under Jean-Baptiste Charcot, and named by him in association with Mount Monique and the Marion Nunataks after his daughter, Martine. It was photographed from the air on 9 February 1947 in the course of the US Navy's Operation Highjump and mapped from these photographs by D. Searle of the Falkland Islands Dependencies Survey in 1960. The mountain forms part of the Marion Nunataks Antarctic Specially Protected Area (ASPA No.170) designated as such for its biological values.
