= Thuma Peak =

Peak in the Desko Mountains in Antarctica

Coordinates: 69°40′S 72°3′W

Thuma Peak is a mainly ice-free peak in the Desko Mountains, rising 2 miles (3 km) northwest of Overton Peak in southeast Rothschild Island in Antarctica. It was named by the Advisory Committee on Antarctic Names for Captain Jack S. Thuma, U.S. Coast Guard.
