= Latady Island =

Island in Antarctica

- Location of Latady Island

- Location within Antarctic Peninsula

Geography
- Location: Antarctica
- Coordinates: 70°45′S 74°35′W
- Length: 64.82 km (40.277 mi)
- Width: 18.52 km (11.508 mi)

Administration
- Administered under the Antarctic Treaty System

Demographics
- Population: Uninhabited

Latady Island is a low ice-covered island off the coast of Antarctica, about 35 nmi (65 km) long and 10 nmi (20 km) wide, lying 45 nmi (85 km) south of Charcot Island and west of Alexander Island. An ice-covered feature in this approximate position was seen from the air and described by Sir Hubert Wilkins in 1929, but not recognized as an island or separately mapped. Latady Island was first photographed from the air by the Ronne Antarctic Research Expedition (RARE), 1947–1948, and mapped from these photos by D. Searle of the Falkland Islands Dependencies Survey in 1960. it was named by the UK Antarctic Place-Names Committee for William R. Latady, an aerial photographer and navigator on the RARE flight.

== See also ==
- Composite Antarctic Gazetteer
- List of Antarctic islands south of 60° S
- Scientific Committee on Antarctic Research
- Territorial claims in Antarctica
