= Benedict L. Stabile =

United States Coast Guard vice admiral (1927–2014)

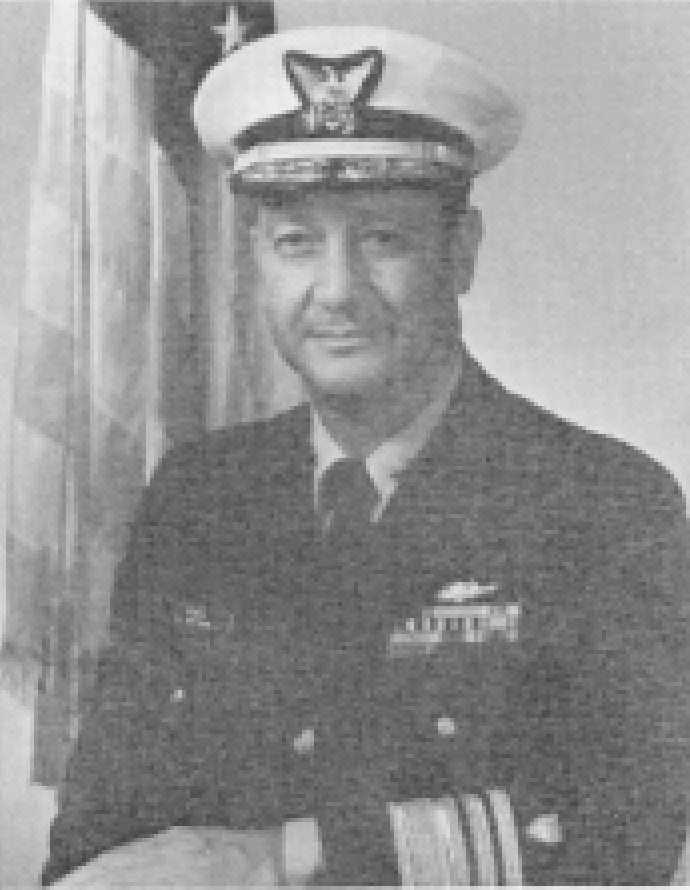
- Born: December 13, 1927; Brooklyn, New York, U.S.
- Died: July 28, 2014 (aged 86); Willow Street, Pennsylvania, U.S.
- Burial place: Arlington National Cemetery
- Military career
- Allegiance: United States
- Branch: United States Coast Guard
- Service years: 1950–1986
- Rank: Vice admiral
- Commands: Vice Commandant of the United States Coast Guard

Benedict Louis Stabile (December 13, 1927 – July 28, 2014) was a vice admiral in the United States Coast Guard who served as Vice Commandant from 1982 to 1986. He was married to Barbara Adele Thompson and has four children. He was born in Brooklyn, New York and graduated from the United States Coast Guard Academy in 1950. He later also attended Massachusetts Institute of Technology, attaining a degree in Naval Engineering. Stabile also served at one point as Chief of Coast Guard Engineering. Upon his retirement from the Coast Guard in 1986, he served as the president of the Webb Institute until 1990. On July 28, 2014, Stabile died at the age of 86.

Military offices
Preceded by Robert H. Scarborough	Vice Commandant of the United States Coast Guard; 1972–1986	Succeeded by James C. Irwin
