= Rothschild Island =

Island in Antarctica

- Location within Antarctica

Geography
- Location: Antarctica
- Coordinates: 69°36′S 72°33′W
- Area: 700 km^{2} (270 sq mi) (approximately)
- Length: 39 km (24.2 mi)

Administration
- Administered under the Antarctic Treaty System

Demographics
- Population: Uninhabited

Rothschild Island is a black, rugged island 39 kilometres (24 mi) long, mainly ice-covered but surmounted by prominent peaks of the Desko Mountains in Antarctica, 8 kilometres (5 mi) west of the north part of Alexander Island in the north entrance to Wilkins Sound.

== Geography and wildlife ==
Lazarev Bay separates Rothschild Island from Alexander Island. There is a mountain range on Rothschild Island, the Desko Mountains, which spans 20 miles (32 km) from Bates Peak to Overton Peak and rises to about 1,000 metres (3,300 ft) at Enigma Peak, Fournier Ridge. It also contains Goward Peak, Mirnyy Peak, Morrill Peak, Schenck Peak and Thuma Peak.

There are three small outcrops of volcanic rock on the island, with an exposed thickness of around a hundred meters.

An emperor penguin colony is located in a bay between Alexander Island and Rothschild Island, averaging around 700 breeding pairs, a small number. There are four other emperor penguin colonies in the central and eastern portion of the Bellingshausen Sea; all five were discovered via satellite imagery in the 14 years prior to 2023. As of 2023, the Rothschild Island colony was the only one to have been visited by scientists in 2015–2016. It was also the only colony of the five not to have suffered total breeding failure in 2022 as a result of ice loss. On 20 November 2022, helicopters from the ship Le Commandant Charcot counted 820 chicks and 228 adults at this location.

== History ==
A survey work from 1975-6 showing Rothschild Island

The island was first sighted in 1825 by Fabian Gottlieb von Bellingshausen, who described three peaks. It was also seen by the French Antarctic Expedition (1908–1910), and named Rothschild Island ("Île E. de Rothschild") by Jean-Baptiste Charcot, in honour of Édouard Alphonse James de Rothschild (1868–1949), head of the Rothschild banking family of France and president of de Rothschild Frères.

In the subsequent explorations of the area by the British Graham Land Expedition (c. 1934–1937), the feature was believed to be a mountain connected to Alexander Island. Geologically, this might be true, but it has not been proven by any means due to a lack of anything like a complete geological survey of the region.

However, Rothschild Island's insularity was reaffirmed in November 1940 by the United States Antarctic Service Expedition, which photographed and roughly mapped the island from the air and discovered a strait.

Rothschild Island was mapped in detail from air photos taken by the Ronne Antarctic Research Expedition (1946–1948) and by Searle of the Falkland Islands Dependencies Survey in 1960, and from US government satellite imagery taken in 1974.

In January 1976, a British Antarctic Survey team consisting of surveyor Richard Barrett and general assistant Mike Chantry became the first to visit Rothschild Island. During five weeks in 1976–1977, B. W. Care, together with a general assistant, mapped the geology of the island. In 1985, researcher Malcolm Hole became the second to visit the island; a part of it, the Hole peninsula, was named in his honour in 2021.

== Threats and preservation ==
Although this extremely remote region has never had a permanent population and is protected under the Antarctic Treaty System which prohibits industrial development and nuclear testing its fragile ecosystem is nevertheless threatened by growing tourism. This tourism primarily takes place via cruises from the Argentine port of Ushuaia into the Southern Ocean.

== See also ==
- Larsen Ice Shelf
- Composite Antarctic Gazetteer
- List of Antarctic and sub-Antarctic islands
- List of Antarctic islands south of 60° S
- SCAR
- Territorial claims in Antarctica
- List of Antarctic ice shelves
- Wilkins Sound
