= Kurt Weyher =

German admiral (1901–1991)

- Born: 30 August 1901
- Died: 17 December 1991 (aged 90)
- Military career
- Allegiance: Nazi Germany
- Branch: Kriegsmarine
- Service years: 1918–45
- Rank: Konteradmiral
- Commands: Training ship Horst Wessel; Auxiliary cruiser Orion
- Conflicts: World War I World War II
- Awards: Knight's Cross of the Iron Cross; Great Cross of Merit

Kurt August Viktor Weyher (30 August 1901 – 17 December 1991) was a German rear admiral of the navy (Kriegsmarine) of Nazi Germany. During World War II, he commanded a merchant raider.

Although it was not mentioned in his book "The Black Raider", it seems that Weyher was a non-trivial painter; in a feature article author Keith Gordon tells that on the voyage of the Orion Weyher did about 30 paintings on subjects connected with the ship's activities. The one painting illustrated seems to have had narrative merit and to have represented the topographic background recognisably.

== Awards ==
- Silesian Eagle 2nd and 1st Grade
- Iron Cross (1939) 2nd Class (9 July 1940) & 1st Class (30 August 1940)
- Kriegsabzeichen für Hilfskreuzer (23 August 1941)
- Knight's Cross of the Iron Cross on 21 August 1941 as Fregattenkapitän and commander of auxiliary cruiser Orion (HSK-1)
- German Cross in Gold on 18 May 1944 as Kapitän zur See and chief of the Deutsches Marinekommando Konstanza (German naval command Constanța)
- Cross of Merit on ribbon (29 April 1977)
