= Suzanne Bennett =

Australian actress (1893–1974)

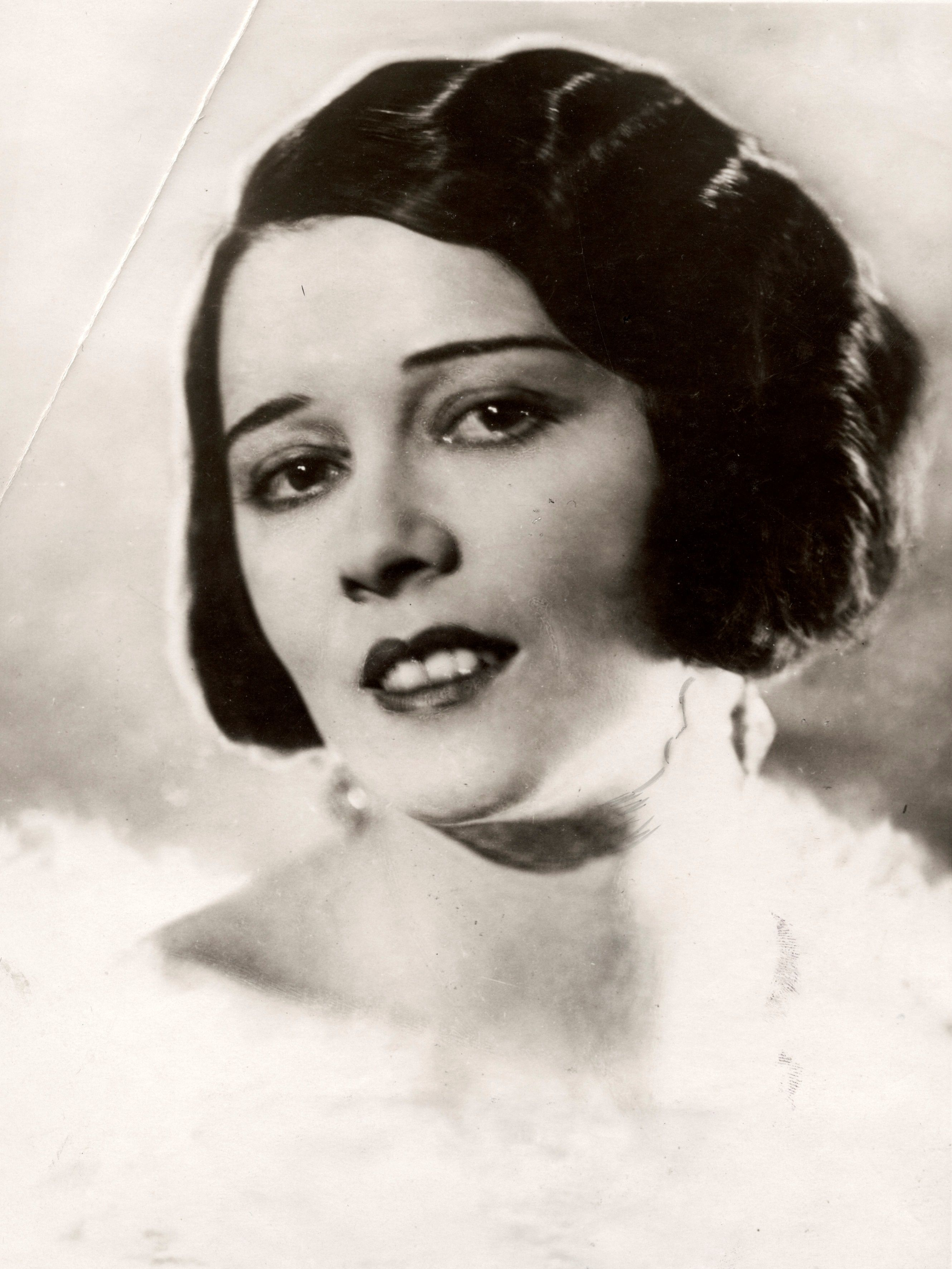
- Born: Suzanne Evans; 1893; Walhalla, Victoria, Australia
- Died: December 1974 (aged 80–81); Orange County, California
- Resting place: North Pole
- Other names: Lady Hubert Wilkins
- Occupation: Stage actress
- Spouse: Hubert Wilkins

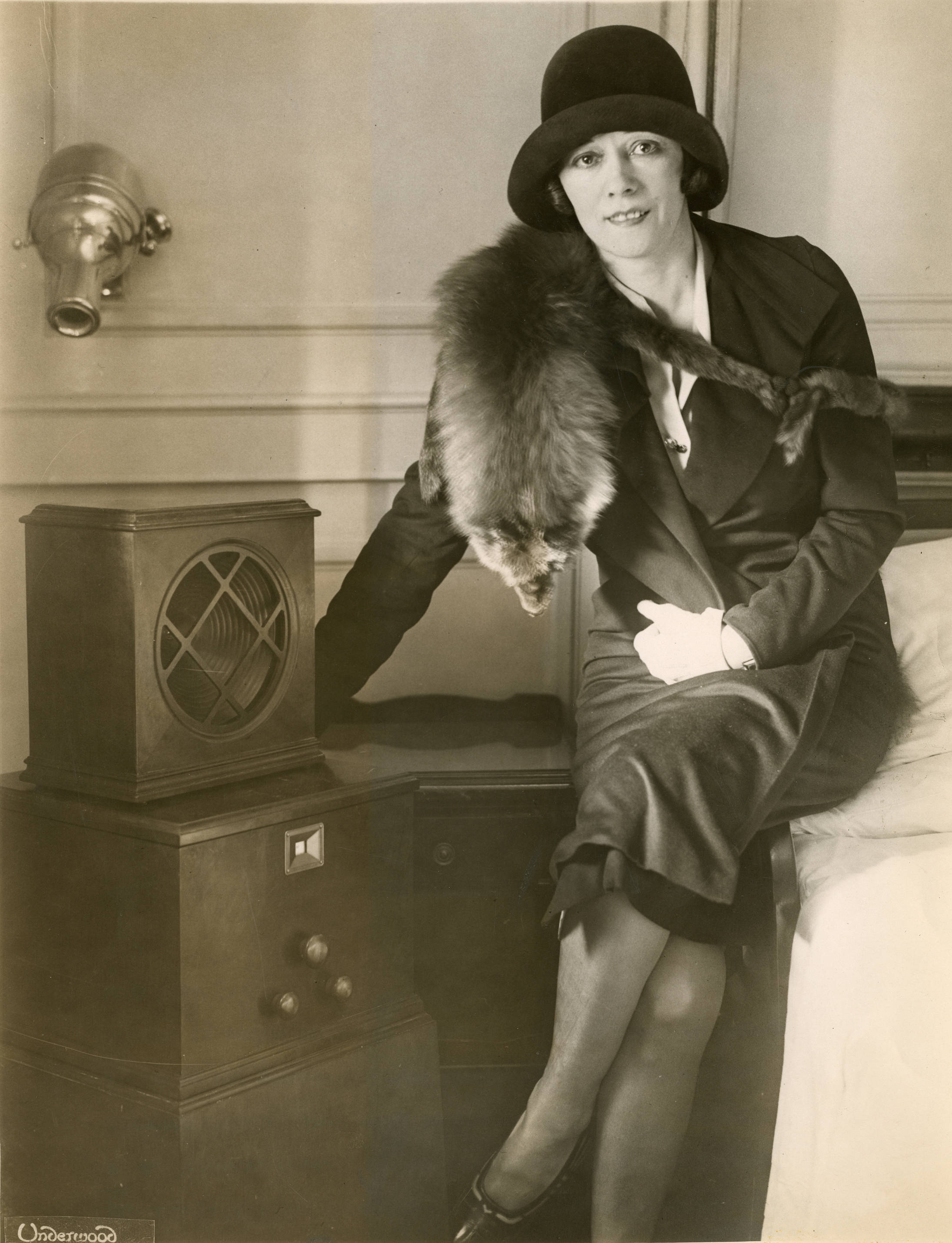
Bennett in 1928

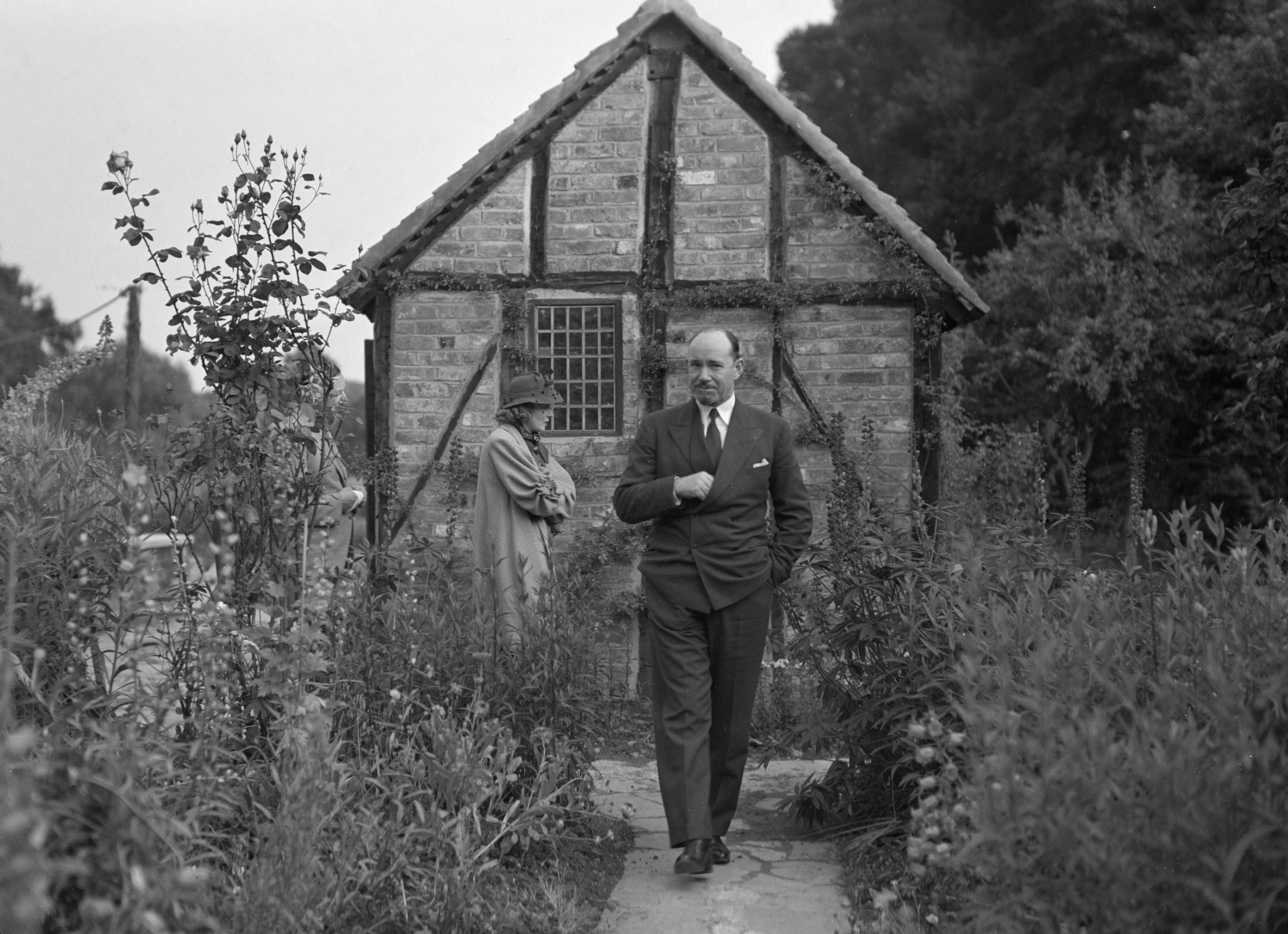
Sir Hubert Wilkins and his wife Suzanne Bennett (1932)

Suzanne Bennett (1893–1974) (also known as Lady Hubert Wilkins) was an Australian-born actress who achieved success on Broadway in the United States in the 1920s. She was born Susannah Catherine Evans in the goldfields town of Walhalla, Victoria to John Evans (a miner) and Alice Louisa Whitlow. She had four siblings (sisters Mabel and Edith; and brothers John and Arthur).

She took the name Bennett from her 1915 marriage to 20-year-old soldier, Private Oscar Bennett. At the time of their marriage, she was living in St. Kilda, Victoria. Oscar Bennett survived the war, returning to Australia in 1919. At this time, Suzanne Bennett had worked on stage in Australia, first in the chorus of the Rigo Grand Opera Company, and later with Hugh D. McIntosh's productions. However, her marriage to Bennett was an unhappy one and a divorce was finally granted in early 1922. By 1923, Suzanne was in New York looking for work. Within a year, she was performing in Broadway productions.

Bennett met the celebrated explorer Sir George Hubert Wilkins on 20 June 1928 in New York City during a reception honoring Wilkins after his famed flight over the Arctic Sea. The couple were sufficiently famous to warrant a marriage announcement in the 9 September 1929 issue of Time magazine. There it was reported that the couple had wed in Cleveland, Ohio. That notice also credits Bennett with having appeared on stage in Vanities and The Cyclone Lover.

After her marriage to Wilkins she was known as Lady Hubert Wilkins, living with Sir Hubert in New York City. In her later years, she and Sir Hubert spent their summers living on a 100-acre (40 ha) rural converted farm in the Endless Mountains area of Rush Township, Susquehanna County, Pennsylvania, a property she and Sir Hubert purchased in the 1950s. Lady Wilkins was a gifted portrait artist, and did many paintings during her lifetime. She suffered a stroke in 1972, which left her blind. She was cared for by Winston Ross – Sir Hubert's former personal secretary – and his wife Marley Ross, relocating to Southern California. She died in Orange County, California in December 1974, and her ashes were scattered at the North Pole from the US Navy submarine USS Bluefish on 4 May 1975, as were her husband's from USS Skate in 1959.

The couple had no children during their twenty-nine years of marriage.

== Broadway performances ==
Guns [Original, Play]
Performer: Suzanne Bennett [Cora Chase] -Dates: Aug 6, 1928 – Sep 1928

The Cyclone Lover [Original, Play, Comedy]
Performer: Suzanne Bennett [Katherine] -Dates: Jun 5, 1928 – Jul 1928

What Do We Know? [Original, Play]
Performer: Suzanne Bennett [Ernestine Fox] -Dates: Dec 23, 1927 – Jan 1928

Merry-Go-Round [Original, Musical, Comedy, Revue]
Performer: Suzanne Bennett -Dates: May 31, 1927 – Sep 24, 1927

Nic Nax of 1926 [Original, Musical, Revue]
Performer: Suzanne Bennett -Dates: Aug 2, 1926 – Aug 13, 1926

Port O' London [Original, Play]
Performer: Suzanne Bennett [May] Feb 9, 1926 – Mar 1926

Earl Carroll's Vanities [1925] [Original, Musical, Revue]
Performer: Suzanne Bennett [Ensemble] -Dates: Jul 6, 1925 – Dec 27, 1925

The Rat [Original, Play]
Performer: Suzanne Bennett [Mimi] -Dates: Feb 10, 1925 – May 1925

Innocent Eyes [Original, Musical, Revue]
Performer: Suzanne Bennett -Dates: May 20, 1924 – Aug 30, 1924
