= Morrill Peak =

Mountain in Palmer Land, Antarctica

Coordinates: 69°39′S 72°18′W

Morrill Peak is a sharp-pointed peak, about 550 metres (1,800 ft) high, in the Desko Mountains, rising 2 nautical miles (4 km) west-northwest of Thuma Peak in southeast Rothschild Island, Antarctica. It was named by the Advisory Committee on Antarctic Names for Captain Peter A. Morrill, U.S. Coast Guard, Executive Officer on USCGC Westwind in U.S. Navy Operation Deep Freeze in 1967 and 1968.
