= Robert H. Scarborough =

United States Coast Guard admiral (1923–2020)

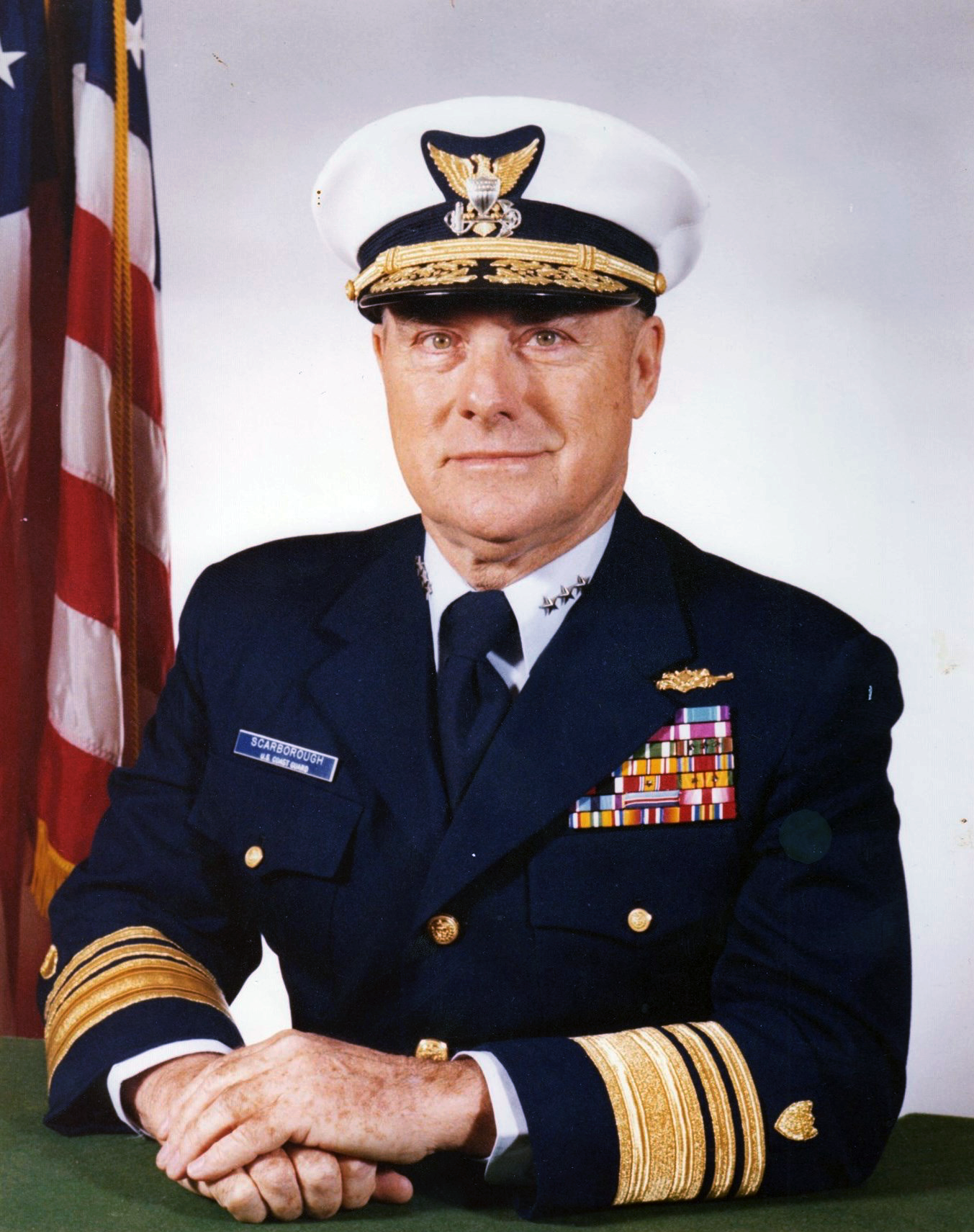
- Born: Robert Henry Scarborough Jr. March 12, 1923; Hawkinsville, Georgia, U.S.
- Died: March 20, 2020 (aged 97); Bethesda, Maryland, U.S.
- Military career
- Allegiance: United States
- Branch: United States Navy; United States Coast Guard
- Service years: 1943–1982
- Rank: Vice admiral
- Commands: Vice Commandant of the United States Coast Guard

Robert Henry Scarborough Jr. (March 12, 1923 – March 20, 2020) was a vice admiral in the United States Coast Guard who served as the 13th Vice Commandant from 1978 to 1982.

== Biography ==
He was born in Hawkinsville, Georgia. A 1944 graduate of the United States Merchant Marine Academy, Vice Admiral Scarborough entered the Coast Guard in 1949 following service as an officer in the Navy and Merchant Marine.

Prior to his service in the U.S. Coast Guard, he was appointed as a cadet midshipman in the United States Merchant Marine Cadet Corps during World War II, after attending United States Merchant Marine Academy (Kings Point) in 1942. He served in various theaters of war on board the SS Black Hawk, M/V Brandywine, and the U.S. Army Hospital Ship Seminole, including participation in the Sicilian invasion while still a cadet.

He maintained a license as Master of ocean steam and motor vessels of unlimited tonnage. Serving in various geographical areas both ashore and afloat, his numerous earlier Coast Guard assignments were in the fields of general operations, personnel, and public information including both command afloat and command ashore as Group Commander and Captain of the Port. Previous assignments as a flag officer have been as Commander, Ninth Coast Guard District; Chief, Office of Operations; and Chief of Staff of the U.S. Coast Guard.

His military awards include the Legion of Merit with gold star, Meritorious Service Medal, Coast Guard Commendation Medal, all World War II theater medals, and the Coast Guard Distinguished Service Medal in August 1980.

He is survived by his wife, Walterene Brant Scarborough and his two sons, Robert Henry Scarborough III and James Burton Scarborough. He died at Walter Reed National Military Medical Center in Bethesda, Maryland. on March 20, 2020, from esophageal cancer.

== Dates of rank ==
Ensign	Lieutenant, Junior Grade	Lieutenant	Lieutenant Commander	Commander	Captain
O-1	O-2	O-3	O-4	O-5	O-6
Never held	November 30, 1949	August 26, 1952	July 1, 1959	July 1, 1964	July 1, 1969

Commodore	Rear Admiral	Vice Admiral
O-7	O-8	O-9
Never held	June 1, 1974	July 1, 1978

Military offices
Preceded by Ellis L. Perry	Vice Commandant of the United States Coast Guard; 1978–1982	Succeeded by Benedict L. Stabile
