= Overton Peak =

Mountain in Antarctica

Coordinates: 69°41′S 71°58′W

Overton Peak is a peak in the Desko Mountains, rising to about 550 metres (1,800 ft) at the southeast end of Rothschild Island. It was named by the Advisory Committee on Antarctic Names after Commander Robert H. Overton, U.S. Coast Guard, Executive Officer, USCGC Westwind, U.S. Navy Operation Deep Freeze, 1971.
