= Enigma Peak =

Peak in Antarctica

Coordinates: 69°34′S 72°44′W

Highest point
- Elevation: 1,500 m (4,900 ft)
- Prominence: 1,500 m (4,900 ft)
- Listing: Ultra, Ribu

Enigma Peak is a peak, 1,500 metres (4,900 ft) high, surmounting Fournier Ridge in the Desko Mountains, on Rothschild Island in Antarctica. It was probably seen from a distance by F. Bellingshausen in 1821, Jean-Baptiste Charcot in 1909, and the British Graham Land Expedition in 1936. It was observed and photographed from the air by the U.S. Antarctic Service, 1939–41, and was mapped as the prominent northwestern peak of the island. It was mapped in greater detail from air photos taken by the Ronne Antarctic Research Expedition, 1947–48, by D. Searle of the Falkland Islands Dependencies Survey in 1960, and from U.S. Landsat imagery of February 1975. It was so named by the UK Antarctic Place-Names Committee because of difficulty in identifying the peak during the map compilation.
