= Fournier Ridge =

Fournier Ridge (69°34′S 72°35′W) is an east–west ridge, 9 nautical miles (17 km) long, rising to about 1,000 metres (3,300 ft) in the western part of the Desko Mountains, on Rothschild Island in Antarctica. It was named by the Advisory Committee on Antarctic Names for Commander James M. Fournier, United States Coast Guard, commanding officer, USCGC Burton Island, Operation Deep Freeze, 1976 and 1977, and executive officer on the same ship in 1971.
