= Charcot Island =

Island in Antarctica

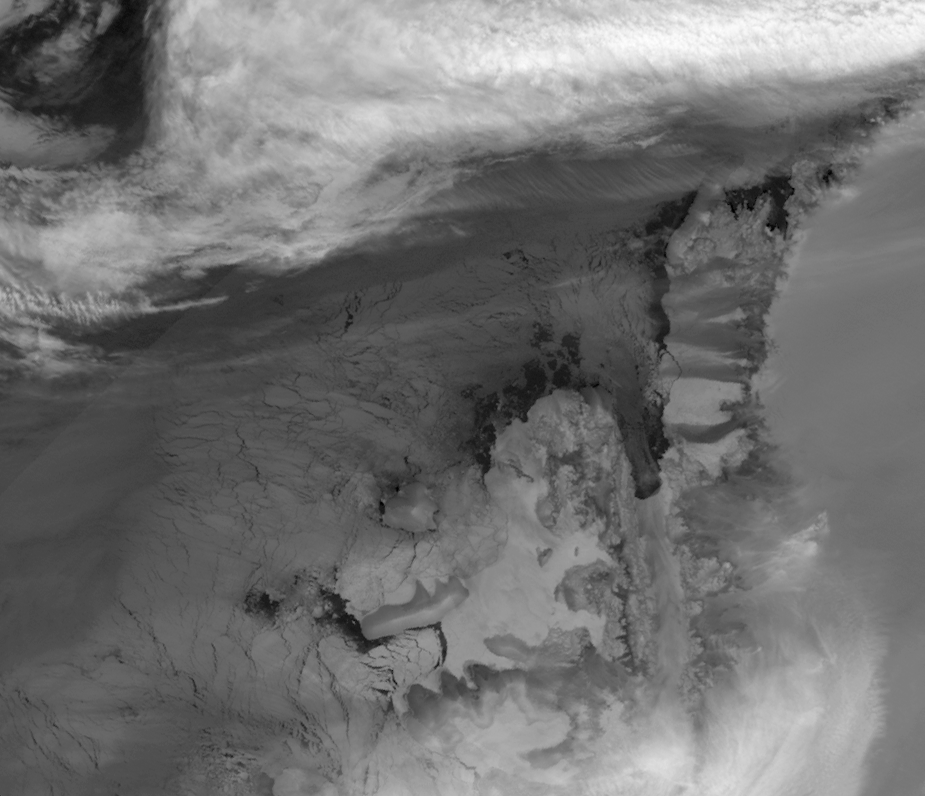
- Greyscale image of the Charcot Island area. Dark grey indicates relatively warm temperatures and white indicates relatively cold temperatures.

- Location of Charcot Island

- Charcot Island, shown to the west of the Antarctic Peninsula

Geography
- Location: Antarctica
- Coordinates: 69°45′S 75°15′W
- Area: 2,576 km^{2} (995 sq mi)
- Length: 56 km (34.8 mi)
- Width: 46 km (28.6 mi)

Administration
- Administered under the Antarctic Treaty System

Demographics
- Population: Uninhabited

Charcot Island or Charcot Land is an island administered under the Antarctic Treaty System, 56 kilometres (30 nmi) long and 46 kilometres (25 nmi) wide, which is ice covered except for prominent mountains overlooking the north coast. Charcot Island lies within the Bellingshausen Sea, 102 kilometres (55 nmi) west of Alexander Island, and about 57 kilometres (31 nmi) north of Latady Island. A notable landmark of the island is its northernmost point, Cape Byrd.

== History ==
Charcot Island was discovered on 11 January 1910 by the French Antarctic Expedition under Jean-Baptiste Charcot, who, at the insistence of his crew and the recommendation of Edwin S. Balch and others, named it Charcot Land. He did so with the stated intention of honoring his father, Jean-Martin Charcot, a famous French physician. The insularity of Charcot Land was proved by Sir Hubert Wilkins, who flew around it on 29 December 1929.

=== 2009 Collapse of ice bridge ===
The ice bridge holding the Wilkins Ice Shelf to the Antarctic coastline and Charcot Island was 40 kilometres (25 mi) long but only 500 metres (1,640 ft) wide at its narrowest point – in 1950 it was 100 kilometres (62 mi) It shattered in April 2009 over an area measuring 20.1 by 2.4 kilometres (12.5 by 1.5 mi). The ice bridge collapsed rapidly, turning into hundreds of icebergs.

== See also ==
- Composite Antarctic Gazetteer
- List of Antarctic and sub-Antarctic islands
- List of Antarctic islands south of 60° S
- SCAR
- Territorial claims in Antarctica
