= Hubert Wilkins =

Australian polar explorer (1888–1958)

Sir Hubert Wilkins MC
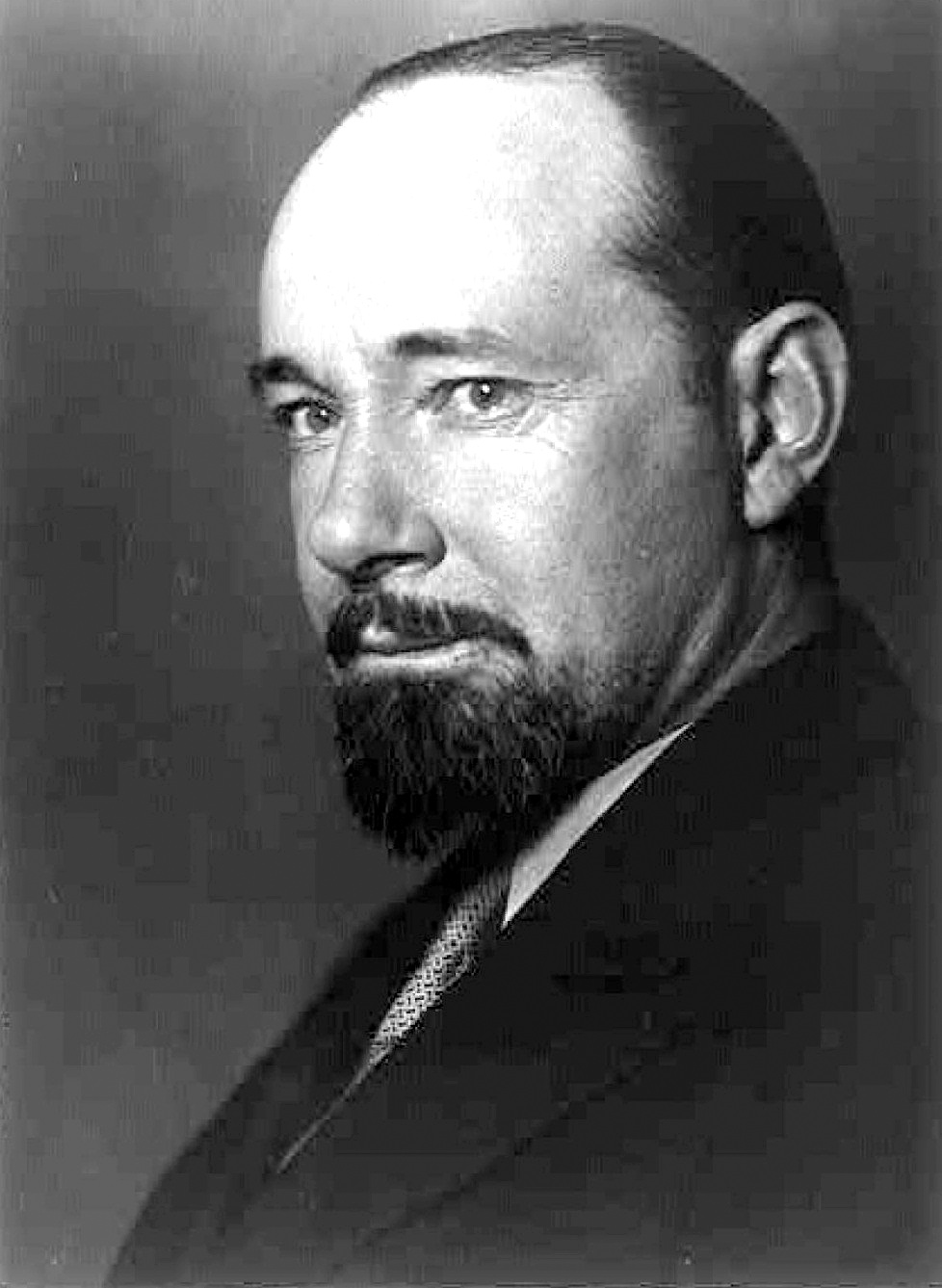
- Sir Hubert Wilkins (1931)
- Born: 31 October 1888; Mount Bryan East, South Australia
- Died: 30 November 1958 (aged 70); Framingham, Massachusetts
- Known for: Polar explorer
- Spouse: Suzanne Bennett
- Awards: Knight Bachelor; Military Cross & Bar

Sir George Hubert Wilkins MC & Bar (31 October 1888 – 30 November 1958), commonly referred to as Captain Wilkins, was an Australian polar explorer, ornithologist, pilot, soldier, geographer, and photographer. He was awarded the Military Cross after he assumed command of a group of American soldiers who had lost their officers during the Battle of the Hindenburg Line, and became the only official Australian photographer from any war to receive a combat medal. He narrowly failed in an attempt to be the first to cross under the North Pole in a submarine, but was able to prove that submarines were capable of operating beneath the polar ice cap, thereby paving the way for future successful missions. The US Navy later took his ashes to the North Pole aboard the submarine USS Skate on 17 March 1959.

== Early life and education ==
Hubert Wilkins was born on 31 October 1888 at Mount Bryan East, South Australia, the last of 13 children in a family of pioneer settlers and sheep farmers.

He was educated first in his home town, and then at the Adelaide School of Mines.

He moved to Adelaide as a teenager, finding work with a travelling cinema.

== Career ==
Wilkins moved to Sydney, where he worked as a cinematographer, before moving to England, where he became a pioneering aerial photographer while working for Gaumont Studios.

His photographic skill earned him a place on various Arctic expeditions, including the controversial 1913 Vilhjalmur Stefansson-led Canadian Arctic Expedition.

=== World War I ===
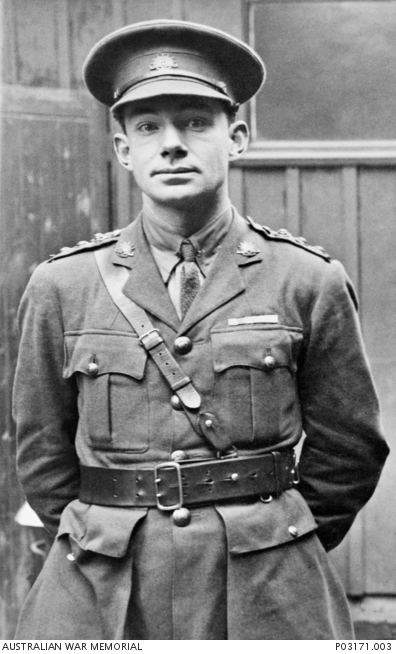
Captain Wilkins, 1918

In 1917, Wilkins returned to his native Australia, joining the Australian Flying Corps in the rank of second lieutenant. Wilkins later transferred to the general list and in 1918 was appointed as an official war photographer. In June 1918 Wilkins was awarded the Military Cross for his efforts to rescue wounded soldiers during the Third Battle of Ypres. He remains the only Australian official photographer from any war to have received a combat medal. The following month Wilkins was promoted to captain and became officer commanding No.3 (Photographic) Sub-section of the Australian war records unit.

Wilkins's work frequently led him into the thick of the fighting and during the Battle of the Hindenburg Line he assumed command of a group of American soldiers who had lost their officers in an earlier attack, directing them until support arrived. Wilkins was subsequently awarded a bar to his Military Cross in the 1919 Birthday Honours.

When Australian World War I general Sir John Monash was asked by the visiting American journalist Lowell Thomas (who had written With Lawrence in Arabia and made T. E. Lawrence an international hero) if Australia had a similar hero, Monash spoke of Wilkins: "Yes, there was one. He was a highly accomplished and absolutely fearless combat photographer. What happened to him is a story of epic proportions. Wounded many times ... he always came through. At times he brought in the wounded, at other times he supplied vital intelligence of enemy activity he observed. At one point he even rallied troops as a combat officer ... His record was unique."

=== After the war ===
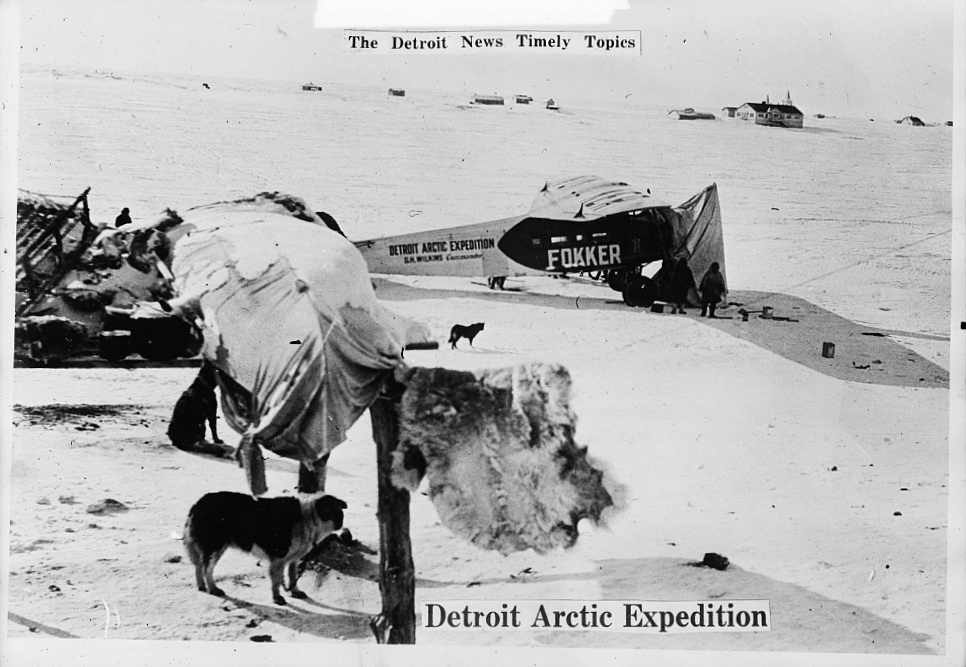
Detroit Arctic Expedition, 1926

After the war, Wilkins served in 1921–22 as an ornithologist aboard the Quest on the Shackleton–Rowett Expedition to the Southern Ocean and adjacent islands.

Wilkins in 1923 began a two-year study for the British Museum of the bird life of Northern Australia. This ornithology project occupied his life until 1925. His work was greatly acclaimed by the museum but derided by Australian authorities because of the sympathetic treatment afforded to Indigenous Australians and criticisms of the ongoing environmental damage in the country.

In March 1927, Wilkins and pilot Carl Ben Eielson explored the drift ice north of Alaska, touching down upon it in Eielson's airplane in the first land-plane descent onto drift ice. Soundings taken at the landing site indicated a water depth of 16,000 ft (4,900 m), and Wilkins hypothesised from the experience that future Arctic expeditions would take advantage of the wide expanses of open ice to use aircraft in exploration.

On 15 April 1928, a year after Charles Lindbergh's flight across the Atlantic, Wilkins and Eielson began a trans-Arctic crossing from Point Barrow, Alaska, to Green Harbour, Spitsbergen, arriving after 21 hours of flight time and a five-day layover on Deadman's Island (Likholmen) off of Spitsbergen's northeast coast. For this feat and his prior work, Wilkins was knighted in the 1928 Birthday Honours, and during the ensuing celebration in New York, he met an Australian actress, Suzanne Bennett, whom he later married.

In December 1928, Wilkins and Eielson took off from Deception Island, one of Antarctic's most remote islands, and made the first successful airplane flight over the continent, flying along the eastern coast of the Antarctic Peninsula.

Now financed by William Randolph Hearst, Wilkins continued his polar explorations, flying over Antarctica in the San Francisco. He named the island of Hearst Land after his sponsor, and Hearst thanked Wilkins by giving him and his bride a flight aboard Graf Zeppelin.

=== Nautilus expedition ===
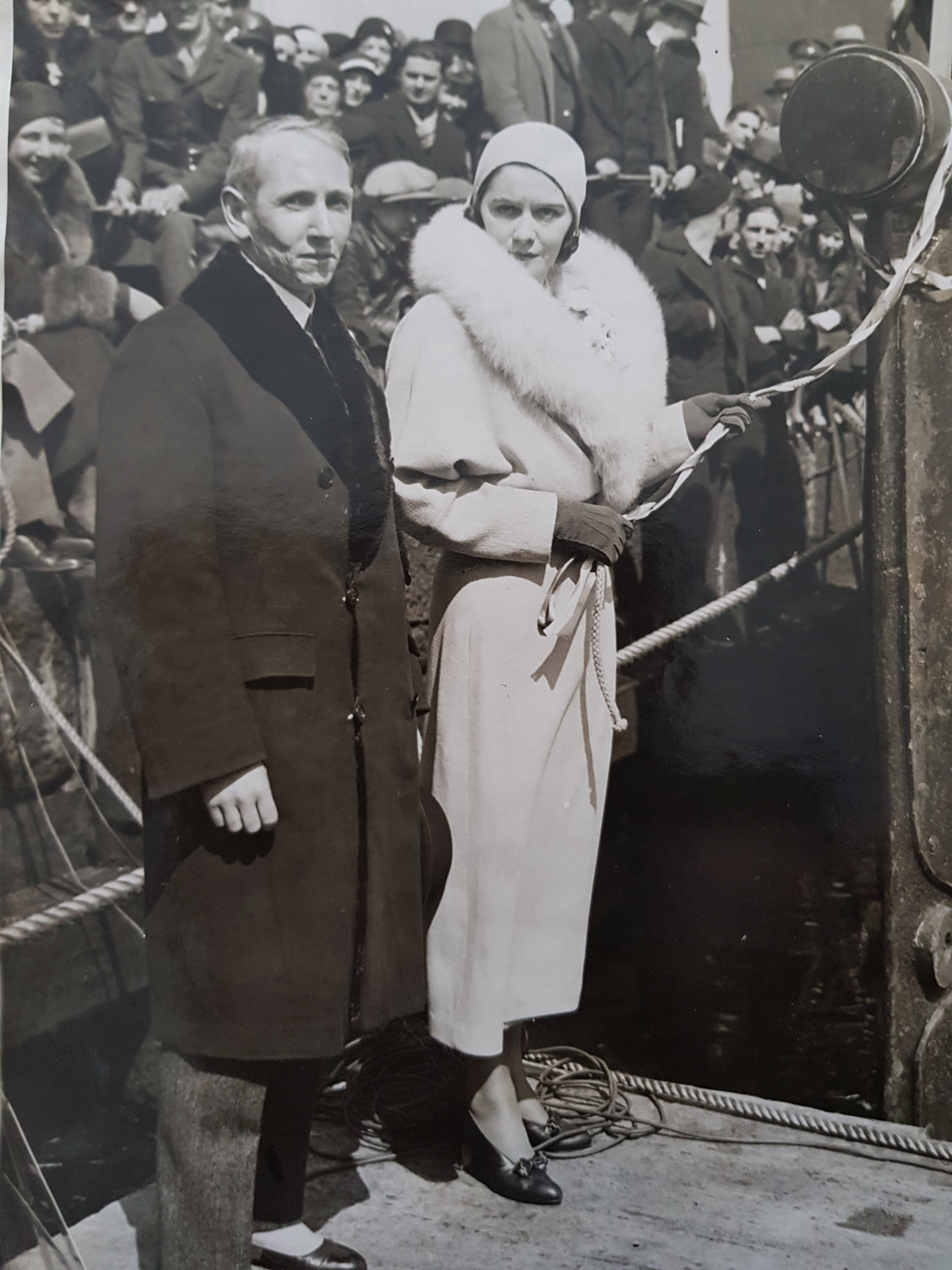
Jean Jules Verne and Suzanne Wilkins in 1931

In 1930 Wilkins and his wife, Suzanne, were vacationing with a wealthy friend and colleague Lincoln Ellsworth. During this outing Wilkins and Ellsworth hammered out plans for a trans-Arctic expedition involving a submarine. Wilkins said the expedition was meant to conduct a "comprehensive meteorology study" and collect "data of academic and economic interest". He also anticipated Arctic weather stations and the potential to forecast Arctic weather "several years in advance". Wilkins believed a submarine could take a fully equipped laboratory into the Arctic.

Ellsworth contributed $70,000, plus a $20,000 loan. Newspaper tycoon William Randolph Hearst purchased exclusive rights to the story for $61,000. The Woods Hole Oceanographic Institute contributed a further $35,000. Wilkins himself added $25,000 of his own money. Since Wilkins was not a U.S. citizen, he was unable to purchase the 1918 submarine scheduled to be decommissioned, but he was permitted to lease the vessel for a period of five years at a cost of one dollar annually from Lake & Danenhower, Inc. The submarine was the disarmed O-12, and was commanded by Sloan Danenhower (former commanding officer of C-4.) Wilkins renamed her Nautilus, after Jules Verne's 20,000 Leagues Under the Sea. The submarine was outfitted with a custom-designed drill that would allow her to bore through ice pack overhead for ventilation. The crew of eighteen men was chosen with great care. Among their ranks were U.S. Naval Academy graduates as well as navy veterans of World War I.

Wilkins described the planned expedition in his 1931 book Under The North Pole, which Wonder Stories praised as "[as] exciting as it is epochal".

The expedition suffered losses before they even left New York Harbor. Quartermaster Willard Grimmer was knocked overboard and drowned in the harbor.

Wilkins was undaunted and drove on with preparations for a series of test cruises and dives before they were to undertake their trans-Arctic voyage. Wilkins and his crew made their way up the Hudson River to Yonkers, eventually reaching New London, Connecticut, where additional modifications and test dives were performed. Satisfied with the performance of both the machinery and the crew, Wilkins and his men left the relative safety of coastal waterways for the uncertainty of the North Atlantic on 4 June 1931.

Soon after the commencement of the expedition the starboard engine broke down, and soon after that the port engine followed suit. On 14 June 1931 without a means of propulsion Wilkins was forced to send out an SOS and was rescued later that day by the USS Wyoming. The Nautilus was towed to Ireland on 22 June 1931, and was taken to England for repairs.

On 28 June the Nautilus was up and running and on her way to Norway to pick up the scientific contingent of their crew. By 23 August they had left Norway and were only 600 miles from the North Pole. It was at this time that Wilkins uncovered another setback. His submarine was missing its diving planes. Without diving planes he would be unable to control the Nautilus while submerged.

Wilkins was determined to do what he could without the diving planes. For the most part Wilkins was thwarted from discovery under the ice floes. The crew was able to take core samples of the ice, as well as testing the salinity of the water and gravity near the pole.

Wilkins had to acknowledge that his adventure into the Arctic was becoming too foolhardy when he received a wireless plea from Hearst which said, "I most urgently beg of you to return promptly to safety and to defer any further adventure to a more favorable time, and with a better boat."

Wilkins ended the first expedition to the poles in a submarine and headed for England, but was forced to take refuge in the port of Bergen, Norway, because of a fierce storm that they encountered en route. The Nautilus suffered serious damage that made further use of the vessel unfeasible. Wilkins received permission from the United States Navy to sink the vessel off shore in a Norwegian fjord on 20 November 1931.

Despite the failure to meet his intended objective, he was able to prove that submarines were capable of operating beneath the polar ice cap, thereby paving the way for future successful missions.

== Later life ==
Wilkins became a student of The Urantia Book and supporter of the Urantia movement after joining the '70' group in Chicago in 1942. After the book's publication in 1955, he "carried the massive work on his long travels, even to the Antarctic" and told associates that it was his religion.

On 16 March 1958, Wilkins appeared as a guest on the TV panel show What's My Line?

== Recognition ==
Wilkins was the first recipient of the Samuel Finley Breese Morse Medal, which was awarded to him by the American Geographical Society in 1928. He was also awarded the Royal Geographical Society's Patron's Medal the same year.

Wilkins was elected to the American Philosophical Society in 1930.

== Death and legacy ==
Wilkins died in Framingham, Massachusetts, on 30 November 1958. The US Navy later took his ashes to the North Pole aboard the submarine USS Skate on 17 March 1959. The Navy confirmed on 27 March that, "In a solemn memorial ceremony conducted by Skate shortly after surfacing, the ashes of Sir Hubert Wilkins were scattered at the North Pole in accordance with his last wishes."

=== Collections and projects ===
His wife Suzanne inherited the farm at Montrose, Pennsylvania, as well as her husband's collection of films, photographs, papers, and various other artefacts were stored indiscriminately in around in 200 boxes in a barn. There were no children of the marriage. Suzanne subsequently lived with a man called Winston Ross for over 30 years, who inherited the farm and contents upon her death in 1974. Ross married Marley Shofner, who had two sons to previous husbands, and the pair, who did not understand its value nor knew much about Australian history, began selling some of it to fund their lifestyle. In 1985, they sold a large batch to the Ohio State University in Columbus, Ohio, which was setting up a polar archive at the time. After the couple's deaths in the 1990s, Shofner's sons inherited the farm and what was left of Wilkins' collection. They sold the farm and the material moved elsewhere.

Australian businessman and adventurer Dick Smith bought Wilkins' 1939 Chevrolet station wagon from Ross and Shofner and had it shipped to Australia. In 2024 he donated it to the National Motor Museum at Birdwood, South Australia, for public display. The Wilkins family homestead at Mount Bryan East, in the Mid North, has also been restored thanks to the philanthropy of Smith.

Ohio State University catalogued its large collection and made it available to researchers at their Byrd Polar and Climate Research Center, while other items from Wilkins' collections is scattered around other publicly accessible museums and archives around the world. Some remains privately owned.

In 2015, a group of people in Adelaide established the Sir Hubert Wilkins Interest Group, which later transformed into the Wilkins Foundation. In 2023 the History Trust of South Australia took over the papers of the Wilkins Foundation and founded the Wilkins Project. A variety of specialists formed a committee with the aim of conserving the records and legacy of Wilkins, and educate others about his life.

The Sir Hubert Wilkins Oration (aka the Wilkins Oration) is presented by the History Trust of South Australia in association with the Wilkins Project. In 2023, Emma McEwin, great-granddaughter of geologist and polar explorer Douglas Mawson, presented the lecture, "explor[ing] the personalities and backgrounds of both Hubert Wilkins and Douglas Mawson". In 2025, Dr Richard Harris, patron of the Wilkins Project and known for his part in the 2018 Thai cave rescue of a group of stranded schoolboys, discussed "his mission to encourage young people to unlock their inner explorer".

=== Places ===
The Wilkins Sound, Wilkins Coast, the Wilkins Runway aerodrome, and the Wilkins Ice Shelf in Antarctica are named after him. The airport at Jamestown, South Australia, and Sir Hubert Wilkins Road at Adelaide Airport as well as the Wilkins Highway in the mid-North of South Australia are also named in his memory.

=== Species ===
A species of Australian skink, Lerista wilkinsi, is named after him, as is a species of rock wallaby, Petrogale wilkinsi, first described in 2014.

=== In popular culture ===
Wilkins is briefly portrayed by actor John Dease in the 1946 film Smithy (1946).

== Works ==
- 1917 "Report on topographical and geographical work". Canadian Arctic Expedition. Ottawa: J. de Labroquerie Taché. 1917.
- 1928 Flying the Arctic. Grosset & Dunlap. 1928.
- 1928 Undiscovered Australia. Putnam. 1998. ISBN 9780859052450.
- 1931 Under The North Pole. Brewer, Warren & Putnam. 1931.
- 1942 with Harold M. Sherman: Thoughts Through Space, Creative Age Press. Republished as Thoughts Through Space: A Remarkable Adventure in the Realm of Mind. Hampton Roads Publishing Co. 2004. ISBN 1-57174-314-6.

== See also ==
- Thomas George Lanphier, Sr.
