= Pimpirev Peak =

Mountain in Antarctica

Location of Alexander Island in the Antarctic Peninsula region

Satellite image of Alexander Island

Pimpirev Peak (Bulgarian: Пимпирев връх, romanized: Pimpirev vrah, IPA: [pimˈpirɛv ˈvrɤx]) is the ice-covered peak rising to 2565 m on the west side of Rouen Mountains in northern Alexander Island, Antarctica. It surmounts Frachat Glacier to the southeast, Russian Gap to the west and Mozgovitsa Glacier to the north-northwest. The peak was visited on 7 January 1988 by the geologists Christo Pimpirev and Borislav Kamenov during the First Bulgarian Antarctic Expedition.

The feature was named "after the Bulgarian scientist Christo Pimpirev, doyen and leader of the national Antarctic programme."

== Location ==
Pimpirev Peak is located at 69°08′20″S 71°01′14″W, which is 10.7 km north-northwest of Paroriya Buttress, 15.92 km southwest of Mount Hankey, 13.74 km northwest of Mount Hall, and 18.5 km northeast of Breze Peak and 17.5 km east-northeast of Mount Newman in Havre Mountains.

== Maps ==
- British Antarctic Territory. Scale 1:200000 topographic map. DOS 610 – W 69 70. Tolworth, UK, 1971
- Antarctic Digital Database (ADD). Scale 1:250000 topographic map of Antarctica. Scientific Committee on Antarctic Research (SCAR). Since 1993, regularly upgraded and updated
