= Galabov Ridge =

Ridge in Alexander Island, Antarctica

Location of Alexander Island in the Antarctic Peninsula region

Satellite image of Alexander Island

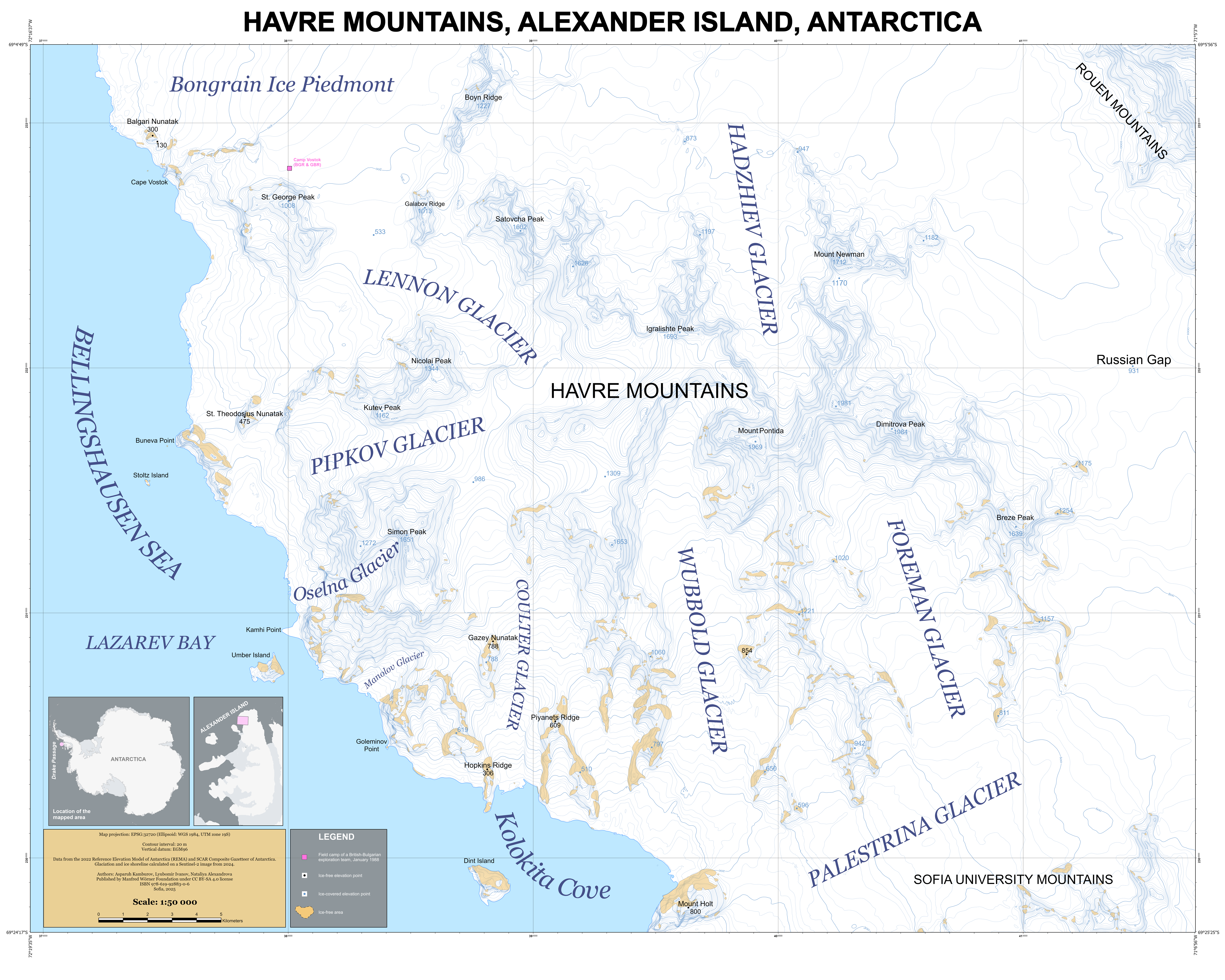
Map of Havre Mountains, Alexander Island in Antarctica

Galabov Ridge (Bulgarian: Гълъбов рид, ‘Galabov Rid’ \'g&-l&-bov 'rid\) is the mostly ice-covered ridge extending 2.5 km in north-northeast to south-southwest direction, 1.4 km wide and rising to 1010 m just southwest of Boyn Ridge in Havre Mountains, northern Alexander Island in Antarctica. It surmounts Bongrain Ice Piedmont to the northwest and Lennon Glacier to the south. The vicinity was visited on 4 January 1988 by the geological survey team of Christo Pimpirev and Borislav Kamenov (First Bulgarian Antarctic Expedition), and Philip Nell and Peter Marquis (British Antarctic Survey).

The feature was named after Teodor Galabov (1870-1925), head of the Stenographic Office at the National Assembly that developed an early ergonomic keyboard in 1907, adopted as the standard Bulgarian keyboard.

== Location ==
The peak is located at 69°08′54″S 71°52′49″W, which is 5.76 km east of Saint George Peak, 4.07 km west-northwest of Satovcha Peak and 6.33 km north of Nicolai Peak. British mapping in 1971.

== Maps ==
- British Antarctic Territory. Scale 1:200000 topographic map. DOS 610 – W 69 70. Tolworth, UK, 1971
- Antarctic Digital Database (ADD). Scale 1:250000 topographic map of Antarctica. Scientific Committee on Antarctic Research (SCAR). Since 1993, regularly upgraded and updated
