= Paroriya Buttress =

Location of Alexander Island in the Antarctic Peninsula region

Satellite image of Alexander Island

Paroriya Buttress (Bulgarian: рид Парория, ‘Rid Paroriya’ \'rid pa-'ro-ri-ya) is the mostly ice-covered ridge extending 9 km in northeast-southwest direction and 5.75 km wide, rising to 2872 m on the west side of Rouen Mountains in northern Alexander Island, Antarctica. It surmounts Rosselin Glacier to the south, the head of Palestrina Glacier to the southwest, Russian Gap to the northwest and Frachat Glacier to the north-northwest. The buttress was visited on 10 January 1988 by the geological survey team of Christo Pimpirev and Borislav Kamenov (First Bulgarian Antarctic Expedition), and Philip Nell and Peter Marquis (British Antarctic Survey).

The feature was named after the region of Paroriya in medieval Southeastern Bulgaria.

== Location ==
Paroriya Buttress is located at 69°13′05″S 70°53′26.2″W, which is 10.2 km south-southeast of Pimpirev Peak, 7.8 km southwest of Mount Hall, 9.7 km northwest of Mount Sanderson, and 16.8 km east-northeast of Breze Peak in Havre Mountains.

== Maps ==
- British Antarctic Territory. Scale 1:200000 topographic map. DOS 610 – W 69 70. Tolworth, UK, 1971
- Antarctic Digital Database (ADD). Scale 1:250000 topographic map of Antarctica. Scientific Committee on Antarctic Research (SCAR). Since 1993, regularly upgraded and updated
