= Danailov Peak =

Mountain in Antarctica

Location of Alexander Island in the Antarctic Peninsula region

Satellite image of Alexander Island

Danailov Peak (Bulgarian: Данаилов връх, romanized: Danailov vrah, IPA: [dɐnɐˈiɫɔv vrɤx]) is the ice-covered peak rising to 2695 m on the west side of Rouen Mountains in northern Alexander Island, Antarctica. It surmounts Frachat Glacier on the south and Mozgovitsa Glacier on the west. The peak's vicinity was visited on 6 January 1988 by the geological team of Christo Pimpirev and Borislav Kamenov (First Bulgarian Antarctic Expedition), and Philip Nell and Peter Marquis (British Antarctic Survey).

The feature is named after Captain 2nd rank Nikolay Danailov, first commander of the polar research vessel Sts. Cyril and Methodius of the Nikola Vaptsarov Naval Academy in Varna and the Bulgarian Antarctic Institute.

== Location ==
Danailov Peak is located at 69°05′05.2″S 70°58′17.7″W, which is 14 km south-southwest of Mount Paris, 8.5 km west of Mednikarov Peak and 6.23 km north-northeast of Pimpirev Peak.

== Maps ==
- British Antarctic Territory. Scale 1:200000 topographic map. DOS 610 – W 69 70. Tolworth, UK, 1971
- British Antarctic Survey, 2025. Alexander Island, 1:500 000 scale map. BAS Topographic Series, Sheet 4, Edition 1. Cambridge, British Antarctic Survey.
- Antarctic Digital Database (ADD). Scale 1:250000 topographic map of Antarctica. Scientific Committee on Antarctic Research (SCAR). Since 1993, regularly upgraded and updated
