= Hadzhiev Glacier =

Antarctic glacier

Location of Alexander Island in the Antarctic Peninsula region

Satellite image of Alexander Island

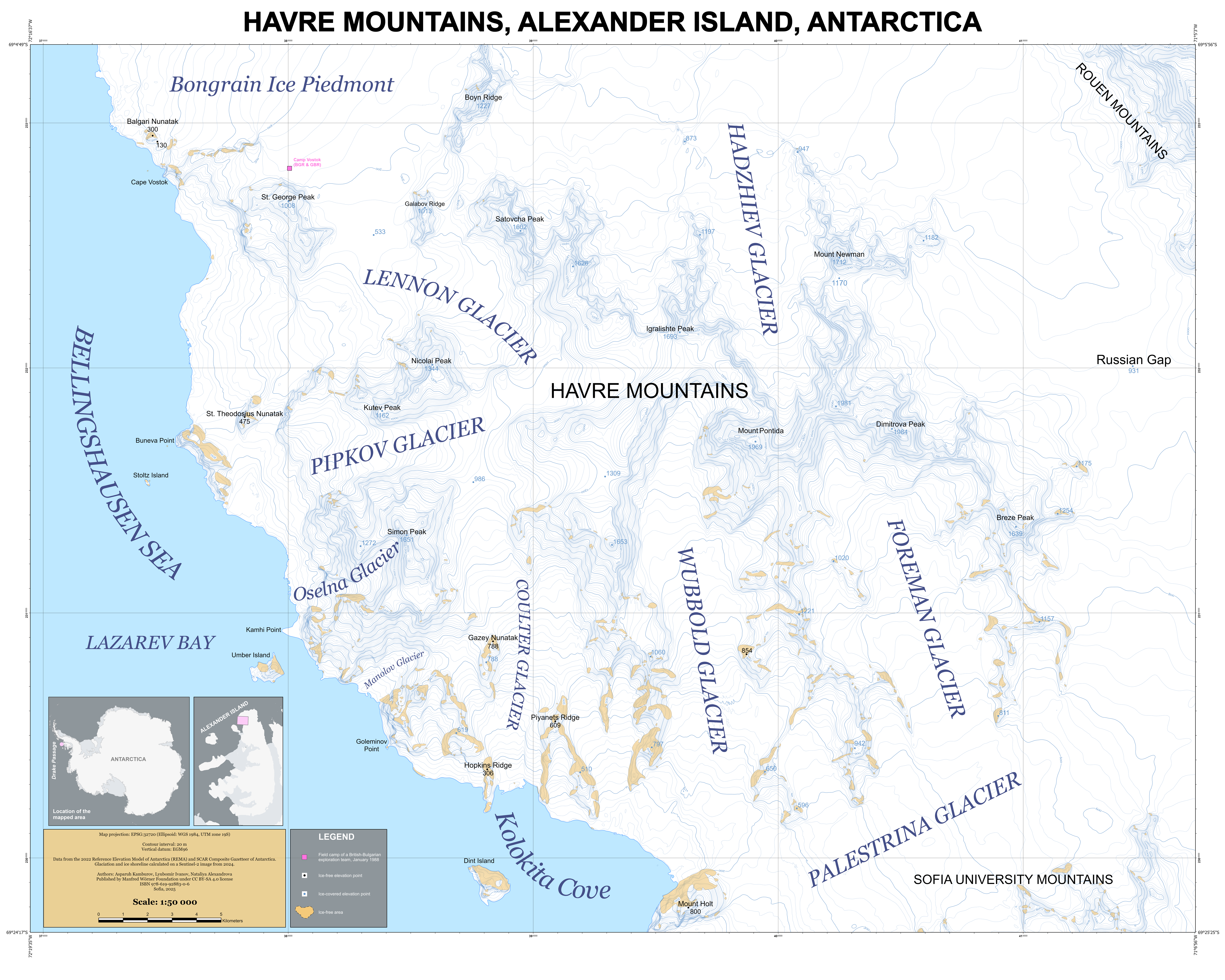
Map of Havre Mountains, Alexander Island in Antarctica

Hadzhiev Glacier (Bulgarian: Хаджиев ледник, romanized: Hadzhiev lednik, IPA: [xɐˈd͡ʒiɛf ˈlɛdnik]) is the 12 km long in south–north direction and 4 km wide glacier on the north side of Havre Mountains in northern Alexander Island, Antarctica. It is situated north-northwest of Foreman Glacier, north of Wubbold Glacier and east of Lennon Glacier, flows northwards between Igralishte Peak on the west and Mount Newman on the east, leaves Havre Mountains and joins Bongrain Ice Piedmont.

The feature is named after the Bulgarian composer Parashkev Hadzhiev (1912–1992).

== Location ==
Hadzhiev Glacier is centered at 69°10′40″S 71°32′20″W. British mapping in 1971.

== Maps ==
- British Antarctic Territory. Scale 1:200000 topographic map. DOS 610 – W 69 70. Tolworth, UK, 1971
- Antarctic Digital Database (ADD). Scale 1:250000 topographic map of Antarctica. Scientific Committee on Antarctic Research (SCAR). Since 1993, regularly upgraded and updated
