= Dimitrova Peak =

Peak on Alexander Island, Antarctica

Highest point
- Elevation: 1,990 m (6,530 ft)
- Prominence: 1,061 m (3,481 ft)
- Listing: Ribu

Location of Alexander Island in the Antarctic Peninsula region

Satellite image of Alexander Island

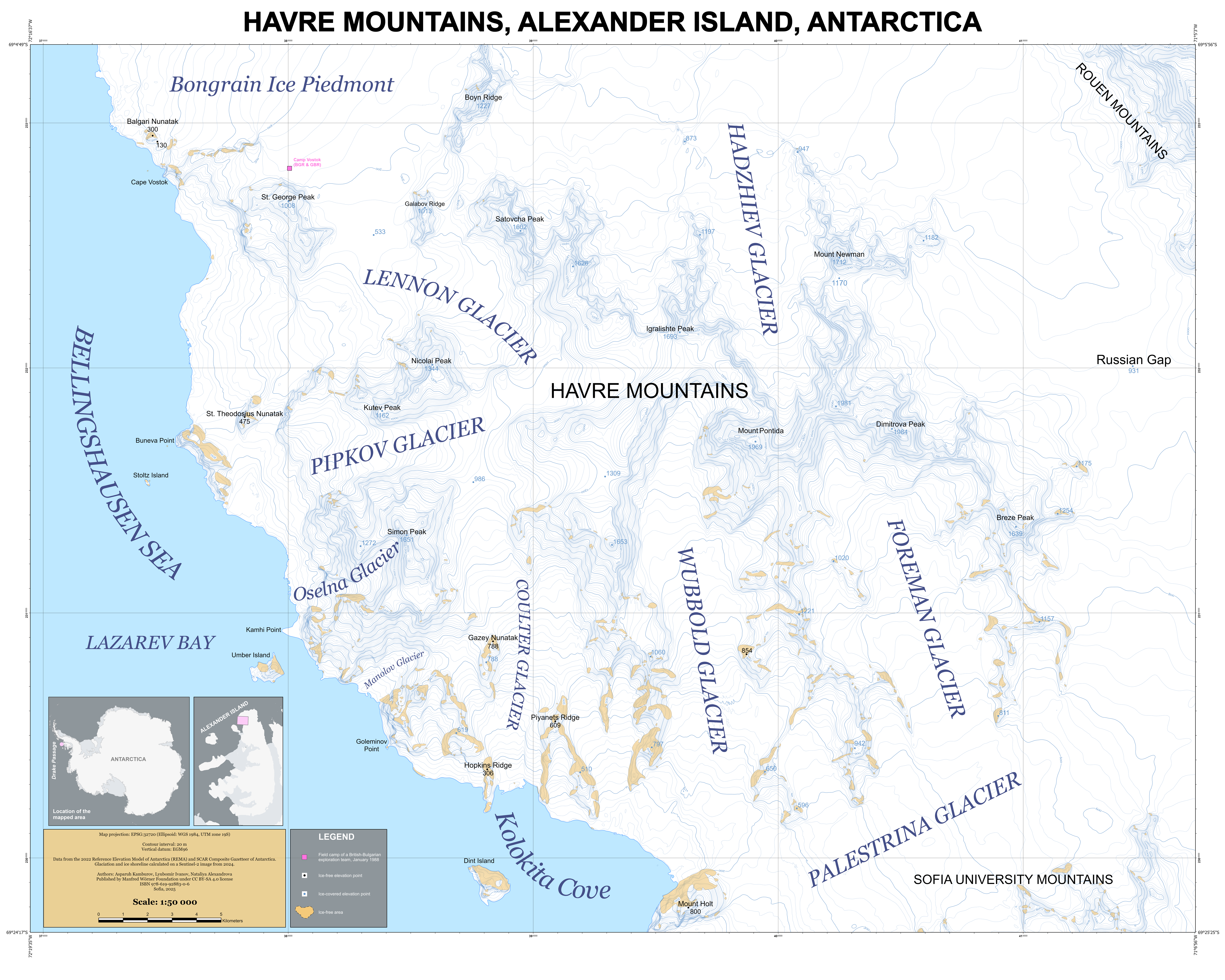
Map of Havre Mountains, Alexander Island in Antarctica

Dimitrova Peak (Bulgarian: връх Димитрова, romanized: vrah Dimitrova, IPA: [ˈvrɤɣ dimiˈtrɔvɐ]) is the mostly ice-covered peak rising to 1984 m in eastern Havre Mountains, northern Alexander Island in Antarctica. It is the summit of Havre Mountains. The peak has steep and partly ice-free southwest slopes, and surmounts Russian Gap to the northeast and Foreman Glacier to the south. The vicinity was visited on 8 January 1988 by the geological survey team of Christo Pimpirev and Borislav Kamenov (First Bulgarian Antarctic Expedition), and Philip Nell and Peter Marquis (British Antarctic Survey).

The feature is named after the Bulgarian opera singer Ghena Dimitrova (1941-2005).

== Location ==
Dimitrova Peak is located at 69°14′21″S 71°24′15″W, which is 5.7 km east of Mount Pontida, 7.62 km south-southeast of Mount Newman and 21 km northeast of Mount Holt. British mapping in 1971.

== Maps ==
- British Antarctic Territory. Scale 1:200000 topographic map. DOS 610 – W 69 70. Tolworth, UK, 1971
- Antarctic Digital Database (ADD). Scale 1:250000 topographic map of Antarctica. Scientific Committee on Antarctic Research (SCAR). Since 1993, regularly upgraded and updated
