= Igralishte Peak =

Peak on Alexander Island, Antarctica

Location of Alexander Island in the Antarctic Peninsula region

Satellite image of Alexander Island

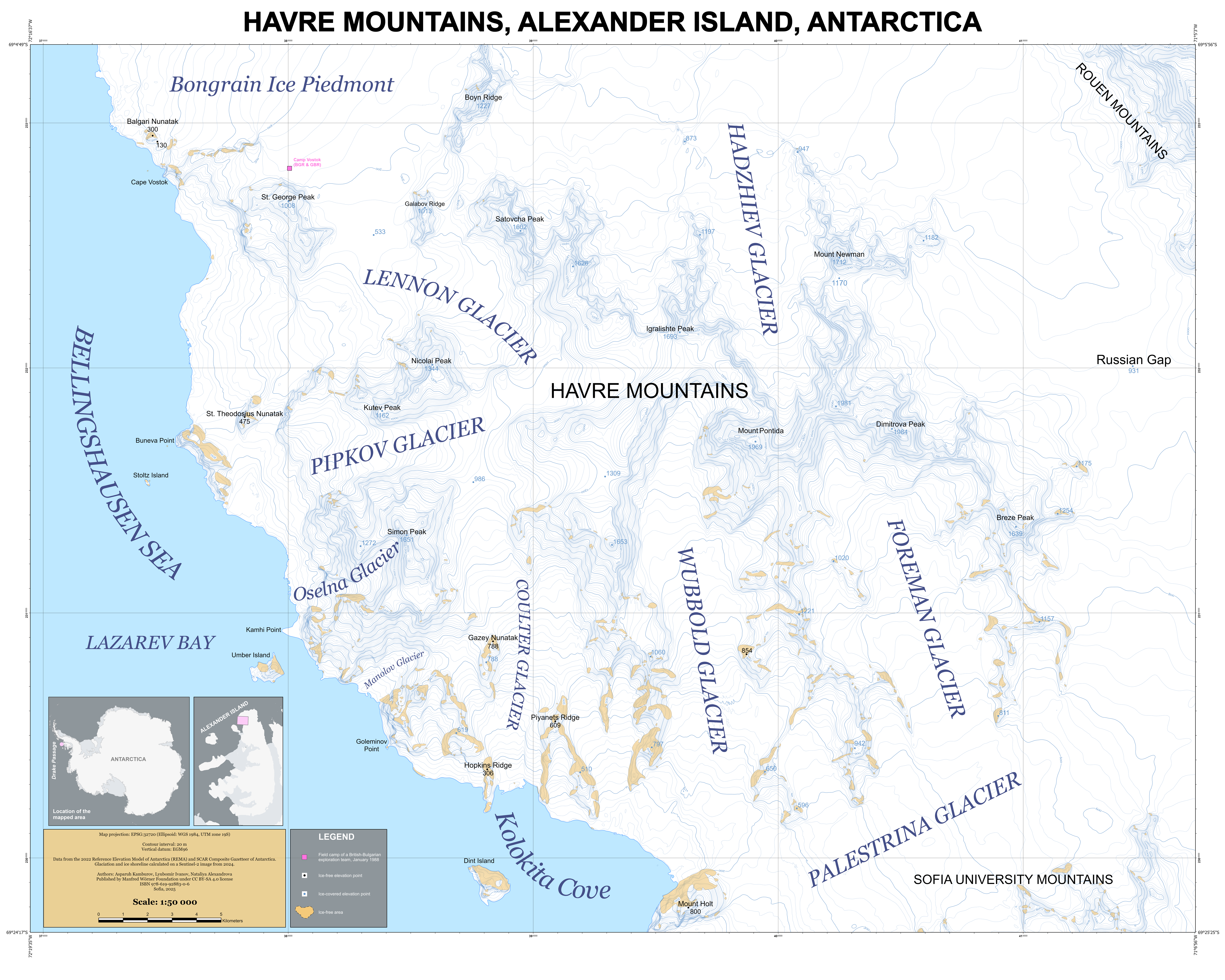
Map of Havre Mountains, Alexander Island in Antarctica

Igralishte Peak (Bulgarian: връх Игралище, romanized: vrah Igralishte, IPA: [ˈvrɤx iˈɡraliʃtɛ]) is the ice-covered peak rising to 1690 m in Havre Mountains, northern Alexander Island in Antarctica. It surmounts Hadzhiev Glacier to the northeast and Wubbold Glacier to the south. The feature is named after the settlement of Igralishte in Southwestern Bulgaria.

== Location ==
The peak is located at 69°11′51″S 71°37′19″W, which is 10.17 km east of Nicolai Peak, 7.73 km southeast of Satovcha Peak, 7.34 km west-southwest of Mount Newman and 5.42 km northwest of Mount Pontida.

== Maps ==
- British Antarctic Territory. Scale 1:200000 topographic map. DOS 610 – W 69 70. Tolworth, UK, 1971
- Antarctic Digital Database (ADD). Scale 1:250000 topographic map of Antarctica. Scientific Committee on Antarctic Research (SCAR). Since 1993, regularly upgraded and updated
