= Mozgovitsa Glacier =

Glacier in Antarctica

Location of Alexander Island in the Antarctic Peninsula region

Satellite image of Alexander Island

Mozgovitsa Glacier (Bulgarian: ледник Мозговица, romanized: lednik Mozgovitsa, IPA: [ˈlɛdnik ˈmɔzɡovit͡sɐ]) is a 10 km long in southeast-northwest direction and 2.5 km wide glacier on the northwest side of Rouen Mountains in northern Alexander Island, Antarctica. It is situated north-northwest of Frachat Glacier and north-northeast of Russian Gap. The glacier drains the north slopes of Pimpirev Peak, flows northwestwards between Senouque Spurs, leaves Rouen Mountains and joins Bongrain Ice Piedmont. The vicinity was visited on 6 and 7 January 1988, by the geological survey team of Christo Pimpirev and Borislav Kamenov (First Bulgarian Antarctic Expedition), and Philip Nell and Peter Marquis (British Antarctic Survey).

The feature is named after Mozgovitsa River in Pirin Mountains, Bulgaria.

== Location ==
Mozgovitsa Glacier is centered at 69°04′10″S 71°07′40″W.

== Maps ==
- British Antarctic Territory. Scale 1:200000 topographic map. DOS 610 – W 69 70. Tolworth, UK, 1971
- Antarctic Digital Database (ADD). Scale 1:250000 topographic map of Antarctica. Scientific Committee on Antarctic Research (SCAR). Since 1993, regularly upgraded and updated
