= Breze =

Breze may refer to:

- Breže, Ribnica, a village in southern Slovenia
- Brézé, a village in Maine-et-Loire, western France
- Breze, Tuzla, a village in Bosnia and Herzegovina
- Breze, Sofia Province, a village in Bulgaria
- Breze, Smolyan Province, a village in Bulgaria
- Breze, old name of Šentrupert, Laško
- Brézé (surname), a French noble family
- Breze, Croatia, a village near Novi Vinodolski
