= Satovcha Peak =

Peak on Alexander Island, Antarctica

Location of Alexander Island in the Antarctic Peninsula region

Satellite image of Alexander Island

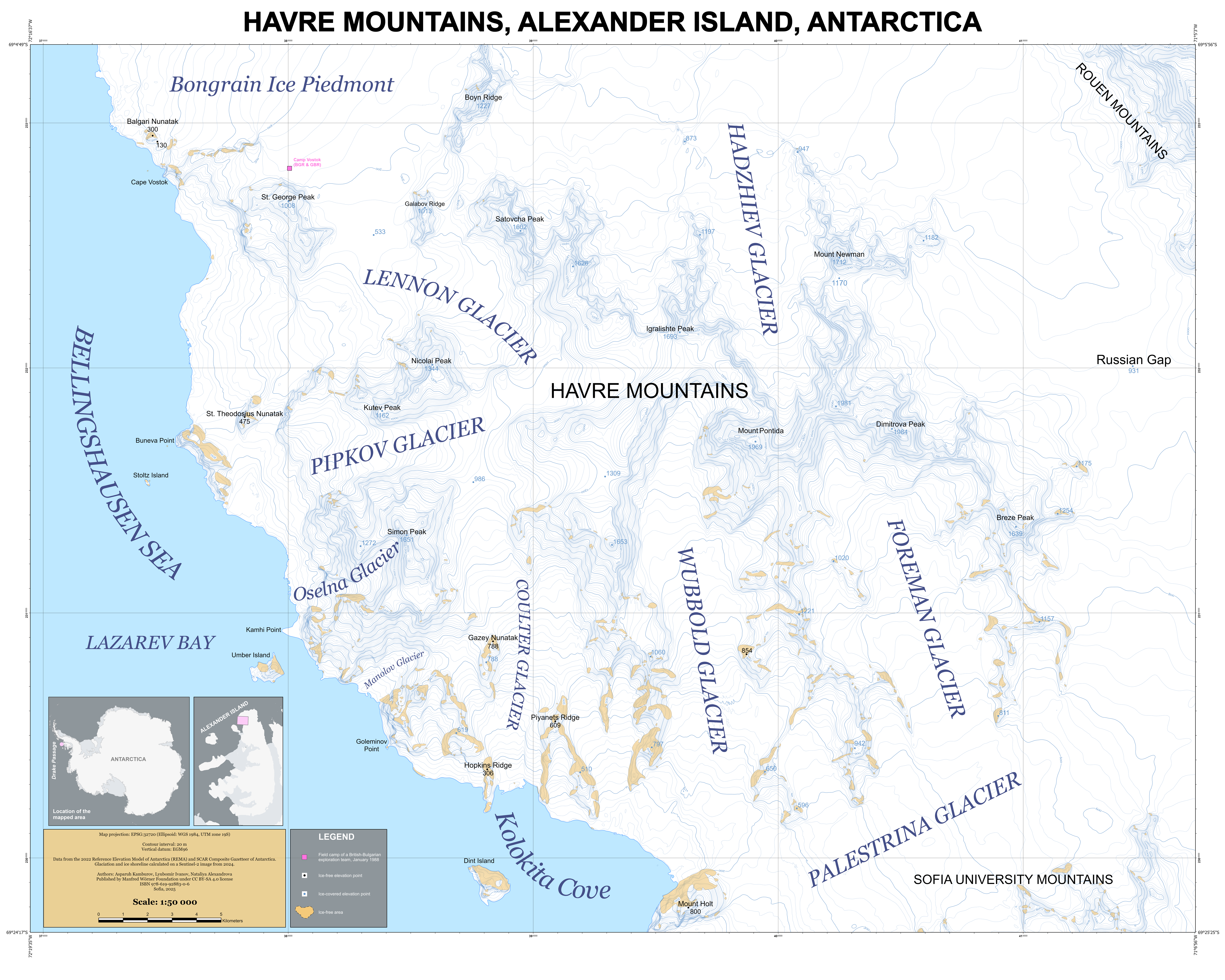
Map of Havre Mountains, Alexander Island in Antarctica

Satovcha Peak (Bulgarian: връх Сатовча, romanized: vrah Satovcha, IPA: [ˈvrɤx sɐˈtɔft͡ʃɐ]) is the mostly ice-covered peak rising to 1587 m in Havre Mountains, northern Alexander Island in Antarctica. It surmounts Bongrain Ice Piedmont to the northeast and Lennon Glacier to the southwest. Its south slopes are precipitous and partly ice-free. The vicinity was visited on 4 January 1988 by the geological survey party of Christo Pimpirev and Borislav Kamenov (First Bulgarian Antarctic Expedition), and Philip Nell and Peter Marquis (British Antarctic Survey).

The feature is named after the settlement of Satovcha in Southwestern Bulgaria.

== Location ==
The peak is located at 69°09′27″S 71°46′52″W, which is 14.88 km east-southeast of Cape Vostok, 5.6 km south-southeast of Boyn Ridge, 13.23 km west by north of Mount Newman, 7.73 km northwest of Igralishte Peak and 6.54 km northeast of Nicolai Peak.

== Maps ==
- British Antarctic Territory. Scale 1:200000 topographic map. DOS 610 – W 69 70. Tolworth, UK, 1971
- Antarctic Digital Database (ADD). Scale 1:250000 topographic map of Antarctica. Scientific Committee on Antarctic Research (SCAR). Since 1993, regularly upgraded and updated
