= Mount Pontida =

Mountain on Alexander Island, Antarctica

Location of Alexander Island in the Antarctic Peninsula region

Satellite image of Alexander Island

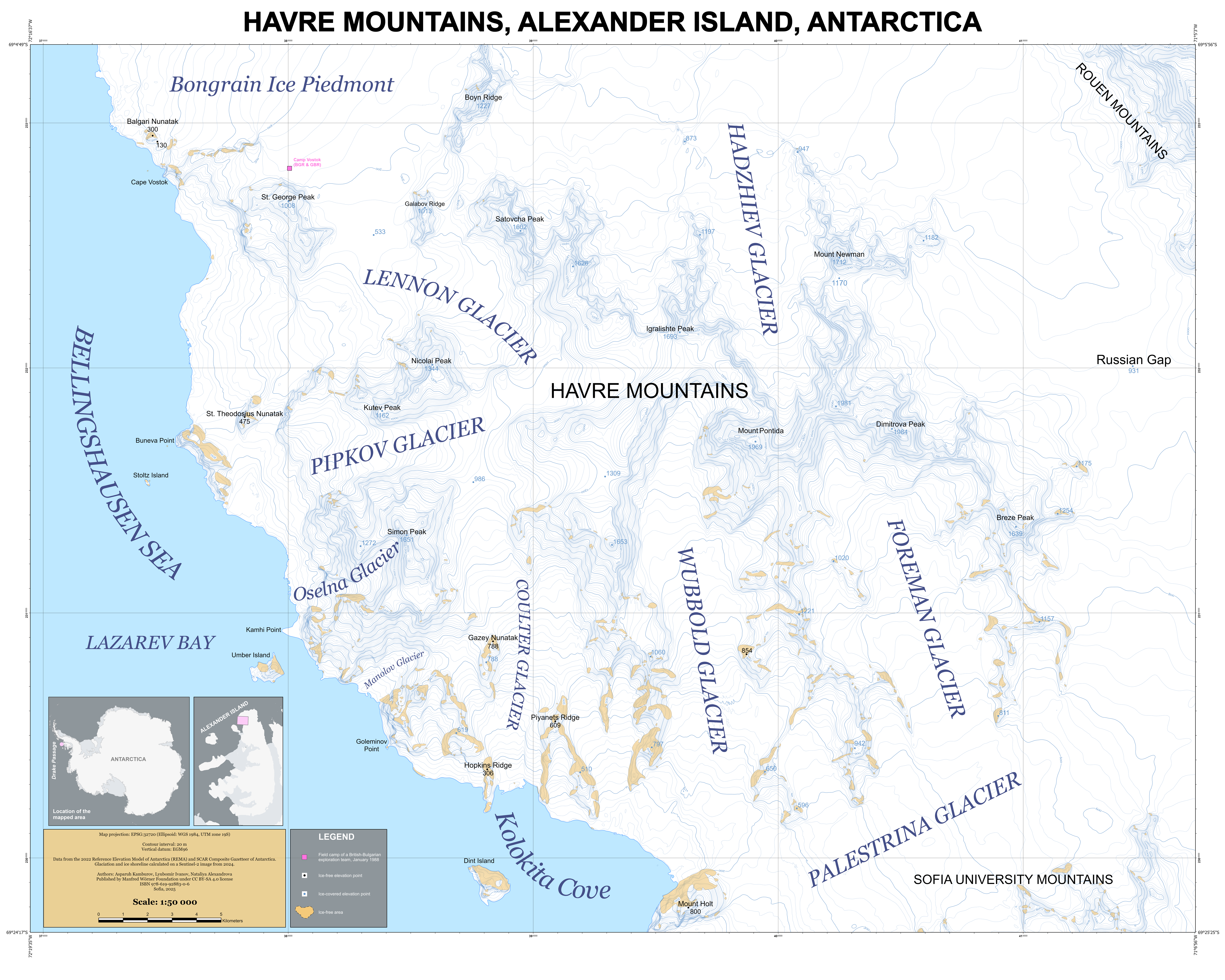
Map of Havre Mountains, Alexander Island in Antarctica

Mount Pontida (Bulgarian: връх Понтида, romanized: vrah Pontida, IPA: [ˈvrɤx ponˈtidɐ]) is the ice-covered mountain rising to 1965 m in Havre Mountains, northern Alexander Island in Antarctica. It surmounts Hadzhiev Glacier to the north, Foreman Glacier to the southeast and Wubbold Glacier to the southwest. British mapping in 1971. The feature is named after the hypothetical lost land of Pontida located in Black Sea.

== Location ==
The mountain is located at 69°14′17.7″S 71°32′51″W, which is 14.65 km east of Simon Peak, 5.42 km southeast of Igralishte Peak, 8.26 km southwest of Mount Newman, 5.7 km west of Dimitrova Peak and 19.2 km north-northeast of Mount Holt.

== Maps ==
- British Antarctic Territory. Scale 1:200000 topographic map. DOS 610 – W 69 70. Tolworth, UK, 1971
- Antarctic Digital Database (ADD). Scale 1:250000 topographic map of Antarctica. Scientific Committee on Antarctic Research (SCAR). Since 1993, regularly upgraded and updated
