= Marina Mader-Todorova =

Bulgarian-Austrian operatic soprano

Marina Mader-Todorova (born Marina Todorova, 20 August 1949 in Silistra, Bulgaria) is a Bulgarian-Austrian operatic soprano who built an international career in the 1970s and 1980s. She initially studied violin and voice in Bulgaria before completing her training in Vienna. After making her operatic debut in Varna she sang leading roles across Western Europe and North America and later settled in Austria. Her repertoire includes lyric and spinto roles in Italian, German and French opera, as well as concert and oratorio work.

== Life and career ==
Todorova was born in Silistra on 20 August 1949. Her father was a dentist, and her family encouraged her musical education. She studied violin and graduated from the music gymnasium in Varna, then switched to voice, studying at the Sofia State Academy of Music under Georgi Zlatev-Cherkin — a pupil of the celebrated soprano Ljuba Welitsch — and receiving additional coaching from stage director Dragan Kardzhiev and composer Lyubomir Pipkov, with whom she studied oratorio and song for two years. She continued her studies at the Vienna Music Academy with Maria Brand, a professor at the Academy.

She made her operatic debut at the Varna Opera as Kalinka-Malinka in Parashkev Hadjiev's fairy-tale opera The Golden Apple. During the 1976–77 season she began performing in Western Europe, guesting at the opera houses of Mainz and Bremen as Desdemona in Otello and Micaela in Carmen, and singing the soprano solo in Verdi's Requiem. She married an Austrian and became known professionally as Marina Mader-Todorova, subsequently acquiring Austrian citizenship.

From 1977 to 1980 she was engaged by the Musiktheater im Revier in Gelsenkirchen, where her first roles included Elisabeth in Don Carlos, later the title role in Ariadne auf Naxos and Tosca. During this engagement she took part in the gala concert marking the 25th anniversary of the Musiktheater im Revier, performing alongside Jan Hendrik Rootering, Ana Riera, Karoly Szilagyi and Salvatore Fisichella, under the musical direction of Manfred Mayrhofer.

Between 1980 and 1983 she served as the first young dramatic soprano at the opera house in Dortmund. In Dortmund she appeared in the title role of Arabella by Richard Strauss, making her role debut in that part; she also performed in Frankfurt, Stuttgart and as a member of the Deutsche Oper am Rhein. In the 1982–83 season she sang Elsa in Wagner's Lohengrin at the Dortmund opera, praised prominently in multiple press reviews as the outstanding performer of the evening.

From 1984, Todorova was a regular guest at the Vienna State Opera, where she first appeared as Leonora in Verdi's Il trovatore, on one occasion stepping in at short notice for the indisposed Gwyneth Jones. Later roles at the Vienna State Opera included Eva in Die Meistersinger von Nürnberg (1985–86), Amelia in Un ballo in maschera, Agathe in Der Freischütz, Ariadne in Ariadne auf Naxos, Cio-Cio-San in Madama Butterfly, Elisabeth in Tannhäuser, Elsa in Lohengrin, the Countess in The Marriage of Figaro, Fiordiligi in Così fan tutte, Arabella in Arabella and Mimì in La bohème.

Her guest engagements included appearances at the state operas of Hamburg (1980–81) and Stuttgart (1981–83), Frankfurt Opera, the Deutsche Oper am Rhein in Düsseldorf (1984–86), and the theatres of Basel (1983–84) and Graz (1984–89). Further guest appearances took place at opera houses in Berlin, Budapest (Nationaloper, 1980–83), Wiesbaden, Hanover, Saarbrücken, Mannheim, Palermo (Teatro Massimo), Zürich, Ghent, Copenhagen and Liège (Opéra de Wallonie).

== Concert and oratorio work ==
Todorova specialised in song and oratorio as well as opera, and worked as an oratorio soloist in radio recordings in Vienna, Zürich and Frankfurt a.M. On 7 May 1981 she sang the soprano part in Verdi's Requiem with the Philharmonischer Chor Trier, the Trierer Domchor and the Trierer Bachchor at the Konstantin-Basilika in Trier. On 19 October 1986 she was the soprano soloist in Beethoven's Symphony No. 9 in the Great Hall of the Vienna Musikverein with the Niederösterreichisches Tonkünstler-Orchester and the Wiener Singakademie.

In North America she appeared with the Buffalo Philharmonic Orchestra and the Buffalo Schola Cantorum; on 13 and 16 March 1982 she sang the soprano role in concert performances of Verdi's Otello at the Kleinhans Music Hall in Buffalo conducted by Julius Rudel.

== Personal life ==
Todorova married an Austrian citizen in the 1970s, subsequently acquired Austrian citizenship and uses the hyphenated surname Mader-Todorova professionally.
