= Kiril Manolov =

Kiril Manolov Кирил Манолов
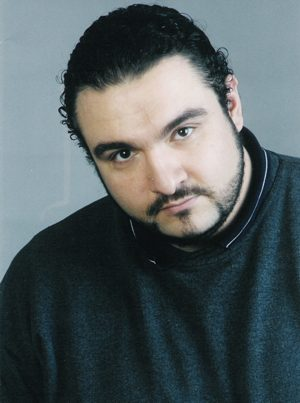

Background information
- Born: Kiril Manolov Todorov; Sofia, Bulgaria
- Occupation: Opera singer (baritone)
- Years active: 1998 – present

Kiril Manolov (Bulgarian: Кирил Манолов) is a Bulgarian operatic baritone with an international career performing leading roles in the opera houses and opera festivals in Europe, US and Japan.

He is known for his portrayal of the title role in Verdi's Falstaff but he also is great Nabucco-"Nabucco", Simon-"Simon Boccanegra", Amonasro-"Aida", Rigoletto-"Rigoletto", Don Carlos di Vargas-"La forza del destino".

== Life and career ==
Born Kiril Manolov Todorov in Sofia, he was educated at the Bulgarian State Academy of Music and made his debut in 1998 as Don Giovanni in Don Giovanni. He did further vocal study in Milan and in Vienna.

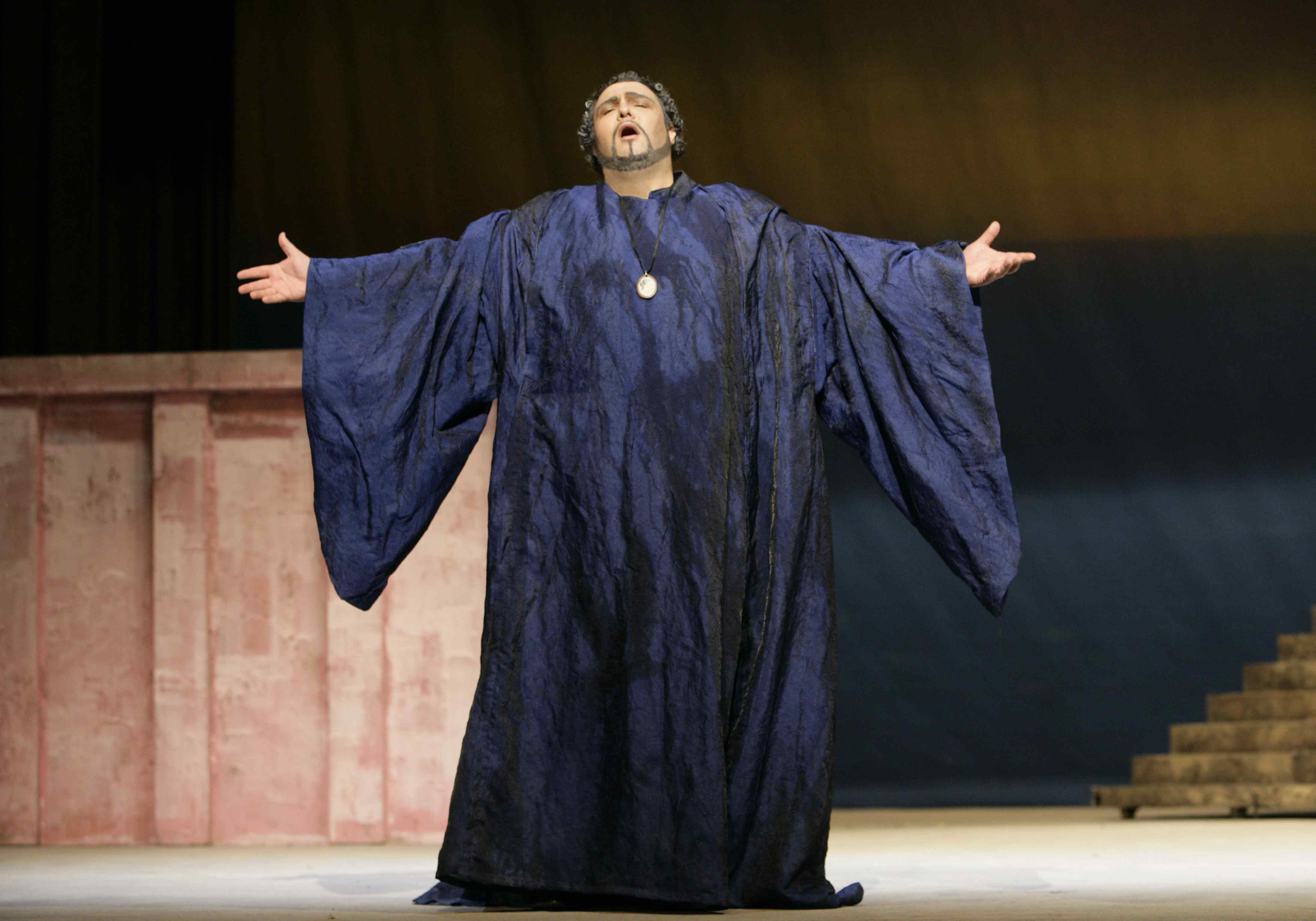
Manolov in the title role of Simon Boccanegra at the Croatian National Theatre in Split, 2007

Manolov sang as a soloist for the National Opera and Ballet of Bulgaria for several years and went on to become a regular guest soloist at the Croatian National Theatres in Zagreb and Split. He has since returned several times to the National Opera in Sofia, including performances as Amonasro in Aida (2012) and the title role in Nabucco (2011). Since 2010 he has been a regular soloist at the Hessisches Staatstheater Wiesbaden, appearing as Miller in Luisa Miller and in the title roles of Il barbiere di Siviglia, Simon Boccanegra, Falstaff and Don Pasquale amongst others.

Sir John Falstaff in Verdi's Falstaff has been one of Manolov's signature roles. He sang the role for his house debuts at the Hamburg Staatsoper (2010), the Hungarian State Opera (2013), and the Deutsche Oper Berlin (2014). It was also the role in which he made his Italian debut at the Ravenna Festival in 2013. The Ravenna production with Manolov as Falstaff, subsequently toured to Ferrara and other Italian cities and was revived at Ravenna in July 2015, conducted by Riccardo Muti, who brought the production and singers to Spain for performances at Oviedo's Teatro Campoamor later that month.

In 2016 Manolov sang Michele in Il tabarro and the title role in Gianni Schicchi in Puccini's Il trittico at the Teatro dell'Opera di Roma, conducted by Daniele Rustioni. He also appeared as Amonasro in Aida at Opéra de Montréal, conducted by Paul Nadler. In 2017 he sang the title role in Rigoletto at the Savonlinna Opera Festival, conducted by Philippe Auguin, and also the role of Simon Boccanegra in the productions of Verdi's Simon Boccanegra at Opera Ballet Vlaanderen and in Piacenza/Ravenna. In 2018 he sang his signature role Falstaff at the Teatro de la Maestranza in Seville, conducted by Pedro Halffter, and in 2019 he appeared as Count di Luna in Il trovatore at the Sofia Opera, conducted by Laurent Campellone. In 2020 he sang the title role in the new production of Macbeth at the Varna Summer International Music Festival, conducted by Nayden Todorov and with Alexandrina Pendatchanska as Lady Macbeth. In 2023 he performed again Macbeth on a tour with Pfalztheater Kaiserslautern in Germany. His Verdi-focused album Tutto Verdi, with the Bulgarian National Radio Symphony Orchestra conducted by Pavel Baleff, was released in 2025.

== Awards ==
Manolov's awards include:

- 2006 - First Prize, in the 1st Ghena Dimitrova National Competition for Young Singers. The competition was founded in Dimitrova's honour following her death in 2005.
- 2009 - Gold Medal and "Gold Ring of Sofia" in the 14th Boris Christoff International Competition For Young Opera Singers. The "Gold Ring of Sofia" is the Grand Prix of the competition and is awarded to only a few singers. Manolov was the first singer to have received the award since 1992.
