= Breze Peak =

Peak on Alexander Island, Antarctica

Location of Alexander Island in the Antarctic Peninsula region

Satellite image of Alexander Island

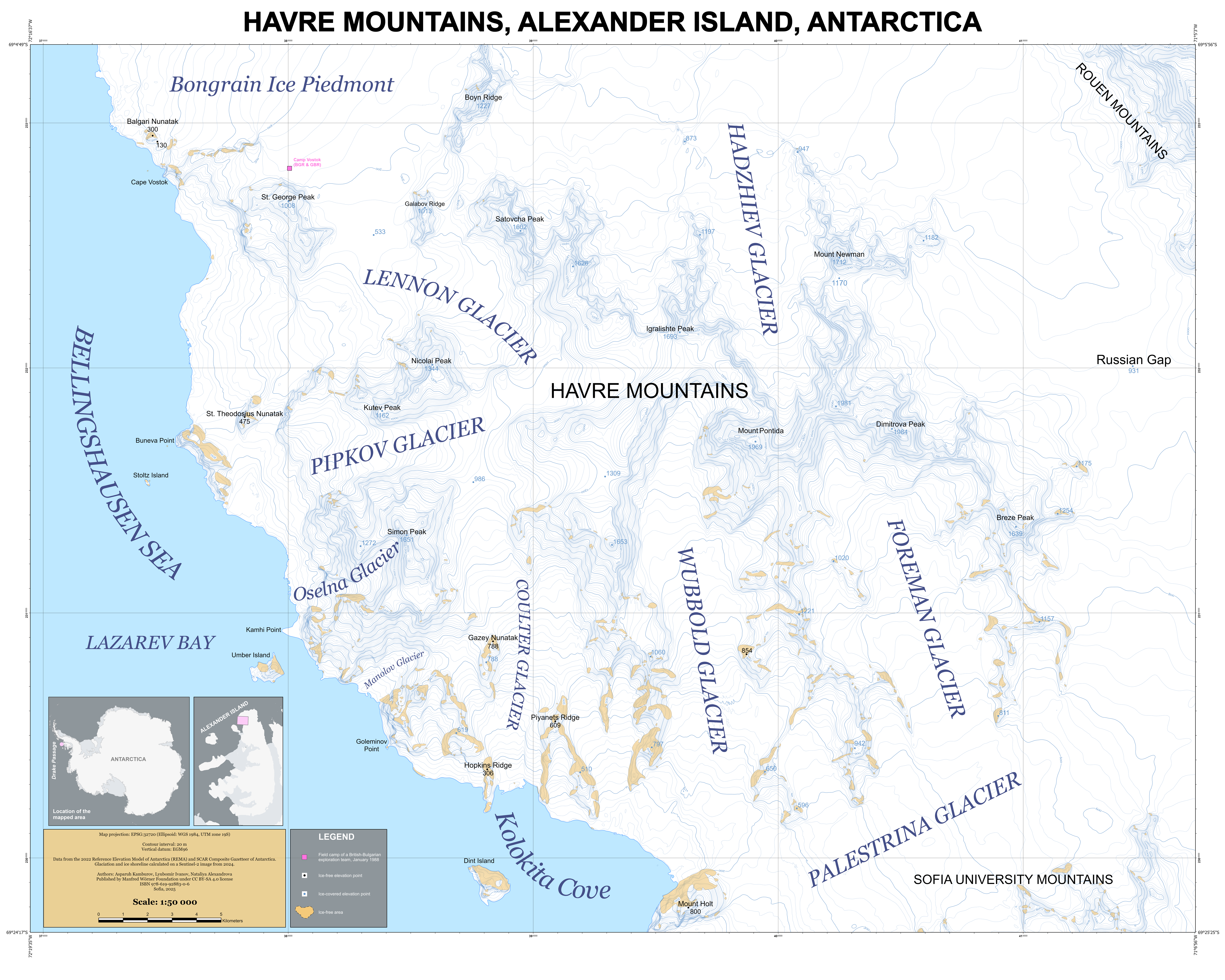
Map of Havre Mountains, Alexander Island in Antarctica

Breze Peak (Bulgarian: връх Брезе, romanized: vrah Breze, IPA: [ˈvrɤɣ ˈbrɛzɛ]) is the mostly ice-covered peak rising to 1634 m in eastern Havre Mountains, northern Alexander Island in Antarctica. It surmounts Russian Gap to the northeast and Foreman Glacier to the west. The peak was visited on 8 January 1988 by the geological survey team of Christo Pimpirev and Borislav Kamenov (First Bulgarian Antarctic Expedition), and Philip Nell and Peter Marquis (British Antarctic Survey).

The feature is named after the settlements of Breze in Southern and Western Bulgaria.

== Location ==
The peak is located at 69°16′30″S 71°17′00″W, which is 11.2 km southeast of Mount Pontida, 13.15 km south-southeast of Mount Newman, 22.5 km west of Mount Sanderson in Rouen Mountains, and 17.37 km north-northwest of the central height of Landers Peaks in Sofia University Mountains.

== Maps ==
- British Antarctic Territory. Scale 1:200000 topographic map. DOS 610 – W 69 70. Tolworth, UK, 1971
- Antarctic Digital Database (ADD). Scale 1:250000 topographic map of Antarctica. Scientific Committee on Antarctic Research (SCAR). Since 1993, regularly upgraded and updated
