= Piyanets Ridge =

Ridge in Antarctica

Location of Alexander Island in the Antarctic Peninsula region

Satellite image of Alexander Island

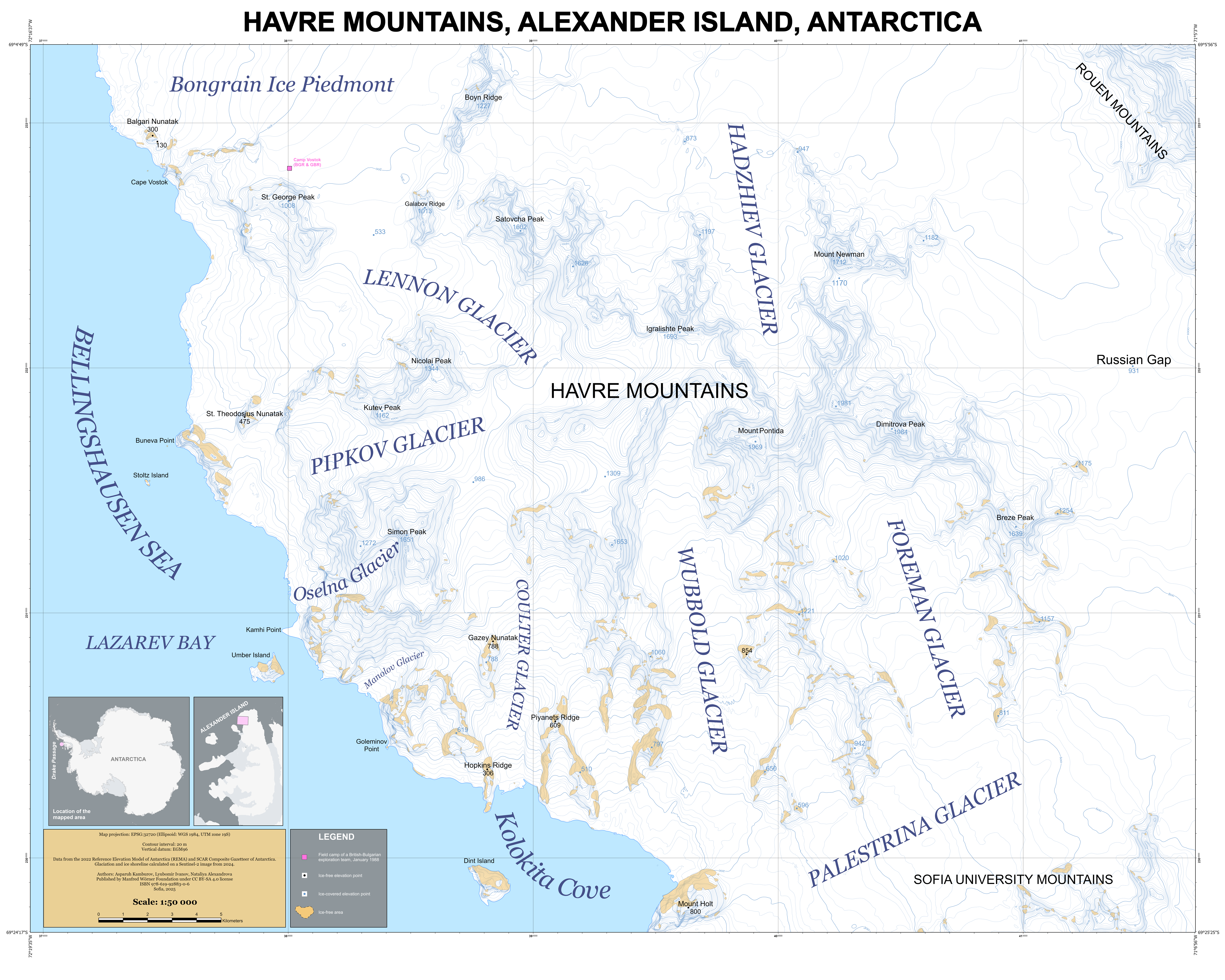
Map of Havre Mountains, Alexander Island in Antarctica

Piyanets Ridge (Bulgarian: рид Пиянец, ‘Rid Piyanets’ \'rid pi-ya-'nets\) is the upturned V-shaped, mostly ice-free ridge extending 5.6 km in north-south direction, 2.4 km wide and rising to 590 m in Havre Mountains, northern Alexander Island in Antarctica. It surmounts Kolokita Cove to the southwest. The feature is named after the region of Piyanets in Western Bulgaria.

== Location ==
Piyanets Ridge is located at 69°20′24″S 71°46′20″W, which is 4.55 km northeast of the coastal point formed by Hopkins Ridge, 3.77 km southeast of Gazey Nunatak and 9.2 km northwest of Mount Holt.

== Maps ==
- British Antarctic Territory. Scale 1:200000 topographic map. DOS 610 – W 69 70. Tolworth, UK, 1971
- Antarctic Digital Database (ADD). Scale 1:250000 topographic map of Antarctica. Scientific Committee on Antarctic Research (SCAR). Since 1993, regularly upgraded and updated
