= Victor Chuchkov =

Bulgarian composer and pianist

Victor Chuchkov (Cyrillic:Виктор Чучков) (born 25 February 1946 in Gorna Oryahovitsa) is a Bulgarian composer and pianist. He graduated piano and composition from the Bulgarian State Conservatoire and has also studied at the Accademia Nazionale di Santa Cecilia in Rome. As a pianist, he has received international prizes like the Alfredo Casella Prize and Alessandro Casagrande Prize, both in Italy. As a composer, he is the author of "Letters from the Future" (after Ray Bradbury - for voice, rock band and symphony orchestra), concerto for piano and orchestra, piano trio and others.
