= Parashkev Hadjiev =

- Born: 27 April 1912; Sofia, Bulgaria
- Died: 28 April 1992 (aged 80) Sofia, Bulgaria

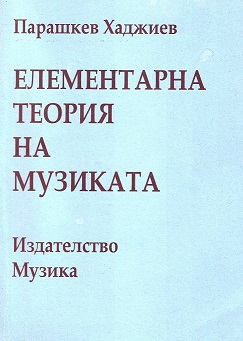

Parashkev Hadjiev (Bulgarian: Парашкев Хаджиев; born in Sofia, Bulgaria, 27 April 1912 – 1992) was a Bulgarian composer. He was the son of conductor Todor Hadjiev, an early champion of Bulgarian opera. Some view Parashkev Hadjiev as perhaps the most important post-war composer in Bulgaria. He taught at the Bulgarian State Conservatory where one of his pupils was composer Tsvetan Tsvetanov.

== Works ==
=== Operas ===
- Once Upon a Time (1957)
- A Madcap (1959) – Libretto Ivan Genov
- Albena (1962) – libretto Peter Filchev (after the drama of Yordan Yovkov)
- Aika (1963) https://www.youtube.com/watch?v=MSv5VWjdc4U
- July Night (1964) – after the drama of Ivan Genov Early ballad
- Millionaire (1965) – a comedy Yordan Yovkov
- Masters (1966) – a drama of R. Stoyanov
- Golden Apple – (1972)
- Leto 893 (1973) – Libretto Pancho Panchev
- Maria Desislava (1978) – Libretto Kamen Zidarov
- Ioannis Rex (1981) – Libretto Радко Радков / Radko Radkov
- Paradoxes three one-act operas: Divorce, Thief and Gifts (1982)
- I, Claudius (1984)
- Star without name (1985) – Libretto Ognyan Stamboliev
- Malingerer (1987)
- Babinata bread (1989)
- Inspector (1990)
- John Kukuzel Love (1992)

=== Operetta ===
- Divided (1952)
- Icahn (1955 d)
- Madame Sans Gene (1958 d)

=== Film music ===
- Marriage, directed by Borozanov B. (1942)
- Fire trail, directed by B. Borozanov, At. Georgiev (1946)
- Kalin eagle, directed by Borozanov B. (1950)
- Traces remain, directed by Peter Vasilev (1956)
- Little, directed by N. Korabov (1958)

== Recordings ==
- Songs of Parashkev Hadjiev (Песните на Парашкев Хаджиев) Ludmila Hadjieva. CD 0717-2 2006.
- On Slavic Arias by Krassimira Stoyanova – aria from Maria Desislava, opera: Scene 4. Velíki bózhe, chuy móyata molbá!

== Honours ==
Hadzhiev Glacier in Antarctica is named after Parashkev Hadzhiev.
