= Igralishte =

- Village
- Location within Bulgaria
- Coordinates: 41°34′N 23°08′E
- Country: Bulgaria
- Province: Blagoevgrad Province
- Municipality: Strumyani Municipality
- Elevation: 819 m (2,687 ft)

Population (2010)
  - Total: 336
- Time zone: UTC+2 (EET)
  - Summer (DST): UTC+3 (EEST)
- Postal code: 2848
- Area code: (+359) 74348
- Vehicle registration: E

Igralishte is a village in Strumyani Municipality, in Blagoevgrad Province, in southwestern Bulgaria.

Igralishte Peak in Antarctica is named after the village.
