= Girma Yifrashewa =

Ethiopian classical pianist (born 1967)

- Born: 1967 (age 58–59); Addis Ababa, Ethiopia
- Years active: 2001–present
- Label: Unseen Worlds
- Website: girmayifrashewa.com

Girma Yifrashewa (born 1967) is an Ethiopian classical pianist and composer. He is director of the Ashenafi Kebede Performing Arts Centre of the Addis Ababa University.

== Early life and education ==
Girma Yifrashewa was born in Addis Ababa in 1967. In his childhood he played the krar, a traditional harp from Ethiopia. At the age of sixteen Yifrashewa entered the Yared School of Music, where he began to learn piano. In 1986 he began studying at the Bulgarian State Conservatory. He lost his scholarship in 1989 when the Bulgarian Communist Party lost power following the revolutions of 1989. Girma spent two years in Italy and returned to the Conservatory in 1991 to finish his studies, funded by the Irish Christian Brothers.

== Career ==
He gave his first public concert at the Italian institute in Addis Ababa in 2001. His debut album The Shepherd with the Flute was released in 2001, followed by Meleya Keleme (2003) with Michael Belayneh, and Elilta (2006). Girma's fourth album Love & Peace was released by US record label Unseen Worlds in 2014, and comprises five solo piano pieces, including an homage to a melody written by Ashenafi Kebede, as well as traditional Ethiopian hymns and wedding songs. Reviews of Love & Peace compared Yifrashewa's playing to pianists Scott Joplin and George Winston. The album reached number 23 on the Billboard classical albums chart.

In January 2020 he gave the first ever grand piano concert in Ethiopia, at the Ethiopian Skylight Hotel. He has performed concerts across the world, including at Carnegie Hall and the Issue Project Room in New York.

== Discography ==
=== Albums ===
- The Shepherd with the Flute (2001)
- Meleya Keleme (2003), with Michael Belayneh
- Elilta (2006)
- Love & Peace (Unseen Worlds, 2014)
- My Strong Will (Unseen Worlds, 2023)
