= Ghena Dimitrova =

Bulgarian operatic soprano (1941–2005)

- Гена Димитрова
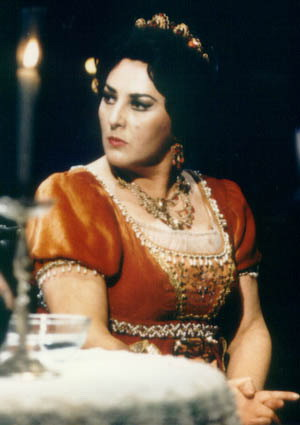
- Born: 6 May 1941; Pleven, Kingdom of Bulgaria
- Died: 11 June 2005 (aged 64); Milan, Italy
- Resting place: Central Sofia Cemetery; 42°42′41.4″N 023°20′05.8″E
- Education: Bulgarian State Conservatoire
- Occupation: Opera singer (soprano)
- Spouse: Gheorghi Stojkov (m. 1967; died 1991)

Ghena Dimitrova (Bulgarian: Гена Димитрова, 6 May 1941 – 11 June 2005) was a Bulgarian operatic soprano. Her voice was known for its power and upper extension, which she used to great effect in operatic roles such as Puccini's Turandot in a career spanning four decades.

== Early career ==
Ghena Dimitrova was born in the Bulgarian village of Beglezh, some 25 km from Pleven, in 1941. She started singing in the school choir and her powerful voice led to her being offered a place at the Sofia Conservatory studying under Christo Brambarov between 1959 and 1964. While she was initially classified as a mezzo-soprano, she was recognised as a soprano in her second year.

After finishing her studies at the Bulgarian State Conservatory, she started teaching singing. Her breakthrough came in 1967 as Abigaille in a Bulgarian National Opera production of Giuseppe Verdi's Nabucco after a couple of other sopranos dropped out. In the early recordings Dimitrova's voice had not yet reached its signature size, and in many of the early Nabucco productions, the final optional high C is omitted in the cabaletta, Salgo già, which she would include later in her career.

== International career ==
Dimitrova won the Sofia International Singing Competition in 1970, the prize including a course of study at La Scala's Scuola di Perfezionamento.

She made her Italian debut as Turandot in Treviso in 1975, and essayed the same role for her 1983 La Scala debut opposite tenor Plácido Domingo in Franco Zeffirelli's lavish production. She also sang at the Teatro Colón in Buenos Aires in 1974–75, where she sang Tosca, Turandot, Andrea Chénier, Il trovatore and Don Carlo. Her Turandot is also preserved in a video of the Arena di Verona production from 1983, with Nicola Martinucci and Cecilia Gasdia. In 1987, she made her debut at the Metropolitan Opera in New York performing the same role.

Dimitrova once said of the role: "Turandot may not be my favorite part, but it shows off the voice to great advantage. The way the music is written, you need a voice like a trumpet to do it justice."

Her debut in the United States was in 1981 performing the role of Elvira in Ernani. She sang at the Barbican Arts Centre in Ponchielli's La Gioconda in 1983 before making her Covent Garden debut in the same year. Her late debut she later attributed simply to "politics".

Dimitrova also sang some mezzo-soprano roles in her repertory. The most notable of these were Amneris, which she did at La Scala's 1985 staging of Verdi's Aida opposite Maria Chiara in the title role and Luciano Pavarotti as Radames; and Eboli from Verdi's Don Carlo.

During her international career Dimitrova worked with conductors including Riccardo Muti, Giuseppe Sinopoli, Lorin Maazel, Maurizio Arena, Lamberto Gardelli, Charles Mackerras, Daniel Oren, Nello Santi and Christian Badea. In Bulgaria, she also worked with conductors from her native country, including Ruslan Raychev, Boris Hinchev, Mihail Angelov and Nayden Todorov.

After retiring from the stage in 2001, Dimitrova remained active working with young singers. One of her students is the soprano Elena Baramova.

Dimitrova died of cancer in Milan on 11 June 2005. After her death the Bulgarian Government promised to establish a fund in her name for promising young singers.

== Honours ==
Dimitrova Peak, the summit of Havre Mountains in Antarctica, is named after Ghena Dimitrova.

== Videography ==
- James Levine's 25th Anniversary Metropolitan Opera Gala (1996), Deutsche Grammophon DVD, B0004602-09
- Giuseppe Verdi: I Lombardi alla prima crociata (Teatro alla Scala, 1984), Warner Music Vision DVD, 0927-44927-2
- Giuseppe Verdi: Nabucco (Teatro alla Scala, 1987), Warner Music Vision DVD, 5050467-0944-2-0
- Giuseppe Verdi: Aida (Teatro alla Scala, 1986), ArtHaus Music BR/DVD, 109087

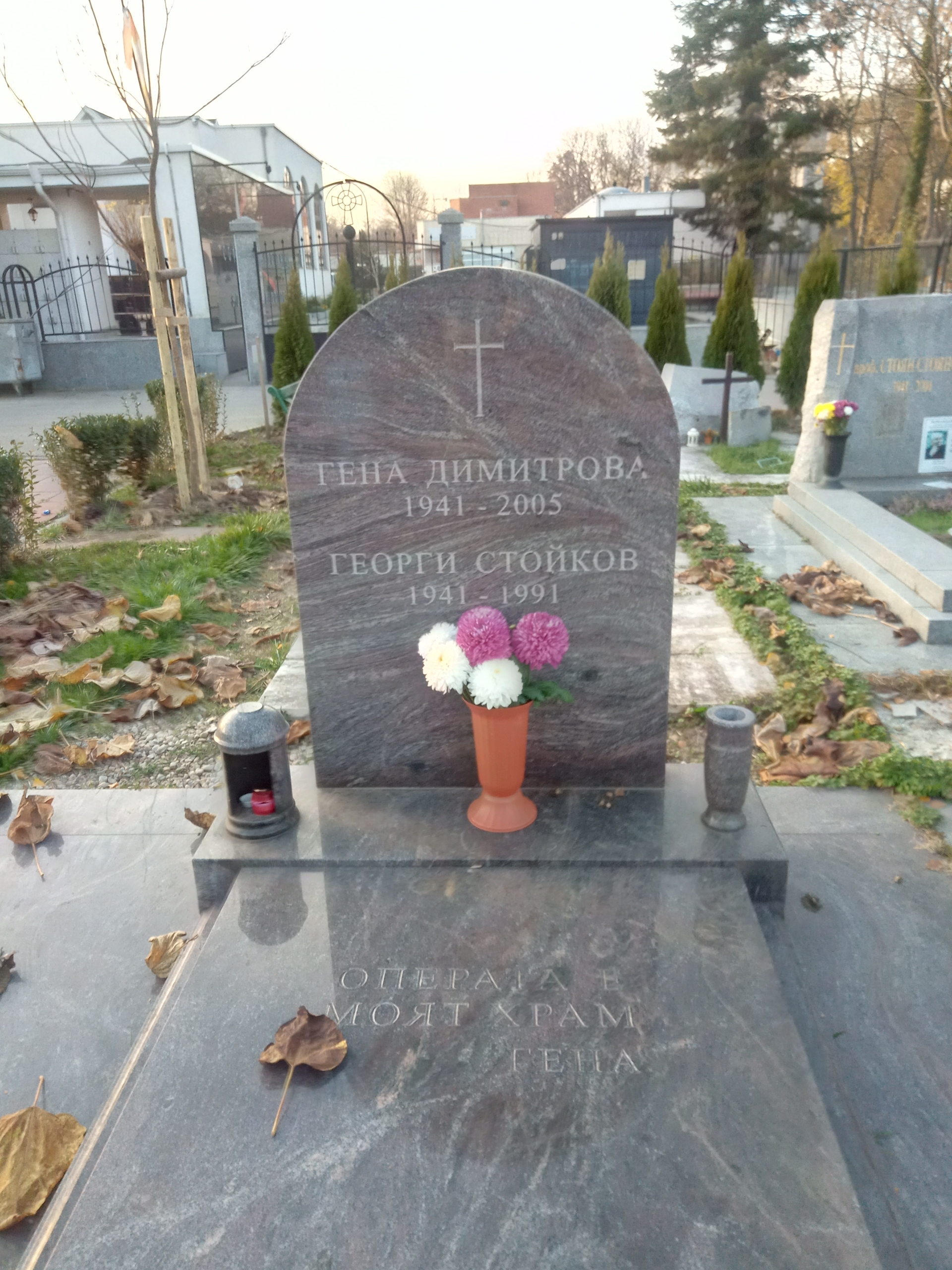
The grave of Ghena Dimitrova and her husband in Central Sofia Cemetery (42°42′41.4″N 023°20′05.8″E)
