= Croatian National Theatre, Split =

Theatre in Split, Croatia

Coordinates: 43°30′39″N 16°26′17″E

Croatian National Theatre in Split
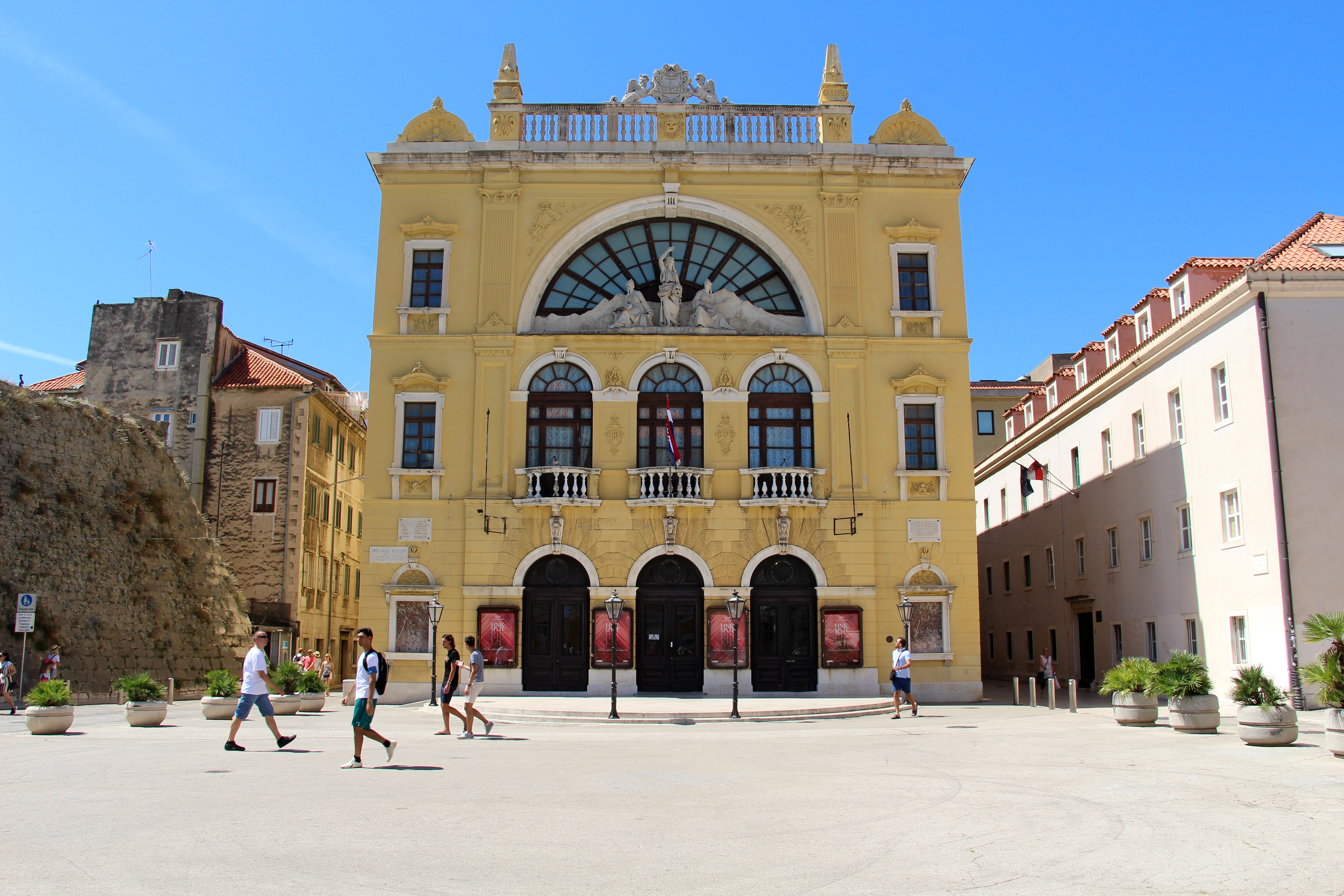
- Croatian National Theatre building in Split
- Interactive map of Croatian National Theatre in Split
- Address: 1 Gaje Bulata Square; Split; Croatia
- Owner: City of Split
- Type: National, opera house

Construction
- Opened: 6 May 1893
- Rebuilt: 1970-1980
- Architects: Emil Vecchietti; Ante Bezić

Website
- www.hnk-split.hr

The Croatian National Theatre in Split (Croatian: Hrvatsko narodno kazalište u Splitu or HNK Split) is a theatre located in Split, Croatia. Originally opened in 1893, the theatre is owned and operated by the City of Split and is one of the oldest surviving theatres in Dalmatia.

== History ==
The theatre building was originally constructed as the Split Municipal Theatre in 1893 during the tenure of then mayor Gajo Bulat. The building was designed by local architects Emilio Vecchietti and Ante Bezić while the interior decoration was done by Eugenio Scomparini, Napoleone Cozzi and Josip Varvodić. The theatre, which had a capacity of 1,000 (at a time when Split had a population of 16,000) was the biggest theatre in Southeast Europe at the time of its completion. The building was initially used to stage performances by traveling troupes (mostly Italian), as there was no full-time drama ensemble in the city of Split by the very end of the 19th century.

The first professional theatre troupe appeared in 1920, when the building underwent its first renovation and when the theatre was renamed "Dalmatian National Theatre". In 1928 during the Kingdom of Yugoslavia the theatre was merged with the Sarajevo National Theatre and renamed "National Theatre for Western Regions" (Narodno pozorište za zapadne oblasti). That same year the professional actors' ensemble was disbanded by the authorities. However, a group of artists led by Ivo Tijardović, formed the Split Theatre Society which continued to perform operas and operettas into the 1930s.

In 1940 the theatre experienced a brief period of revival, adopting its current name and for the first time housing opera, drama and ballet ensembles. The first intendant of the theatre was Tijardović, the drama section was led by Marko Fotez, while opera and ballet sections were headed by Oskar Jozefović and Ana Roje. However, the revival proved to be short-lived as the theatre was closed again in 1941 due to Italian occupation during World War II when portions of southern Croatia were incorporated into the wartime Governorship of Dalmatia. Following the end of World War II the theatre was re-established on 1 July 1945 and its first season opened in September 1945 with a performance of a play by Croatian author Mirko Bogović.

The theatre has been operating ever since. However, in February 1970 the building was nearly completely destroyed in a fire. During the following decade the house ensembles performed plays at other venues in Split until the newly rebuilt theatre opened its doors again in May 1980.

== Present day ==
HNK Split hosts around 300 performances every year, attended by a total audience of around 120,000. Some 20 to 40 opera, ballet and dramatic productions are staged per year in addition to many symphony concerts performed by the in-house orchestra. The theatre is billed as the "premier theatre house in Dalmatia" and "one of the biggest and oldest theatre houses in the Mediterranean".

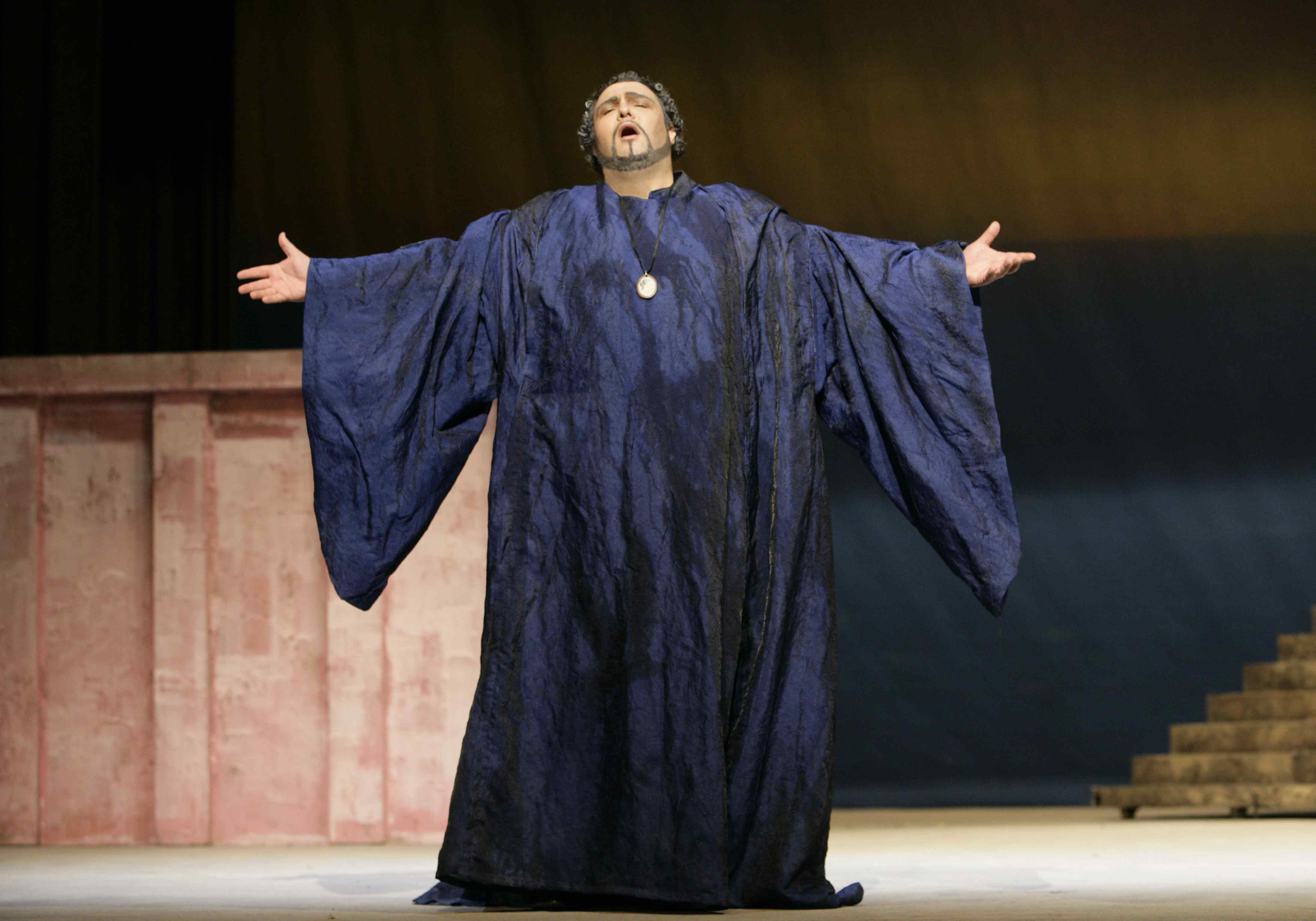
Kiril Manolov in the title role of Simon Boccanegra, Croatian National Theatre in Split, 2007

== Festivals ==
Apart from its regular program HNK Split also organizes two long-running annual festivals:

=== Splitsko ljeto ===
Split Summer Festival (Splitsko ljeto) established in 1954, the second oldest festival of performing arts in the country (after the Dubrovnik Summer Festival). The festival is usually held over a 30-day period between mid-July and mid-August and includes a great number of various events like open-air jazz and classical concerts, art exhibitions, theatre plays staged in public squares and modern dance performances. Parts of the program are usually held at historic venues such as the Diocletian's Palace.

Among the performers there were renowned conductors Kurt Adler, Mladen Bašić, Anton Guadagno, Ernst Märzendorfer, Lovro von Matačić, Boris Papandopulo, Vjekoslav Šutej, as well as famous singers like Martina Arroyo, Radmila Bakočević, Fiorenza Cedolins, Michèle Crider, Biserka Cvejić, Bonaldo Giaiotti, James McCracken, Zinka Milanov, Hasmik Papian, Enzo Sordello, Eleanor Steber, Lucilla Udovich, Ivo Vinco etc.

=== Marulićevi dani ===
Days of Marulić (Marulićevi dani) were established in 1991 on the 490th anniversary of the publication of Judita, one of the most important Croatian works of literature written by 15th-century author Marko Marulić. The week-long festival held in April showcases best achievements in Croatian playwriting in the preceding year. The main award at the festival, sponsored by the Ministry of Culture is the Marin Držić Award, given to the author of the best play written that year.
