= Edwards Gap =

Edwards Gap (71°15′S 70°20′W) is a pass at about 500 metres (1,600 ft) through the Walton Mountains, southward of Mount McArthur, on Alexander Island, Antarctica. It was named by the UK Antarctic Place-Names Committee for Christopher W. Edwards, a British Antarctic Survey geologist at Stonington Island, 1973–75, who mapped this area.

== See also ==
- Russian Gap
- Snick Pass
- Whistle Pass
