= Tsvetan Tsvetanov (composer) =

Tsvetan Tsvetanov (6 November 1931 – 4 April 1982) was a Bulgarian composer and music educator. His compositional style blended Western classical music idioms with Bulgarian folk music. He authored the music theory textbook Zadachi po kharmoniya (1973; English: Exercises in harmony).

== Life and career ==
Born in Sofia, Tsvetanov studied music composition in his native city at the Bulgarian State Conservatory (BSC, later re-named National Academy of Music) with Parashkev Hadjiev and Pancho Vladigerov. He also trained as a violinist at the BSC under Vladimir Avramov. After graduating from that institution in 1956, he worked as a music editor at the Central Military Club from 1956 to 1958.

Tsvetanov joined the faculty of the BSC as a teacher of harmony in 1956. He was appointed lecturer at the BSC in 1970 and then made a professor in 1975. From 1966 to 1969 he served as secretary of the Union of Bulgarian Composers. He died in Sofia in 1982.

His compositional output included four symphonies, two ballets, film scores, oratorios, concerti, chamber music, art songs, choral music, and works for solo instrument. He had success with his cantata Stalbata (1966, English: The Ladder) for alto soloist, male chorus, and orchestra.
