= Wubbold Glacier =

Glacier in Antarctica

Coordinates: 69°20′S 71°35′W

Location of Alexander Island in the Antarctic Peninsula region

Satellite image of Alexander Island

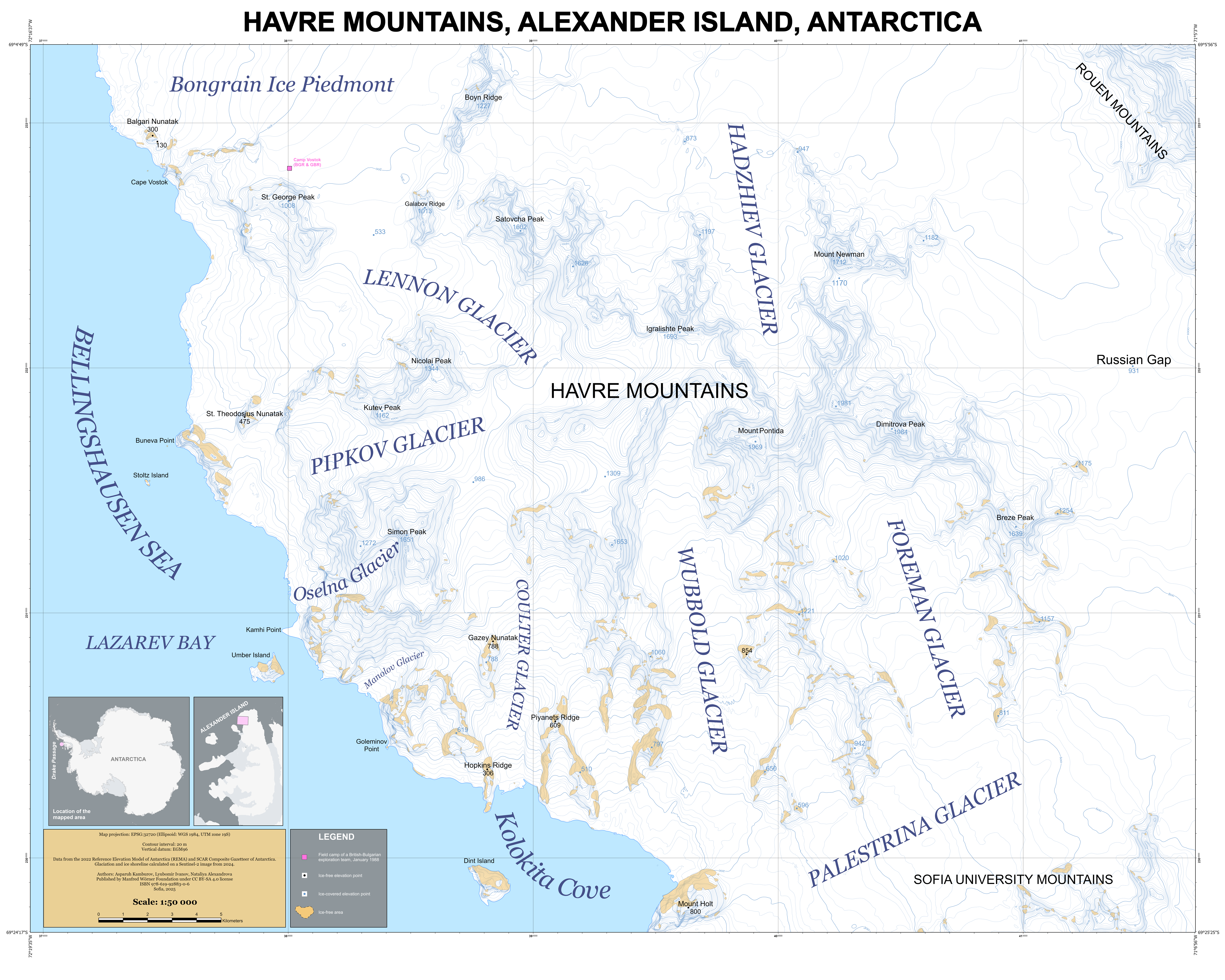
Map of Havre Mountains, Alexander Island in Antarctica

Wubbold Glacier is a steeply inclined glacier, 8 nautical miles (15 km) long, flowing south from the Havre Mountains, situated in the northern portion of Alexander Island, Antarctica. The glacier drains the north, west and southwest slopes of Mount Pontida, and flows into Lazarev Bay north of Mount Holt. It was photographed from the air by Ronne Antarctic Research Expedition in 1947 and was mapped from the photographs by Falkland Islands Dependencies Survey in 1960. Named by Advisory Committee on Antarctic Names for Commander J.H. Wubbold, USCG, commanding officer, USCGC Northwind, U.S. Navy Operation Deepfreeze, 1977.

== See also ==
- Lennon Glacier
- Palestrina Glacier
- Transition Glacier
