= Boyn Ridge =

Mountain ridge in Antarctica

Location of Alexander Island in the Antarctic Peninsula region

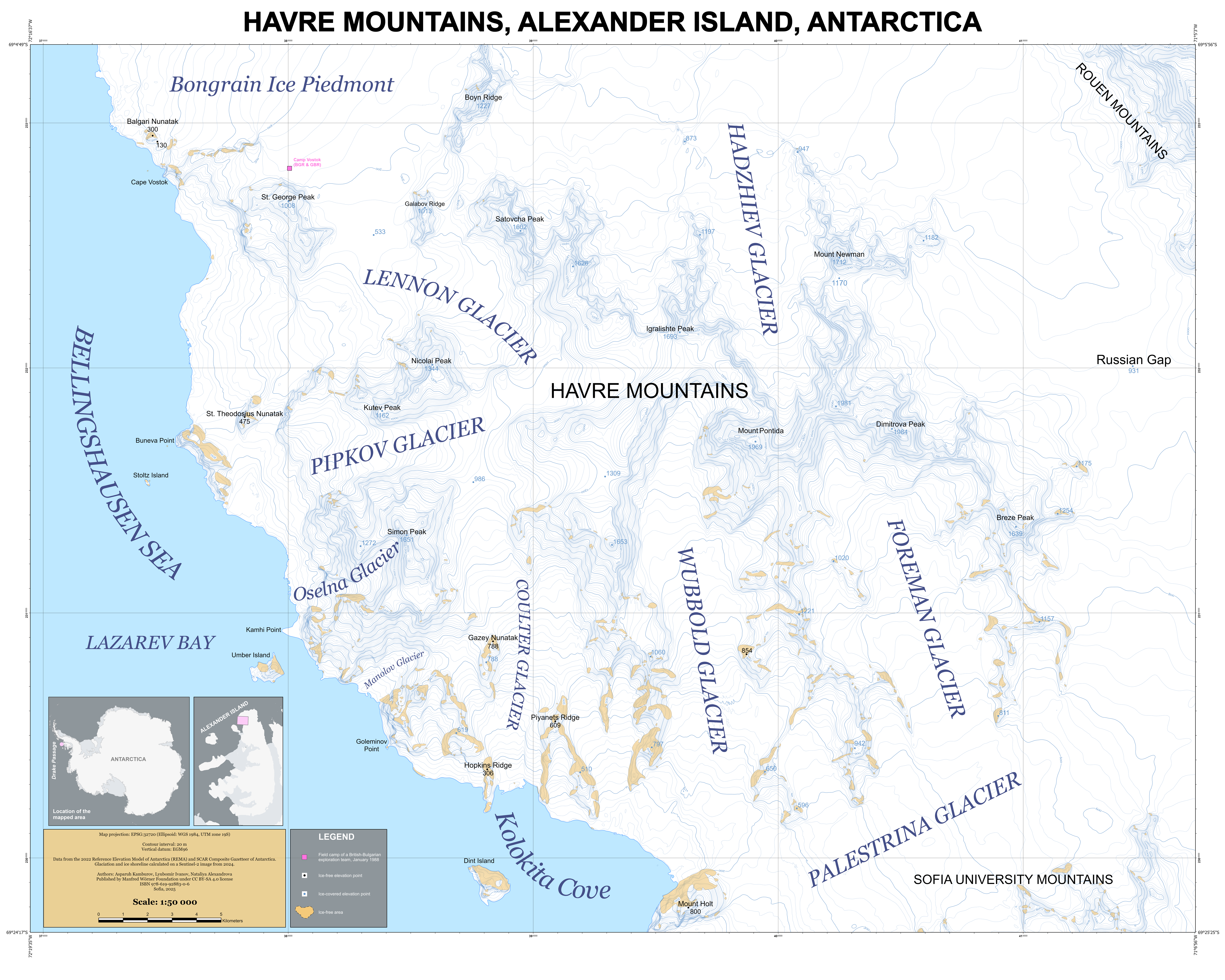
Map of Havre Mountains, Alexander Island in Antarctica

Boyn Ridge (69°7′S 71°48′W) is the northernmost ridge of the Havre Mountains, north Alexander Island, Antarctica. Situated 5.6 km north-northwest of Satovcha Peak. Following geological work by the British Antarctic Survey, 1976–77, it was named by the UK Antarctic Place-Names Committee in 1980 after Charles Boyn, Director, Agence General Maritime, France, who superintended the building of the expedition ship Pourquoi-Pas? of the French Antarctic Expedition, 1908–10.
