= Kolokita Cove =

Location of Alexander Island in the Antarctic Peninsula region

Satellite image of Alexander Island

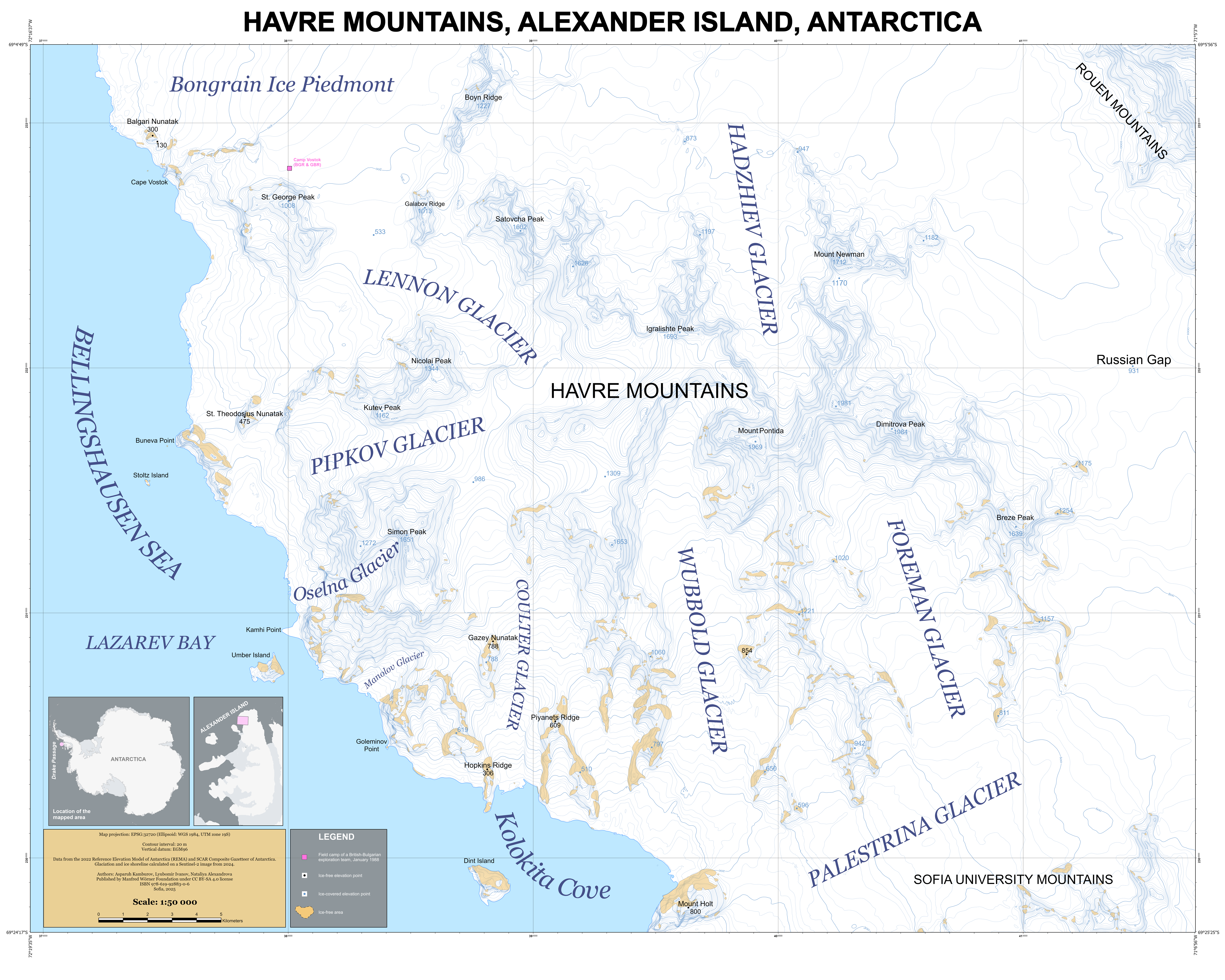
Map of Havre Mountains, Alexander Island in Antarctica

Kolokita Cove (Bulgarian: залив Колокита, ‘Zaliv Kolokita’ \'za-liv ko-lo-'ki-ta\) is the 2.7 km wide embayment indenting for 1.55 km the northwest coast of Alexander Island in Antarctica. It is entered east of the coastal point formed by Hopkins Ridge and west of Piyanets Ridge, and has its head fed by Coulter Glacier. The feature is named after Kolokita Point on the Bulgarian Black Sea Coast.

== Location ==
Kolokita Cove is centered at 69°21′50″S 71°49′00″W.

== Maps ==
- British Antarctic Territory. Scale 1:200000 topographic map. DOS 610 – W 69 70. Tolworth, UK, 1971
- Antarctic Digital Database (ADD). Scale 1:250000 topographic map of Antarctica. Scientific Committee on Antarctic Research (SCAR). Since 1993, regularly upgraded and updated
