= Krassimira Stoyanova =

Bulgarian soprano (born 1962)

Krassimira Stoyanova (Bulgarian: Красимира Стоянова; born 16 August 1962) is a Bulgarian soprano.

Born in Veliko Tarnovo, she studied violin at the Conservatory and singing and violin at the Plovdiv Music Academy. She made her professional debut in 1995 at the Sofia National Opera, where she debuted a wide range of roles. Since 1998 has a close relationship with the Vienna State Opera where she has sung Rachel, Le nozze di Figaro, Micaëla, Antonia, Liù, Nedda, Mimì, Violetta, Alice, Rusalka, Desdemona, Elisabetta, Ariadne auf Naxos, Amelia, Anna Bolena, to mention only a few. She is particularly well known for the title role in La Juive. She was awarded the Austrian title of Kammersängerin in 2009.

She sings regularly at New York's Metropolitan Opera House, Teatro Colón, Deutsche Oper Berlin, San Diego, Chicago, the Liceu in Barcelona, Royal Opera House Covent Garden London, Teatro alla Scala di Milano, the Bastille Paris, to the State Operas of Munich, Hamburg, Berlin, Dresden and Zürich. In 2003 she made her debut at the Salzburg Festival where she has been a regular guest since then.

== Recordings ==
- Debut recital Palpiti d'amor Friedrich Haider. Orfeo.
- Slavic Opera Arias – Tchaikovsky, Parashkev Hadjiev, Borodin, Dvorak, Smetana, Rimsky-Korsakov, Veselin Stoyanov. Orfeo
- Beethoven, Missa Solemnis, Thielemann
- Strauss, ¨Der Rosenkavalier¨, Franz Welser-Möst, Salzburg Festival, DVD
- "Eugene Onegin", ROH CG, Ticciati, DVD
- "Eugene Onegin", Jansons, DVD
- Verdi, Requiem, Mariss Jansons.
- Verdi, "Otello", Liceo, Ros-Maria, DVD
- Verdi, "Otello", Muti, CD
- Verdi, "Un ballo in maschera", Gelmetti, DVD
- Verdi, Arias, Baleff, CD
- Puccini, Complete Songs, Prinz, CD
- Rossini, Petite Messe Solennelle, Creed, CD
