= Mednikarov Peak =

Mountain in Antarctica

Location of Alexander Island in the Antarctic Peninsula region

Satellite image of Alexander Island

Mednikarov Peak (Bulgarian: Медникаров връх, romanized: Mednikarov vrah, IPA: [mɛdniˈkarɔv vrɤx]) is the ice-covered peak rising to 3007 m on the west side of Rouen Mountains in northern Alexander Island, Antarctica. It surmounts Roberts Ice Piedmont on the east. The peak's vicinity was visited on 6 January 1988 by the geological team of Christo Pimpirev and Borislav Kamenov (First Bulgarian Antarctic Expedition), and Philip Nell and Peter Marquis (British Antarctic Survey).

The feature is named after Flotilla admiral Boyan Mednikarov, rector of the Nikola Vaptsarov Naval Academy in Varna that jointly with the Bulgarian Antarctic Institute has acquired and operates the polar research vessel Sts. Cyril and Methodius.

== Location ==
Mednikarov Peak is located at 69°04′22.0″S 70°45′42.6″W, which is 12.55 km south-southwest of Mount Paris, 3.3 km southwest of Mount Hankey, 13.7 km north of Mount Hall and 8.5 km east of Danailov Peak.

== Maps ==
- British Antarctic Territory. Scale 1:200000 topographic map. DOS 610 – W 69 70. Tolworth, UK, 1971
- British Antarctic Survey, 2025. Alexander Island, 1:500 000 scale map. BAS Topographic Series, Sheet 4, Edition 1. Cambridge, British Antarctic Survey.
- Antarctic Digital Database (ADD). Scale 1:250000 topographic map of Antarctica. Scientific Committee on Antarctic Research (SCAR). Since 1993, regularly upgraded and updated
