= Breze, Sofia Province =

Breze Брезе
- Village
- Location in Bulgaria
- Coordinates: 43.033634°N 23.197555°E
- Country: Bulgaria
- Province: Sofia Province
- Municipality: Svoge

Population (2016)
  - Total: 170
- Time zone: UTC+2 (EET)
  - Summer (DST): UTC+3 (EEST)

Breze is a village in Svoge Municipality, Sofia Province, western Bulgaria.

Breze Peak in Antarctica is named after the village.
