= National Academy of Music (Bulgaria) =

Music academy in Sofia

- Националната музикална академия „Проф. Панчо Владигеров“
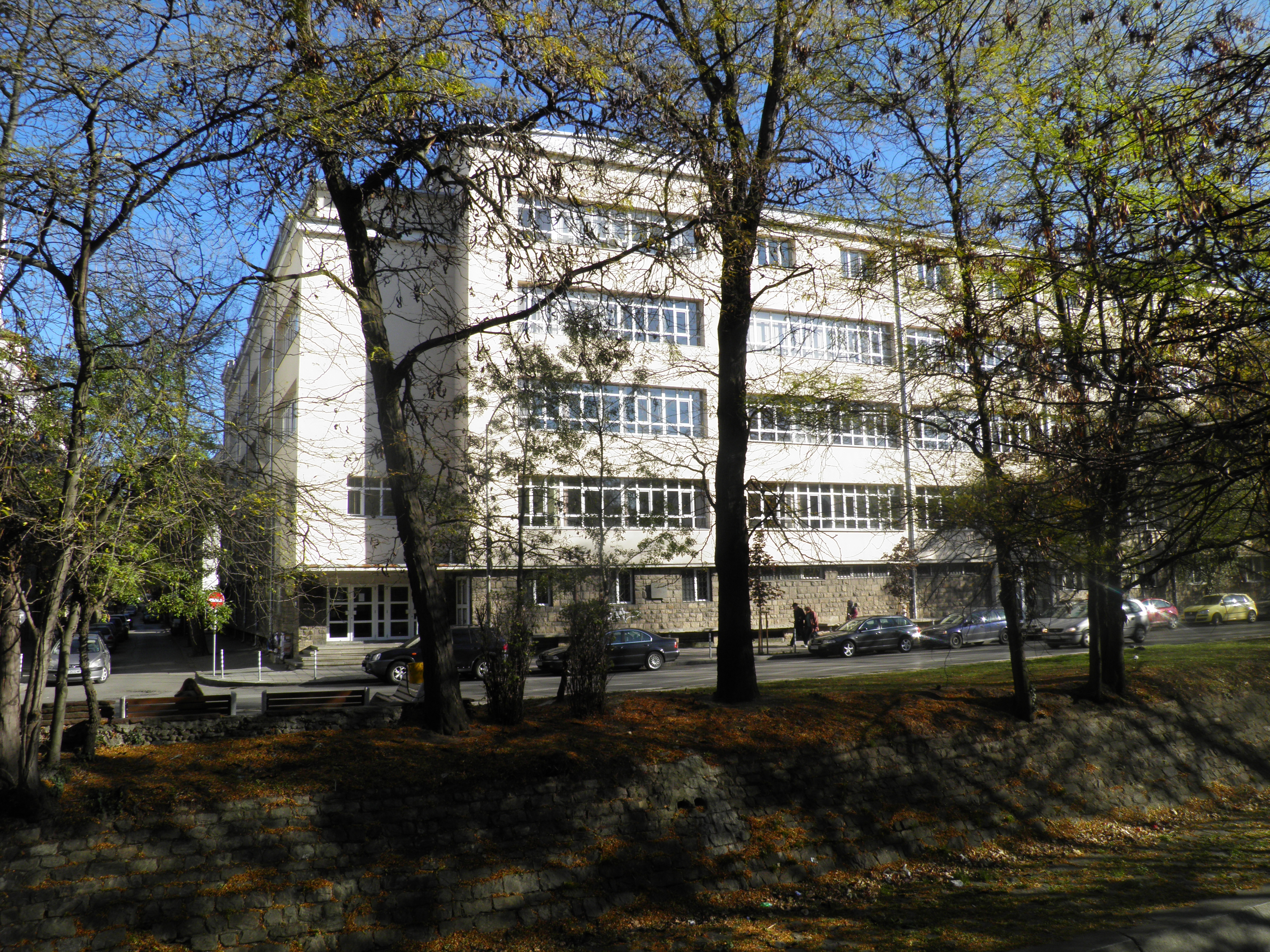
- Type: Music academy
- Established: 21 July 1921; 105 years ago
- Location: Sofia, Bulgaria; 42°41′42″N 23°20′50″E
- Website: nma.bg

The National Academy of Music "Prof. Pancho Vladigerov" (Bulgarian: Национална музикална академия „Панчо Владигеров“, Natsionalna muzikalna akademia „Pancho Vladigerov“), also known under its former name, the Bulgarian State Conservatoire (Българска държавна консерватория, Balgarska darzhavna konservatoria), is a university of music in Sofia, the capital of Bulgaria.

Founded in 1921 through a royal decree of Tsar Boris III, it is named after influential Bulgarian composer Pancho Vladigerov (1899–1978).

Two buildings house the academy. It offers 30 programmes divided into three faculties: the Faculty of Theory, Composition and Conducting; the Instrumental Faculty; and the Vocal Faculty.

== Notable graduates ==
- Albert Cohen
- Victor Chuchkov
- Ghena Dimitrova
- Yulia Gurkovska
- Milen E. Ivanov
- Raina Kabaivanska
- Ramiz Kovaçi
- Kiril Manolov
- Grigor Palikarov
- Alexander Raichev
- Anna-Maria Ravnopolska-Dean
- Stefan Remenkov
- Slavi Trifonov
- Tsvetan Tsvetanov (also faculty)
- Girma Yifrashewa
- Alexander Yossifov
