= Breze, Tuzla =

Village in Bosnia and Herzegovina

Breze
- Village
- Location within Bosnia and Herzegovina
- Coordinates: 44.493472°N 18.5795204°E
- Country: Bosnia and Herzegovina
- Entity: Federation of Bosnia and Herzegovina
- Canton: Tuzla
- Municipality: Tuzla

Area
  - Total: 1.63 sq mi (4.22 km^{2})

Population (2013)
  - Total: 496
  - Density: 304/sq mi (118/km^{2})
- Time zone: UTC+1 (CET)
  - Summer (DST): UTC+2 (CEST)

Breze is a village in the municipality of Tuzla, Tuzla Canton, Bosnia and Herzegovina.

== Demographics ==
According to the 2013 census, its population was 496.

Ethnicity in 2013
Ethnicity	Number	Percentage
Bosniaks	248	50.0%
Croats	206	41.5%
Serbs	8	1.6%
other/undeclared	34	6.9%
Total	496	100%
