= Mount Holt =

Mountain in Antarctica

- Location within Antarctica

Highest point
- Elevation: 750 metres (2,460 ft)
- Coordinates: 69°25′S 71°43′W

Geography
- Location: Lazarev Bay, Alexander Island, Antarctica

Mount Holt is a mountain rising to about 750 metres (2,460 ft) at the terminus of Palestrina Glacier, Lazarev Bay, on Alexander Island, Antarctica. It is situated 9.2 km southeast of Piyanets Ridge, 19.2 km south-southwest of Mount Pontida and 7.4 km northwest of Galerius Peak. The mountain was photographed from the air by the Ronne Antarctic Research Expedition, 1947–48, and was mapped from the photos by D. Searle of the Falkland Islands Dependencies Survey in 1960. It was named by the Advisory Committee on Antarctic Names for Commander Fred C. Holt, U.S. Navy, Commanding Officer of Squadron VXE-6 during Operation Deep Freeze in 1976, and an LC-130 aircraft commander in 1975.

Commander Holt died peacefully at his Columbus GA home, surrounded by his family, on 26 OCT 2020. Acute kidney failure was the cause of death.

Fair winds and following seas, Commander.
