= Mount Newman =

Mountain in Antarctica

Location of Alexander Island in the Antarctic Peninsula region

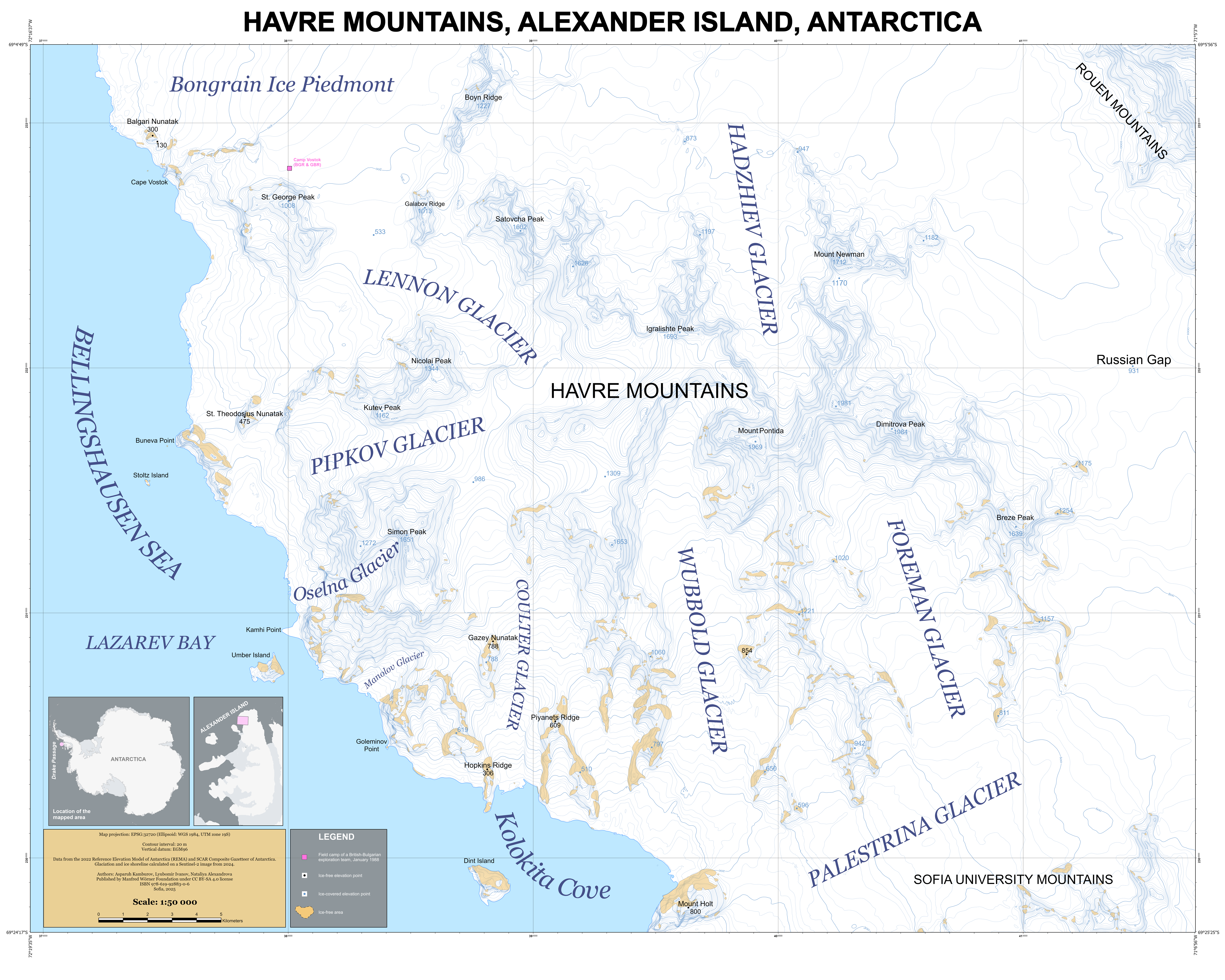
Map of Havre Mountains, Alexander Island in Antarctica

Mount Newman (69°11′S 71°26′W) is a mountain rising to about 1,150 m in northeast Havre Mountains, north Alexander Island, Antarctica. Situated 13.23 km south of Satovcha Peak, 13.15 km north-northwest of Breze Peak, 8.26 km northeast of Mount Pontida and 7.34 km east-northeast of Igralishte Peak. The mountain was first surveyed by the British Antarctic Survey (BAS), 1975–76. Named by United Kingdom Antarctic Place-Names Committee (UK-APC) in 1980 after John Newman, BAS Diesel mechanic, Adelaide, 1968–69; Stonington Island, 1969–70 and 1972–74; who was instrumental in modifying BAS motor sledges, first used successfully as replacements for dog teams on this survey.

== See also ==
- Mount McArthur
- Mount Nicholas
- Mount Sanderson
