= Frachat Glacier =

Glacier on Alexander Island, Antarctica

Frachat Glacier (69°08′00″S 70°58′00″W) is a glacier flowing southwest from the Rouen Mountains into the Russian Gap on north Alexander Island. In association with other French Antarctic Expedition names in the area, it was named by the UK Antarctic Place-names Committee in 1980 after M. Frachat, the motor engineer on Pourquoi Pas? on the French Antarctic Expedition, 1908–10, one of the first expeditions to take motorized transport to Antarctica.
