= Bongrain Ice Piedmont =

Bongrain Ice Piedmont (69°0′S 71°30′W) is an ice piedmont, 27 nautical miles long in a northeast–southwest direction and 12 nautical miles wide in its widest part, occupying the northwest coastal area of Alexander Island. Mount Bayonne lies to the east and Cape Vostok lies southwest of Bongrain Ice Piedmont. It was first seen from a distance and roughly surveyed by the French Antarctic Expedition, 1908–10, (FrAE) under Jean-Baptiste Charcot, and later photographed from the air by the British Graham Land Expedition on August 15, 1936, and roughly mapped from these photos. It was named by the UK Antarctic Place-Names Committee in 1954 for Maurice Bongrain, surveyor of the FrAE, who was responsible for the first map of this coast.

== See also ==
- Mozart Ice Piedmont
- Handel Ice Piedmont
