= Russian Gap =

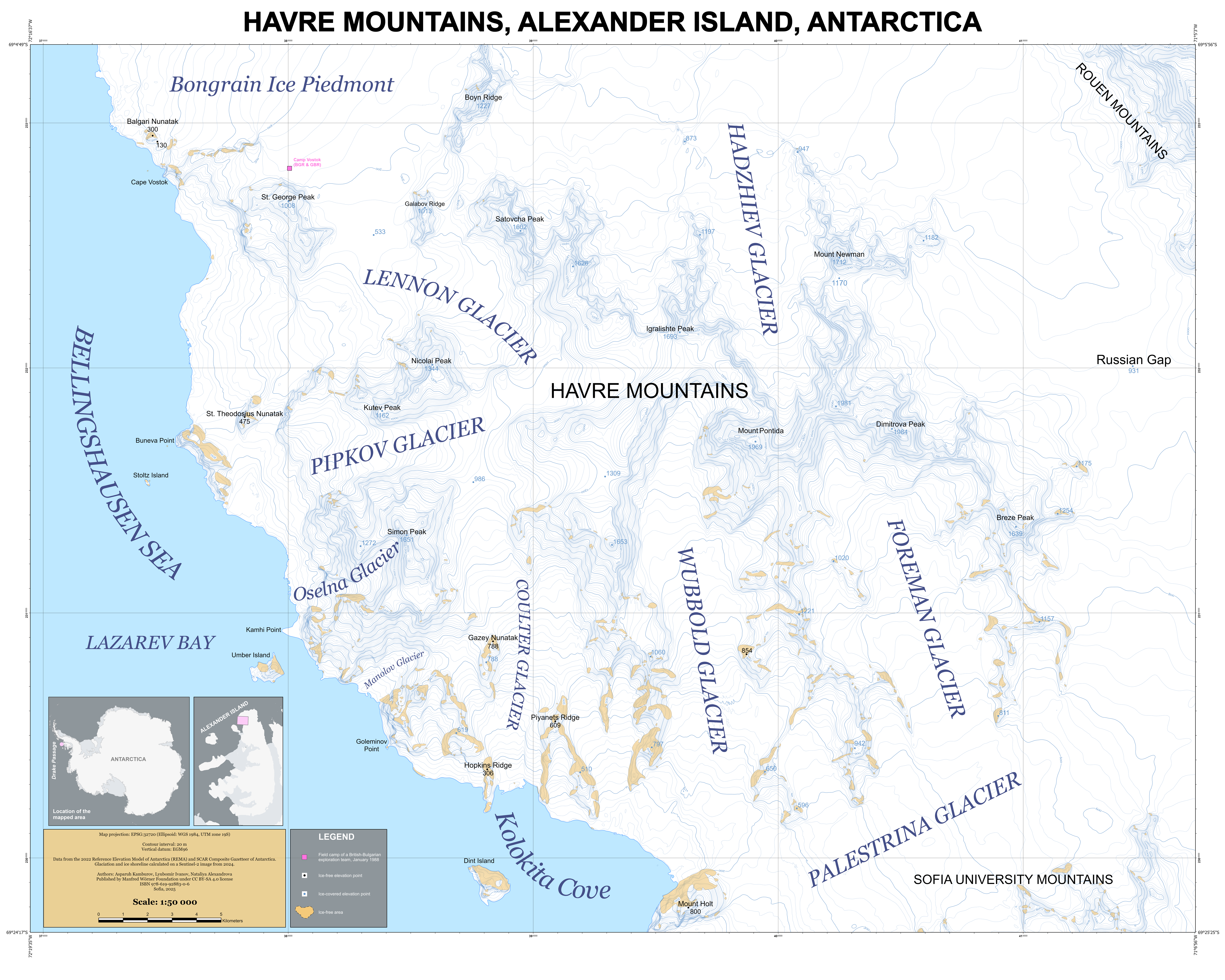
Map of Havre Mountains, Alexander Island in Antarctica

Russian Gap (69°11′S 71°13′W) is a gap extending in a north–south direction between the Havre Mountains and Rouen Mountains, in the north part of Alexander Island, Antarctica. The north coast of Alexander Island was first sketched from a great distance in 1821 by the Russian expedition under Fabian Gottlieb von Bellingshausen and this gap apparently represented by one of two open spaces between three high features. The gap was mapped in detail from air photos taken by the Ronne Antarctic Research Expedition (RARE), 1947–48, by Searle of the Falkland Islands Dependencies Survey (FIDS) in 1960. Named by the United Kingdom Antarctic Place-Names Committee (UK-APC) for the Russian group which observed this area in 1821. The Russian Gap and Edwards Gap are the only two gaps of Alexander Island.
