= Havre Mountains =

Mountain range in Antarctica

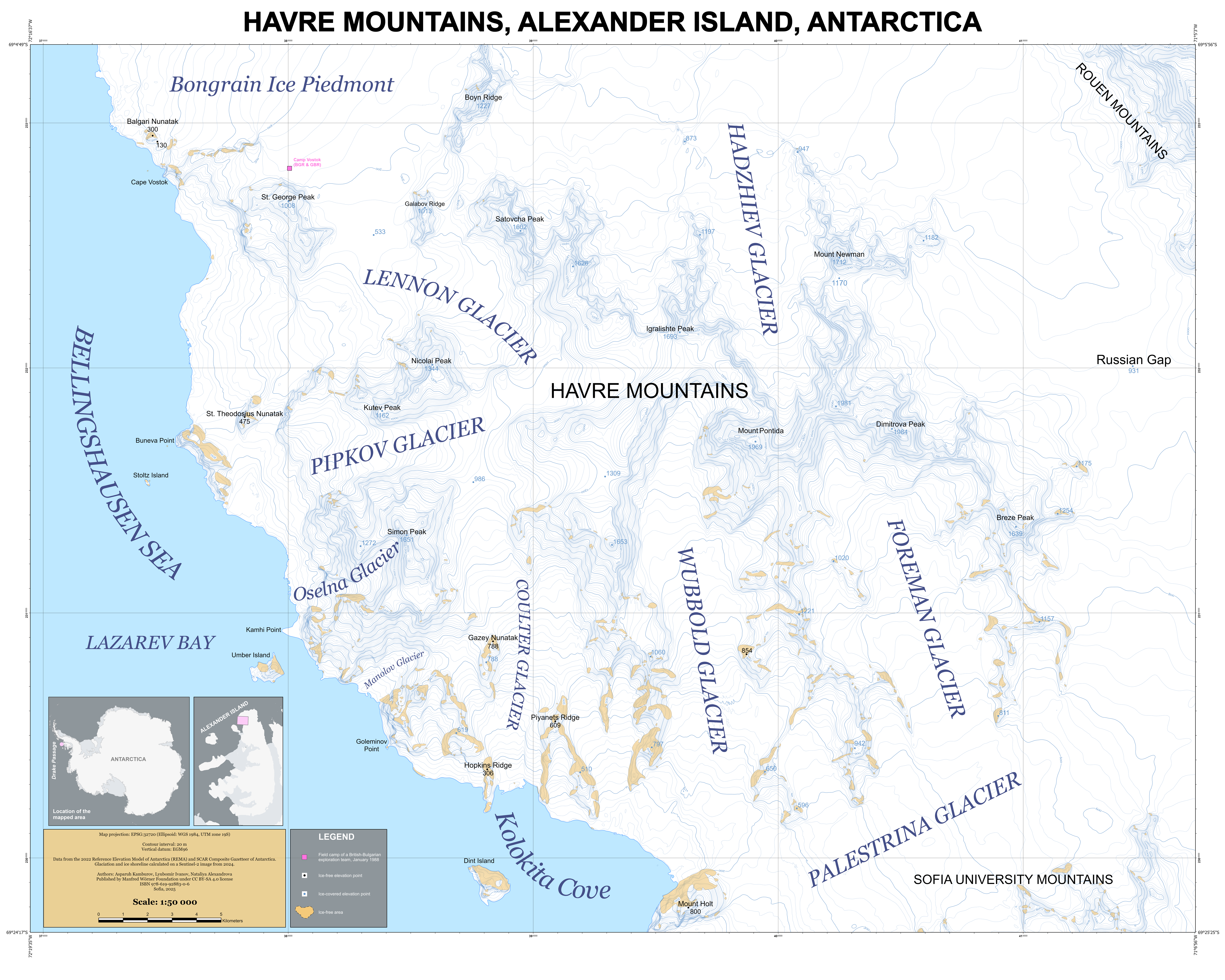
Map of Havre Mountains, Alexander Island in Antarctica

The Havre Mountains (69°8′S 71°40′W) are a large group of mountains forming the northwestern extremity of Alexander Island, Antarctica, extending 20 nautical miles (37 km) in an east–west direction between Cape Vostok and the Russian Gap, and rising to 1,984 metres (6,509 ft) at Dimitrova Peak. They were first seen in 1821 by a Russian expedition under Fabian Gottlieb von Bellingshausen and re-sighted by the Belgian Antarctic Expedition, 1897–99. They were roughly charted by the French Antarctic Expedition, 1908–10, under Jean-Baptiste Charcot, who named them for Le Havre, the French port from which the Pourquol Pas? sailed in 1908. The mountains were mapped in detail from air photos taken by the Ronne Antarctic Research Expedition, 1947–48, by D. Searle of the Falkland Islands Dependencies Survey in 1960.

== See also ==
- Lassus Mountains
- Rouen Mountains
