= Zhivko Vasilev =

Bulgarian Musical artist

Zhivko Vasilev Живко Василев
- Vasilev playing kaval in 2026

Background information
- Born: April 26, 1991 (age 35); Smolyan, Bulgaria
- Origin: Sofia, Bulgaria
- Genres: Balkan folk, jazz fusion, world music, ethno jazz
- Occupations: Kaval player, composer, educator
- Instruments: Kaval
- Years active: 2012–present
- Labels: Gega New, O-Tone Music
- Website: Official website

Zhivko Vasilev (Bulgarian: Живко Василев; born 26 April 1991) is a Bulgarian kaval player, composer and educator. He is known for integrating traditional Bulgarian folk music played on the kaval with modern musical genres, including jazz, Latin jazz, funk, pop, and symphonic music.

== Biography ==
Vasilev was born in 1991, in Smolyan, located in the Rhodope Mountains region of southern Bulgaria. He attended the National School of Arts "Dobri Hristov" in Varna, where he studied classical and folk kaval performance. In 2014, he earned Bachelor of Arts degree in Music Pedagogy and Kaval Performance from Sofia University "St. Kliment Ohridski". Later, Vasilev enrolled at Codarts University for the Arts in Rotterdam, Netherlands, completing a Master of Music degree in Jazz Performance in 2021.

In 2012, Vasilev co-founded the Bulgarian ethno-jazz group Outhentic alongside his sister, vocalist Rayna Vasileva. The band released its debut studio album, YesToday, in 2016, followed by Transparent in 2019. The group's music blends authentic Bulgarian folklore with contemporary jazz, funk, and world rhythms. With Outhentic Vasilev performed at multiple international festivals including the Glastonbury Festival in 2017 and the Cairo Jazz Festival in 2024.

In 2020, Vasilev joined the multi-national world fusion ensemble Arifa, performing alongside pianist Franz von Chossy, cellist Bence Huszar, and percussionist Sjahin During. With Arifa, he toured internationally across Europe and Asia and contributed as a performer and composer to their 2022 album, Danubian Voyage, released on O-Tone Music.

Vasilev also collaborates with the Slovenia piano-percussion duo Harmelogic featuring Kris Korat and Damir Mazrek, performing original compositions that merge Balkan traditional music with contemporary piano improvisation. With Harmelogico, Vasilev toured China in 2023, presenting a Balkan-jazz programme at Jazz at Lincoln Center in Shanghai. In 2026, he performed with Harmelogic in Unterföhring, Germany and appeared at the TriesteLovesJazz festival in Trieste, Italy.

Vasilev formed the duo "WOOD SKIN AIR" with percussionist Tatiana Koleva, which premiered at the Rewire Festival in The Hague in 2023 and was later presented at the Amsterdam Marimba Weekend and Varna Summer International Music Festival in 2024. In 2025, they premiered "Wood Nymphs" at the Bimhuis in Amsterdam and the Nederlandse Dansdagen festival in Maastricht.

In 2021, Vasilev released his debut solo instrumental album, Places, through the Bulgarian record label Gega New. Recorded at the Central Military Club in Sofia, the album features 10 original compositions arranged by Vasilev for an expanded 15-piece acoustic and electric ensemble, including piano, double bass, drums, percussion, classical guitar and string quartet. As a soloist, Vasilev has performed with several classical orchestra ensembles, including the Sofia Soloists Chamber Ensemble, the Sofia Philharmonic, the Varna Opera Orchestra, the Vratsa Symphony Orchestra and the Banatul Philharmonic of Timișoara. Alongside his performing career, Vasilev designs and tunes professional kavals and teaches the instrument.

In 2023, Vasilev was awarded First Prize at the national composition competition organized by Palms Music and the National Academy of Music "Prof. Pancho Vladigerov" for his composition "La Andaluza".

== Discography ==
| Category | Title | Label | Year |
|---|---|---|---|
| Solo album | Places | Gega New | 2021 |
| Solo album | Cultural Collision | Self-released | 2022 |
| With Outhentic | YesToday | Self-released | 2016 |
| With Outhentic | Transparent | Self-released | 2019 |
| With Arifa | Danubian Voyage | O-Tone Music | 2022 |
| Guest appearance | The Blue Road by Juan Garcia-Herreros (The Snow Owl) | —N/a | 2017 |
| Guest appearance | Rubi by DelPadre | —N/a | 2017 |
