= Grigor Palikarov =

Bulgarian conductor (born 1971)

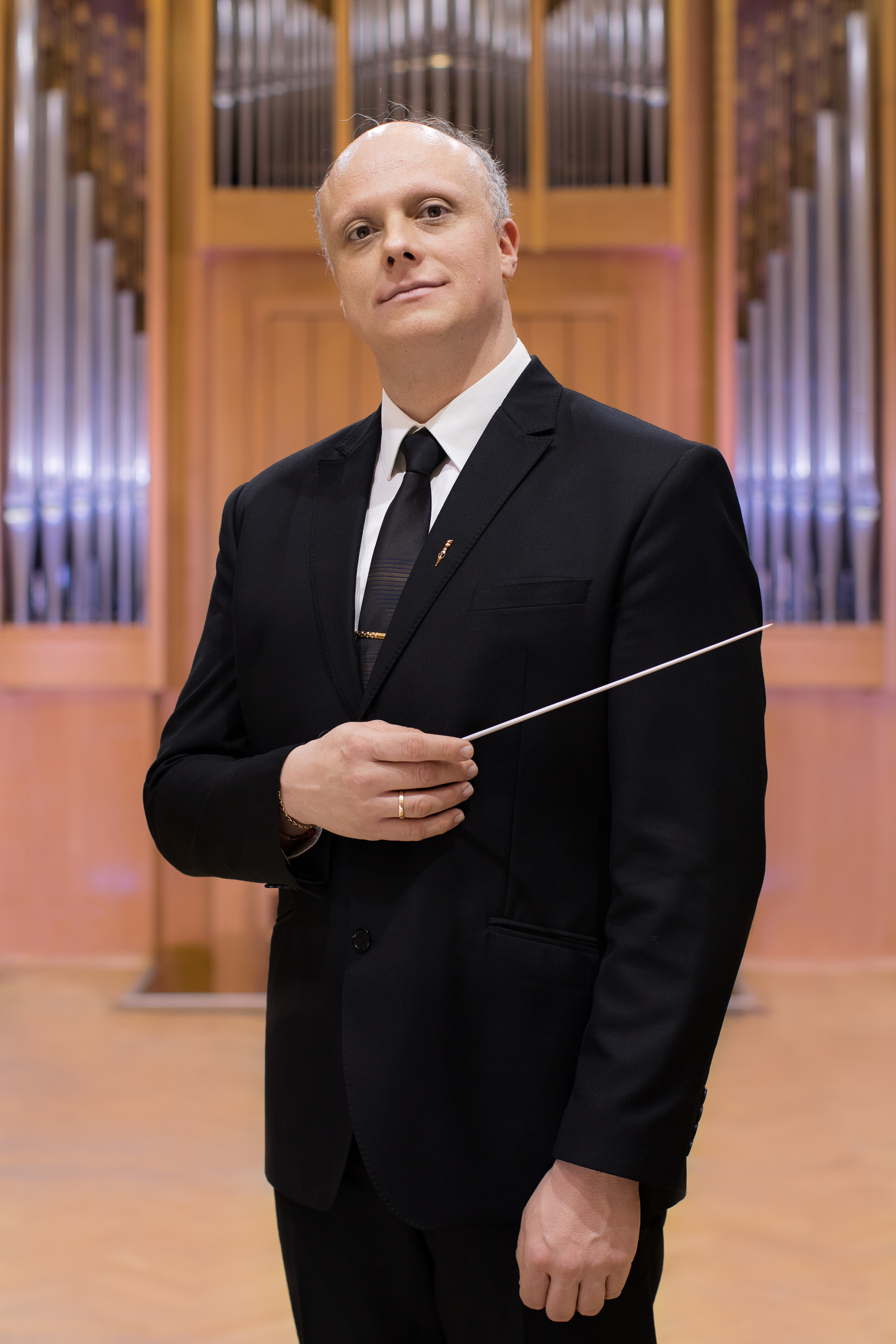
Grigor Palikarov

Grigor Palikarov (born 1971) is a Bulgarian conductor, composer, pianist and music educator.

== Early life ==
Grigor Palikarov was born in 1971 in Plovdiv. He graduated at the Pancho Vladigerov National Academy of Music (Bulgarian State Conservatoire) where he received four master's degrees in orchestral conducting, choral conducting, piano and composition. He studied Orchestral Conducting with Vassil Kazandjiev and Ivan Voulpe, Composition with Dimitar Tapkoff, Piano with Krassimir Taskov and Choral Conducting with Stoyan Kralev. Later on he continued his composition study during two Summer Academies in Austria with Erich Urbanner. He succedfully defended his Doctor of Music Degree in June 2017.

== Career ==
In the 1998–99 season, Grigor Palikarov made his first appearance on the stage of the National Opera and Ballet - Sofia, conducting a Gala-concert with the special participation of the Bulgarian opera singer Ghena Dimitrova upon her personal invitation. Later on he has made many concerts and performances with other world famous opera singers like Anna Tomowa-Sintow, Elena Obraztsova, Krassimira Stoyanova, Ferruccio Furlanetto, Kurt Rydl, Alexandrina Milcheva, Nadia Krasteva, Alexandrina Pendatchanska, Nicola Giuselev etc.

From January 2000 until April 2019 Mr. Palikarov worked as a full-time conductor at the National Opera and Ballet - Sofia, conducting a rich variety of repertoire. It included more than 60 opera and ballet titles by Mozart, Rossini, Bellini, Donizetti, Weber, Verdi, Wagner, Ponchielli, Mascagni, Leoncavallo, Puccini, Gounod, Delibes, Bizet, Borodin, Rimsky–Korsakov, Tchaikovsky, Prokofiew, Orff, Bulgarian classical and contemporary composers etc.

Later on he continued with his academic career and nowadays Mr. Palikarov is a full-time Professor and PhD at the Pancho Vladigerov National Academy of Music, teaching opera and symphony conducting.

His symphonic activities were also widely developed in the last two decades, as Maestro Palikarov has been constantly holding the position of Managing and Artistic director of the Symphony orchestra – Pazardzhik (since 2005) and Chief-conductor of State Opera – Plovdiv (since 2024).

=== Guest conductor ===
Grigor Palikarov has also built a significant career as an international guest-conductor, regularly leading orchestras in Italy, Poland, Spain, Slovenia, Mexico, Taiwan, China, Ukraine, Romania, Uruguay, the Netherlands, Japan, Korea, Hungary, Germany, Austria, Belgium, France, Luxembourg, USA, Russia, etc. He has conducted concerts and performances with Ljubljana Slovene National Theatre Opera and Ballet, Krakow opera - Poland, National Radio Orchestra of Romania – Bucharest, the Uruguayan National Orquesta Sinfónica del Sodre and Montevideo Philharmonic Orchestra, Symphony Orchestra of the National Theater "Claudio Santoro" - Brazil, National Opera and Ballet - North Macedonia, Kodaly Philharmonic - Hungary, the Częstochowa and Warmia-Mazuri Philharmonic Orchestras (Poland), Janáček Philharmonic Orchestra (Czech Republic), Sanremo Symphony Orchestra, Bari Symphony Orchestra, FVG orchestra and Orchestra Magna Grecia (Italy), Brasov and Sibiu Philharmonic Orchestras in Romania, the Xiamen Philharmonic Orchestra (China), the Yucatán Symphony Orchestra and Monterrey Symphony Orchestra (Mexico), the Taipei Century Symphony Orchestra (Taiwan), the Millenium orchestra - Seoul (Korea), the Opera Cleveland (USA), the Krasnoyarsk State Opera and Ballet (Russia), the Dnipro Philharmonic Leonid Cogan (Ukraine) and the Thessaloniki Symphony Orchestra - Greece, among many others.

In Bulgaria he makes a lot of concerts and performances with Bulgaria's leading orchestras, such as: Sofia Philhatrmonic Orchestra, Bulgarian National Radio Symphony Orchestra, Varna Opera Theatre (where he is a permanent guest-conductor), National Opera and Ballet - Sofia, Plovdiv Opera Theatre and Burgas Opera Theatre among many others.

He has shared the stage with many famous soloists like the members of Vienna Philharmonic: Albena Danailova (concertmaster), Wolfgang Schulz, Franz Bartolomey, Dieter Flury and others; Glenn Dicterow (former concertmaster of New York Philharmonic; Svetlin Roussev (former concertmaster of the French National Radio orchestra and ), Vesko Eschkenazy (concertmaster of the Royal Concertgebow orchestra), Dmitriy Sitkovetsky, Daniel Hope and many others.

== Reviews ==
His US debut was mentioned by the critics there as "one of the most important musical events for year 2009 for Ohio State" .

== Recordings ==
Grigor Palikarov makes regular recordings of orchestral pieces, opera arias and ensembles as a guest conductor of the Bulgarian National Radio Symphony Orchestra.

Some of his recordings can be found on CDs and DVDs produced by different companies.

== Others ==
Together with his conducting activities Mr. Palikarov composes music and performs as a piano soloist with different orchestras in Bulgaria. He has been awarded with a “Crystal Lyre” Annual Music Award four times (in 2002, 2012, 2017 and 2022); a “Golden Lyre” Award in 2021 for outstanding contribution to Bulgarian musical art and on the occasion of his 50th anniversary; a “Golden Quill” Award in 2009; “Emil Tchakarov” special prize in 2019 and the "Phoenix" Award of the State Opera - Varna in connection with the 80th anniversary of the establishment of the Varna Symphony Orchestra in 2026. He also served two terms as Chairman of the Bulgarian branch of “Mensa”, an international organization of people with a high IQ

== Works (selections) ==
Choral-orchestral:

- Cantata: Hodie Christus natus est for female voices choir and symphony orchestra (1995–97)

Symphony orchestra:

- Concert piece for piano and orchestra (1998)

String orchestra:

- Elegy (1995)

Chamber music:

- Four Pieces for flute, French horn and double bass (version for bassoon and piano) (1997)
- Piano Sonata (1994–95)

Choral music:

- Mixed choir: Three Songs (1992-93)
- Three Psalms to Virgin Mary (1998–99)
