= Martin Georgiev (composer) =

British composer and conductor

- Мартин Георгиев Георгиев
- Born: December 19, 1983 (age 42); Varna, Bulgaria
- Education: Royal Academy of Music
- Occupation: Composer Conductor
- Website: martingeorgiev.net

Martin Georgiev Georgiev (Мартин Георгиев Георгиев; born 19 December 1983) is a British-Bulgarian composer and conductor.

== Biography ==
=== Early life and education ===
Georgiev was born in Varna, Bulgaria. He studied music at the National School of Arts in Varna and won over 20 awards and scholarships as a composer, conductor, and percussionist. Amongst them was the Grand Prize for Symphony Composition at the 75th anniversary of the Sofia National Philharmonic Orchestra that he received at the age of 19, and the TACTUS Prize of the International Composer’s Forum in Brussels where he was nominated in 2004, 2008 and 2011.

He graduated from the National Academy of Music in Sofia and the Royal Academy of Music in London, where he studied conducting with Colin Metters, Sir Colin Davis, and George Hurst on an ABRSM International Scholarship. In 2013, he completed a PhD in Composition at the Royal Academy of Music under the supervision of Philip Cashian, Sir Peter Maxwell Davies, Sir Harrison Birtwistle, and Julian Anderson, on a scholarship by the Wingate Foundation.

=== Career ===
In 2012-13 Georgiev was Composer in Residence to the City of Heidelberg, where he composed his symphonic work The Secret and conducted the Heidelberg Philharmonic Orchestra. In 2010-11 he was Embedded Composer with the BBC Symphony Orchestra.

Georgiev has been a member of the conducting staff at the Royal Ballet and Opera, Covent Garden, since 2013 and was promoted to Staff Conductor in 2023. At the Royal Opera House he conducted classical and contemporary productions, such as, Swan Lake, Cinderella, Romeo and Juliet, Mayerling, Giselle, Alice's Adventures in Wonderland and Woolf Works.

Amongst others, he has appeared as conductor and composer with the Birmingham Royal Ballet, The Australian Ballet, London Mozart Players, Brussels Philharmonic, Teatro dell'Opera di Roma, National Orchestra of Belgium, Netherlands Dance Theatre, Bulgarian National Radio Symphony Orchestra, Northern Ballet, Orchestra Victoria, Adelaide Symphony Orchestra, Varna Opera House, Kammerorkest van het Noorden, Azalea, Ukrainian Festival Orchestra and Cosmic Voices.

=== Artistic approach and research ===
Georgiev's music blends contemporary techniques with Bulgarian folk music and Byzantine Orthodox chant. Central to his work is the technique Morphing Modality, which he developed during his PhD. In addition to composing and conducting, he remains active as a percussion soloist, has recorded for Bulgarian National Radio, and works as a record producer.

== Selected works ==
Category	Work	Year	Details	Reference
Compositions	Bryag	2023	Symphonic poem (orchestral)	
Compositions	The Secret	2012	Orchestral	
Compositions	A Seasong	2011	Orchestral	
Compositions	Heavenly Reflections	2006	Orchestral	
Compositions	Passacaglia on Two Bulgarian Themes	c. 2003	Orchestral	
Compositions	Violin Concerto	2020	Concerto	
Compositions	Percussion Concerto No. 3 Genesis	2011 (rev. 2014)	Concerto	
Compositions	Piano Concerto	2022	Concerto	
Compositions	Cello Concerto	2022	Concerto	
Compositions	Percussion Concerto No. 2 Light	2010	Concerto	
Compositions	The Mirror	2009	Opera	
Compositions	Sonata for Trumpet and Piano Alpha and Omega	2023	Chamber	
Compositions	String Quartet No. 1	2010	Chamber	
Compositions	Doxologies of Bells and Candlelight	2014	Chamber	
Discography	Genesis	2016–17	Symphonic Triptych No. 1 and Percussion Concerto No. 3, with Tatiana Koleva (marimba) and the Bulgarian National Radio Symphony Orchestra, conducted by the composer (ICSM Records)	
Discography	Violin Concerto	2020	With Vasko Vassilev (violin) and the Covent Garden Soloists	
