= Bingo Symphony Orchestra =

Bulgarian music group

The Bingo Symphony Orchestra is a Bulgarian classical underground music group formed in 2017 for the spectacle The Bingo Project. The group consists of musicians Evden Dimitrov, Orlin Tsvetanov, Sofia Radilova, Mladen Taskov, Stefan Goranov and Georgi Marinov. Some of the members are part of the Bulgarian National Radio Symphony Orchestra, funk fusion group Funky Miracle, and underground groups Wozzeck & Chugra and Slav de Hren. Violinist Orlin Tsvetanov is part of the Sofia Soloists Chamber Orchestra, drummer and composer Stefan Goranov toured European countries in various groups, bassist Evden Dimitrov who goes by the artistic pseudonym EVDN. released his debut solo single in 2022. In The Bingo Project, the Bingo Symphony Orchestra plays classical pieces by composers such as Shostakovich, Prokofiev, Tchaikovsky, Mussorgsky, and Khachaturian. The spectacle was later transformed into The Ballet Melee movie, with Bingo Symphony Orchestra as members of the cast
