= Yucatán Symphony Orchestra =

- Orchestra
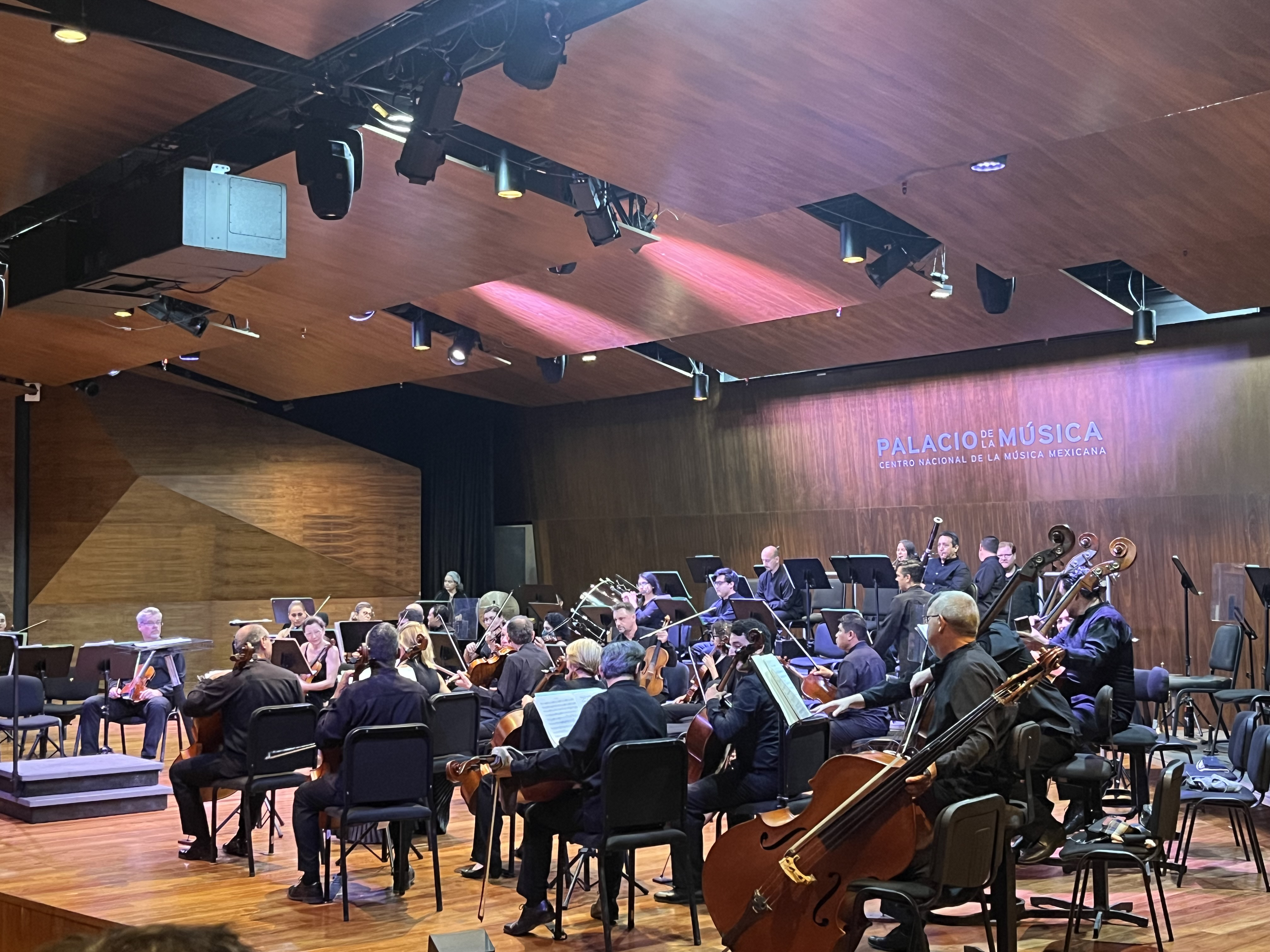
- The orchestra at the Palacio de la Música in downtown Mérida.
- Native name: Orquesta Sinfónica de Yucatán
- Short name: OSY
- Founded: 2004; 22 years ago
- Location: Mérida, Mexico
- Concert hall: Palacio de la Música
- Principal conductor: José Areán
- Website: sinfonicadeyucatan.com.mx

The Yucatán Symphony Orchestra (OSY) is a symphony orchestra based in Mérida, Yucatán, México. It was founded in 2004 and has maintained performances in the Mexican state of Yucatán ever since. Located in the Palacio de la Música and formerly in the José Peón Contreras theater, the orchestra performs 2-3 subscription concerts every month in addition to special community events in the Mérida area. Its previous guest conductors have included Maciej Żółtowski, Grigor Palikarov, and Michele Santorsola, and it has performed with soloists such as Jorge Federico Osorio, Carlos Prieto, Alexei Volodin, Stephanie Chase, and Leticia Moreno. Its current music director is José Areán.

== History ==
=== Predecessor orchestras, 1898-2002 ===
Before the official founding of the OSY, musicians made several attempts at forming orchestras in Mérida, dating back to the 19th century. On September 17, 1898, an orchestra organized by José Cuevas Pachón and inspired by concerts from Mexico City performed in the José Peón Contreras theater. In 1906, Pachón organized an orchestra once again to perform at a party for Mexico's president, Porfirio Díaz. Afterwards, Pachón formed an orchestra as a part of his music institute, yet was unable to fully develop it due to having fallen ill. The efforts of his replacement, the music student Amilcar Cetina Gutiérrez, to continue and expand upon Pachón's orchestra ultimately failed due to the fall of Felipe Carillo Puerto's government after the assassination of Venustiano Carranza.

From 1925 to 1935, the musician Francisco Sánchez Rejón conducted an ensemble called the Orquesta Sinfónica de Mérida. It performed works by classical and early romantic era composers and enjoyed a period of success, giving thirty-four concerts in total. Due to being appointed as the State Band director, Rejón stepped down from his position as music director. In 1936, violinist and ethnomusicologist Samuel Martí, who initially traveled to Mérida to study the music of the indigenous Maya people, began an orchestra jointly conducted by himself and Rejón that lasted for two years and performed six concerts in total.

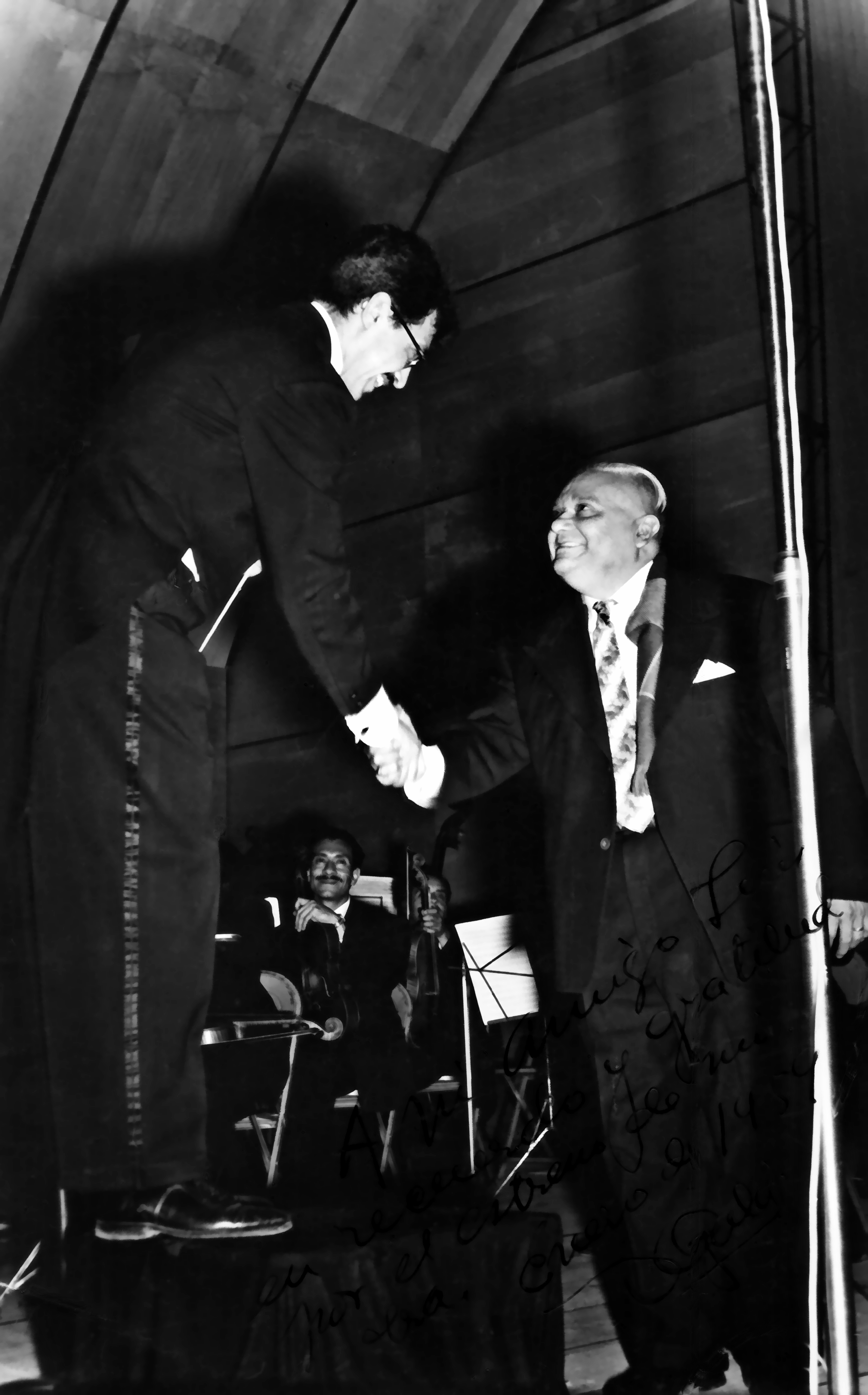
Daniel Ayala Perez (right) in 1955

In 1944, the Yucatec musician Daniel Ayala founded the Yucatecan Conservatory, along with an orchestra which lasted for six years and which programmed seven seasons of concerts including both indigenous Maya and European music. It made its debut on November 15, 1944, in the José Peón Contreras theater. In 1975, the Mexican musician Carlos Tello Solís began an effort to revive an orchestra for the city after a period of no ensembles or performances. The consequence was the formation of another orchestra by the Mexican government, making its debut on September 15, 1975, in the government palace under the baton of Julián Durán Flores. In total, the orchestra gave 113 concerts and performed into the 1980s. Notably, it continued Ayala's tradition of including music composed by Yucatecans; for example, it performed Gustavo Río Escalante's Symphony No.1 in F major.

Between 1987 and 2002, the Autonomous University of Yucatán collaborated with the Institute of Culture to perform a dozen orchestral concerts led by Miguel Pérez Concha in locations including Mérida, Miami, Florida, and Chichen-Itza. The ensemble was composed of music students from both Mérida and Miami. All of the efforts during the 20th century to form an orchestra, ultimately, were short-lived and temporary in comparison with the orchestra that would be founded in 2004 and continues to this day.

=== An orchestra for Mérida, 2001-2023 ===
The fund for the support of the OSY was founded in February 2001 in Mérida by the Institute of Culture with Domingo Rodriguez, Mari Eli Sosa, and Leroy Osmon as organizers under the direction of the governor. Through a joint venture by the Yucatán State Government and the Orquesta Sinfónica de Yucatán foundation, the Yucatán Symphony Orchestra made its debut on February 27, 2004, under its first conductor, the Colombian musician Juan Felipe Molano Muñoz. Its main performing venue was the José Peón Contreras theater in Mérida, renovated in 2011 to include a 700-seat capacity.

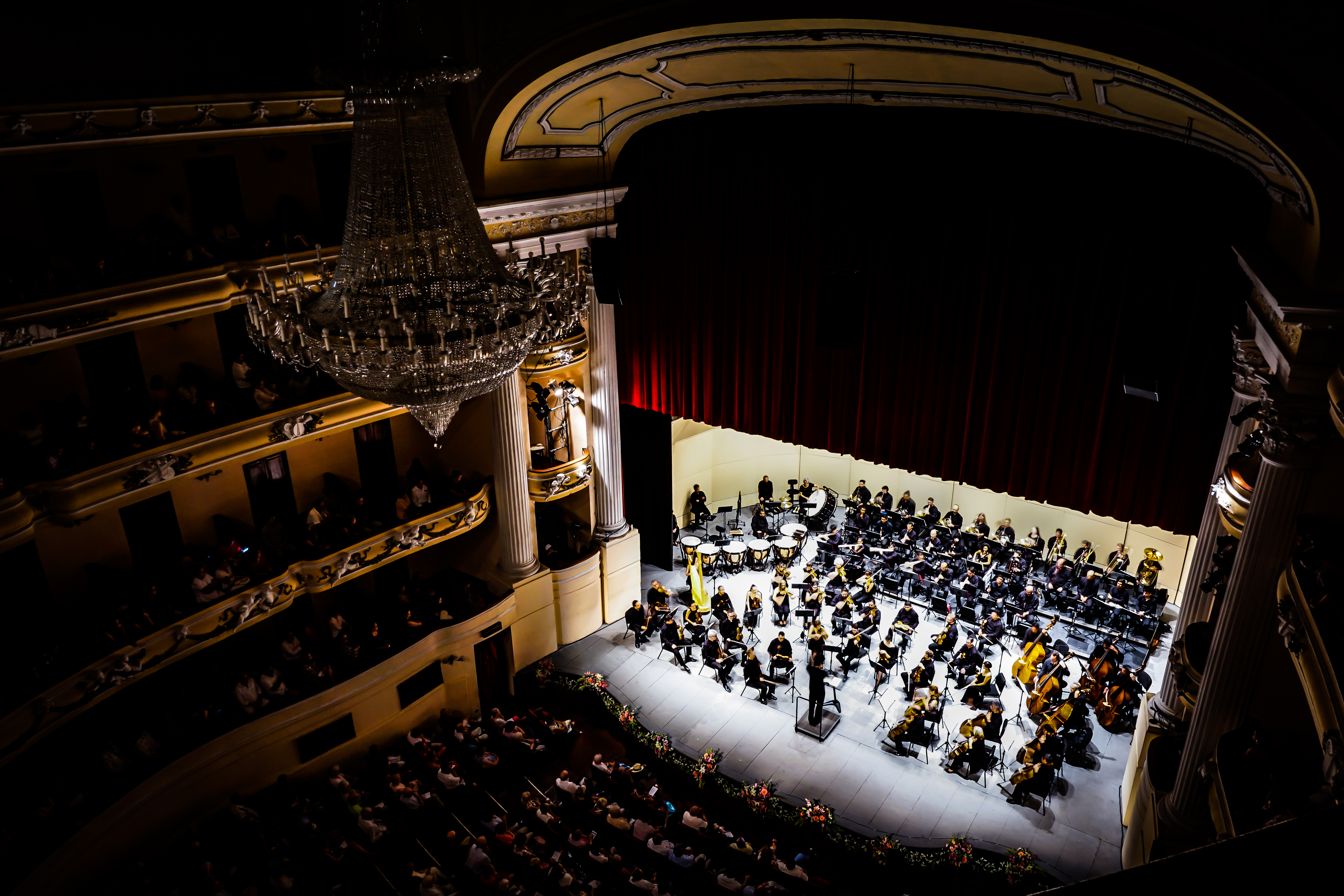
February 2019 - The Yucatán Symphony Orchestra performing Mahler Symphony No. 1 at the José Peón Contreras theater for its 15th anniversary concert.

In early 2009, Juan Carlos Lomónaco was appointed as the new music director of the OSY, having previously conducted the National Symphony Orchestra of Mexico. Between 2009 and 2022, both the main performance space and conductor of the orchestra remained the same, and the ensemble gained members. However, in November 2022, a short circuit triggered a fire in the José Peón Contreras Center, causing significant damage. The OSY has since moved its performances to the Palacio de la Música (Palace of Music) in the center of Mérida. Juan Carlos Lomónaco stayed on as its music director until March 2023, when the OSY Committee, formed by the Yucatán Secretary of Culture, announced its replacement of Juan Carlos Lomónaco with José Areán as the new musical director. This change was made along with an effort to include the more music written by Yucatecan composers and to perform for a wider variety of audiences.

== Music directors ==
- Victor Mayer (2002–2004)
- Juan Felipe Molano Muñoz (2004–2007)
- José Luis Chan Sabido (January–June 2008)
- Juan Carlos Lomónaco (2009–2023)
- José Areán (2023–Present)

== Concertmasters ==
- First Concertmaster Christopher Collins Lee (2006–Present)
- Concertmaster Gocha Skhirtladze (2004–Present)

== Performance venues ==
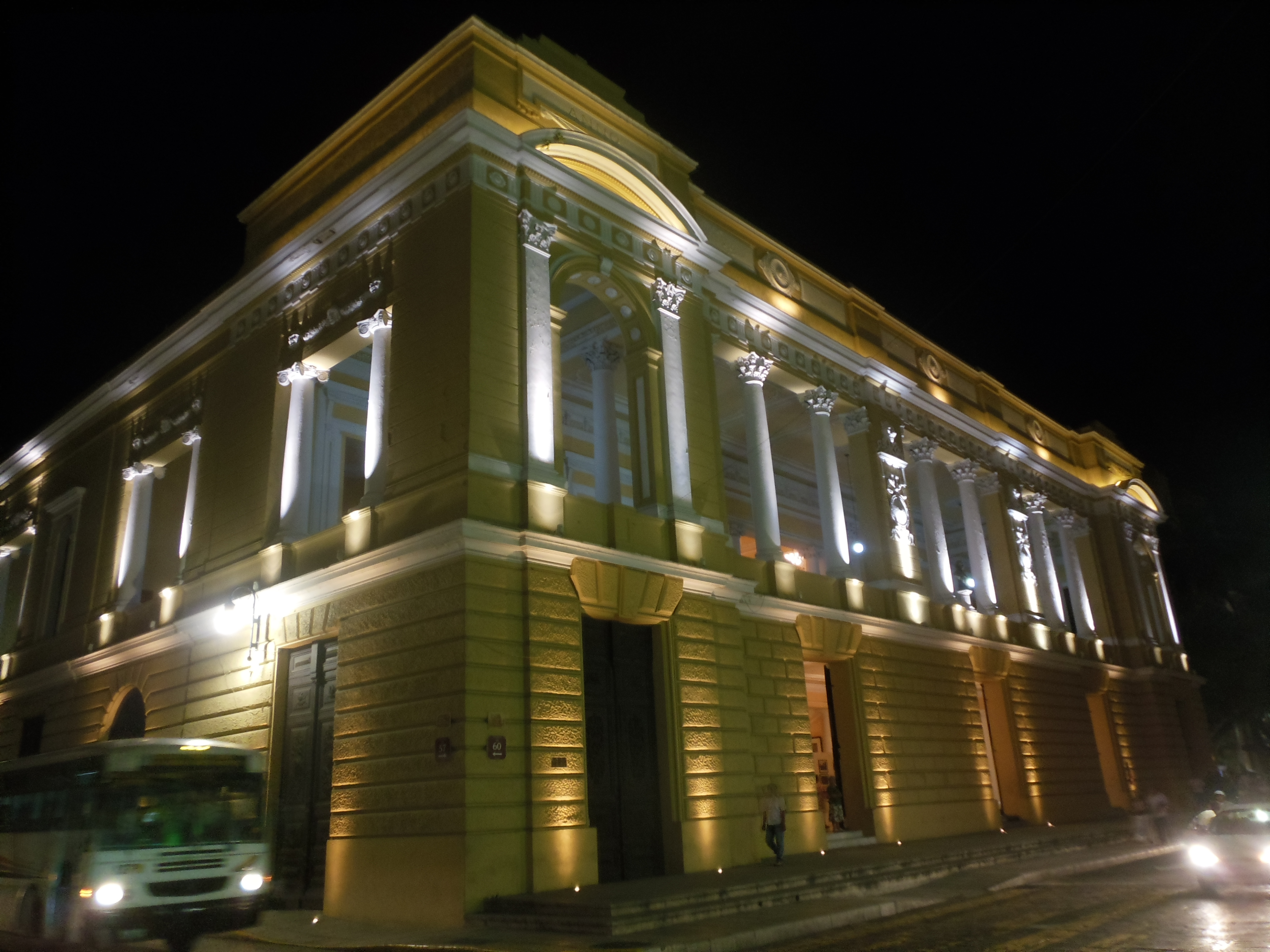
The José Peón Contreras Theater, the orchestra's main concert hall from 2004 to 2022.

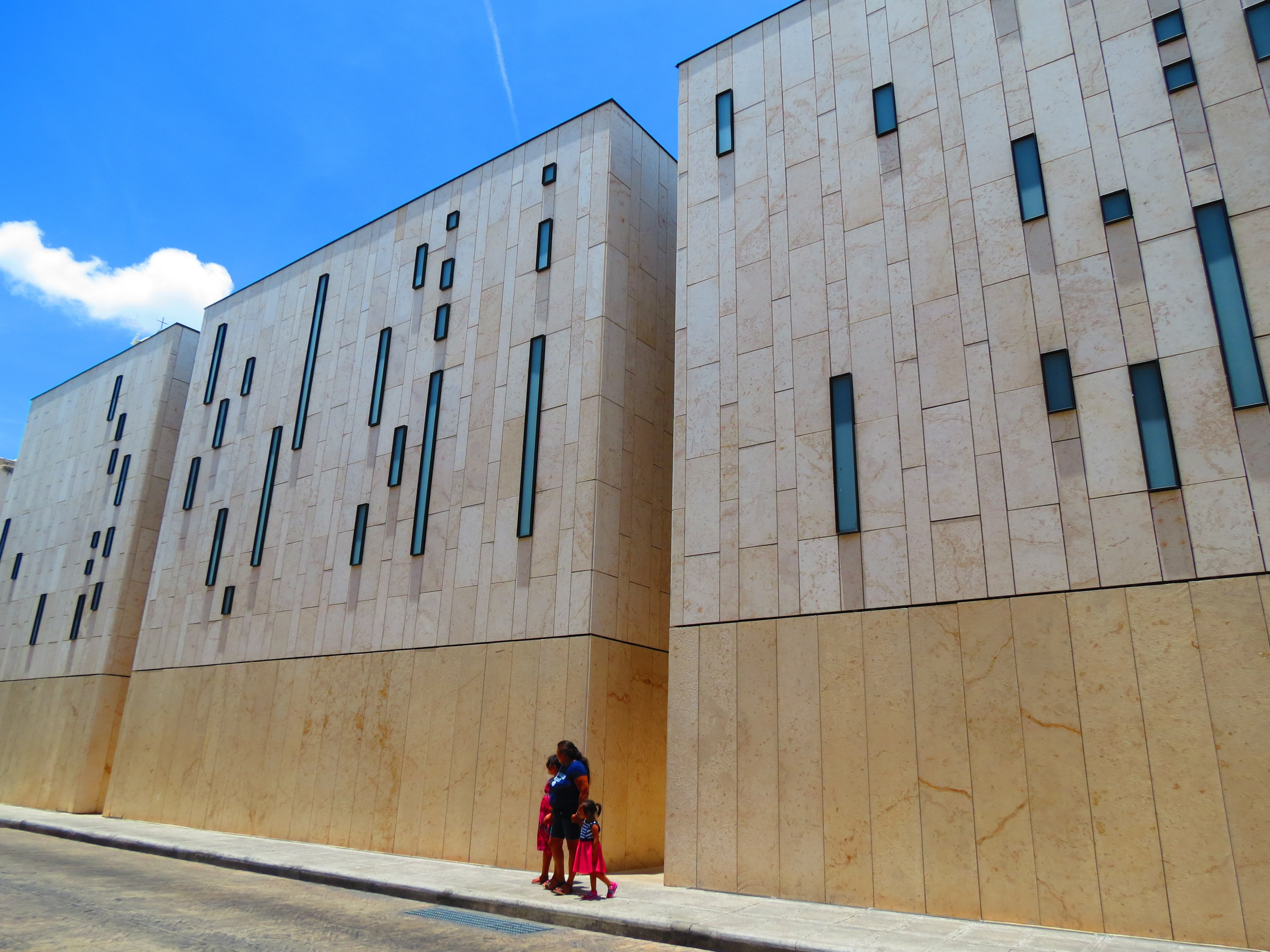
Palacio de la Música, completed in 2018 and the orchestra's home since 2023.

== See also ==
- List of symphony orchestras
- Universidad Autónoma de Yucatán
- Maya music
- Music of Mexico
