= Lomonaco =

Lomonaco is an Italian surname. Notable people with the surname include:

- Francesco Lomonaco (1772–1810), Italian writer
- Juan Carlos Lomonaco (born 1969), Mexican musician
- Kevin Lomonaco (born 2002), Argentine footballer
- Mark LoMonaco (born 1971), American wrestler better known as Bubba Ray Dudley
- Michael Lomonaco (born 1955), American chef, restaurateur, and television personality
- Samuel J. Lomonaco Jr. (born 1942), American academic and mathematician
- Sebastián Lomonaco (born 1998), Argentine footballer
- Tommaso Lomonaco (1901–1992), Italian scientist
