= Sky City Montecelio (Lazio) =

Città dell'Aria Montecelio (Italian pronunciation: [tʃitˌtadelˈlaːrja ˌmonteˈtʃeːljo]) was the name given by insiders in the 1930s to the area dedicated to Italian aeronautic research in the village of Montecelio, in the region of Lazio, near Rome.

In 1937 the village was renamed Guidonia Montecelio to honour Gen. Alessandro Guidoni, a pioneer of the Italian Air Force, who had died testing a new parachute. Sky City Montecelio was abandoned in 1943 due to heavy damage during World War II.

== History ==
In the 1920s the many aeronautic records attained by the Italian Air Force (ITAF) were a strong propaganda factor on the international scene; that is why in those years ITAF, a separate branch of the Armed Forces since March 28, 1923, invested heavily in R&D, promoting technological development in order to build up its own strength. To reach this goal, in 1926 many top-rank scientists were called to form the Directorate for Studies and Experiments (DSSE). To contribute to this new entity specialists were called from the four traditional sections of the Air Engineers Corps still existing today: i.e. engineers, geophysical experts, chemists and highly skilled technicians.

To locate its Center for Aeronautic Studies and Experiments, the DSSE chose the small village of Montecelio. According to its founder, Gen. G.A. Crocco, the center was to unite under the same roof all the different branches of aeronautic research existing at the time: radio communications, weaponry, technology, study of propellers, subsonic aerodynamics, optic science, photography, avionics. To the original structure were later attached new teams working on Aeronautic Medicine and Advanced Flight Tests, and even an Aeronautic Constructions Plant (SCA). The urban project was the work of renowned architects such as Giorgio Calza Bini, Gino Cancellotti and even an architect curator of St.Peter's Church in the Vatican City, Prof. Giuseppe Nicolosi.

On April 27, 1936, the Head of the Italian Government, the fascist leader Benito Mussolini, founded the “Città dell’aria” (Sky City) as the headquarters of DSSE. In 1937 the village was renamed Guidonia-Montecelio to honour Gen. Alessandro Guidoni, a pioneer of the Italian Air Force, who had died while testing a new parachute. “Guidonia became in those years a very secret agency working on flight safety and studying all the related branches of aeronautics down to supersonic flight, aircraft frame vibrations, critical speeds, etc., in order to define standards and requirements to be followed by the manufacturers of any type of aircraft. At the same time research continued on fuels, paints, special woods and plastic materials” (From a 1939 report by the Undersecretary of State for Defense, Gen. G.Valle)
