= Svetlin Roussev =

Bulgarian violinist

- Origin: Bulgaria
- Occupations: Violinist and professor
- Instrument: Violin

Svetlin Roussev is a Bulgarian-born violinist.

== Education ==
He was accepted to the Paris Conservatory at the age of 15, where he studied with Devy Erlih and Jean-Jacques Kantorow.

== Competition ==
He was the winner of the first Sendai International Music Competition in 2001.

== Career ==
Roussev has performed numerous violin concertos as soloist with Orchestre National de France, Orchestre Philharmonique de Radio France, Seoul Philharmonic Orchestra, Tokyo Philharmonic Orchestra, Indianapolis Symphony Orchestra, George Enescu Philharmonic Orchestra (Bucharest), National Radio Orchestra of Romania, Kremerata Baltica, Bulgarian National Radio Symphony Orchestra and others.

Roussev performed the Beethoven Kreutzer Sonata for violin and piano with Yeol Eum Son in 2020. Also included was the Beethoven "Spring" sonata for violin and piano No. 5 with the same pianist.

In June, 2019 Roussev performed the Beethoven Violin Concerto with the Sofia Philharmonic Orchestra conducted by Mark Kadin.

Roussev performed the Mendelssohn Violin Concerto with Nayden Todorov conducting the Sofia Philharmonic Orchestra on 20 October 2020.

Roussev has been the concertmaster of several prominent symphony orchestras, including the Seoul Philharmonic, L'Orchestre de la Suisse Romande, and Radio France Philharmonic Orchestra.

== Professorship ==
Since 2008, he has been a professor at the Geneva University of Music.

== Discography ==
- 2019: "Midnight Bells"
- 2015: "Fire & Ice: Sibelius & Vladigerov Violin Concertos
