= Cassino Courthouse =

Judiciary building in Cassino, Italy

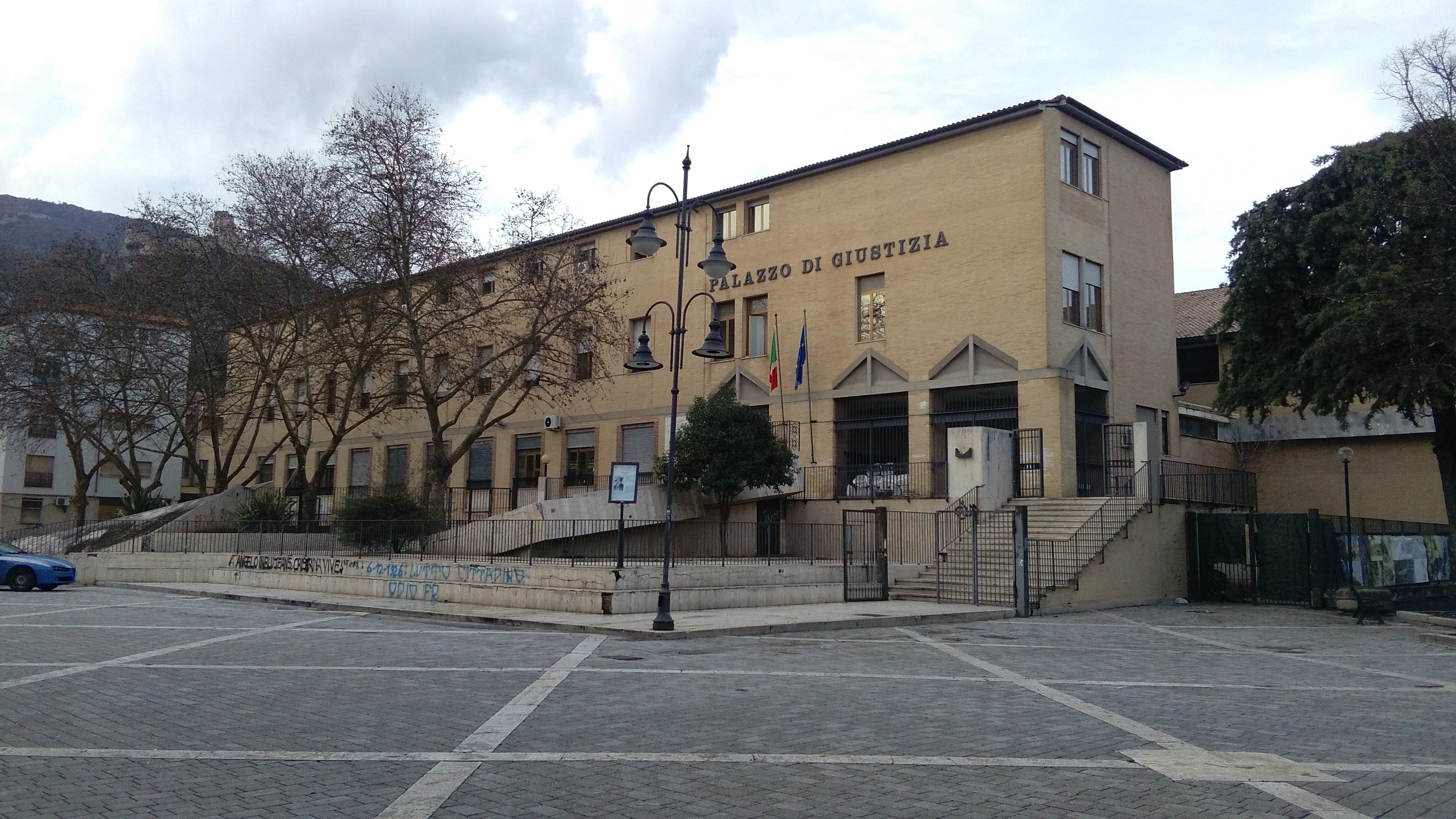
- Interactive map of the Cassino Courthouse area

General information
- Location: Cassino, Lazio, Italy
- Coordinates: 41°29′30.5″N 13°49′50.2″E
- Construction started: 1952
- Completed: 1969

Design and construction
- Architect: Giuseppe Nicolosi

The Cassino Courthouse (Italian: Palazzo di Giustizia di Cassino, lit. 'Palace of Justice of Cassino') is a judicial complex located on Piazza Labriola in Cassino, Italy.

== History ==
The construction of the courthouse was part of the broader post-war reconstruction plan following the extensive destruction caused by the 1944 bombings. The redevelopment of the city and public buildings was entrusted to prominent professionals, including engineer Giuseppe Nicolosi, who was responsible for designing the buildings surrounding the town's main square.

The original design envisioned a large structure organized around two symmetrical courtyards. However, during the 1950s, only the left wing was built, as the full project was considered oversized for the actual needs. In the early 1960s, increased demand for space led to an extension—again designed by Nicolosi—which introduced a large courtroom for the Court of Assizes, breaking the initial symmetry. To ensure formal consistency, the same brick cladding was applied to both the new and existing volumes. The complex was completed in 1969.

== Description ==
The building is defined by a sober, rational layout, reflecting Nicolosi's architectural approach. The facades, clad in exposed brick, feature a strict hierarchy of openings: small, evenly spaced windows just below the top cornice; regular office windows on the middle level; and full-height windows on the raised ground floor. These larger openings are set within brickwork panels where each architectural element—sill, base panel, lintel—is carefully expressed through variations in the brick pattern.

A continuous concrete band runs along the elevation, terminating at the corners in protruding pediments that mark the main entrances and emphasize the building's civic function.

== Sources ==
- Argenti, Maria; Rebecchini, Marcello (2002). "Giuseppe Nicolosi. Ultime opere: continuità e sintesi". Rassegna di architettura e urbanistica. No. 106–107–108. Rome. pp. 221–223.
- Cigola, Michele; Pelliccio, Assunta; Volante, Miriam; Mattei, Sara (2008). "L'opera a Cassino nel dopoguerra". In Paolo Belardi (ed.). Giuseppe Nicolosi (1901-1981). Architettura università città. Melfi: Librìa. pp. 109–121.
- Gallozzi, Arturo; Zordan, Marcello; Fragnoli, Franco (2017). "Un centro urbano ricostruito. Disegni dall'archivio di Giuseppe Nicolosi". Disegnare. No. 54. Rome. pp. 80–88.
