= Directorate for Studies and Experiments =

The Directorate for Studies and Experiments (Italian acronym DSSE) was an aeronautic tests centre established in the 1930s at Montecelio, near Rome. It took over the patrimony of experience gathered by the Italian Royal Airforce on the location since the end of World War I. In the 1920s the centre facilities already included a wind tunnel. Around the DSSE soon a new town developed, Guidonia. In the last years before the outbreak of World War II, DSSE grew into a world-known aeronautics testing ground. At the Directorate for Studies and Experiments there were many advanced facilities, such as one of the first wind tunnels, an ultrasonic tunnel, the weightlessness simulator called ‘pneumatic tank for high altitude’ and a centrifugal apparatus to study loss of orientation in space. Many of these tools were used by the Center for Studies and Research in Aeronautical Medicine research and anticipated more advanced technological equipment to be employed later In that field and Space activities at large. in Space Medicine. The more outstanding examples are the flight simulator provided with a cycle-ergonometer, the centrifugal device, the pressurized suit and the airtight cabin: these last two pieces of equipment were used by Mario Pezzi to attain his altitude records in the 1940s. DSSE was meant to become the only State Agency devoted to aeronautics research coordinating private firms too, such as Savoia-Marchetti, Caproni, Fiat, CANT and others, in order to avoid overlapping and attain maximum efficiency. DSSE collected as well foreign data on aeronautic matters and overlooked military and university research. The aim was to become a unique collector of experiences and information such as to promote the Italian Royal Airforce as world leader. That aim was only partly attained especially in airplane engine studies where DSSE myopia hampered the development of high performance power plants.

== Bibliography ==
- Filippo Graziani, La Scuola di Scuola Ingegneria Aerospaziale nell’ottantesimo anniversario della sua fondazione, Roma, luglio 2006
- Aeronautica Militare: Aeroporto A. Barbieri
