= Outhentic =

Bulgarian ethno jazz band

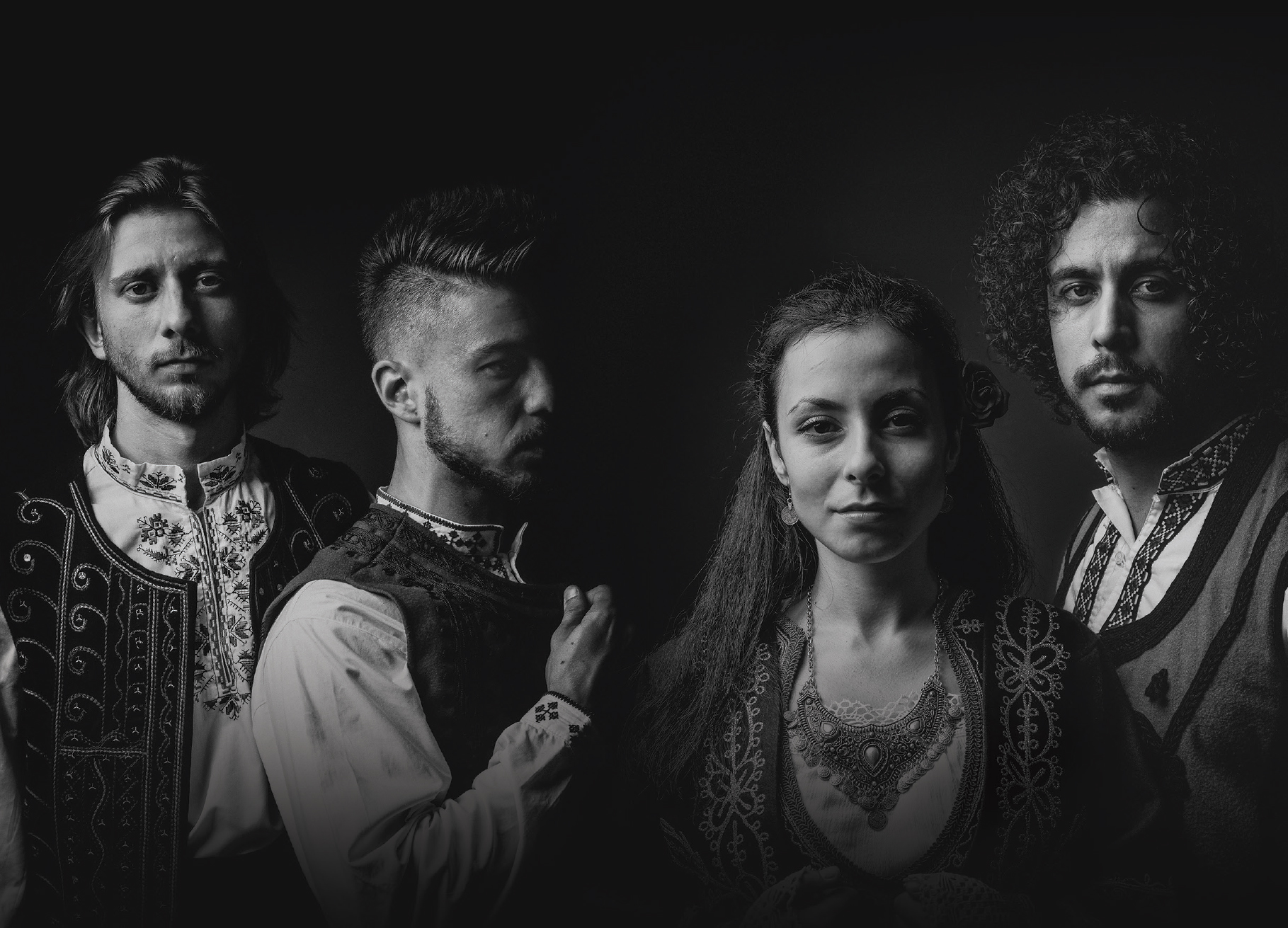
- Photo by: Martin Midolesov

Background information
- Origin: Bulgaria
- Genres: ethno jazz; jazz; folk; fusion; funk
- Years active: 2012–present
- Label: Outhentic
- Members: Zhivko Vasilev; Rayna Vasileva; Borislav Iliev; Stoil Ivanov
- Website: www.outhentic.eu

Outhentic is a Bulgarian ethno jazz band. The band consists of Zhivko Vasilev (kaval, piano), Rayna Vasileva (vocal, percussions), Borislav Iliev (guitar, tamboura), Stoil Ivanov (drums, tupan).

== Biography ==
The band was formed in 2012 by Zhivko Vasilev (kaval, piano) and Rayna Vasileva (vocal, percussion).

In 2018, Borislav Iliev (guitar) and Stoil Ivanov (drums), joined the group.

In band's biography, there are performances on various Bulgarian and international stages: Performance in the twelfth edition of the European Museum Night 2016 (Sliven, Bulgaria), Glastonbury Festival 2017 (England), etc.

Outhentic is a combination of the words: "out" and "authentic", which is in the meaning of "out of the authentic". Their style blends tastefully Balkan folk music, jazz and contemporary improvised music.

In 2016, the band released their first self-penned album, in which guest performers from all over the world are participating. The album is titled YesToday. In 2019, the band released their second album – Transparent.

At the end of 2017 Outhentic performed at the secret concerts of Sofar Sounds Sofia.

In 2018 they established an independent non-governmental organization incorporated for public benefit - Outhentic Foundation. It is focused on preserving, distributing and promoting world music and folklore, traditions both in Bulgaria and abroad. Its purpose is to advance the process of building spiritual values and enrichment of young people's musical culture.

In July 2019, they accomplished their project World Fest.

== Collaborations ==
Тhe band has collaborated with musicians and bands such as Juan Garcia-Herreros, Stoyan Yankoulov, etc.

== Discography ==
- YesToday (2016)
- Transparent (2019)
