= Center for Studies and Research in Aeronautical Medicine =

Italian aviation medicine organization

- Abbreviation: CSRAM
- Successor: Aeronautical and Space Medicine Unit
- Formation: 1937
- Dissolved: 1986
- Type: Government agency
- Purpose: Aviation medicine in Italy
- Location: Guidonia Montecelio, Italy
- Region served: Italy
- Members: Aviation medicine scientists
- Official language: Italian
- Parent organization: Italian Air Force

The Center for Studies and Research on Aeronautical Medicine (Italian: Centro Studi e Ricerche di Medicina Aeronautica, or CSRMA) was an aviation medicine organisation in Guidonia Montecelio, Italy.

== History ==
From 1937, alongside the Reparto Alta Quota at Guidonia, the center was given the task of studying the pathophysiology of the human body at high altitude. It took over structures at Montecelio that had been used by the Institute of Legal Medicine in Rome for aeromedical research, and updated its equipment by adding cycle-spirometers, respiratory gas-analysis apparatus, an anechoic chamber and a hypobaric chamber, and these were used to test tolerance at high altitudes.

In 1946 a new Nucleus for Studies and Research in Aeronautical Medicine was set up again, to become a Center once more in 1951; the unit, guided by Col. Tommaso Lo Monaco MD, resumed past experiences and was located at the Sapienza University of Rome near the Forensic Institute.

The center soon acquired an international standing, mostly because it developed and built a new pneumatic tank to simulate conditions of extremely low pressures and hypoxia, to train personnel in aerobatics. The Center could rely on very modern equipment to meet NATO standards, and in 1963 became the first and only Special School for Aeronautical and Spatial Medicine in Italy. Because of its relevance in the field of medicine, it was visited in 1965 by Col. John Glenn, USAF, the first US astronaut to orbit the Earth.

In 1986, the Center joined other units at Pratica di Mare Air Force Base.

== Structure ==
The center was attached to the Italian Air Force's (Italian: Aeronautica Militare) High Altitude Unit, with two branches at the University of Turin's Faculty of Medicine, Institute for Human Pathology, and at the Milan Catholic University's (Università Cattolica del Sacro Cuore) Laboratory of Experimental Psychology.

== Function ==
It had the aim of investigating the effects of high altitude, acceleration and depressurisation (uncontrolled decompression) on the human body and psyche.

There were anechoic chambers, machines to monitor a pilot breathing the same air over and over until hypoxia emerged, and a special tank to expose pilots to decompression and extremely low temperatures, built by ITAF technicians as far back as 1920. In the simulation of high altitude conditions, pilots were constantly monitored and diagnosed to control reactions: hypoxia, cramps, lack of concentration, sight problems, drowsiness or euphoria symptoms, mistakes in elementary calculating and writing operations, and loss of consciousness.

This research activity led in 1937 to the high altitude record (15,655 mt) in a piston-engined aircraft attained by Lt.Col. Mario Pezzi. In the attempt, he wore a pressurized suit, anticipating a number of features of the ones used by today's astronauts. In a second attempt, a year later, Pezzi reached an altitude of 17,083 mt in a pressurized, heated capsule very similar to modern space capsules. During World War II the Center suspended its researches due to heavy damage caused by allied bombing.
