= Giuseppe Nicolosi =

Italian architect (1901–1981)

- Born: 14 December 1901; Rome, Kingdom of Italy
- Died: 27 October 1981 (aged 79); Rome, Italy
- Education: Sapienza University of Rome
- Occupations: Civil engineer, architect, urban planner

Giuseppe Nicolosi (14 December 1901 – 27 October 1981) was an Italian engineer, architect and urban planner.

== Life and career ==
Giuseppe Nicolosi was born in Rome in 1901 into a culturally engaged and deeply religious family. He studied engineering and architecture, graduating in 1924. He began his academic career as an assistant to Gustavo Giovannoni and Arnaldo Foschini, from whom he learned a disciplined approach to architectural composition.

In the late 1920s, he began his professional practice, focusing primarily on social housing—a central theme throughout his career. He worked extensively with the ICP (Istituto Case Popolari), designing residential complexes in the Garbatella district and gradually transitioning from a simplified classicism to a more functionalist rationalism.

In 1931, Nicolosi joined the debate on modern architecture by aligning with RAMI (Raggruppamento Architetti Moderni Italiani), opposing the more radical positions of MIAR (Movimento Italiano per l'Architettura Razionale). During the 1930s and 1940s, he designed several new residential districts and master plans, including those for Montecelio, Latina, and the Roman neighborhoods of Tiburtino III and Trullo. In contrast to the Fascist regime's ruralist ideology, he embraced a return to classical urban form.

After World War II, Nicolosi collaborated with INA Casa, moving away from abstract rationalism in favor of a more material, site-sensitive architecture focused on constructional clarity. He played a key role in the postwar architectural development of Perugia, designing buildings that harmonized with the historic urban fabric. He took part in the reconstruction of Cassino, a city devastated by the conflict, designing numerous public spaces and buildings, including the courthouse.

In the 1950s and 1960s, he also concentrated on ecclesiastical architecture, with notable projects such as the churches of San Sabino in Spoleto, San Policarpo and Santa Maria Regina Mundi in Rome, and the Immacolata Concezione in Terni.

In addition to his professional practice, Nicolosi had a distinguished academic career. He began teaching in Rome in 1934, then in Bologna from 1936, and returned to Rome in 1951. He held chairs in Architectural Design and Composition, and from 1960 to 1964, in Architectural History. He also served as Director of the Institute of Architecture and Urban Planning within the Faculty of Engineering. He died in Rome in 1981.

== Sources ==
- Duranti, Giovanni (2013). "NICOLOSI, Giuseppe". Dizionario Biografico degli Italiani (in Italian). Vol. 78: Natta–Nurra. Rome: Istituto dell'Enciclopedia Italiana. ISBN 978-88-12-00032-6.
- Argenti, Maria; Rebecchini, Marcello (2002). "Giuseppe Nicolosi. Ultime opere: continuità e sintesi". Rassegna di architettura e urbanistica. No. 106–107–108. Rome.
- Paolo Belardi (ed.). Giuseppe Nicolosi (1901-1981). Architettura università città. Melfi: Librìa.
