= Emil Tabakov =

Bulgarian conductor and composer

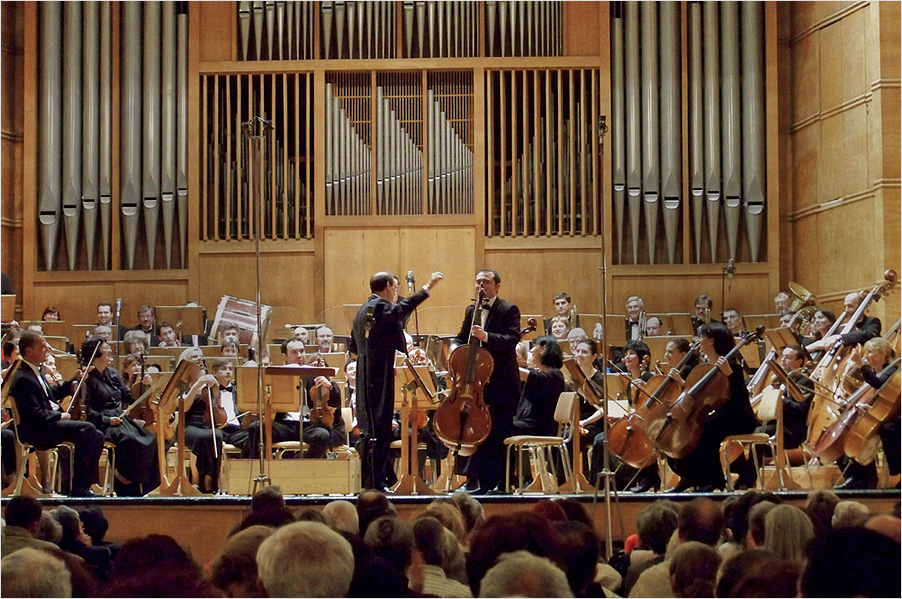
Emil Tabakov conducts the BRN Symphony Orchestra

Emil Tabakov (Bulgarian: Емил Табаков [ɛˈmiɫ tɐˈbakof]; born August 21, 1947) is a Bulgarian conductor, composer and double-bass player.

== Life and career ==
Emil Tabakov was born in Ruse, Bulgaria. In 1947 he studied at the Bulgarian State Music Academy with Todor Toshev, Marin Goleminov and Vladi Simeonov. He graduated with a diploma in conducting and double-bass in 1974 and in composition in 1978.

Tabakov's first engagement as a conductor was from 1976 to 1979 with the Rousse Philharmonic Orchestra. From 1979 to 1987 he served as music director and conductor of the Sofia Soloists Chamber Orchestra. He was appointed principal conductor of the Sofia Philharmonic Orchestra in 1987, and again served in this position from 1998 to 2000. From 1994 to 2000 he was artistic director and conductor of the Belgrade Philharmonic Orchestra. In 2014 he became the conductor of the Bulgarian National Radio Symphony Orchestra. In 1997 Tabakov served as Bulgarian minister of culture.

In 2018, Tabakov returned to conduct the Sofia Philharmonic Orchestra, starting with Gustav Mahler’s Symphony No. 8 during the orchestra’s season under artistic director Nayden Todorov.

Tabakov mainly composes for large ensembles, including symphonies and instrumental concertos. His works are recorded and available on media.

== Honors and awards ==
- Winner of the Nikolai Malko International Competition for Young Conductors in Copenhagen (1977)
- Musician of the Year of the Bulgarian National Radio (1992)
- "Crystal Lyre" (2009) Union of Musicians in Bulgaria.
- Nominated for "Man of the Year" (1992) by the International Bibliographic Centre in Cambridge, England

== Selected works ==
Selected works include:

Orchestral

- Symphony No. 1 (1981) (recorded on Balkanton 030077 and a second recording on Toccata Classics TOCC 0410)
- Symphony No. 2 (1984) (recorded on Toccata Classics TOCC 0562)
- Symphony No. 3 (1988) (recorded on Balkanton 030077)
- Symphony No. 4 (1997) (recorded on Toccata Classics TOCC 0467)
- Symphony No. 5 (2000) (recorded on Toccata Classics TOCC 0530)
- Symphony No. 6 (2001) (recorded on Toccata Classics TOCC 0562)
- Symphony No. 7 (2005) (recorded on Toccata Classics TOCC 0597)
- Symphony No. 8 (2010) (recorded on Toccata Classics TOCC 0365)
- Symphony No. 9 (2015) (recorded on Toccata Classics TOCC 0636)
- Symphony No. 10 (2018) (recorded on Toccata Classics TOCC 0695)
- Symphony No. 11 (2020)
- Astral Music (1978) (recorded on Balkanton 030077)
- Concert Piece (1985) (recorded on Toccata Classics TOCC 0467)
- Ad Infinitum (1992) (recorded on Gega New GD 358)
- Concerto for Orchestra (1995) (recorded on Gega New GD 102)
- Five Bulgarian Dances (2011) (recorded on Toccata Classics TOCC 0365)
- Adagio for String Orchestra (2016) (recorded on Toccata Classics TOCC 0695)

Concertante

- Concerto for 15 String Instruments (1979) (recorded on Elan CD 2230/Balkanton 030184 and a second recording on Toccata Classics TOCC 0636)
- Double-Bass Concerto (1975) (recorded on Toccata Classics TOCC 0530)
- Percussion Concerto (1976), commissioned by the percussion ensemble Poliritmia
- Concert Piece for trumpet and string orchestra (1985)
- Concerto for two flutes and orchestra (2000), written for Patrick Gallois (recorded on Naxos 8.570073)
- Piano Concerto (2003) (recorded on Naxos 8.570073)
- Concerto for cello and orchestra (2006) (recorded on Gega New GD 358)
- Concerto for viola and orchestra (2007) (recorded on Toccata Classics TOCC 0410)

Chamber music

- Sonata for viola and double bass (2005)
- Sonata for double bass and piano
- Etude (Етюд) for 12 double basses
- Lamento for 12 double basses (2002)
- Motivy (Мотиви) for double bass solo
- Motivy 2 (Мотиви 2) for double bass solo (2005)
- Prelude (Прелюд) for violin solo
- Improvisation (Импровизация) for clarinet solo
- Imagination (Въображения) for flute solo (2005)

Piano

- Sonatina

Choral

- Turnovgrad Cantata, for mezzo-soprano solo, 4 basses solo, narrator and orchestra (1976)
- Requiem, for 4 soloists, chorus and orchestra (1994)
- Concerto for Violin, Vibraphone, Marimba, Bells and Mixed Choir (1996), written for the famous Bulgarian violinist Mintcho Mintchev (recorded on Mega Music CD 20027)
