= Vratsa Symphony Orchestra =

Bulgarian state orchestra in Vratsa

Vratsa Symphony Orchestra (Bulgarian: Симфониета – Враца), also historically known as the Vratsa Philharmonic Orchestra and the State Philharmonic Orchestra – Vratsa, is a Bulgarian symphony orchestra based in Vratsa, northwestern Bulgaria.

== History ==
The orchestra's official history traces its roots to an opera orchestra established in Vratsa in 1909. The modern professional ensemble was founded in 1973 as the State Philharmonic Orchestra – Vratsa.

The creation of the professional orchestra is associated with Bulgarian conductor Radostveta Boyadzhieva, who served as founder and chief artistic director from 1973 until 1988.

Boyadzhieva was succeeded by Veselin Baychev, who was chief conductor and artistic director of the Vratsa Philharmonic Orchestra from 1988 to 1993. Dimitar Lilkov Panov, who had joined the orchestra in the 1970s, became conductor in 1977 and served as director of the orchestra from 1993 until 2017.

During the 1990s the orchestra was also associated with Nayden Todorov, who made his professional conducting debut with the Vratsa Philharmonic Orchestra in 1993 and began his first permanent appointment there in 1995. The bulgarian conductor Valeri Vachev also worked as principal conductor in Vratsa.

Since December 2017 the orchestra has been led by conductor, composer and flautist Hristo Pavlov.

== Artistic profile ==
Bulgarian music occupies a prominent place in the orchestra's programmes. The ensemble has appeared at Nova Balgarska Muzika with works by Bulgarian composers including Dimitar Hristov, Alexander Yossifov, Dimitar Kostantsaliev, Yuli Damyanov, Atanas Atanasov, Yordan Goshev, Petar Kerkelov, Georgi Kostov, Angel Dobrev and Sasho Mladenov.

In 2020 the orchestra received the Vechnata muzika award for Musical Event of the Year in the classical music category for a programme of premieres by Bulgarian composers.

The orchestra has presented new works not only by Bulgarian, but also by foreign composers. In 2025, during the Sofia Music Weeks International Festival, it presented a programme in the cycle The Bulgarian Instrumental Concerto, conducted by Nikola Petrov, which included premieres of works by Philip Pavlov, Fernando Morais and Tomasz Golinski.

In recent years the orchestra had attracted musicians from several continents and had developed measures to help young foreign players settle in the city - an activity, quite unusual for the region. The ensemble includes musicians from Bulgaria, Italy, Spain, Latvia, Russia, Ukraine, Albania, Japan, South Korea, the United States, Poland, the United Kingdom, Colombia, Venezuela, Denmark, Germany, Moldova and Azerbaijan among its recent staff.

Vratsa Symphony Orchestra has worked with guest conductors including Hector Guzman, Markus Huber, Matthias Manasi, Cristian Oroșanu, Viliana Valcheva, Rossen Gergov, Nayden Todorov, Grigor Palikarov, Konstantin Ilievsky, Vladimir Boshnakov, Georgi Andreev and Maxim Eshkenazy. Guest soloists of the orchestra include Nigel Kennedy, Bruno Canino, Fabio Armiliato, Alexander Zemtsov, Robert Lakatos, Mario Hossen, Liya Petrova, Alessandro Tomescu, Plamena Mangova, Emanuil Ivanov, Mark Drobinsky and Radek Baborák.

The orchestra hosts the Vratsa Conducting Summer Masterclass, a conductor-development programme involving full-orchestra rehearsals and performance opportunities.

== See also ==
- Vratsa
