= Vassil Kazandjiev =

Bulgarian composer (1934–2026)

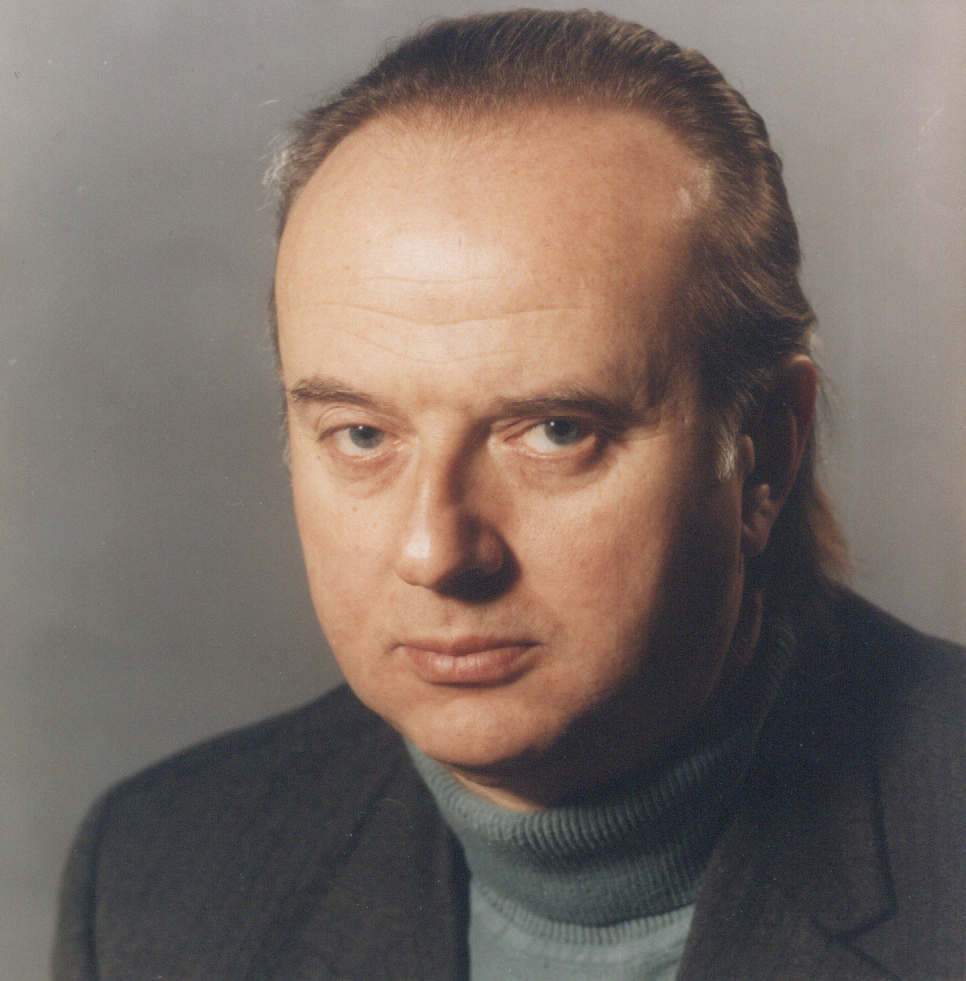
Undated portrait of Kazandjiev

Vassil Ivanov Kazandjiev or Vasil Ivanov Kazandzhiev (Bulgarian: Васил Иванов Казанджиев [vɐˈsiɫ kɐzɐnˈd͡ʒiɛf]; 10 September 1934 – 28 July 2026) was a Bulgarian composer of orchestral, chamber, vocal, film and piano music. His work was representative of the 20th-century classical music and 21st-century classical music.

== Life and career ==
Vassil Kazandjiev was born in Rousse, Bulgaria, on 10 September 1934. At the age of 7 he started playing the guitar and two years later he learned to play the piano. At the age of 10 he started composing music. His first teachers of composition and conducting were Konstantin Iliev and Dobrin Petkov. In 1957 Kazandjiev graduated from the Bulgarian State Music Academy in the composition class of Professor Pancho Vladigerov and conducting with Professor Vladi Simeonov. Already as a student at the Academy, he won a laureate’s prize for his Symphonietta for a large orchestra at the Sixth International Youth Festival in Moscow (1957 – chairman of the jury Dm. Shostakovich).

He started his career in conducting at the National Opera in Sofia, where he worked for seven years. During that period he staged and conducted a number of Bulgarian and foreign operas and ballets: Yana’s Nine Brothers and Antigona 43 by Lyubomir Pipkov, Sly Peter by Vesselin Stoyanov, The Boyana Master by Konstantin Iliev, Othello by Verdi, Turandot by Puccini, The Magic Flute by Mozart, Sleeping Beauty by Tchaikovsky, The Wooden Prince by Bartok and many more. In 1962 he founded the Sofia Soloists Chamber Ensemble with which he had very successful concerts in Bulgaria and abroad for 15 years. Since 1978 he was appointed conductor, and from 1985 until 1993 – Chief Conductor of the Bulgarian National Radio.

Kazandjiev combined high professionalism and broad musical culture, as well as a highly developed creative intuition. Therefore, his interpretations of works by different authors, styles and epochs were distinguished by depth, stylistic authenticity and pointed modern sensitivity. His art has been immortalised in many recordings of the Bulgarian Radio, Balkanton, Harmonia Mundi - France Kibaton – Japan and other companies from different countries. He has had extremely successful guest tours in almost every European country, United States, Canada, Africa, Japan, South Korea, etc.

In addition to being a conductor and pedagogue – he was professor of Orchestral Conducting at Pancho Vladigerov State Academy of Music. He was the author of a large number of symphony and chamber music works: five symphonies, a number of sonatas and instrumental concertos, “Pictures from Bulgaria”, “Live Icons”, “Apocalypse”, “Illuminations”, three string quartets, piano quintet, three trios, "Konzertstück" for 10 instruments etc. He also composed music for many theatre performances and films. His style was characterised by bright expressivity and artisticism, philosophical depth and a masterly composition technique.

After his graduation from the State Academy in Music in 1957 in the classes of composition of Pancho Vladigerov and conducting of Vladi Simeonov, Kazandjiev was active as conductor at the Sofia Opera, and since 1962 to 1978 as founder and director of the Sofia Soloists Chamber Ensemble, as well as director of the Symphony Orchestra of the Bulgarian National Radio (1979–1993). Since 1985 he was professor in conducting at the National Academy of Music (Bulgaria) and since 2009 he was elected Academician in the Bulgarian Academy of Sciences.

He realised numerous recordings in Asv Living, Balkanton, Capriccio, Capriole, Centaur, Cobra Entertainment LLC, Delta, Era, Gega new, labels. His overall activity contributed a lot for the propagation of contemporary music in Bulgaria and performances and recording of Bulgarian contemporary works of composers as Pancho Vladigerov, Georgi Tutev, Dimitar Nenov, Marin Goleminov, Georgi Minchev, Gheorghi Arnaoudov.

Kazandjiev composed six symphonies, and other works for symphony orchestra; music for chamber ensembles; theatre and film music; over 20 marches and military songs, transcriptions, etc.

Kazandjiev died in Sofia on 28 July 2026, at the age of 91.

== Works ==
=== Orchestral ===
- Concerto for Trumpet (1955)
- Concerto for Piano and Saxophone (1957)
- Divertimento for orchestra (1957)
- Symphony №1 Symphony of Hymns (1959)
- Concerto for Violin and orchestra (1962)
- September 23 heroic overture (1963)
- Symphony of Timbres for string orchestra (1963)
- Living Icons (1970)
- Pictures from Bulgaria for string orchestra (1971)
- Apocalypse for orchestra (1973)
- Capriccio for orchestra (1979)
- Illuminations for orchestra (1980)
- Symphony N 3 In Memory of My Father for orchestra (1983)
- Affreschi Sacri for orchestra (1993)
- Symphony N 4 "Nirvana" for orchestra (2000)
- Symphony N 5 Lux Aeterna for orchestra (2006)

=== Chamber music ===
- Wind quintet (1951)
- Perspectives - String Quartet N 1 (1966)
- String Quartet N 2 (1970 - 1972)
- Sonata for solo cello (1976)
- Strophes for flute, violin and piano (1976)
- Episodes for clarinet, harp and percussion (1977)
- Reflections for flute and piano (1979)
- Impulses for wind trio (1980)
- Meditation for violin and piano (1982)
- Piano quintet (1982)
- Mirages for violin, clarinet, cello and piano (1997)
- Reflections two cellos (1998)
- Sonata for violin and cello (1998)
- String Quartet N 3 (2000)
- String Quartet N 4 (2010)

=== Piano music ===
- Toccata (1957)
- Sonata (1958)
- Triomphe des carillons (1974)
- Equilibristics (1979)

=== Film music ===
- Tyutyun dir. Nikola Korabov (1962)
- Valchitsata dir. Rangel Vulchanov (1965)
- Shibil dir. Zahari Zhandov (1968)
- Tatul dir. Atanas Traykov (1972)
- Boyanskiyat maystor dir. Zahari Zhandov (1981)

== Sources ==
- Bojikova, Milena 1999. Vassil Kazandjiev Sofia, Institute of Art Studies, 1999, 440 pp. ISBN 954-90447-1-8
