= Juan Carlos Lomonaco =

- Born: 1969 (age 55–56)
- Occupation(s): Music director, conductor

Juan Carlos Lomonaco (born 1969) is a Music Director and a former Conductor of the Yucatán Symphony Orchestra, in Mérida, Yucatán, Mexico.

The repertory and versatility of Lomonaco's conducting covers diverse areas such as opera (Carmen, Traviata, Rigoletto, Boheme, Samson and Dalilah, Barber of Seville, Elixir of love) ballet (The Nutcracker, Cinderella, Onegin, Carmina Burana, Don Quixote), symphonic music, chamber music, and multimedia performances.

Many pre-eminent soloists have performed under his baton, such as, tenor Juan Diego Florez, Alexei Volodin, Erika Dobosiewicz, Vadim Brodsky, Jorge Federico Osorio, Carlos Prieto, tenor Fernando de la Mora, Cuarteto Latinoamericano, and the French multimedia group Art Zoyd.

== Education ==
Lomonaco graduated from The Curtis Institute of Music, where he studied orchestra conducting with Otto-Werner Muller. He also studied with Charles Bruck at The Pierre Monteux School, Enrique Diemecke and Marc David.

He has participated in diverse international forums and festivals, such as the Festival Lírico Internacional de San Lorenzo de El Escorial, Spain; the Contemporary Music Festival of Treviso, Italy; Cervantino International Festival, Mexico City International Festival, just to name a few. As well, he has been juror in different violin competitions in Hungary, France and Turkey: "The Canetti International Violin Competition"

== Career ==
Since age 17, he has participated in and conducted various music ensembles and at the age of 23 he made his debut with The National Symphony Orchestra of Mexico, where he remained as Assistant Conductor for two years. Lomonaco has been music director of the Carlos Chavez Symphony, IPN Symphony, National Conservatory Symphony, the Ollin Yoliztli Symphony in Mexico and The Mexico-Philadelphia Ensemble, in the USA. In 1994, Lomonaco was Assistant Conductor at The Domaine Forget Academy of Music in Canada. He is founder and conductor of the chamber orchestra Ensamble Iberoamericano in Madrid.

Lomonaco made his European debut with the Orchestra Filarmonia Veneta in Italy in October 2002. He has performed as guest conductor with the following international orchestras: Polish Chamber, Radom Orchestra in Poland, Simon Bolivar Symphony in Venezuela, Vojvodina Symphony in Serbia, Gaia Philharmonic in Portugal, National Symphony of Peru, Lima Philharmonic, Youth Symphony of Ecuador. In the United States he has conducted Salt Lake Symphony, Longy Symphony, Garland Symphony, Arlington Symphony and Las Colinas Symphony. In his native country of Mexico he conducts regularly the National Symphony of Mexico, Mexico City Philharmonic, Opera Theatre Orchestra of Fine Arts, UNAM Philharmonic, Fine Arts Chamber Orchestra, Querétaro Philharmonic and Chamber, Guanajuato Symphony, Jalapa Symphony, Aguascalientes Symphony, Nuevo León Symphony and Coahuila Chamber, among others.

Over twelve recordings with the National Symphony of Mexico, UNAM Philharmonic and Carlos Chavez Symphony are musical testimony of the most outstanding Mexican composers of the 20th and 21st century: La Mulata de Córdoba (2007), Academy of Arts and National Symphony (2003 - 2010), Música Mexicana with OFUNAM Philharmonic (2010). He also has recorded chamber music from contemporary composers.

He has received several distinguishing scholarships from Mexico's National Council of Culture and Arts (FONCA) and The Presser Music Award from The Curtis Institute of Music.

In 2010, he was selected by the magazine Mexican Leaders as one of the 300 most influential leaders in Mexico.

Lomonaco's concerts as guest conductor for the season 2013 - 2014 are with Gaia Philharmonic in Portugal, the Opera "Der Kaiser von Atlantis" at the Cervantino International Festival, Krasnoyarsk Symphony in Russia, Academy Arts Concert with the National Symphony of Mexico, Ballet The Nutcracker at the National Auditorium with the National Dance Company, Radom Orchestra in Poland, Gaeta International Festival in Italy and UNAM Philharmonic.
