= Mark Kadin =

Russian conductor and musical director (born 1965)

- Марк Львович Кадин
- Born: April 28, 1965 (age 60); Kramatorsk, Ukraine
- Occupation: Conductor
- Years active: 2003–present
- Website: https://www.markkadin.com/

Mark L'vovich Kadin (Russian: Марк Львович Кадин; born April 28, 1965) is a Russian conductor and musical director of Soviet origin.

Kadin has been the conductor of the Bulgarian National Radio Symphony Orchestra since 2017.
