= Alexei Volodin =

Russian pianist

Alexei Volodin (Russian: Алексей Володин; born 1977) is a Russian pianist.

Volodin began taking piano lessons in St. Petersburg at the age of nine. A year later he moved to Moscow, where he studied first with Irina Chaklina and later with Tatiana Zelikman at the Gnessin Music School.He graduated from Moscow Conservatory, where he studied with Prof. Eliso Virsaladze. In 2003, Volodin won 1st prize at Géza Anda International Piano Competition. Volodin gave recitals all over the world, and has performed with prestigious orchestras.

== Discography ==
- Sergei Rachmaninov - Piano Works
- Miroirs
- Frederic Chopin - Piano works
- Beethoven: Sonatas op. 109, E-dur & op. 106, B-dur ("für das Hammerklavier")
- Beethoven: Sonata c-moll op. 111; Rachmaninov: 6 Moments musicaux op. 16; Prokofiev: Sonata no. 7 op. 83
- TCHAIKOVSKY; STRAVINSKY
