= Tommaso Lomonaco =

- Born: 1901; Rome, Italy
- Died: 1992 (aged 91)
- Awards: Euno (1993)
- Scientific career
- Fields: Aerospace sciences

Tommaso Lomonaco (1901–1992), one of the so-called guidonians, in the 1940s was strongly in favour of a multi-disciplinary approach to space sciences. He believed that aeronautical engineering and medicine were closely related and even more in the case of astronautics. He illustrated his experience on the interaction between the two sciences in a book, An MD Among Flyers. There, he states that both in the Guidonia labs and in the Aeronautic Engineering School, 'technicians, engineers, medicine doctors, biologists, university students and ITAF career officers worked side by side, merging their knowledge in a completely new way for those times'.

== Bibliography ==
- Filippo Graziani, La Scuola di Scuola Ingegneria Aerospaziale nell’ottantesimo anniversario della sua fondazione 2006
- Tommaso Lo Monaco, Un medico tra gli aviatori, Regionale Editrice
- Brief biography of Tommaso Lomonaco (in Italian)
