= Sofia Soloists Chamber Orchestra =

The Sofia Soloists Chamber Orchestra (SSCO) is a chamber music ensemble based in Sofia, Bulgaria.

== History ==
SSCO was established in 1962 by a group of young musicians from the Sofia National Opera. Their first concert, conducted by Michail Angelov, attracted the attention of audiences and critics in Sofia, and the ensemble soon began concert activity and international tours.

In its first decades the ensemble developed under a succession of Bulgarian conductors who shaped its artistic profile. The principal conductors and artistic leaders of the orchestra have included Vassil Kazandjiev (1964–1978), Emil Tabakov (1979–1988), Plamen Djouroff (1988–2022), Konstantin Dobroykov (2022–2025), and Lyubomir Denev Jr., who became conductor of the ensemble from the 2025–2026 season.

By the early twenty-first century, SSCO had performed more than 3,500 concerts worldwide. The ensemble has appeared at festivals and venues in Europe, North and South America, Asia and Australia, including performances in Germany, France, Spain, Croatia, Italy, Belgium, Norway, the United States, Japan, South Korea, China, India, Australia and other countries.

The orchestra's repertoire includes more than 600 works, ranging from Baroque music to contemporary repertoire. It has premiered more than 100 works, many of them written especially for the ensemble.

== Collaborations ==
The Sofia Soloists have worked with a broad range of soloists and conductors, including Henryk Szeryng, Daniil Shafran, Nicanor Zabaleta, Emmanuel Pahud, Nigel Kennedy, Heinz Holliger, Patrick Gallois, Albrecht Breuninger, David Walter, Carlos Barbosa-Lima, Sergei Nakariakov, Radek Baborák, Mila Georgieva, Emanuil Ivanov, Nayden Todorov, Dejan Gavrić, Petko Radev, Mincho Minchev, Milena Mollova, Anatoli Krastev, Georgi Badev and Dina Schneiderman.

In recent seasons, the ensemble has appeared with artists such as Emanuil Ivanov and Radek Baborák, and has continued to programme both standard chamber orchestra repertoire and works by Bulgarian composers.

== Recordings ==
The orchestra has made more than 60 recordings for labels including Sony Classical-BMG, Harmonia Mundi, Columbia, Denon, Decca, Centaur Records, SABA, Victor and Gega New.

In 2003, the Sofia Soloists recorded the album Bulgarian Soul with Bulgarian mezzo-soprano Vesselina Kasarova for Sony Classical-BMG. The recording received the ECHO Klassik award.

The ensemble's discography also includes recordings with performers such as Mincho Minchev, Georgi Badev, Anatoli Krastev and others, including Bulgarian and European chamber-orchestra repertoire.
