= Varna Opera Theatre =

Varna Opera
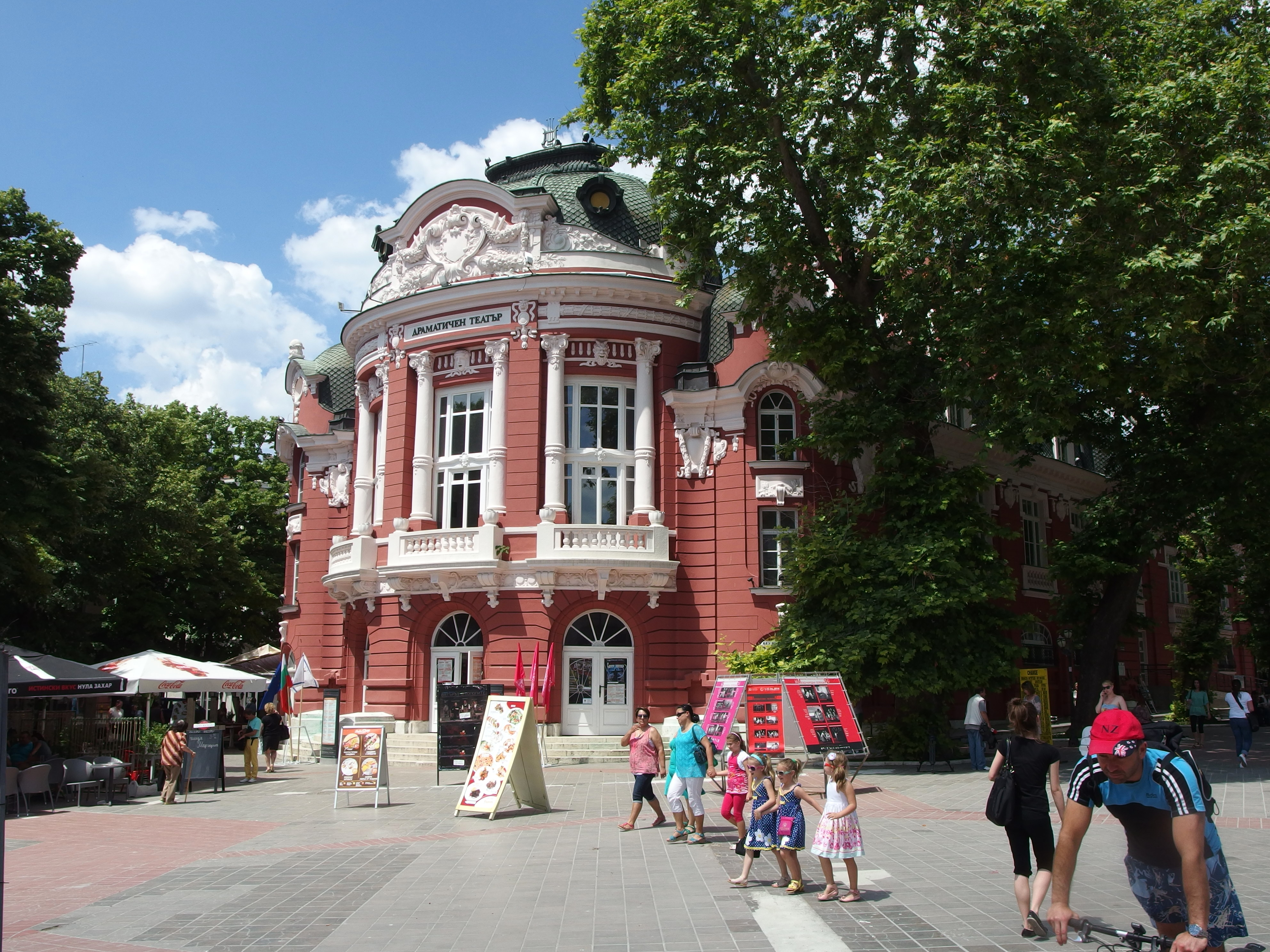
- The edifice of Varna Opera and Theatre

- Location within Bulgaria

General information
- Status: Completed
- Location: Varna, Bulgaria, Bulgaria
- Coordinates: 43°12′13″N 27°54′43″E

Design and construction
- Architect: Nikola Lazarov

The Varna Opera (Bulgarian: Варненската опера) is an opera house in Varna, Bulgaria. It is part of the Opera and Philharmonic Society of Varna, founded by a merger of the Opera House and Philharmonic Society in 1999. The theatre itself originally opened in 1947.

== History ==
The history of the theatre, currently known as the Varna Opera Theater, dates back to 1912 when the foundation was laid for the theatre. Its creation was temporarily delayed due to the coming Balkan Wars. After the wars ended, the theatre was inaugurated in 1932.

The basis of the future Varna Opera consisted of an opera troupe and a symphonic orchestra founded on 1 April 1946. The institution was officially registered as the Varna Public Opera House on 6 April 1947 and officially opened on 1 August of the same year.

Stefan Nikolaev was appointed as the theatre's first director and the distinguished Bulgarian tenor Petar Raychev became its first artistic director.

An orchestra, choir and ballet troupe were formed under the leadership of the young conductor Ruslan Raychev, choir-master Dimitar Mladenov and choreographer Assen Manolov. The company prepared its first production, The Bartered Bride by Bedřich Smetana, within less than a month.

In its first two seasons alone, the theatre staged more than ten productions, including Madama Butterfly, Cavalleria Rusticana, La traviata, Tosca and La bohème.

Over the decades, the Varna Opera developed into one of Bulgaria's major operatic institutions, producing more than 200 stage productions and nearly 7,000 performances attended by over three million spectators.

The repertoire includes works from the eighteenth to the twenty-first century, encompassing opera, ballet, operetta and musical theatre.

== Orchestra ==
The history of the Varna Philharmonic Orchestra began in 1913, when an amateur symphony orchestra was founded.

In 1926, under the direction of Assen Naidenov, the orchestra participated successfully in the first Summer Music Festival in Varna, which later developed into the Varna Summer International Music Festival.

On 1 April 1946, initiated by conductor and violinist Prof. Sasha Popov, the Varna State Symphony Orchestra was established, becoming the State Philharmonic in 1968.

The orchestra has participated in major Bulgarian music festivals and toured internationally in Germany, the Czech Republic, Slovakia, France, Russia, Poland, Austria, Spain, Italy, Greece, India, Egypt, Switzerland and Romania.

The ensemble has also made numerous recordings for Bulgarian National Radio and Bulgarian National Television.

=== Principal conductors and artistic leadership ===
Among the conductors who contributed to the artistic development of the orchestra and opera were Ruslan Raychev, Vasil Stefanov, Yosko Yosifov, Konstantin Iliev, Emil Glavanakov, Vladi Anastasov, Ivan Marinov, Stanislav Ushev and Yordan Dafov.

Bulgarian conductor Pavel Baleff has also served as principal guest conductor of the Varna State Opera.

Guest conductors of the institution have included Grigor Palikarov, who has appeared regularly with the company.

== Opera in the Summer Theatre ==
Since 2010, the Varna State Opera has organized the annual festival Opera in the Summer Theatre (Bulgarian: Опера в Летния театър), held at the open-air Summer Theatre of Varna in cooperation with the Varna Summer International Music Festival.

The festival presents opera, ballet, operetta and musical theatre productions featuring Bulgarian and international artists.

The festival has featured appearances by internationally recognized performers including Agunda Kulaeva, Kaludi Kaludov, Kamen Chanev, and Krassimira Stoyanova.

== Notable productions and guest artists ==
Over the decades, the Varna State Opera has presented numerous large-scale opera and ballet productions featuring prominent Bulgarian and international artists.

In 2011, the company presented Carl Orff's Carmina Burana and Catulli Carmina in an international festival production conducted by Nayden Todorov and directed by Swedish stage director Marianne Berglöf.

The production involved an international creative team including costume designer Katrin Rölle and scenographer Andrey von Schlippe.

The opera Rusalka by Antonín Dvořák was staged by the company for the first time in Bulgaria.

Several productions were presented as Bulgarian or Varna premieres, including the musical Singin' in the Rain, staged for the first time in Bulgaria, and the operas La Gioconda and Cinderella, presented for the first time in Varna.

Guest artists appearing with the company over the years have included Krassimira Stoyanova, Kamen Chanev, Kaludi Kaludov, Svetla Vassileva, and Boiko Tsvetanov.

In April 2026, the Varna State Opera organized an opera gala featuring Plácido Domingo, conducted by Nayden Todorov, with the Orchestra of the Varna State Opera performing at the Palace of Culture and Sports in Varna.
