= Georgi Minchev (composer) =

Bulgarian composer

Georgi Minchev (Bulgarian: Георги Минчев) is a Bulgarian composer born on January 29, 1939, in Sofia, Bulgaria.

== Education ==
Minchev is a graduate of the Bulgarian State Conservatoire in Prof. Marin Goleminov's composition class. Between 1968 and 1970 he majored under Rodion Shchedrin in Moscow and for several months he studied simultaneously under Aram Khachaturian. In 1972 he received a UNESCO music fellowship to further his education in the USA, Great Britain and France. At the Conservatoire de Paris he attended the composition class of Olivier Messiaen.

== Career and awards ==
He has worked as editor-in-chief of music production at the Bulgarian National Radio, as Deputy Chairman and Secretary General of the Union of Bulgarian Composers, and as artistic director at the Bulgarian National Radio.

He has been on the jury of many international competitions: Let the Peoples Sing (London); International Composition Competition (Terni, Italy); Premio Vittorio Gui (Florence, Italy); Premio Ancona (Ancona, Italy); International Composition Competition (Berlin, Germany); Olympia International Composition Competition (Athens, Greece); S. Prokofiev International Composition Competition (Moscow).

Georgi Minchev has been awarded the highest national and a number of international prizes. His Piano Concerto was selected by the International Record Critics Award in USA in 1979 and was the first among the works recommended by the International Composer's Rostrum in Paris in 1981. In 1989 Georgi Mintchev was honoured as Senatore Accademico and was awarded the Lorenzo Magnifico European Prize of the Accademia Internationale Medicea in Florence.

He was awarded the Grand Prize of the Bulgarian National Radio for Achievement and a "Golden Century" - the highest award of the Ministry of Culture.

In 2015, he was elected "Academician" - a Full Member of the Bulgarian Academy of Sciences.

He has been on the jury of many international competitions: London - Let the Peoples Sing, Terni (Italy) - International Composition Competition, Florence (Italy) - Premio Vittorio Gui, Ancona (Italy) - Premio Ancona, Berlin (Germany) - International Composition Competition, Athens (Greece), Olympia International Composition Competition, Moscow - 'S.Prokofiev International Composition Competition.

His works have been performed in Bulgaria, France, Germany, Italy, Switzerland, Russia, Poland, the Czech Republic, Slovakia, Cuba, Columbia, Australia, Greece, Belgium, Austria, San Marino, USA, the Netherlands, Spain, Japan, Great Britain and Finland.

He is member of SUISA (Switzerland) and MUSICAUTOR (Bulgaria).

== Selected works ==
Minchev's compositions are mainly published by Sovetsky Kompozitor, Edition BIM.

Stage

- Fahrenheit 451 (Фаренхайт 451), ballet (1993–1996); after the novel by Ray Bradbury

Orchestral

- Intermezzo and Aquarelle (Интермецо и акварел) for 2 flutes, harpsichord and 13 string instruments (1970)
- Concert Music (Концертна музика) (1976)
- Prologue Symphonique (Симфоничен пролог) (1981)
- Dynamic Spaces (Динамични пространства) (1991)
- Contrasts (Контрасти), Music for orchestra (2002)

Concertante

- Concerto for piano and orchestra (1978)
- Senti Metal, Concerto for cello and orchestra (1993)
- Monodia and Concerto Grosso for viola, harpsichord, percussion and string orchestra (2006)

Chamber music

- Concerto Breve I for 10 instruments (1984)
- Concerto Breve II "ContempoRetro" for brass quintet (1993)
- Monodia II for viola or cello solo (2006)

Piano

- Sonograms (Сонограми), 5 Concert Reminiscences (1980)

Choral

- Old Church Chronicles (Староългаски хроники), Oratorio for mezzo-soprano, bass, mixed chorus, female folk chorus, narrator and orchestra (1971)
- Prayers (Молитви) for mixed chorus a cappella (1997)

Vocal

- 3 Poems (Три поеми) for mezzo-soprano and orchestra (1973)
- Frescos (Фрески), Song Cycle for soprano, piano and bells (1983)
- 3 Poems (Три поеми) for soprano, string orchestra and percussion (1983)
- Drop, Drop, Slow Tears for soprano and piano (1998); words by Phineas Fletcher (1582–1650)
