= Bulgarian National Radio Symphony Orchestra =

Orchestra

- Radio orchestra
- Native name: Симфоничен оркестър на Българското национално радио
- Founded: 1948; 78 years ago
- Location: Sofia, Bulgaria
- Concert hall: Bulgaria Concert Hall
- Principal conductor: Konstantin Ilievsky
- Website: Official website

The Bulgarian National Radio Symphony Orchestra (Bulgarian: Симфоничен оркестър на Българското национално радио) is a Bulgarian radio orchestra based in Sofia, Bulgaria, affiliated with Bulgarian National Radio. It gives concerts in the Bulgaria Concert Hall.

== History ==
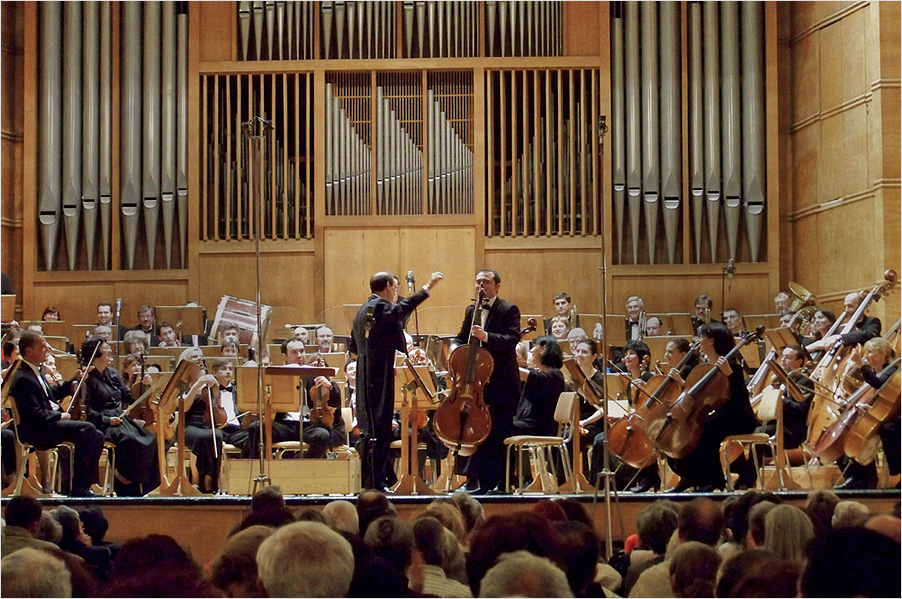
Emil Tabakov conducts the BRN Symphony Orchestra, 2010

Founded in 1948, the orchestra's first chief conductor was Vassil Stefanov, who remained affiliated with the orchestra from 1948 to 1988. Other conductors affiliated with the orchestra have included Vladimir Simeonov, Alexander Vladigerov, Vassil Kazandjiev, and Milen Nachev. The orchestra's current chief conductor is Emil Tabakov, since 2008. He is scheduled to conclude his chief conductorship of the orchestra in December 2015. In December 2015, the orchestra announced the appointment of Rossen Gergov as its next chief conductor, effective in January 2016.

The orchestra offers a full annual schedule of events, tours internationally and maintains a large discography of recordings. Notable people in building the orchestra over the years include Vassil Stefanov, Vladimir Simeonov, Michail Angelov, Vassil Kazandjiev, Alexander Vladigerov, Milen Nachev and Rossen Milanov.

A central part of the mission of the Bulgarian National Radio Symphony Orchestra has been the preservation, performance and recording of Bulgarian symphonic music, with a particular focus on documenting the works of leading Bulgarian composers for future generations.

Among the orchestra's major recording projects is the complete recording of the piano concertos of Pancho Vladigerov, performed by pianist Ludmil Angelov with the Bulgarian National Radio Symphony Orchestra under conductor Nayden Todorov. Bulgarian National Radio described the project as part of its efforts to preserve and promote Bulgaria's musical heritage.

The orchestra has also recorded symphonic and orchestral works by prominent Bulgarian composers including Marin Goleminov, Lyubomir Pipkov, Krasimir Kyurkchiyski, Emil Tabakov, Georgi Minchev and others through the archives and productions of Bulgarian National Radio.

Particularly notable are the orchestra's recordings of symphonies by Bulgarian composer and conductor Emil Tabakov, several of which were released internationally by the British label Toccata Classics.

Recordings by the orchestra have been released internationally by labels including Naxos, Balkanton, Gega New, Toccata Classics and other European labels, contributing to the international dissemination of Bulgarian orchestral music.

== Chief conductors ==
- Vassil Stefanov (1948–1988)
- Alexander Vladigerov (1969–1991)
- Vassil Kazandjiev (1979–1993)
- Milen Nachev (1994–2003)
- Rossen Milanov (2003–2008)
- Emil Tabakov (2008–2015)
- Rossen Gergov (2015–2016)
- Mark Kadin (2016–present)
