= Johansen Islands =

Island group in Antarctica

- Location within Antarctica

Geography
- Location: Antarctica
- Coordinates: 69°3′S 72°52′W

Administration
- Administered under the Antarctic Treaty System

Demographics
- Population: Uninhabited

The Johansen Islands are a group of small, low, partly snow-free islands lying within Lazarev Bay and Wilkins Sound, 22 kilometres (12 nmi) west-northwest of Cape Vostok, at the northwest end of Alexander Island, Antarctica. They were discovered from the USS Bear on its initial approach to establish the East Base of the United States Antarctic Service in 1940, and were named for Bendik Johansen, the ice pilot for the expedition, who served in a similar capacity on the Byrd Antarctic Expeditions of 1928–30 and 1933–35.

== See also ==
- List of Antarctic and sub-Antarctic islands
- Dint Island
- Merger Island
- Umber Island
