= St. Theodosius Nunatak =

Nunatak on Alexander Island, Antarctica

Location of Alexander Island in the Antarctic Peninsula region

Satellite image of Alexander Island

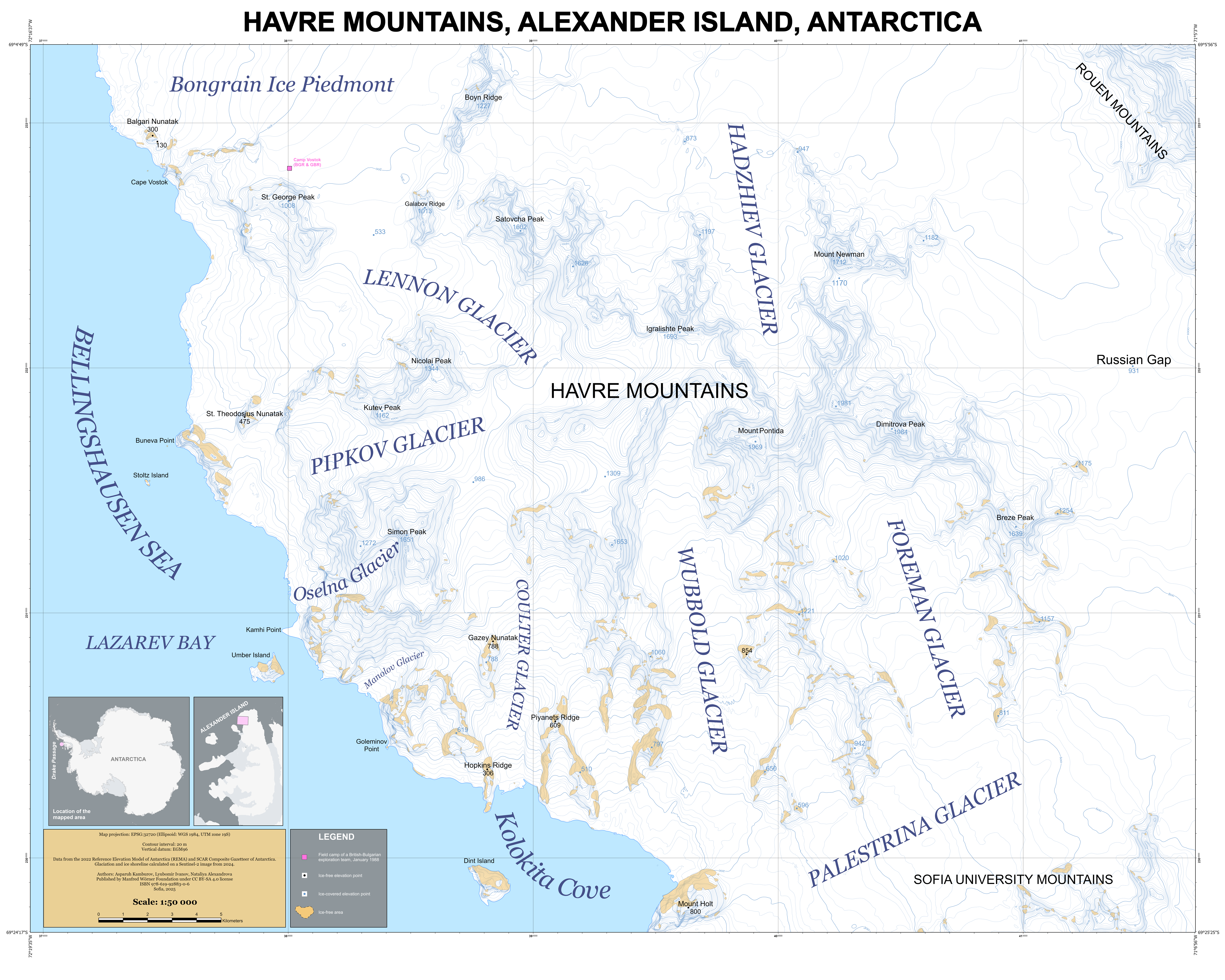
Map of Havre Mountains, Alexander Island in Antarctica

St. Theodosius Nunatak (Bulgarian: нунатак Св. Теодосий, ‘Nunatak Sv. Teodosiy’ \'nu-na-tak sve-'ti te-o-'do-siy\) is the mostly ice-free ridge extending 1.9 km in northeast-southwest direction and 1 km wide, rising to 430 m on the west side of Havre Mountains in northern Alexander Island, Antarctica. It surmounts Lennon Glacier to the north and Pipkov Glacier to the south-southeast.

The feature is named after the Bulgarian cleric and hermit St. Theodosius of Tarnovo (1300-1363), in connection with the settlement of Teodosievo in Northern Bulgaria.

== Location ==
St. Theodosius Nunatak is located at 69°13′13″S 72°04′36″W, which is 3.13 km east-northeast of Buneva Point, 8.86 km south-southwest of Saint George Peak, 5.6 km west of Kutev Peak and 8.4 km northwest of Simon Peak. British mapping in 1991.

== Maps ==
- British Antarctic Territory. Scale 1:250000 topographic map. Sheet SR19-20/5. APC UK, 1991
- Antarctic Digital Database (ADD). Scale 1:250000 topographic map of Antarctica. Scientific Committee on Antarctic Research (SCAR). Since 1993, regularly upgraded and updated
