= Goleminov Point =

Antarctic geological feature

Location of Alexander Island in the Antarctic Peninsula region

Satellite image of Alexander Island

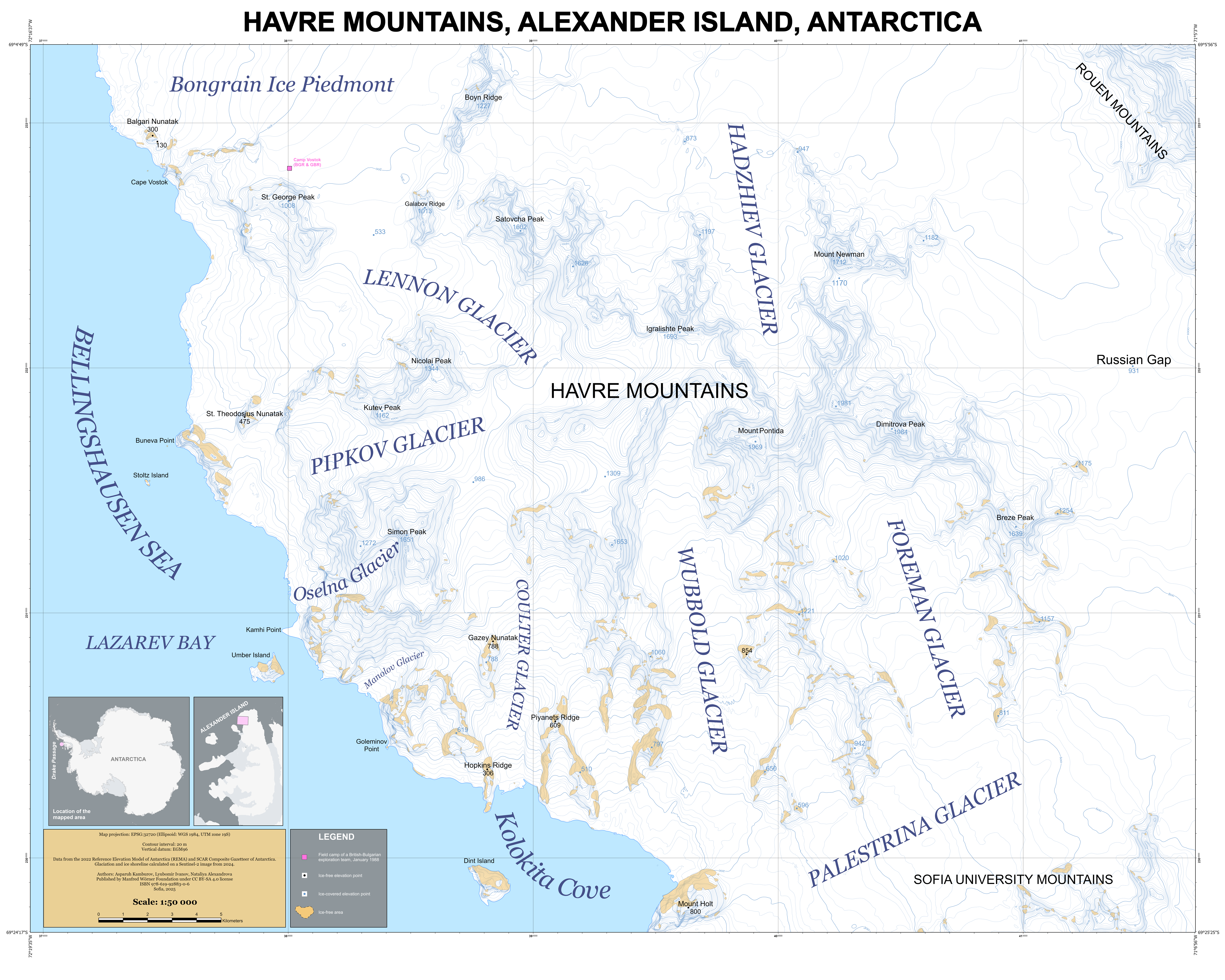
Map of Havre Mountains, Alexander Island in Antarctica

Goleminov Point (Bulgarian: Големинов нос, ‘Goleminov Nos’ \go-le-'mi-nov 'nos\) is the rocky point on the northwest coast of Alexander Island in Antarctica projecting 400 m westwards into Lazarev Bay southeast of the terminus of Manolov Glacier.

The feature is named after the Bulgarian composer, Marin Goleminov (1908-2000).

== Location ==
Goleminov Point is located at 69°20′37″S 71°56′58″W, which is 6.17 km southeast of Kamhi Point, 24.9 km south-southeast of Cape Vostok and 6 km northwest of Dint Island. British mapping in 1971.

== Maps ==
- British Antarctic Territory. Scale 1:200000 topographic map. DOS 610 – W 69 70. Tolworth, UK, 1971
- Antarctic Digital Database (ADD). Scale 1:250000 topographic map of Antarctica. Scientific Committee on Antarctic Research (SCAR). Since 1993, regularly upgraded and updated
