= Stoltz Island =

Island off the coast of Alexander Island, Antarctica

- Satellite image of Alexander Island

- Location within Antarctica
- Etymology: Charles L. Stoltz, part of Operation Deepfreeze

Geography
- Location: Alexander Island, Bellingshausen Sea, Antarctica
- Coordinates: 69°15′S 72°9′W

Location of Alexander Island in the Antarctic Peninsula region

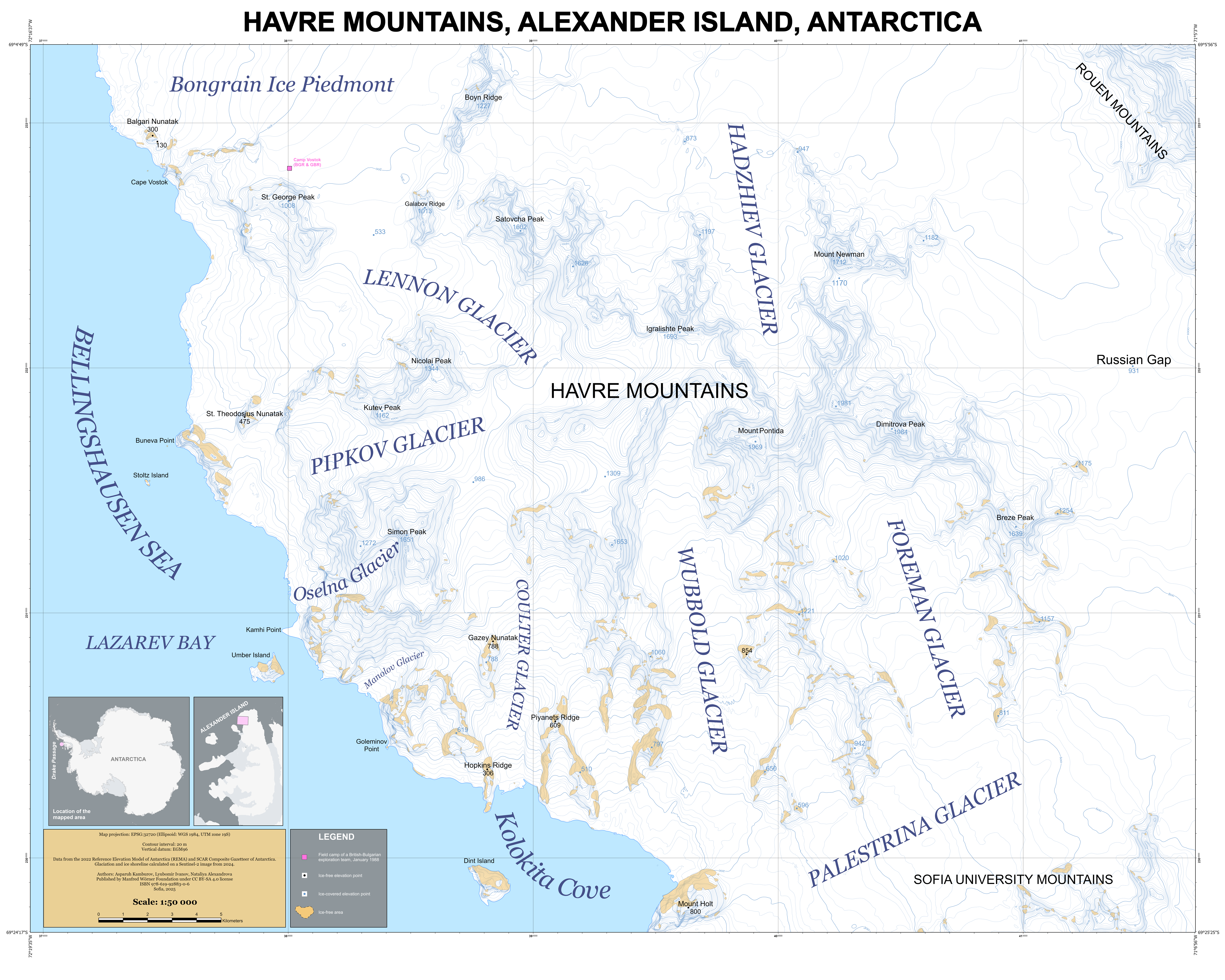
Map of Havre Mountains, Alexander Island in Antarctica

Stoltz Island (69°15′S 72°9′W) is a small island off the northwest coast of Alexander Island, Antarctica, 7 nautical miles (13 km) south of Cape Vostok and 1.09 mi (1.75 km) southwest of Buneva Point. The island was photographed from the air by the U.S. Navy, 1966, and was plotted by DOS, 1977, from the photographs and U.S. Landsat imagery of January 1974. Named by Advisory Committee on Antarctic Names (US-ACAN) for Lieutenant Commander Charles L. Stoltz, U.S. Navy, Staff Photographic Officer, Naval Support Force, Antarctica, Operation Deepfreeze, 1970 and 1971.

== See also ==
- List of Antarctic and sub-Antarctic islands
- Dint Island
- Dorsey Island
- Umber Island
