= Nicolai Peak =

Peak on Alexander Island, Antarctica

Location of Alexander Island in the Antarctic Peninsula region

Satellite image of Alexander Island

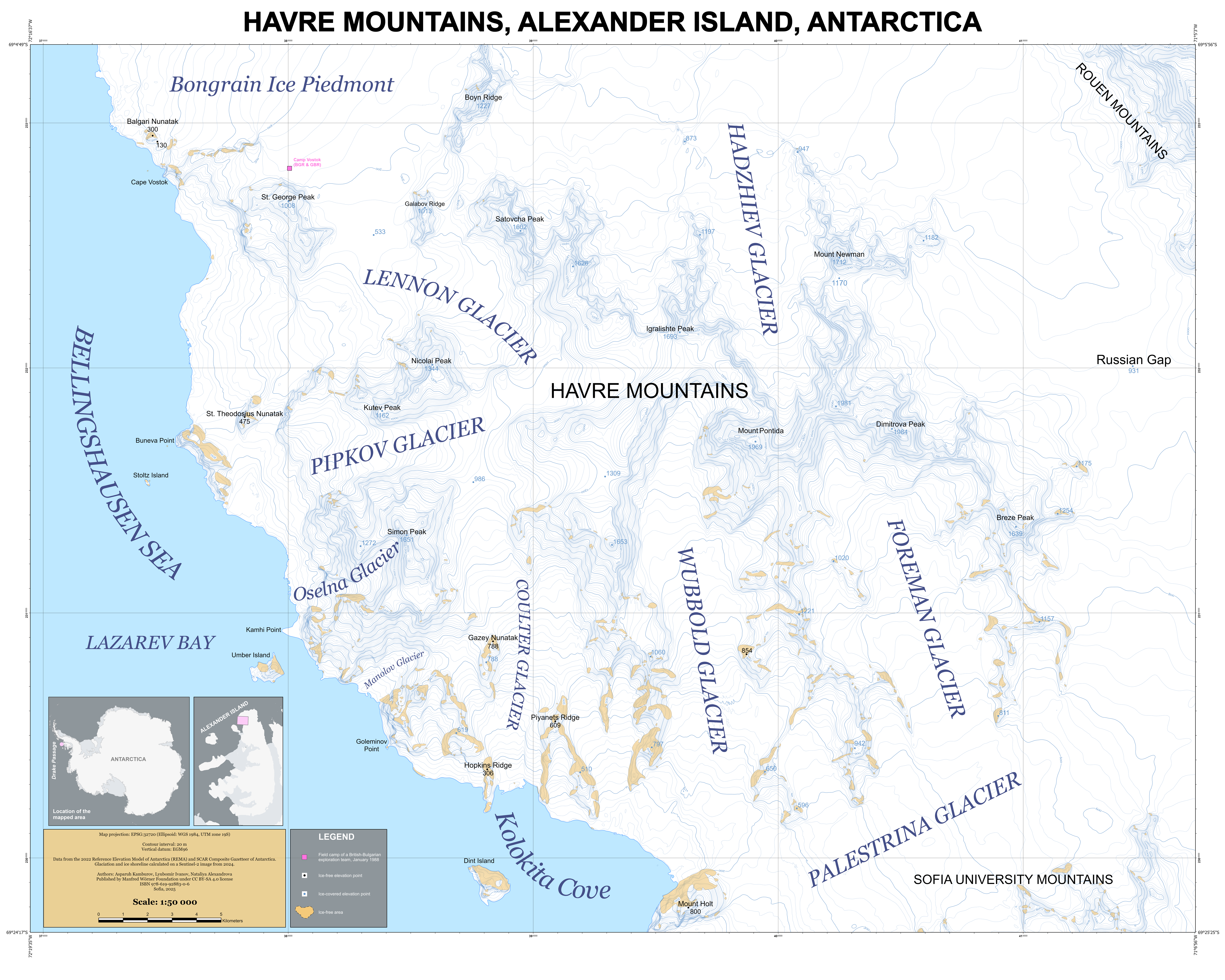
Map of Havre Mountains, Alexander Island in Antarctica

Nicolai Peak (Bulgarian: връх Николай, romanized: vrah Nikolay, IPA: [ˈvrɤx nikoˈɫaj]) is the ice-covered peak rising to 1342 m in Havre Mountains, northern Alexander Island in Antarctica. It has steep and partly ice-free southwest slopes, and surmounts Lennon Glacier to the north and east, and Pipkov Glacier to the south.

The feature is named after the Bulgarian opera singer Elena Nicolai (Stoyanka Nikolova, 1905–1993).

== Location ==
Nicolai Peak is located at 69°12′18″S 71°52′39″W, which is 11.18 km east-northeast of Buneva Point, 13.5 km southeast of Cape Vostok, 6.54 km southwest of Satovcha Peak and 7 km north-northeast of Simon Peak. British mapping in 1971.

== Maps ==
- British Antarctic Territory. Scale 1:200000 topographic map. DOS 610 – W 69 70. Tolworth, UK, 1971
- Antarctic Digital Database (ADD). Scale 1:250000 topographic map of Antarctica. Scientific Committee on Antarctic Research (SCAR). Since 1993, regularly upgraded and updated
