= Kutev Peak =

Peak on Alexander Island, Antarctica

Location of Alexander Island in the Antarctic Peninsula region

Satellite image of Alexander Island

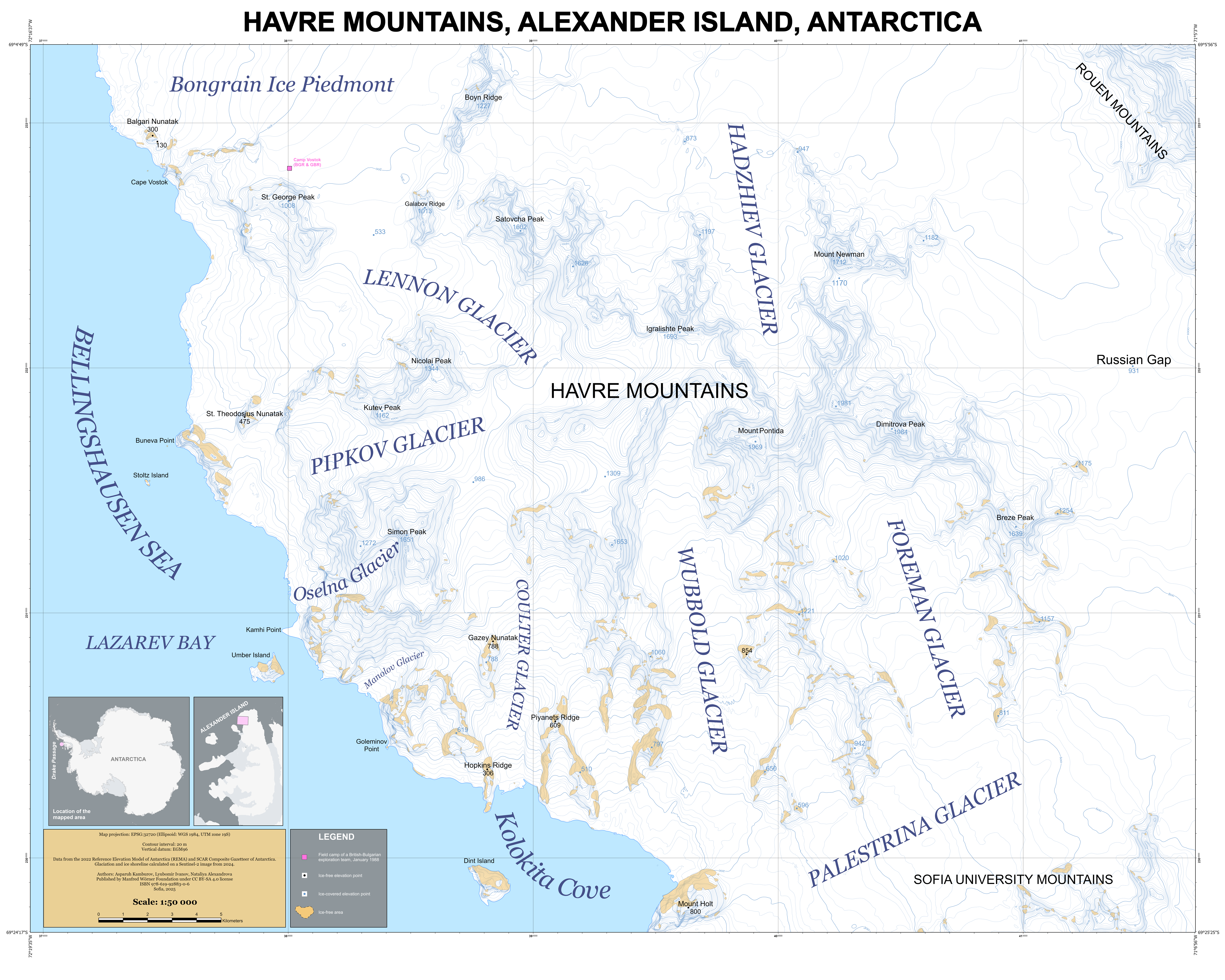
Map of Havre Mountains, Alexander Island in Antarctica

Kutev Peak (Bulgarian: Кутев връх, romanized: Kutev vrah, IPA: [ˈkutɛv ˈvrɤx]) is the mostly ice-covered peak rising to 1160 m in Havre Mountains, northern Alexander Island in Antarctica. It has precipitous and partly ice-free west slopes, and surmounts Lennon Glacier to the north and Pipkov Glacier to the south.

The feature is named after the Bulgarian composer and folk songs arranger Filip Kutev (1903-1982).

== Location ==
Kutev Peak is located at 69°13′13″S 71°56′07″W, which is 8.6 km east of Buneva Point, 9.31 km south-southeast of Saint George Peak, 2.85 km southwest of Nicolai Peak and 5.25 km north by west of Simon Peak. British mapping in 1971.

== Maps ==
- British Antarctic Territory. Scale 1:200000 topographic map. DOS 610 – W 69 70. Tolworth, UK, 1971
- Antarctic Digital Database (ADD). Scale 1:250000 topographic map of Antarctica. Scientific Committee on Antarctic Research (SCAR). Since 1993, regularly upgraded and updated
