= Pipkov Glacier =

Glacier on Alexander Island, Antarctica

Location of Alexander Island in the Antarctic Peninsula region

Satellite image of Alexander Island

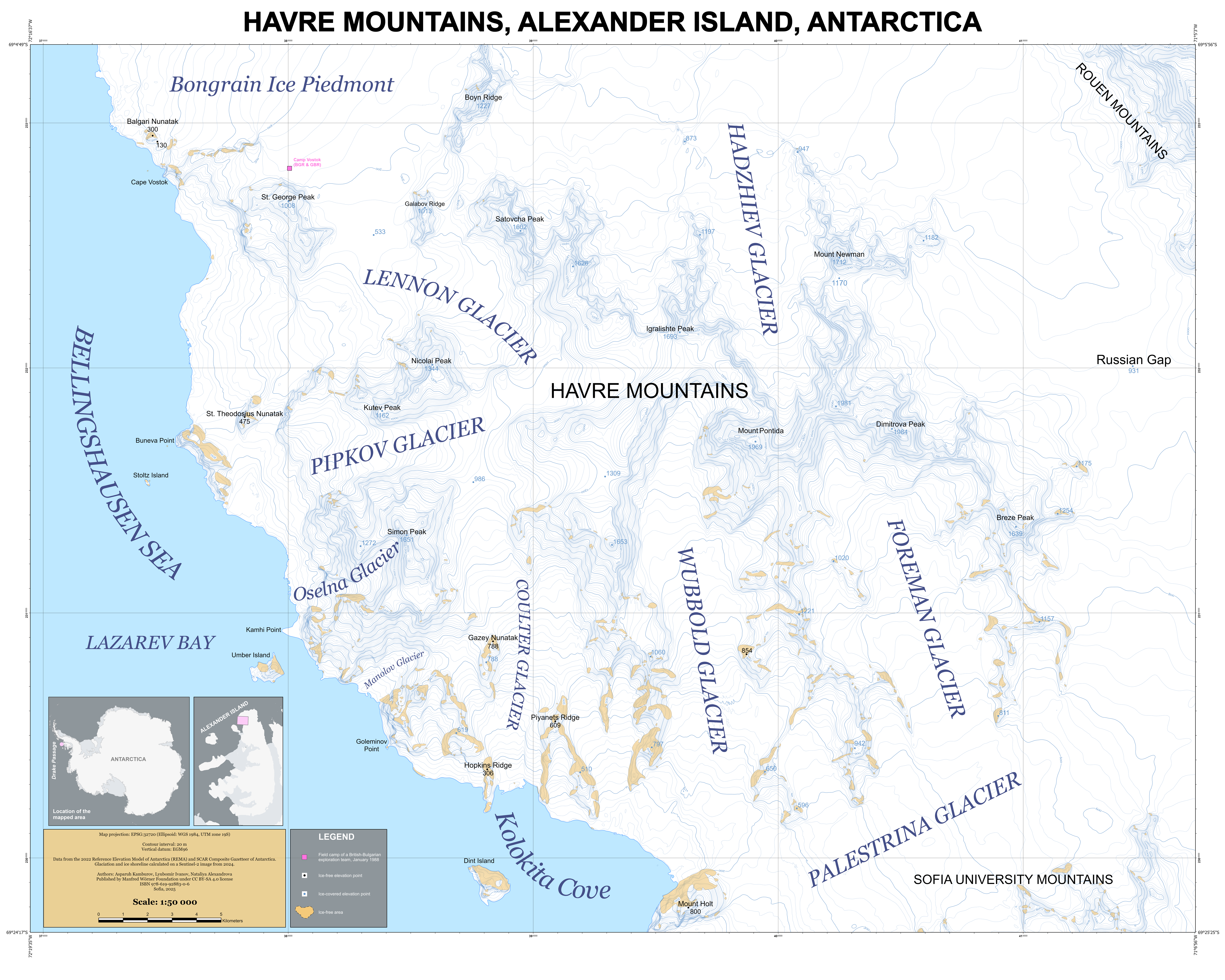
Map of Havre Mountains, Alexander Island in Antarctica

Pipkov Glacier (Bulgarian: Пипков ледник, romanized: Pipkov lednik, IPA: [ˈpipkof ˈlɛdnik]) is the 11 km long in east-northeast to west-southwest direction and 3.2 km wide glacier on the west side of Havre Mountains in northern Alexander Island, Antarctica. The glacier is situated south and southwest of Lennon Glacier, and north of Oselna Glacier. It flows westwards between Kutev Peak and Nicolai Peak on the north, and Simon Peak on the south, and enters Lazarev Bay southeast of Buneva Point and north of Kamhi Point.

The feature is named after the Bulgarian composers Panayot Pipkov (1871-1942) and his son Lyubomir Pipkov (1904-1974).

== Location ==
Pipkov Glacier is centered at 69°14′05″S 71°56′10″W. British mapping in 1971 and 1991.

== Maps ==
- British Antarctic Territory. Scale 1:200000 topographic map. DOS 610 – W 69 70. Tolworth, UK, 1971
- British Antarctic Territory. Scale 1:250000 topographic map. Sheet SR19-20/5. APC UK, 1991
- Antarctic Digital Database (ADD). Scale 1:250000 topographic map of Antarctica. Scientific Committee on Antarctic Research (SCAR). Since 1993, regularly upgraded and updated
