= Dorsey Island =

Island near Antarctica

- Location of Dorsey Island

- Location within Antarctica

Geography
- Location: Antarctica
- Coordinates: 69°17′S 71°49′W
- Length: 22 km (13.7 mi)
- Highest elevation: 500 m (1600 ft)
- Highest point: Mount Snell

Administration
- Administered under the Antarctic Treaty System

Demographics
- Population: Uninhabited

Dorsey Island is a mainly ice-covered island, 22 kilometres (12 nmi) long, lying in Wilkins Sound off the west coast of Alexander Island, Antarctica. The highest point of the island is Mount Snell which rises to about 500 m. It was discovered and roughly mapped from aircraft by members of East Base of the United States Antarctic Service, 1939–41, and was named after Herbert G. Dorsey, Jr., of the U.S. Weather Bureau, a meteorologist at East Base who devised a method of predicting with exceptional accuracy the periods in which weather would be suitable for flying. It was remapped from air photos taken by the Ronne Antarctic Research Expedition, 1947–48, by D. Searle of the Falkland Islands Dependencies Survey in 1960. The position of the island and its outline were corrected from U.S. Landsat imagery of 1973–75 and 1979. An area of open seawater near Dorsey Island that appears largely unchanged in imagery from 1986 and 1990.

== See also ==
- List of Antarctic and sub-Antarctic islands
- Dint Island
- Umber Island
- Merger Island
