= Simon Peak (Antarctica) =

Mountain in Antarctica

Location of Alexander Island in the Antarctic Peninsula region

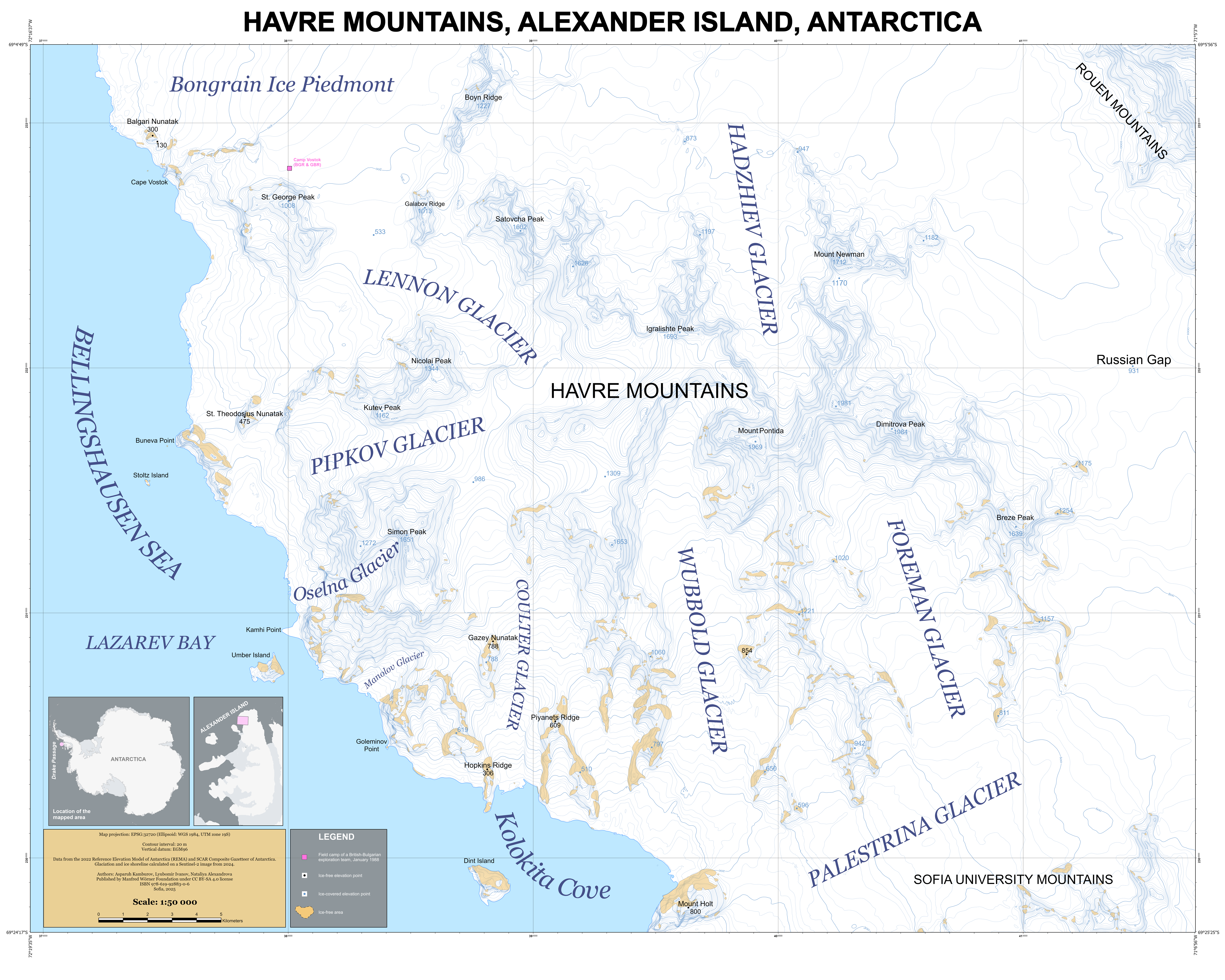
Map of Havre Mountains, Alexander Island in Antarctica

Simon Peak (69°16′S 71°53′W) is a mountain rising to about 1,000 m on the west side of the Havre Mountains, situated in the northwest portion of Alexander Island, Antarctica. The peak lies northeast of Umber Island, an island situated in Lazarev Bay off the west coast of Alexander Island. It is situated 9.9 km east-southeast of Buneva Point, 6.4 km northeast of Kamhi Point, 14.65 km west of Mount Pontida and 6.15 km north-northeast of Gazey Nunatak, and surmounts Pipkov Glacier to the north and Oselna Glacier to the southwest. Possibly sighted by FAE, 1908–10, in January 1909; surveyed by British Antarctic Survey in 1975–76. Named after Alec Edward Simon, British Antarctic Survey aircraft mechanic, who worked on nearby Adelaide Island during the summers of years 1972 to 1976.

== See also ==
- Holst Peak
- Ravel Peak
- Richter Peaks
