= Balgari Nunatak =

Nunatak on Alexander Island, Antarctica

Location of Alexander Island in the Antarctic Peninsula region

Satellite image of Alexander Island

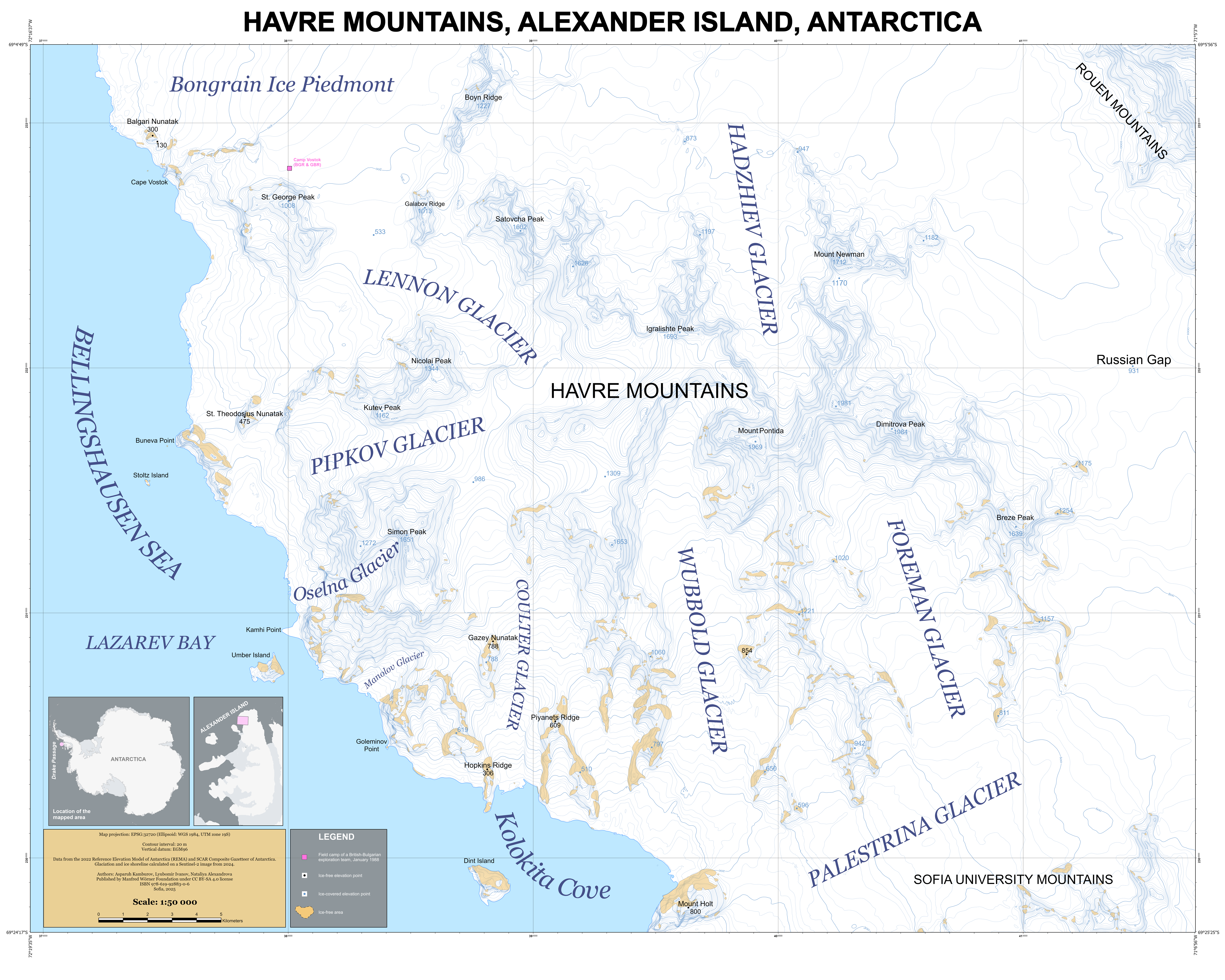
Map of Havre Mountains, Alexander Island in Antarctica

Balgari Nunatak (Bulgarian: нунатак Българи, ‘Nunatak Balgari’ /'nunatak 'bɤlgari/) is the mostly ice-free rocky ridge extending 800 m in east–west direction and 550 m wide, rising to 282 m on the south side of Bongrain Ice Piedmont in northern Alexander Island, Antarctica. It surmounts Lazarev Bay to the south. The nunatak was visited on 3 January 1988 by the geological survey party of Christo Pimpirev and Borislav Kamenov (First Bulgarian Antarctic Expedition), and Philip Nell and Peter Marquis (British Antarctic Survey). On that occasion, a small rocky offshoot situated 360 m southeast of the nunatak's summit was designated as the site for a future Bulgarian Antarctic base. However, the two prefabricated huts brought for the purpose on board the Soviet Research Ship Mikhail Somov in April 1988 could not be helicoptered ashore due to bad weather, and were erected on Livingston Island instead.

The feature is so named in connection with the first choice of a site for the Bulgarian Antarctic base.

== Location ==
The ridge is located at 69°06′55.5″S 72°09′25″W, which is 630 m from the seashore, 1.85 km north by west of Cape Vostok, 13.4 km west of Boyn Ridge and 6.1 km northwest of Saint George Peak.

== Maps ==
- British Antarctic Territory. Scale 1:250000 topographic map. Sheet SR19-20/5. APC UK, 1991
- Antarctic Digital Database (ADD). Scale 1:250000 topographic map of Antarctica. Scientific Committee on Antarctic Research (SCAR). Since 1993, regularly upgraded and updated
