= Oselna Glacier =

Glacier in Antarctica

Location of Alexander Island in the Antarctic Peninsula region

Satellite image of Alexander Island

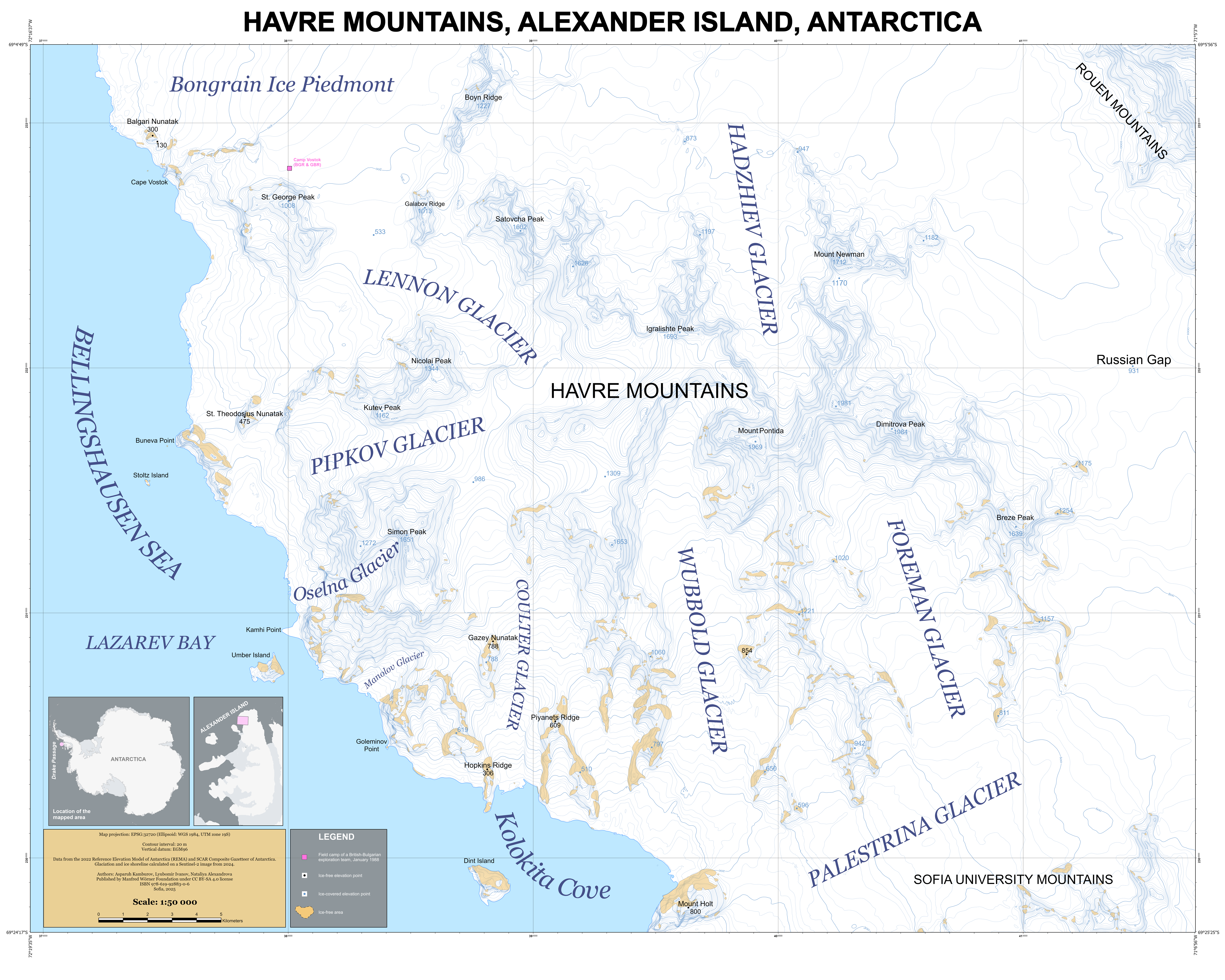
Map of Havre Mountains, Alexander Island in Antarctica

Oselna Glacier (Bulgarian: ледник Оселна, romanized: lednik Oselna, IPA: [ˈlɛdnik oˈsɛɫnɐ]) is the 4 km long in east-west direction and 1 km wide glacier on the west side of Havre Mountains in northern Alexander Island, Antarctica. The glacier is situated south of Pipkov Glacier and north of Manolov Glacier. It drains the southwest slopes of Simon Peak, flows southwestwards and enters Lazarev Bay north of Kamhi Point. The feature is named after the settlement of Oselna in Northwestern Bulgaria.

== Location ==
Oselna Glacier is centered at 69°17′05″S 71°58′30″W.

== Maps ==
- British Antarctic Territory. Scale 1:200000 topographic map. DOS 610 – W 69 70. Tolworth, UK, 1971
- British Antarctic Territory. Scale 1:250000 topographic map. Sheet SR19-20/5. APC UK, 1991
- Antarctic Digital Database (ADD). Scale 1:250000 topographic map of Antarctica. Scientific Committee on Antarctic Research (SCAR). Since 1993, regularly upgraded and updated
