= Manolov Glacier =

Glacier on Alexander Island, Antarctica

Location of Alexander Island in the Antarctic Peninsula region

Satellite image of Alexander Island

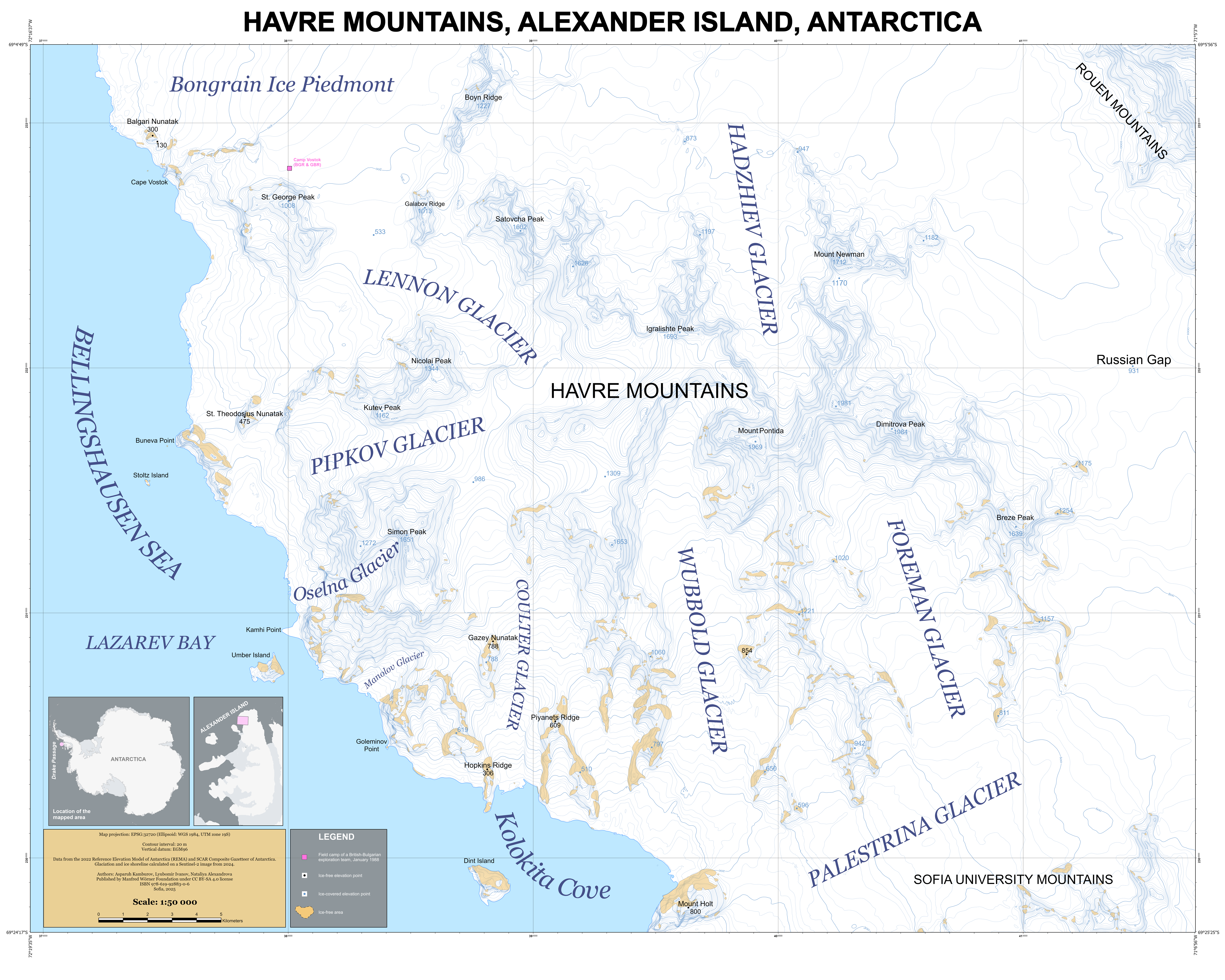
Map of Havre Mountains, Alexander Island in Antarctica

Manolov Glacier (Bulgarian: Манолов ледник, romanized: Manolov lednik, IPA: [mɐˈnɔɫof ˈlɛdnik]) is the 3 km long in east-northeast to west-southwest direction and 1.3 km wide glacier on the west side of Havre Mountains in northern Alexander Island, Antarctica. It is situated south of Oselna Glacier and west of Coulter Glacier, flows southwestwards and enters Lazarev Bay northwest of Goleminov Point.

The feature is named after the Bulgarian composer Emanuil Manolov (1860-1902).

== Location ==
Manolov Glacier is centered at 69°18′50″S 71°56′10″W. British mapping in 1971.

== Maps ==
- British Antarctic Territory. Scale 1:200000 topographic map. DOS 610 – W 69 70. Tolworth, UK, 1971
- Antarctic Digital Database (ADD). Scale 1:250000 topographic map of Antarctica. Scientific Committee on Antarctic Research (SCAR). Since 1993, regularly upgraded and updated
