= Dint =

Dint may refer to:

- William Colbeck (gangster) (1890-1943), American gangster nicknamed "Dint"
- Dint Island, Antarctica
