= Kamhi Point =

Location of Alexander Island in the Antarctic Peninsula region

Satellite image of Alexander Island

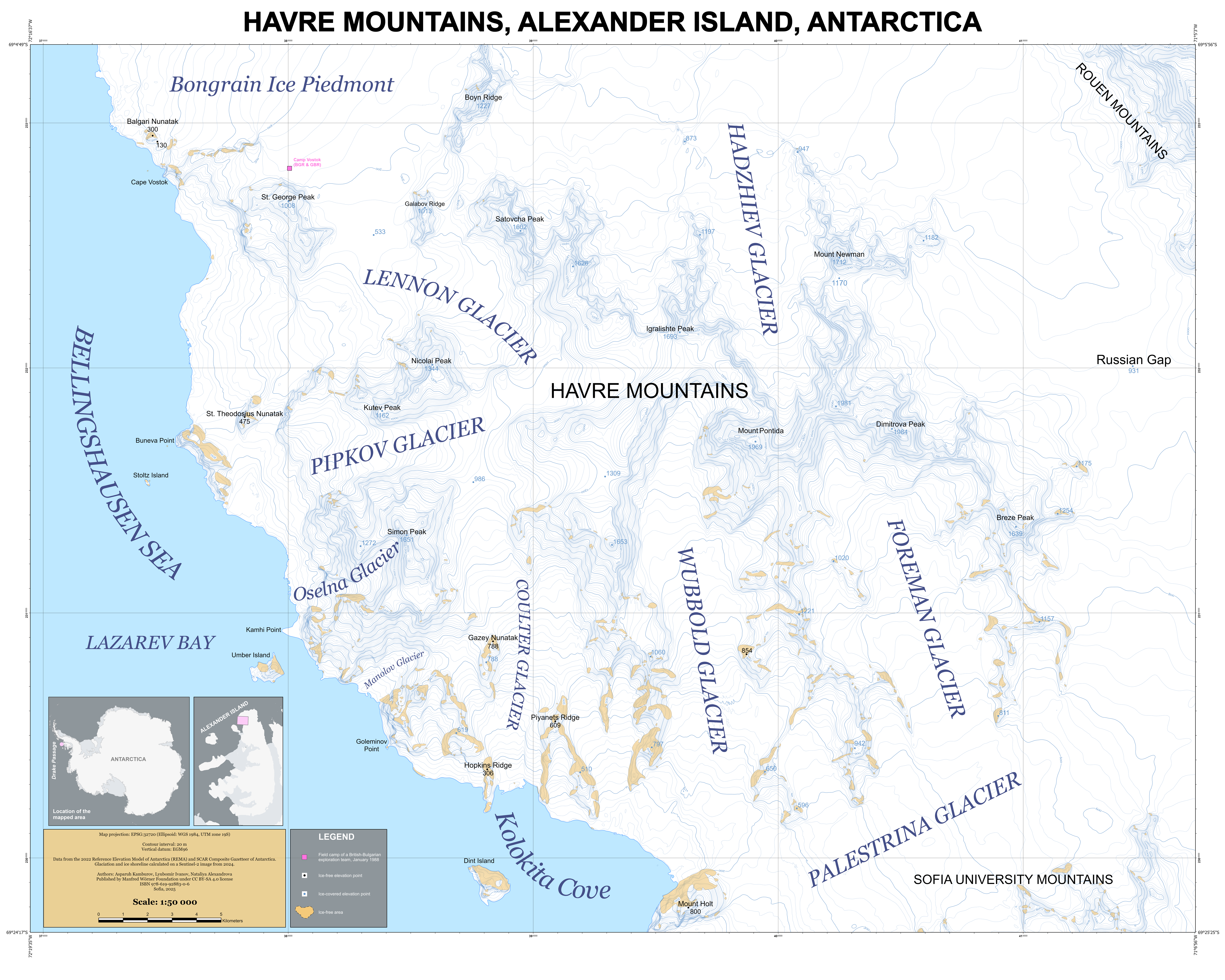
Map of Havre Mountains, Alexander Island in Antarctica

Kamhi Point (Bulgarian: нос Камхи, ‘Nos Kamhi’ \'nos kam-'hi\) is the sharp rocky point on the northwest coast of Alexander Island in Antarctica projecting 450 m westwards into Lazarev Bay south of the terminus of Oselna Glacier.

The feature is named after Rafael Moshe Kamhi (1870-1970), a leader of the Bulgarian liberation movement in Macedonia.

== Location ==
Kamhi Point is located at 69°17′57.7″S 72°02′36″W, which is 19.17 km south-southeast of Cape Vostok, 8.8 km southeast of Buneva Point, 6.17 km northwest of Goleminov Point and 1 km northeast of Umber Island. British mapping in 1991.

== Maps ==
- British Antarctic Territory. Scale 1:250000 topographic map. Sheet SR19-20/5. APC UK, 1991
- Antarctic Digital Database (ADD). Scale 1:250000 topographic map of Antarctica. Scientific Committee on Antarctic Research (SCAR). Since 1993, regularly upgraded and updated
