= Lyubomir Pipkov =

Bulgarian composer (1904–1974)

Lyubomir Panaïotov Pipkov (Bulgarian: Любомир Панайотов Пипков) (September 6, 1904 – May 9, 1974) was a Bulgarian composer, pianist, and music educator. He is considered among the founders of Bulgaria's modern professional musical establishment and one of its most important composers.

== Life ==
Pipkov was born to a musical family in Lovech, Principality of Bulgaria, on September 6, 1904. His father, Panayot Pipkov, was a composer and bandmaster; his grandfather, Hristo Pipkov, was a clarinetist. As a child, Pipkov demonstrated an interest in painting and poetry before turning to music. In 1919 he enrolled in the Sofia Music School (today the Lyubomir Pipkov National School of Music), where he studied under Ivan Torchanov, Heinrich Wiesner, and Dobri Hristov. Two years later he composed the fight song for PFC Levski Sofia, an early composition which was subsequently lost. After graduation, Pipkov composed a number of works, among them his first major score, the 22 Variations for piano.

In 1926, Pipkov embarked to Paris, enrolling in the École Normale de Musique. During this period he was a composition pupil of Paul Dukas and Nadia Boulanger; he also studied piano under Yvonne Lefébure. During this period he composed his String Quartet No. 1 and Piano Trio. The former work is credited as being the first ever string quartet composed by a Bulgarian. Six years later he graduated with honors. In 1932, Pipkov decided to return to his native Bulgaria, where he would remain for the rest of his life.

Upon setting foot again in his native land, Pipkov took up work as a répétiteur and choirmaster for the National Opera of Bulgaria. On January 23, 1933, Pipkov—along with Pancho Vladigerov, Petko Staynov, and a number of other composers—became one of the founding members of the Contemporary Music Society, an organization which would eventually become the Union of Bulgarian Composers (SBK). In 1937 Pipkov debuted his first opera, Yana's Nine Brothers. Despite creating a stir at its premiere, the work was not performed again until 1961; it was revived in Sofia in late summer and fall 2020.

The 1940s would see Pipkov establish himself at the head of Bulgaria's musical establishment. He began by completing his Symphony No. 1, the first of four, in 1940. Pipkov dedicated the score to the fighters of the Republican cause in the Spanish Civil War. Three years later, he was appointed head of the National Opera of Bulgaria, a post he would hold until 1948. From 1945 to 1954, Pipkov was the elected Chairman of the SBK. He was also founder and first editor-in-chief of the magazine Muzika (later renamed Bŭlgarska muzika). Despite his success, he also incurred the dislike and criticism of officialdom in the postwar People's Republic of Bulgaria, which forced his removal from these positions.

Aside from his work as a composer and teacher, Pipkov was also active as a poet, critic, and representative for Bulgaria at international conferences of music educators. He was a board member of the International Society for Music Education. He remained a professor at the National Academy of Music until his death on May 9, 1974.

== Music and honors ==
Pipkov composed in a diverse array of genres. These included three operas, four symphonies, and three string quartets (the last of which includes a part for timpani obbligato); as well as various chamber music and piano works, oratorios, mass songs, and film scores.

For his services to Bulgarian music, Pipkov was made a Hero of Socialist Labor and People's Artist of Bulgaria, and was thrice awarded the Dmitrov Prize. In later life he was awarded the Order of the People's Republic of Bulgaria and the Order of Georgi Dimitrov. He was posthumously inducted into East Germany's Akademie der Künste der DDR and made an honorary citizen of Lovech. Bulgaria commemorated the 100th anniversary of Pipkov's birth by issuing a postage stamp in his honor. The Pipkov Glacier in Antarctica is named after his father and him.

== Legacy ==
In his homeland, Pipkov is considered among Bulgaria's greatest composers. Shortly after Pipkov returned to Bulgaria from France, Petko Staynov praised his colleague's "expressive" language, with its "bracing, heartfelt, sincere melodies" and "violent and unrestrained rhythms". In the early 1940s, Tamara Yankova held up his work as an example of an artist who resisted the "modernomania" of the times, instead reaching into the "Bulgarian spirit" to create original music. Pipkov himself said that he sought to draw inspiration for his music "from life itself, not theoretical problems":

I want to do what pulses through my blood, to feel the simple life, the sun, the natural.

In contrast to his renown in Bulgaria, Pipkov's music is rarely performed internationally and its reception has been muted. Reviewing a performance of a Pipkov work for string quartet at the 1953 Prague Spring Festival, Malcolm Rayment called the unidentified score "attractive" and "light". Edward Greenfield called the composer the "most interesting" of Bulgaria's "middle generation" of composers, specifically singling out Yana's Nine Brothers for orchestration that was "masterly in its beauty". Boris Yarustovsky praised the "daring musico-dramaturgic innovation" and "democratic quality" of the composer's final opera, Antigone '43. The "jaunty, lyrical, somewhat Frenchified" Clarinet Concerto was appraised warmly by Claire Polin, who focused on the composer's handling of the "complex rhtyhmic problems" in the score. On the other hand, Stephen Walsh dismissed Pipkov's Symphony No. 1 as "an amiably nondescript work which might have been written to cool Comrade Zhdanov's heated brow".

Speaking to American interviewers in 1973, Dmitri Shostakovich named Pipkov, along with Sergei Prokofiev and Benjamin Britten, as among those who contributed "excellent" symphonic works in the later 20th century.
