= Theodosius of Tarnovo =

Saint Theodosius of Tarnovo Свети Теодосий Търновски
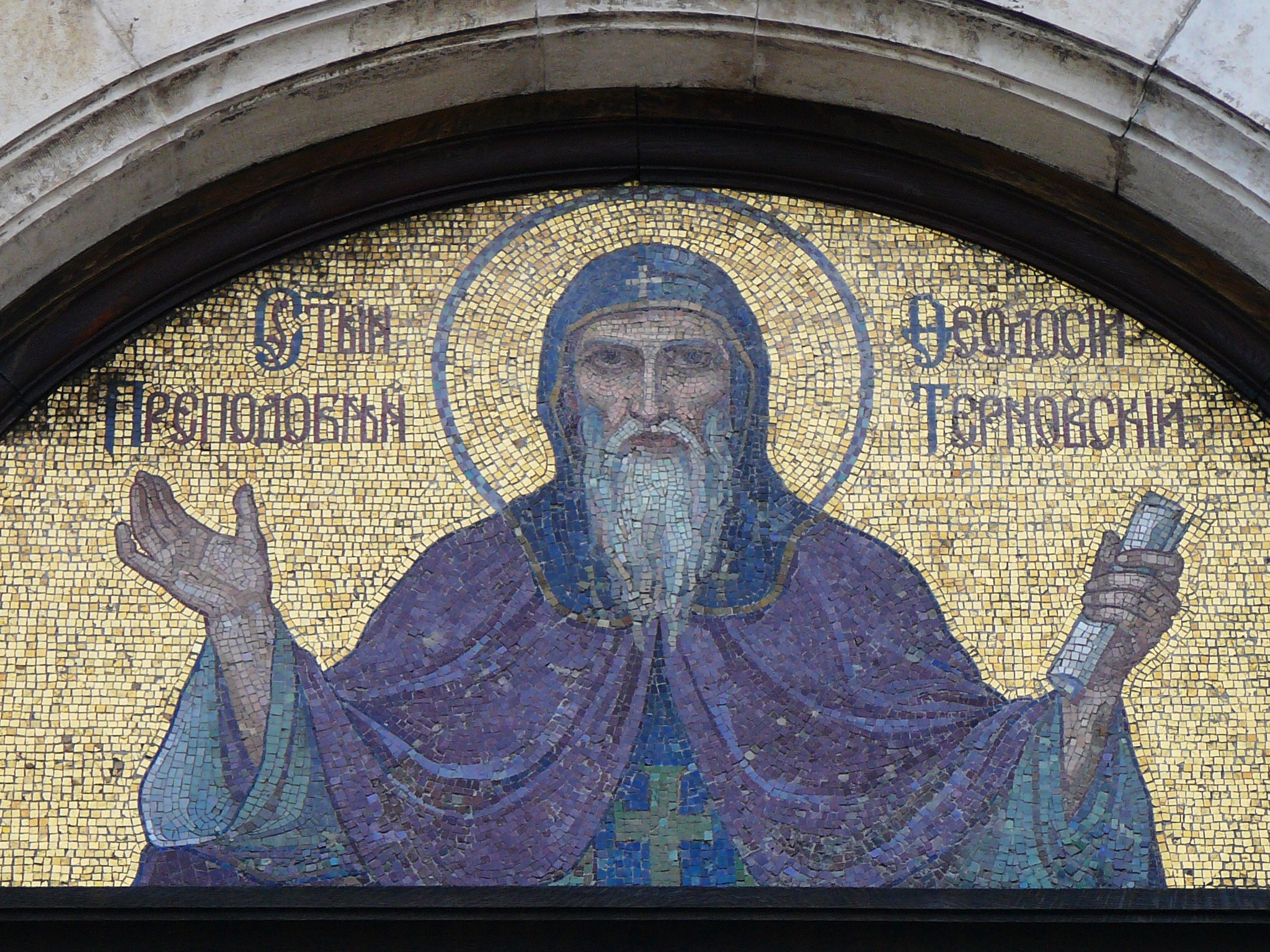
- Fresco of Theodosius of Tarnovo at Alexander Nevsky Cathedral, Sofia
- Born: c. 1300 near Tarnovo, Bulgaria
- Died: 27 November 1363
- Venerated in: Bulgaria
- Feast: 27 November

The Holy Venerable Theodosius of Tarnovo (Bulgarian: Теодосий Търновски, Greek: Άγιος Θεοδόσιος του Τυρνόβου, Teodosiy Tarnovski) (died 1363) was a high-ranking 14th-century Bulgarian cleric and hermit. He is credited with establishing hesychasm in the Second Bulgarian Empire. A disciple of Gregory of Sinai, Theodosius founded the Kilifarevo monastery and school near the then-Bulgarian capital Tarnovo and took an important part in the condemning of various heresies during the reign of Tsar Ivan Alexander of Bulgaria.

Theodosius died in 1363 at the Monastery of St Mamant in Constantinople. He went to the Byzantine capital on a visit to his fellow, Patriarch Callistus I, who consequently wrote a long passional about Theodosius. Among Theodosius' disciples was Patriarch Evtimiy, the last head of the medieval Bulgarian Orthodox Church, as well as a writer and hesychast.

== Namesakes ==
St. Theodosius Nunatak in Antarctica is named after Theodosius of Tarnovo.
