= Mount Snell =

Mountain on Dorsey Island, Antarctica

Mount Snell (70°20′S 71°33′W) is the southwesternmost and highest (about 500 m) of the three peaks on Dorsey Island, an island merged within the Wilkins Ice Shelf, off the northwest coast of Alexander Island and situated near the entrance of Haydn Inlet, Antarctica. The peak appears in U.S. Navy aerial photographs, 1966, and U.S. Landsat imagery taken 1975. This feature was named by the Advisory Committee on Antarctic Names for Lieutenant Alfred W. Snell, U.S. Navy, Staff Meteorologist, U.S. Navy Operation Deepfreeze, 1967 and 1968.
