= Emanuil Manolov =

Bulgarian composer (1860–1902)

- Емануил Манолов
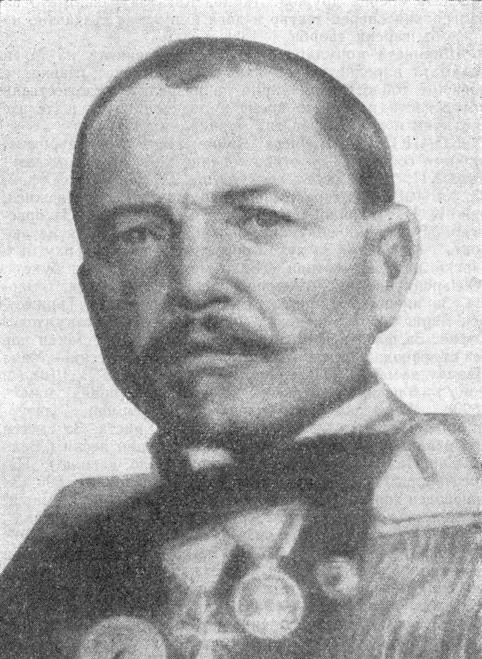
- An image of Manolov before his death in 1902.
- Born: January 7, 1860; Gabrovo, Niš Eyalet, Principality of Bulgaria, Ottoman Empire
- Died: February 19, 1902 (aged 42); Kazanlak, Principality of Bulgaria
- Notable work: Siromahkinia; Kakva moma vidiah, mamo

Emanuil Manolov (Bulgarian: Емануил Манолов; 7 January 1860 – 2 February 1902) was a Bulgarian composer.

Born at Gabrovo, Manolov is thought to be one of the founders of the Bulgarian professional musical culture. He went to the Moscow Conservatory from 1879 to 1885. He composed the first Bulgarian opera Siromahkinia, based on Ivan Vazov's work with the same title, consisting of two parts. His works in the genres of the "kitka" and schools songs are very popular. One of his most famous works is the song "What a Girl I saw, Mama" (Kakva moma vidiah, mamo). He died at Kazanlak.

== Honours ==
Manolov Glacier in Antarctica is named after Emanuil Manolov.
