= Panayot Pipkov =

Bulgarian composer (1871–1942)

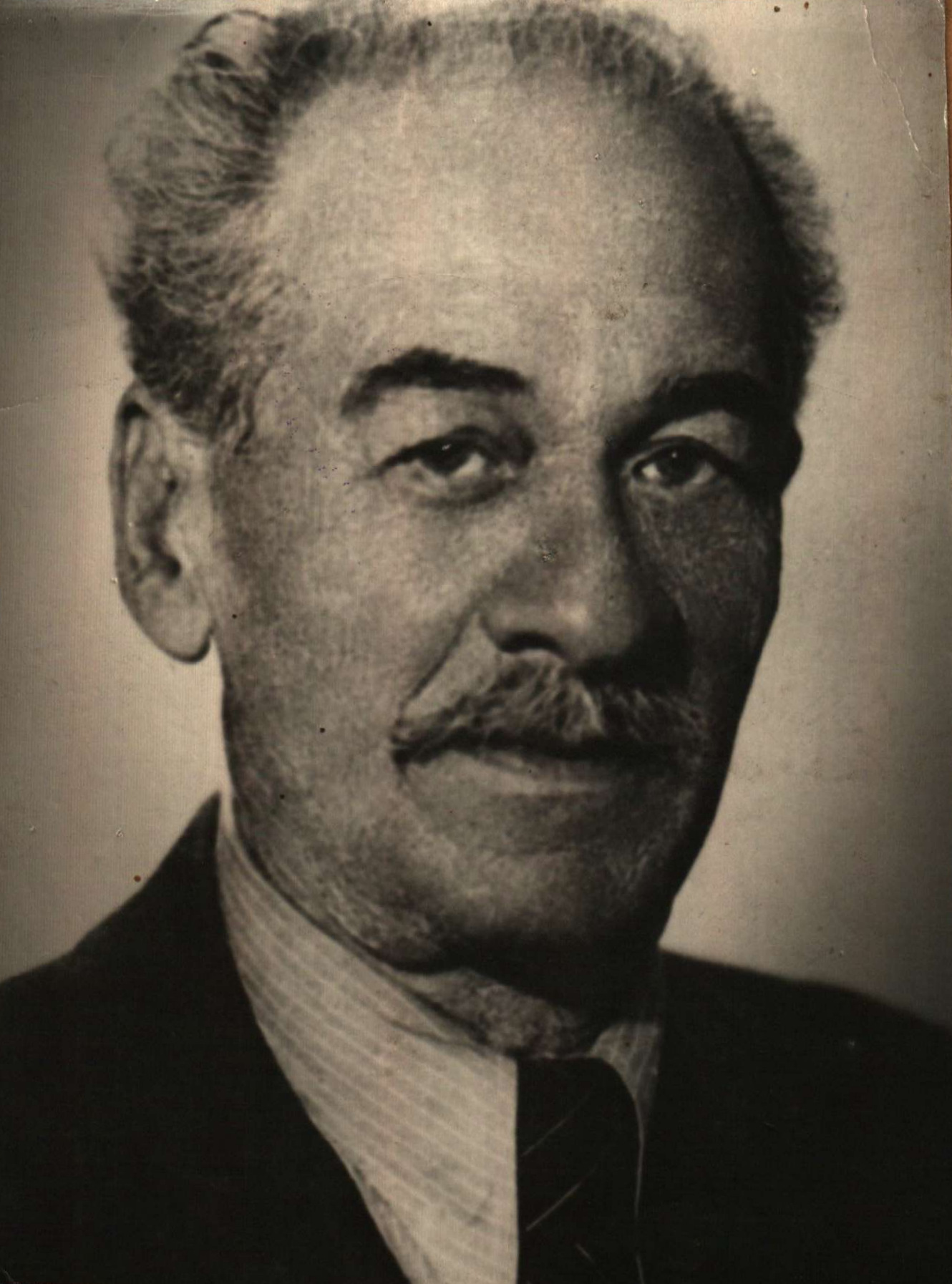
Panayot Pipkov

Panayot Hristov Pipkov (Bulgarian: Панайот Христов Пипков) (21 November 1871 – 25 August 1942) was a Bulgarian composer. He studied music in Milan, Italy, and taught in Lovech and Sofia. He was the father of composer Lyubomir Pipkov.

== Honours ==
Pipkov Glacier in Antarctica is named after Panayot Pipkov and Lyubomir Pipkov.
