= Cape Westbrook =

Cape Westbrook (71°50′S 75°26′W) is a snow-covered cape forming the southwest extremity of Alexander Island, Antarctica. The headland was first mapped by the United States Geological Survey from aerial photographs taken by Ronne Antarctic Research Expedition in 1947, U.S. Navy, 1967–68, and from U.S. Landsat imagery taken 1972–73. Named by Advisory Committee on Antarctic Names for Captain Darrel E. Westbrook, Jr., U.S. Navy, Commander, U.S. Naval Support Force, Antarctica, from June 1978 to June 1980.

== See also ==
- Cape Vostok
