= Rafael Moshe Kamhi =

IMRO revolutionary

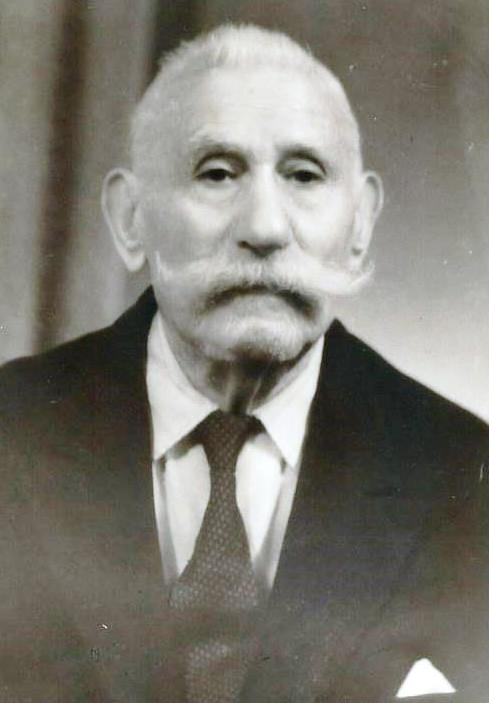
- Rafael Moshe Kamhi (1963)
- Born: Рафаел Моше Камхи; December 15, 1870; Monastir, Ottoman Empire (now Bitola, North Macedonia)
- Died: July 8, 1970; Tel Aviv, Israel
- Other name: Skander Beg

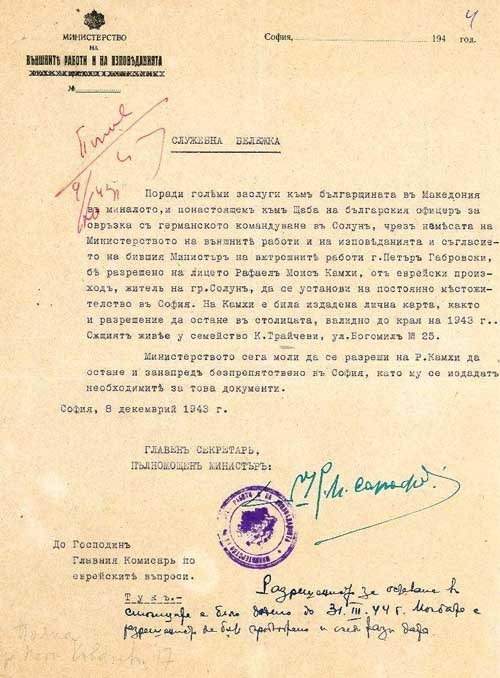
Official notice of Kamhi issued by the Bulgarian authorities, used to help him to obtain Bulgarian citizenship during World War II.

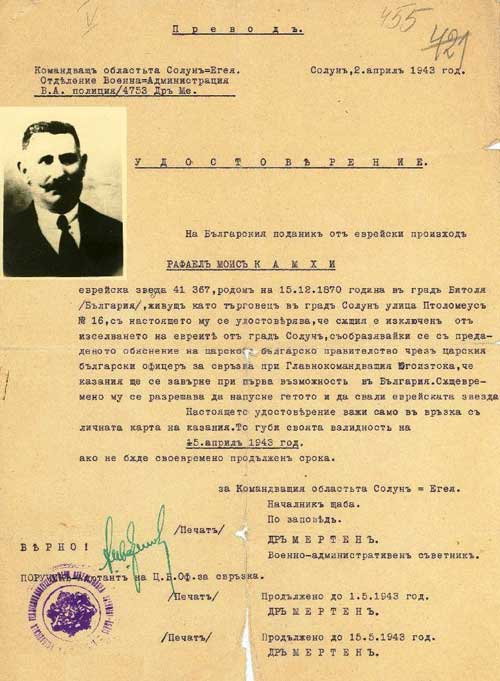
Official document issued by the Bulgarian authorities to Kamhi, which served as a guarantee to Nazi Germany, that prevented him being sent to an extermination camp.

Rafael Moshe Kamhi (Bulgarian and Macedonian: Рафаел Моше Камхи; 1870–1970), also known by the military pseudonym Skanderbeg, was a Sephardic Jew from Monastir (now Bitola) in Ottoman Macedonia. Besides being Jewish, Kamhi felt also strong attachment to the region of Macedonia as his native homeland. Kamhi was elected as liaison officer of the Internal Macedonian Revolutionary Organization (IMRO). He directly participated in the Miss Stone Affair and in the Ilinden–Preobrazhenie Uprising of August 1903.

Kamhi is among the few survivors of the Holocaust in Thessaloniki after being saved by Bulgarian authorities, while 90% of the Jewish population there was murdered.

== Biography ==
Rafael Moshe Kamhi was born on 15 December 1870 in Bitola, Ottoman Empire (modern-day North Macedonia) in the family of Sephardi Jews. His father was Moshe Solomon Kamhi (1842–1891). At the end of 19th century around 4,000 Jews lived in Bitola. Kamhi was educated at the Jewish Gymnasium and was multilingual: while he spoke Ladino, Turkish, Greek, French and Bulgarian. When he was 23 Kamhi decided to build for himself additional floor on his father's house. Later he hired there Fidan Gruev from Smilevo, an IMRO-activist who introduced him with his brother, Dame Gruev. Afterwards he became de facto member of the IMRO in 1894 and in his house was made a shelter, where the archive and the case of the organization were kept. In the coming years Gotse Delchev, Gyorche Petrov, Milan Matov, Pere Toshev, Boris Sarafov and others also were hidden there. Later the shelter was discovered by the Ottoman authorities and Kamhi was arrested, but he was released after paying a bribe. In 1896, he was made de jure member and elected as Bitola-delegat on the Thessaloniki Congress of the organization. In Thessaloniki was taken a decision of changing the nationalistic character of the IMRO statute, which determined its members can be only Bulgarians. In this way the IMRO was open to all inhabitants of European Turkey. In 1901–1902 he participated in the "Miss Stone Affair." After the decision to rise the Ilinden Uprising in 1903, Kamhi became responsible on the relations between the authorities in Bulgaria and the revolutionary organization. As a merchant he traveled often, and that made him convenient for that purpose. By these special trips he met with a number of Bulgarian politicians, including Ferdinand I and the Crown Prince, later Bulgarian Tsar - Boris III. Along with these frequent visits to Bulgaria, some of which involved his brother, they both were suspected and arrested by the Ottoman authorities. Subsequently, the brothers were interned in Debar.

Kamhi directly participated in the Ilinden uprising in Debar while his brother, Menteš Kamhi (1877—1943), supplied rebels with weapons and other materials. Later the brothers organized a campaign to raise funds to the victims of the uprising in the Jewish community in Macedonia. In 1905 Kamhi participated in the Rila Congress of IMRO.

After the subsequent split of the Organization, Kamhi maintained close links with left-wing activists of the Macedonian liberation movement as Gyorche Petrov and Dimo Hadzhidimov. He did not hide his dislike of the centralist's wing activists. The left-wing faction, opposed Bulgarian nationalism, but the centralist's faction drifted more and more towards it. After the Balkan Wars Bitola remained in Serbia and he moved to Xanthi, then part of Bulgaria. At the end of World War I he joined the so-called Provisional representation of the former United Internal Revolutionary Organization. The Temporary representation advocated for autonomy of Macedonia as a part of a Balkan Federation. It threatened the autonomous Macedonia as a supranational state populated by different people as Bulgarians, Greeks, Serbs, Turks, Vlahs, Jews etc. The Bulgarian government of Alexander Malinov offered at the end of the First World War in late 1918 the idea of a united autonomous Macedonian state under the jurisdiction of the Great Powers, but it was refused. Due to the threat of a second national disaster for Bulgaria, before the signing of the Treaty of Neuilly, Kamhi conducted in 1919 a meeting with the then Prime Minister Teodor Teodorov, who struggled to keep order in the defeated country. He was offered to move to Thessaloniki, where the headquarters of the Triple Entente was located. He had to stand there with aim to present the interests of Bulgaria in Macedonia to the victors in the war. With the permission of the French General Charpy, he settled and stayed to live in the city. It is said he continued to work unofficially for Bulgarian interests in the period between the two World wars, when living in Greece.

During World War II, after the occupation of Greece, Kamhi participated in the creation of Bulgarian Club in Thessaloniki. In 1943, Rafael Kamhi was arrested by the German occupying forces in the city and had to be sent to a concentration camp in Central Europe. With the support of Bulgarian organizations and institutions as the Macedonian Scientific Institute, the Ilinden (Organization), the Union of Macedonian brotherhoods, the premier Bogdan Filov, and Tsar Boris III himself, he was released. Meanwhile, nearly all 54,000 Salonica's Jews were shipped to the Nazi extermination camps. The Jewish communities of Bulgarian-controlled Yugoslavian and Greek territories, numbering 12,000 were also almost completely wiped out. Kamhi's brother, who lived in Bitola, together with his relatives there, and all his relatives in Thessaloniki, were deported to Nazi extermination camps in Poland. Nevertheless, 48,000 Bulgarian Jews native to the old borders of Bulgaria, were saved. Two of the few survivors were his niece Rosa and nephew Joseph Kamhi, the children of his brother. Rosa after the war married the Yugoslav General Beno Ruso and Joseph moved to Israel.

After his rescuing Kamhi moved to Sofia, where he remained until 1949, when he moved to Israel. After the war, at the request of the Macedonian Scientific Institute and the Jewish Institute in Sofia, he began working on his memoirs, still in Bulgaria. From Tel Aviv he continued his correspondence with both Institutes in Sofia. He died in ripe old age in 1970 in Tel Aviv.

== Legacy ==
All the memoirs of Rafael Kamhi are now kept in the Bulgarian State Archive in the so-called Jewish collection of books and documents. The archives that he left contain documents in Bulgarian and Ladino. The collected memories of Rafael Kamhi were published under the title "I, the voyvoda Skender Bey" in 2000 in Sofia. In 2013, his memoirs were republished under the title "Rafael Kamhi: recollections of a Macedonian Jew revolutionary".

The first work of Macedonian historiography about Kamhi was written by Todor Simoski and published in 1953.

In March 2011 the President of Macedonia addressed participants of the Central Commemorative gathering in remembrance of the Holocaust of the Macedonian Jews and emphasized that Kamhi "was one of the promoters of the idea of a free and independent Macedonia". The Jewish Community in the Republic of Macedonia and Holocaust Memorial Fund of the Jews from Macedonia organized the event "Tribute to commander Rafael Kamhi and Heroes of Ilinden" during the national festival "10 days of the Krusevo Republic" in 2012. A wax figure of Rafael Moshe Kamhi is among 109 wax figures of notable Macedonian revolutionaries and intellectuals exhibited at the Museum of the Macedonian Struggle in Skopje. Kamhi Point in Antarctica is named after Rafael Kamhi.

== Sources ==
- Assa, Aaron (1994) [First published in Bulgarian language in Jerusalem in 1972]. Macedonia and the Jewish people. Macedonian Review. ISBN 978-9989-645-02-0.
- Karajanov, Petar (2003). Rafael Moše Kamhi: ilindenski deec od evrejsko poteklo. Veda. ISBN 9789989639074.
- Stojanovski, Aleksandar (2006). Македонија под турската власт: статии и други прилози. Ин-т за национална историја. ISBN 9789989159053.
- Рафаел Камхи: Спомени на един евреин македонски революционер, съставител: Цочо Билярски, издателство: Синева, ISBN 9786197086010, второ издание, 2013 год.
