= Marin Goleminov =

Bulgarian musician (1908–2000)

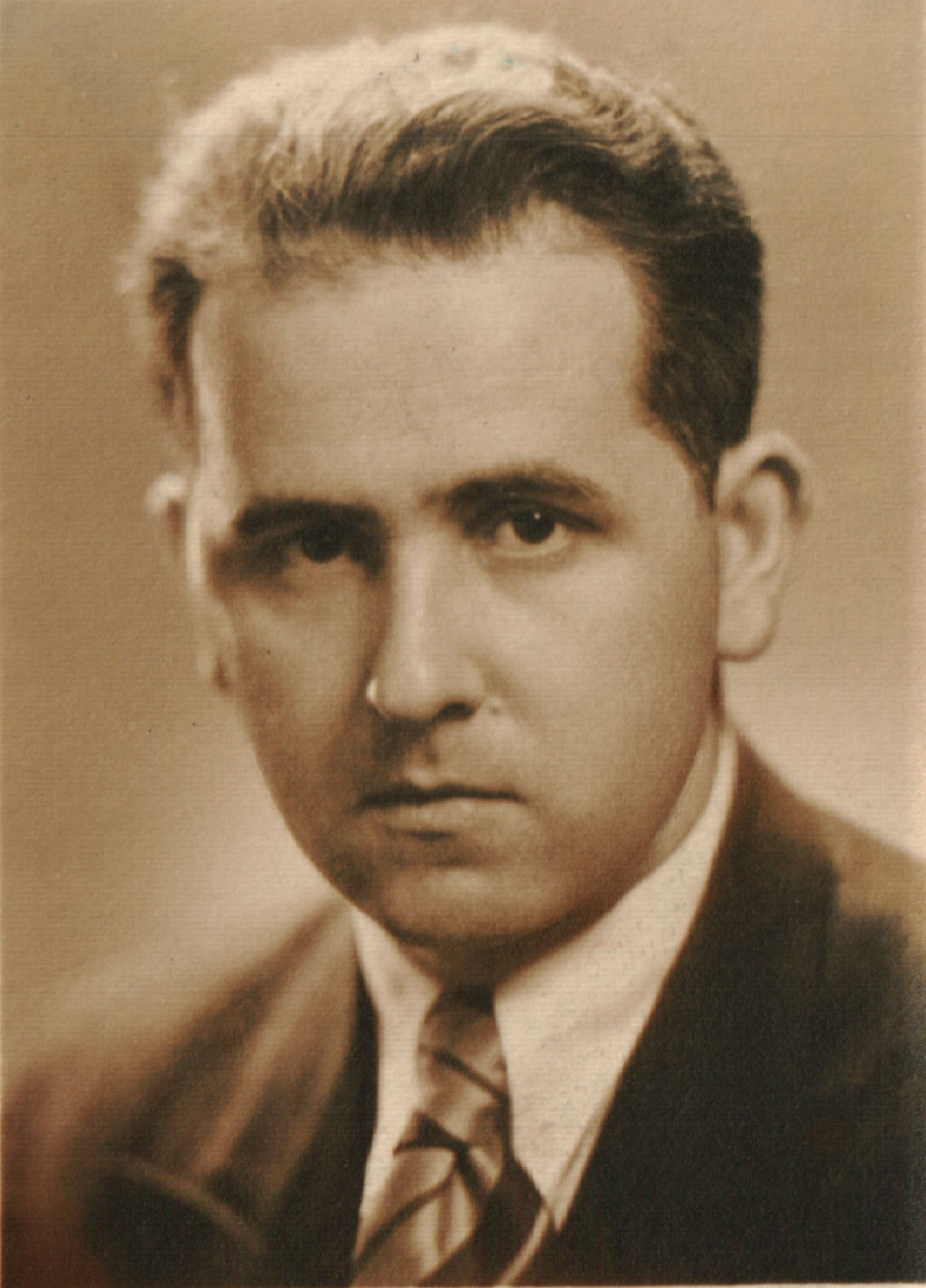
Marin Goleminov, 1940

Marin Petrov Goleminov (Bulgarian: Марин Петров Големинов; 28 September 1908 – 19 February 2000) was a Bulgarian composer, violinist, conductor and pedagogue.

== Life and career ==
Goleminov was born in Kyustendil, Bulgaria; the son of an attorney, he studied law before switching to music. Having studied music at Sofia, Bulgaria, Paris, France, and Munich, Bavaria, Germany, in 1943 he was appointed to the faculty of the Bulgarian State Academy of Music in Sofia to teach orchestration, conducting and composition. From 1954 to 1956 he served as Rector of the Sofia Opera, and as Director of the same organization from 1965 to 1967. In 1976 he was presented with the Gottfried von Herder Award of the Vienna University, and in 1989 was made an Academician of the Bulgarian Academy of Sciences. He died in Espinho, Espinho, Portugal.

Goleminov's compositions draw heavily on the traditional rhythms and melodic patterns of Bulgarian folk music, while also exploring more modernist classical trends. His son Mihail was also a composer.

== Honours ==
Goleminov Point in Antarctica is named after Marin Goleminov.
