= Umber Island =

Island off Alexander Island, Antarctica

- Satellite image of Alexander Island

- Location within Antarctica

Geography
- Location: Lazarev Bay, Alexander Island, Bellingshausen Sea
- Coordinates: 69°13′S 72°0′W
- Length: 2.4 km (1.49 mi)

Location of Alexander Island in the Antarctic Peninsula region

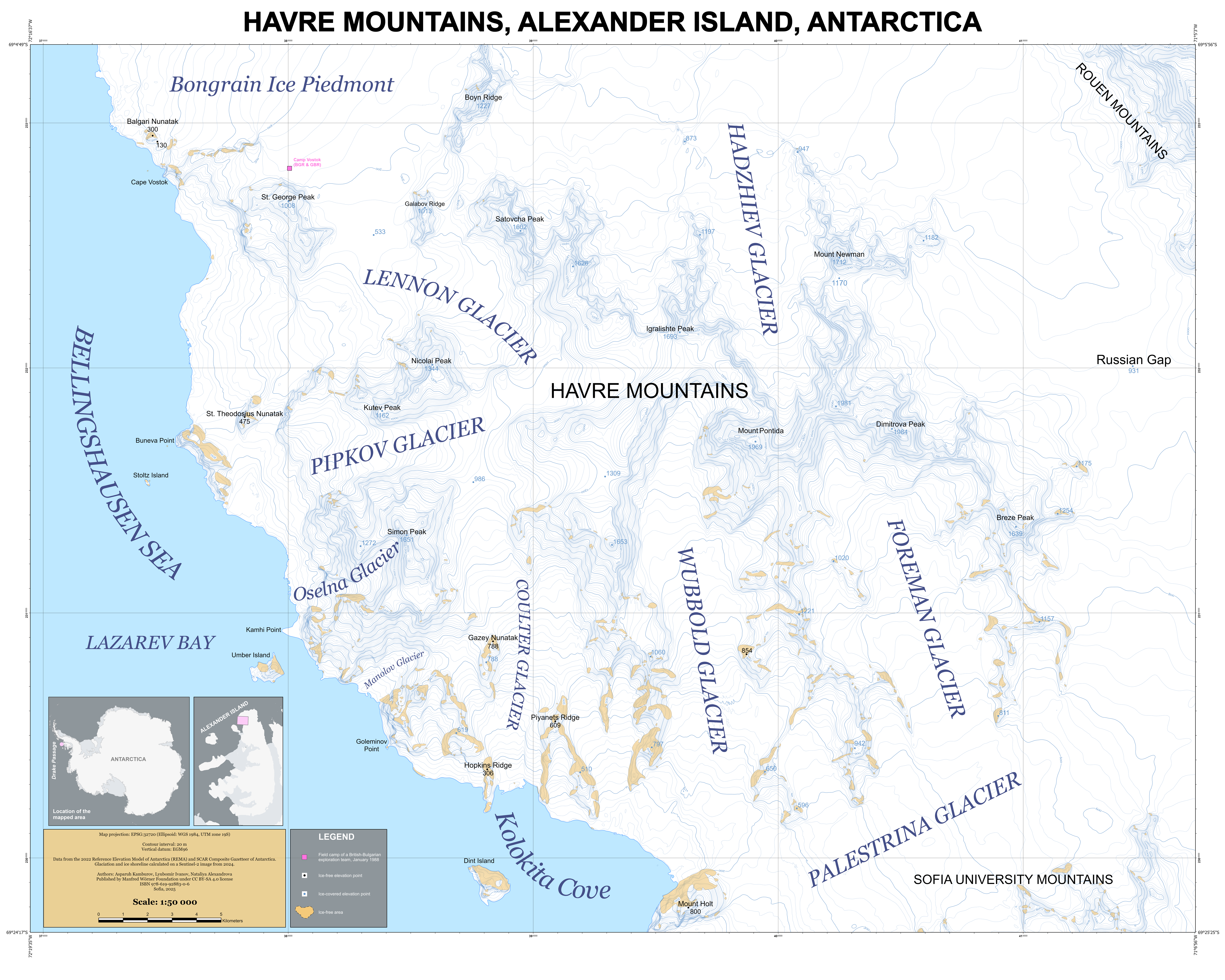
Map of Havre Mountains, Alexander Island in Antarctica

Umber Island (69°13′S 72°0′W) is a rocky island, 2.4 km (1.5 mi) long, lying 1.75 km (1.09 mi) southwest of Kamhi Point and 10 km (6.2 mi) northwest of Dint Island lying within Lazarev Bay, off the west side of Alexander Island, Antarctica. The island was mapped from air photos taken by the Ronne Antarctic Research Expedition (RARE) in 1947–48, by Searle of the Falkland Islands Dependencies Survey in 1960, it was so named by the United Kingdom Antarctic Place-Names Committee because on the RARE photos the island appears in deep shadow cast by the Havre Mountains to the north.

== See also ==
- List of Antarctic and sub-Antarctic islands
- Dorsey Island
- Merger Island
- Stoltz Island
