= Couperin Bay =

Bay in Antarctica

Couperin Bay (72°8′S 74°22′W) is a bay on the south coast of Beethoven Peninsula, Alexander Island, between Perce Point and Berlioz Point. The bay was photographed from the air by the Ronne Antarctic Research Expedition, 1947–48, and was mapped from the photographs by D. Searle of Falkland Islands Dependencies Survey in 1960. It was named by the UK Antarctic Place-Names Committee in 1977 in association with the names of composers grouped in this area, after François Couperin, the French composer. Couperin Bay marks the westernmost bay of Alexander Island.
