= Buneva Point =

Headland on Alexander Island, Antarctica

Location of Alexander Island in the Antarctic Peninsula region

Satellite image of Alexander Island

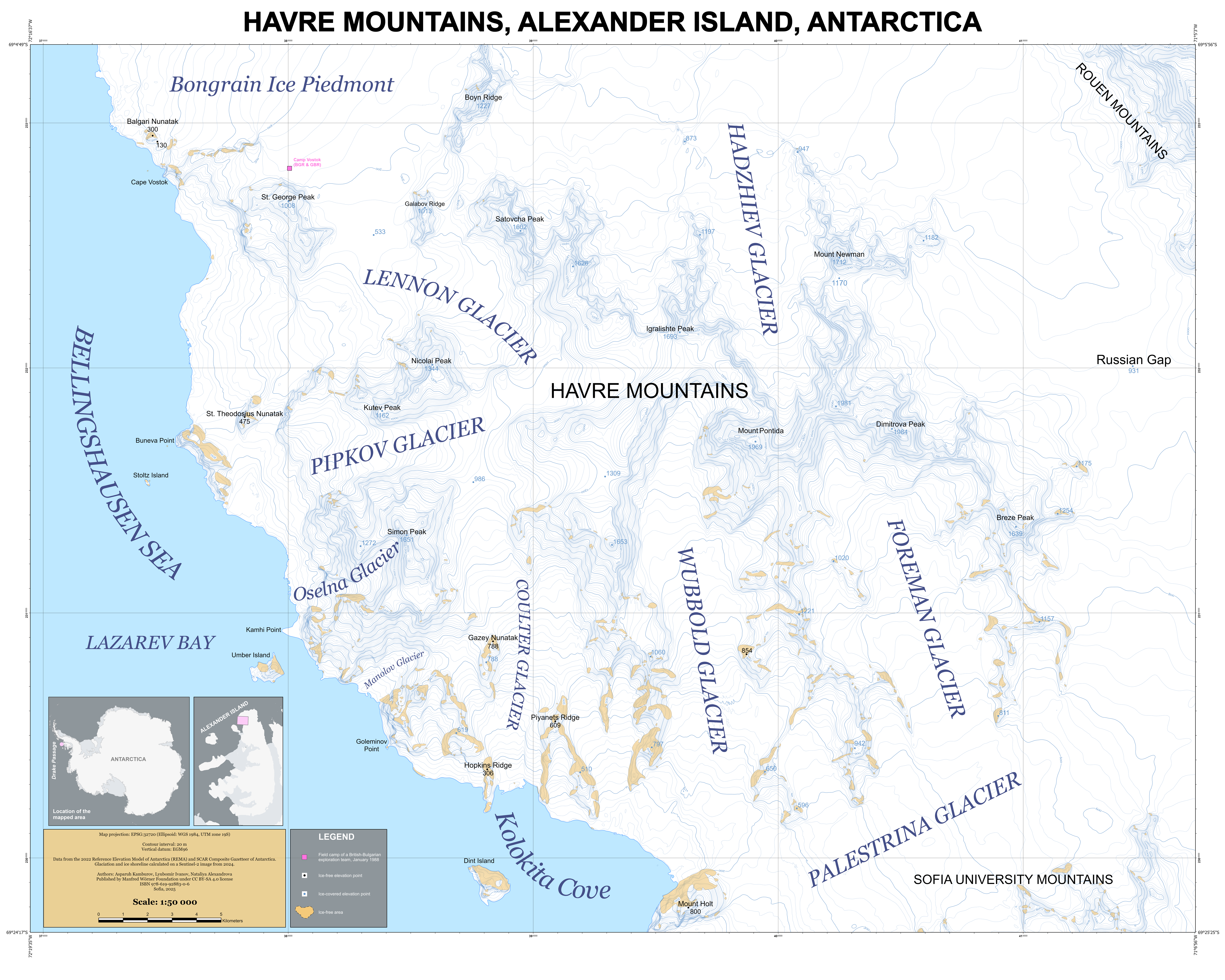
Map of Havre Mountains, Alexander Island in Antarctica

Buneva Point (Bulgarian: нос Бунева, ‘Nos Buneva’ \'nos 'bu-ne-va\) is the sharp rocky point on the northwest coast of Alexander Island in Antarctica projecting 1 km west-southwestwards into Lazarev Bay just south of the terminus of Lennon Glacier. It is formed by the north extremity of the homonymous rocky coastal ridge extending 3.7 km in southeast direction.

The feature is named after Mara Buneva (1902–1928), heroine of the Bulgarian liberation movement in Macedonia.

== Location ==
Buneva Point is located at 69°13′48.7″S 72°09′02″W, which is 11 km south of Cape Vostok, 8.8 km northwest of Kamhi Point and 1.75 km northeast of Stoltz Island. British mapping in 1991.

== Maps ==
- British Antarctic Territory. Scale 1:250000 topographic map. Sheet SR19-20/5. APC UK, 1991
- Antarctic Digital Database (ADD). Scale 1:250000 topographic map of Antarctica. Scientific Committee on Antarctic Research (SCAR). Since 1993, regularly upgraded and updated
