= Merger Island =

Island in Antarctica

- Location of Merger Island

- Location within Antarctic Peninsula Location within Antarctica

Geography
- Location: Antarctica
- Coordinates: 70°6′S 71°13′W
- Length: 5.556 km (3.4523 mi)

Administration
- Administered under the Antarctic Treaty System

Demographics
- Population: Uninhabited

Merger Island is an ice-covered island 6 kilometres (3 nmi) long at the entrance of Haydn Inlet, lying off the west coast of Alexander Island, Antarctica. It was first mapped from air photos taken by the Ronne Antarctic Research Expedition in 1947–48 by D. Searle of the Falkland Islands Dependencies Survey in 1960. The name given by the UK Antarctic Place-Names Committee is descriptive, the island being almost submerged in the surrounding Wilkins Ice Shelf.

== See also ==
- List of Antarctic and sub-Antarctic islands
