= Dint Island =

Island in Antarctica

- Location within Antarctica

Geography
- Location: Antarctica
- Coordinates: 69°17′S 71°49′W
- Length: 3 km (1.9 mi)

Administration
- Administered under the Antarctic Treaty System

Demographics
- Population: Uninhabited

Dint Island is a rocky island, 3 kilometres (1.5 nmi) long. Probably first seen from the air by the United States Antarctic Service, 1939–41, it was first mapped from air photos taken by the Ronne Antarctic Research Expedition, 1947–48, by D. Searle of the Falkland Islands Dependencies Survey in 1960. It was so named by the UK Antarctic Place-Names Committee because a distinctive cirque makes a dent, or dint, on the south side of the island.

== Location ==
Dint Island is located at (69°17′S 71°49′W) and lies 4 kilometres (2 nmi) off the west side of Alexander Island within Lazarev Bay. The island lies roughly 6 miles (10 km) southeast of Umber Island.

== See also ==
- List of Antarctic and sub-Antarctic islands
- Umber Island
- Lazarev Bay
