= Cape Vostok =

Headland on Alexander Island, Antarctica

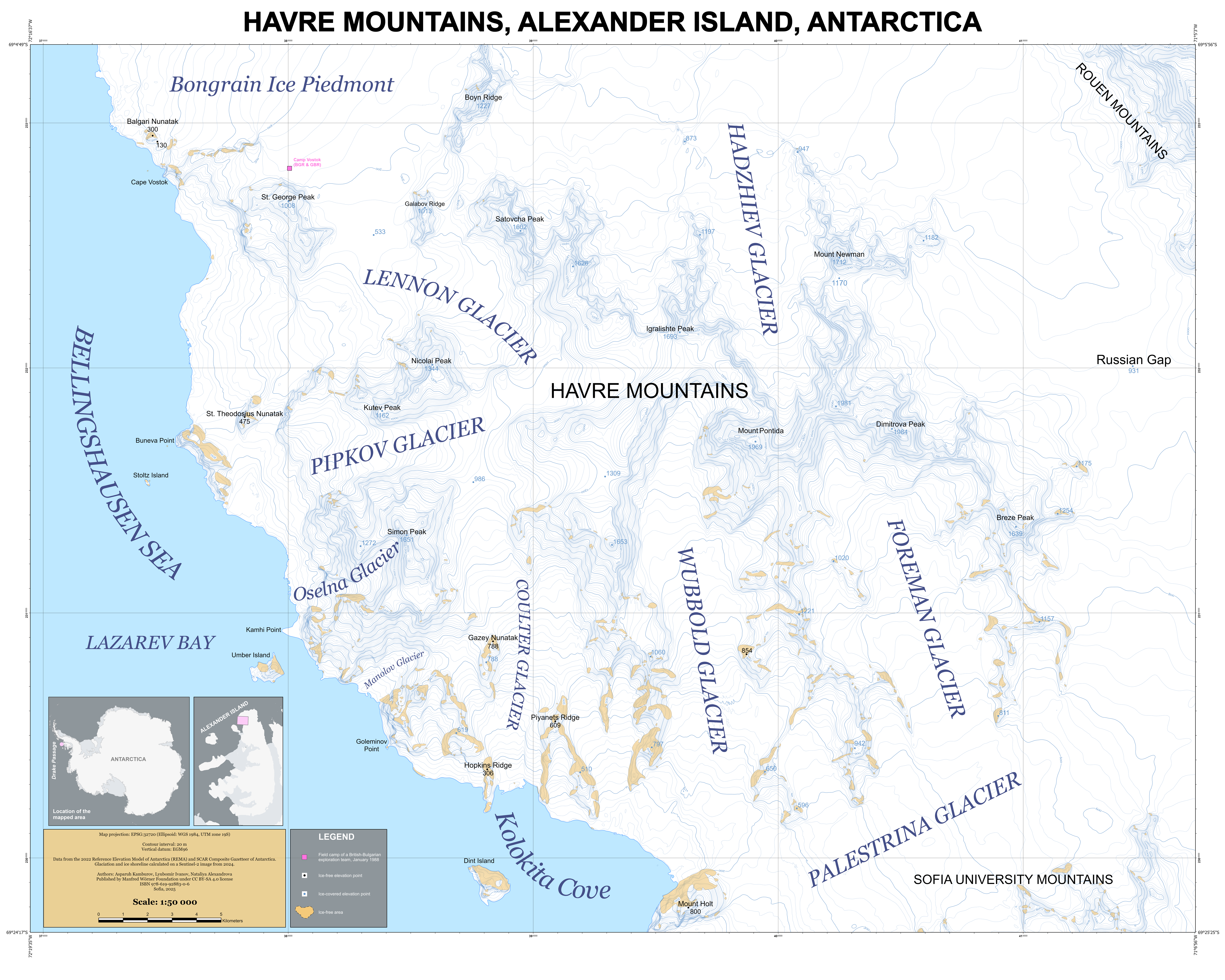
Map of Havre Mountains, Alexander Island in Antarctica

Cape Vostok (69°7′S 72°10′W) is a rocky headland which forms the west extremity of the Havre Mountains and the northwest extremity of Alexander Island in Antarctica. It was discovered by the First Russian Antarctic Expedition in 1821, led by Fabian Gottlieb von Bellingshausen and Mikhail Lazarev. It was mapped in detail from aerial photos taken by the Ronne Antarctic Research Expedition in 1947–48, and later by Searle of the Falkland Islands Dependencies Survey in 1960. Nearby Balgari Nunatak was visited in 1988 by the First Bulgarian Antarctic Expedition and chosen as the site of a future Bulgarian base in Antarctica, which however was eventually set up on Livingston Island instead.

The formation was named by the United Kingdom Antarctic Place-Names Committee for the sloop Vostok, commanded by Bellingshausen. The name means "east", although the cape is located on the western point of the island.

== See also ==
- Cape Brown
- Cape Westbrook
