= Lazarev Bay =

Bay in Antarctica

Coordinates: 69°20′S 72°0′W

Lazarev Bay is a rectangular bay, 15 nautical miles (28 km) long and 13 nautical miles (24 km) wide, which separates Alexander Island from Rothschild Island and is bounded on the south side by the Wilkins Ice Shelf, which joins the east portion of Rothschild Island and the west portion of Alexander Island (partially Cape Vostok, the Havre Mountains and the Lassus Mountains). Two minor islands, Dint Island and Umber Island, lie merged within the ice of the Wilkins Ice Shelf within Lazarev Bay.

The north coast of Alexander Island was first seen from a great distance by the Russian expedition of 1821 under Fabian Gottlieb von Bellingshausen. The bay was first mapped from air photos taken by the Ronne Antarctic Research Expedition, 1947–48, by D. Searle of the Falkland Islands Dependencies Survey in 1960, and it was named by the UK Antarctic Place-Names Committee for Lieutenant Mikhail Petrovich Lazarev, second-in-command of Bellingshausen's expedition and commander of the sloop Mirnyy.

== See also ==
- Couperin Bay
- Schokalsky Bay
